= List of non-profit radio stations in the United States =

This is a list of non-profit radio stations.

== Alabama ==
Birmingham	WBHM	90.3 FM
Dothan	WRWA	88.7 FM
Huntsville	WJAB	90.9 FM
Huntsville	WLRH	89.3 FM
Jacksonville	WLJS-FM	91.9 FM
Mobile	WHIL	91.3 FM
Montgomery	WVAS	90.7 FM
Montgomery/Troy	WTSU	89.9 FM
Muscle Shoals	WQPR	88.7 FM
Selma	WAPR	88.3 FM
Tuscaloosa	WUAL-FM	91.5 FM
Tuscaloosa	WVUA-FM	90.7 FM
== Alaska ==
Anchorage	KSKA	91.1 FM
Anchorage	KNBA	90.3 FM
Bethel	KYUK	640 AM
Chevak	KCUK	88.1 FM
Dillingham	KDLG	670 AM
Fairbanks	KUAC	89.9 FM
Galena	KIYU-FM	88.1 FM
Girdwood	KEUL	88.9 FM
Glennallen	KXGA	90.5 FM
Haines	KHNS	102.3 FM
Homer	KBBI	890 AM
Juneau	KTOO	104.3 FM
Kenai	KDLL	91.9 FM
Ketchikan	KRBD	105.9 FM
Kodiak	KMXT	100.1 FM
McCarthy	KCHU	89.7 FM
Petersburg	KFSK	100.9 FM
Sand Point	KSDP	830 AM
Sitka	KCAW	104.7 FM
St. Paul	KUHB	91.9 FM
Sutton	KVRF	89.5 FM
Talkeetna	KTNA	88.5 FM
Utqiaġvik	KBRW	680 AM
Utqiaġvik	KBRW-FM	91.9 FM
Valdez	KCHU	770 AM
Wrangell	KSTK	101.7 FM
== Arizona ==
Flagstaff	KPUB	91.7 FM
Flagstaff	KNAU	88.7 FM
Drake	KJZA	89.5 FM
Grand Canyon	KNAG	90.3 FM
Hotevilla	KUYI	88.1 FM
Page	KNAD	91.7 FM
Phoenix	KBAQ	89.5 FM
Phoenix	KJZZ	91.5 FM
Prescott	KNAQ	89.3 FM
Sells	KOHN	91.9 FM
Show Low	KNAA	90.7 FM
Tuba City	KGHR	91.5 FM
Tucson	KUAT-FM	90.5 FM
Tucson	KUAZ	1550 AM
Tucson	KUAZ-FM	89.1 FM
Tucson	KXCI-FM	91.3 FM
White River	KNNB	88.1 FM
Yuma	KAWC-FM	88.9 FM
Yuma	KOFA	1320 AM
== Arkansas ==
El Dorado	KBSA	90.9 FM
Fayetteville	KUAF	91.3 FM
Jonesboro	KASU	91.9 FM
Little Rock	KABF	88.3 FM
Little Rock	KLRE-FM	90.5 FM
Little Rock	KUAR	89.1 FM
Rogers	KDUA	96.5 FM
== California ==
Arcata	KHSU	90.5 FM
Bakersfield	KPRX	89.1 FM
Berkeley	KPFA	94.1 FM
Burney	KNCA	89.7 FM
Calexico	KQVO	97.7 FM
Chico	KCHO	91.7 FM
Chico	KZFR	90.1 FM
Crescent City	KHSR	91.9 FM
Fresno	KVPR	89.3 FM
Groveland	KXSR	91.7 FM
Indio	KCRI	89.3 FM
Laguna Beach	KXRN-LP	104.7 FM
Long Beach	KKJZ	88.1 FM
Los Angeles	KUSC	91.5 FM
Mendocino	KPMO	1300 AM
Mount Shasta	KMJC	620 AM
Mount Shasta	KNSQ	88.1 FM
North Highlands	KQEI-FM	89.3 FM
Northridge	KCSN	88.5 FM
Oxnard	KCRU	89.1 FM
Oxnard	KJBU	99.1 FM
Pacific Grove	KAZU	90.3 FM
Palm Springs	KPSC	88.5 FM
Pasadena	KPCC	89.3 FM
Philo	KZYX	90.7 FM
Quincy	KQNC	88.1 FM
Redding	KFPR	88.9 FM
Rio Dell	KNHT	102.5 FM
Rohnert Park	KRCB-FM	104.9 FM
Sacramento	KXJZ	90.9 FM
Sacramento	KXPR	88.9 FM
San Ardo	KBDH	91.7 FM
San Bernardino	KVCR	91.9 FM
San Diego	KPBS-FM	89.5 FM
San Diego	KSDS	88.3 FM
San Francisco	KALW	91.7 FM
San Francisco	KQED-FM	88.5 FM
San Luis Obispo	KCBX	90.1 FM
San Mateo	KCSM	91.1 FM
Santa Barbara	KDRW	88.7 FM
Santa Monica	KCRW	89.9 FM
Santa Rosa	KRCG-FM	91.1 FM
Stockton	KUOP	91.3 FM
Sutter	KXJS	88.7 FM
Tahoe City	KKTO	90.5 FM
Thousand Oaks	KCLU-FM	88.3 FM
Thousand Oaks	KDSC	91.1 FM
Willits	KZYZ	91.5 FM
Yuba City	KRYC	105.9 FM
Yreka	KNYR	91.3 FM
Yreka	KSYC	1490 AM
== Colorado ==
Alamosa	KRZA	88.7 FM
Aspen	KAJX	91.5 FM
Boulder	KCFC	1490 AM
Carbondale	KDNK	88.1 FM
Carbondale	KCJX	88.9 FM
Carbondale	KVOV	90.5 FM
Colorado Springs	KRCC	91.5 FM
Cortez	KSJD	91.5 FM
Craig	KPYR	88.3 FM
Crested Butte	KBUT	90.3 FM
Delta	KPRU	103.3 FM
Denver	KUVO	89.3 FM
Denver	KVOD	90.1 FM
Fort Collins	KVXO	88.3 FM
Grand Junction	KAFM	88.1 FM
Grand Junction	KPRN	89.5 FM
Greeley	KUNC	91.5 FM
Ignacio	KSUT	91.3 FM
Ignacio	KUTE	90.1 FM
La Junta	KECC	89.1 FM
Montrose	KPRH	88.3 FM
Montrose	KVMT	89.1 FM
Paonia	KVNF	90.9 FM
Pueblo	KCFP	91.9 FM
Red Feather Lakes	KRDF	88.7 FM
Steamboat Springs	KRNC	88.5 FM
Telluride	KOTO	91.7 FM
Vail	KPRE	89.9 FM
== Connecticut ==
Bridgeport	WPKN	89.5 FM
Fairfield	WSHU-FM	91.1 FM
Meriden	WNPR	90.5 FM
Middletown	WESU	88.1 FM
Norwich	WPKT	89.1 FM
Stamford	WEDW-FM	88.5 FM
Westport	WSHU	1260 AM
Willimantic	WECS	90.1 FM
== Delaware ==
Dover	WRTX	91.7 FM
== District of Columbia ==
Washington	WAMU	88.5 FM
Washington	WETA	90.9 FM
== Florida ==
Ft. Myers	WGCU-FM	90.1 FM
Ft. Pierce	WQCS	88.9 FM
Gainesville	WUFT-FM	89.1 FM
Inverness	WJUF	90.1 FM
Jacksonville	WJCT-FM	89.9 FM
Melbourne	WFIT	89.5 FM
Miami	WLRN-FM	91.3 FM
Miami	WDNA	88.9 FM
Orlando	WMFE-FM	90.7 FM
Orlando	WUCF-FM	89.9 FM
Panama City	WFSW	89.1 FM
Panama City	WKGC-FM	90.7 FM
Pensacola	WUWF	88.1 FM
Tallahassee	WFSQ	91.5 FM
Tallahassee	WFSU-FM	88.9 FM
Tampa	WMNF	88.5 FM
Tampa	WUSF	89.7 FM
Winter Park	WPRK	91.5 FM
== Georgia ==
Albany	WUNV	91.7 FM
Athens	WUGA	91.7 FM
Atlanta	WABE	90.1 FM
Atlanta	WCLK	91.9 FM
Atlanta	WRFG	89.3 FM
Augusta	WACG-FM	90.7 FM
Brunswick	WWIO-FM	89.1 FM
Carrollton	WUWG	90.7 FM
Columbus	WCUG	88.5 FM
Columbus	WTJB	91.7 FM
Cumming	WWEV-FM	91.5 FM
Dahlonega	WNGU	89.5 FM
Demorest	WPPR	88.3 FM
Fort Gaines	WJWV	90.9 FM
Macon	WMUM-FM	89.7 FM
Rome	WGPB	97.7 FM
Savannah	WSVH	91.1 FM
Thomasville	WFSL	90.7 FM
Tifton	WABR	91.1 FM
Valdosta	WWET	91.7 FM
Warm Springs	WJSP-FM	88.1 FM
Waycross	WXVS	90.1 FM
== Guam ==
Agana	KPRG	89.3 FM
== Hawaii ==
Hilo	KANO	89.1 FM
Honolulu	KHPR	88.1 FM
Honolulu	KIPO	89.3 FM
Wailuku	KKUA	90.7 FM
Wailuku	KMNO	91.7 FM
== Idaho ==
Boise	KBSU	90.3 FM
Boise	KBSX	91.5 FM
Bonners Ferry	KIBX	92.1 FM
Burley	KBSY	88.5 FM
Cottonwood	KNWO	90.1 FM
McCall	KBSK	89.9 FM
McCall	KBSM	91.7 FM
McCall	KBSQ	90.7 FM
Moscow	KRFA-FM	91.7 FM
Pocatello	KISU-FM	91.1 FM
Rexburg	KBYI	100.5 FM
Sun Valley	KWRV	91.9 FM
Twin Falls	KEZJ	1450 FM
Twin Falls	KBSW	91.7 FM
== Illinois ==
Carbondale	WSIU	91.9 FM
Champaign	WEFT	90.1 FM
Chicago	WBEZ	91.5 FM
Chicago	WCXP-LP	107.1 FM
DeKalb	WNIU	90.5 FM
Edwardsville	WSIE	88.7 FM
Freeport	WNIE	89.1 FM
LaSalle	WNIW	91.5 FM
Macomb	WIUM	91.3 FM
Morris	WBEQ	90.7 FM
Mt. Vernon	WVSI	88.9 FM
Mt. Carmel	WVJC	89.1 FM
Normal	WGLT	89.1 FM
Olney	WUSI	90.3 FM
Pekin	WBNH	88.5 FM
Pekin	WCIC	91.5 FM
Peoria	WAZU	90.7 FM
Peoria	WCBU	89.9 FM
Pittsfield	WIPA	89.3 FM
Quincy	WQUB	90.3 FM
Rock Island	WVIK	90.3 FM
Rockford	WNIJ	89.5 FM
Springfield	WUIS	91.9 FM
Sterling	WNIQ	91.5 FM
Urbana	WILL	580 AM
Urbana	WILL-FM	90.9 AM
Warsaw	WIUW	89.5 FM
== Indiana ==
Anderson	WBSB	89.5 FM
Bloomington	WFIU	103.7 FM
Chestertown	WBEW	89.5 FM
Crawfordsville	WNDY	91.3 FM
Elkhart	WVPE	88.1 FM
Evansville	WNIN-FM	88.3 FM
Fort Wayne	WBOI	89.1 FM
Fort Wayne	WCYT	91.1 FM
Hagerstown	WBSH	91.1 FM
Indianapolis	WFYI-FM	90.1 FM
Lafayette	WBAA	920 AM
Lafayette	WBAA-FM	101.3 FM
Marion	WBSW	90.9 FM
Merrillville, Indiana	WLPR-FM	89.1 FM
Muncie	WBST	92.1 FM
Portland	WZJR	91.7 FM
Vincennes	WVUB	91.1 FM
== Iowa ==
Ames	WOI	640 AM
Ames	WOI-FM	90.1 FM
Carroll	KNSC	90.7 FM
Cedar Falls	KUNI	90.9 FM
Cedar Rapids	KCCK-FM	88.3 FM
Decorah	KLCD	89.5 FM
Decorah	KLNI	88.7 FM
Dubuque	KDUB-FM	89.7 FM
Fort Dodge	KNSK	91.1 FM
Iowa City	WSUI	910 AM
Iowa City	KSUI	91.7 FM
Lamoni	KNSL	97.9 FM
Mason City	KRNI	1010 AM
Mason City	KNSM	91.5 FM
Mitchellville	KKSO	88.9 FM
Okoboji	KOJI	90.7 FM
Sioux City	KWIT	90.3 FM
== Kansas ==
Emporia	KANH	89.7 FM
Garden City	KANZ	91.1 FM
Great Bend	KHCT	90.9 FM
Hays	KZAN	91.7 FM
Hill City	KZNA	90.5 FM
Lawrence	KANU	91.5 FM
Olsburg	KANV	91.3 FM
Pittsburg	KRPS	89.9 FM
Wichita	KMUW	89.1 FM

== Kentucky ==
Booneville	WEBF	88.3 FM
Bowling Green	WKYU-FM	88.9 FM
Corbin	WEKC	88.5 FM
Elizabethtown	WKUE	90.9 FM
Hazard	WEKH	90.9 FM
Hardin	WAAJ	90.5 FM
Henderson	WKPB	89.5 FM
Lexington	WUKY	91.3 FM
Louisville	WNAS	88.1 FM
Louisville	WFPL	89.3 FM
Louisville	WUOL	90.5 FM
Louisville	WFPK	91.9 FM
Morehead	WMKY	90.3 FM
Murray	WKMS-FM	91.3 FM
Richmond	WEKU	88.9 FM
Somerset	WDCL	89.7 FM
== Louisiana ==
Alexandria	KLSA	90.7 FM
Baton Rouge	WBRH	90.3 FM
Baton Rouge	WRKF	89.3 FM
Lafayette	KRVS	88.7 FM
Monroe	KEDM	90.3 FM
New Orleans	WWNO	89.9 FM
Shreveport	KDAQ	89.9 FM
Thibodaux	KTLN	90.5 FM
== Maine ==
Bangor	WMEH	90.9 FM
Blue Hill	WERU	89.9 FM
Calais	WMED	89.7 FM
Camden	WMEP	90.5 FM
Fort Kent	WMEF	106.5 FM
Lewiston	WMEA	90.1 FM
Portland	WMPG	90.9 FM
Presque Isle	WMEM	106.1 FM
Waterville	WMEW	91.3 FM
== Marianas|Marianas Pacific ==
Saipan	KRNM	88.1 FM
== Maryland ==
Baltimore	WEAA	88.9 FM
Baltimore	WYPR	88.1 FM
Baltimore	WBJC	91.5 FM
Frostburg	WFWM	91.9 FM
Hagerstown	WGMS	89.1 FM
Ocean City	WSDL	90.7 FM
Princess Anne	WESM	91.3 FM
Salisbury	WSCL	89.5 FM
Towson	WTMD	89.7 FM
Worton	WKHS	90.5 FM
== Massachusetts ==
Amherst	WFCR	88.5 FM
Boston	WBUR-FM	90.9 FM
Boston	WGBH	89.7 FM
Boston	WUMB-FM	91.9 FM
Falmouth	WFPB-FM	91.9 FM
Great Barrington	WAMQ	105.1 FM
Harwich	WCCT-FM	90.3 FM
Nantucket	WNAN	91.1 FM
Newburyport	WNEF	91.7 FM
Orléans	WFPB	1170 AM
Sandwich	WSDH	91.5 FM
Tisbury	WMVY	88.7 FM
Woods Hole	WCAI	90.1 FM
Worcester	WBPR	91.9 FM
Worcester	WCUW	91.3 FM
Worcester	WICN	90.5 FM
== Michigan ==
Allendale	WGVU-FM	88.5 FM
Alpena	WCML-FM	91.7 FM
Ann Arbor	WUOM	91.7 FM
Bay City	WUCX-FM	90.1 FM
Detroit	WDET-FM	101.9 FM
East Lansing	WKAR	870 AM
East Lansing	WKAR-FM	90.5 FM
Flint	WFUM	91.1 FM
Grand Rapids	WCSG-FM	91.3 FM
Grand Rapids	WBLU-FM	88.9 FM
Grand Rapids	WVGR	104.1 FM
Grand Rapids	WYCE	88.1 FM
Harbor Springs	WCMW-FM	103.9 FM
Houghton	WGGL-FM	91.1 FM
Interlochen	WIAA	88.7 FM
Kalamazoo	WMUK	102.1 FM
Lansing	WLNZ	89.7 FM
Mackinaw City	WIAB	88.5 FM
Marquette	WNMU-FM	90.1 FM
Mt. Pleasant	WCMU-FM	89.5 FM
Oscoda	WCMB-FM	95.7 FM
Sault Ste. Marie	WCMZ	98.3 FM
Standish	WWCM	96.9 FM
Traverse City	WICA	91.5 FM
Twin Lake	WBLV	90.3 FM
Whitehall	WGVS-FM	95.3 FM
Ypsilanti	WEMU	89.1 FM
== Minnesota ==
Appleton	KNCM	91.3 FM
Appleton	KRSU	88.5 FM
Bemidji	KCRB-FM	88.5 FM
Bemidji	KNBJ	91.3 FM
Brainerd	KBPN	88.3 FM
Brainerd	KBPR	90.7 FM
Collegeville–St. Cloud	KNSR	88.9 FM
Collegeville–St. Cloud	KSJR-FM	90.1 FM
Duluth	WSCD-FM	92.9 FM
Duluth	WSCN	100.5 FM
Fergus Falls	KCMF	89.7 FM
Fergus Falls	KNWF	91.5 FM
Grand Marais	WMLS	88.7 FM
Grand Marais	WLSN	89.7 FM
Grand Rapids	KAXE	91.7 FM
La Crescent	KXLC	91.1 FM
Moorhead	KCCD	90.3 FM
Moorhead	KCCM-FM	91.1 FM
Rochester	KLSE	90.7 FM
Rochester	KMSE	88.7 FM
Rochester	KZSE	91.7 FM
St. Paul–Minneapolis	KNOW-FM	91.1 FM
St. Paul–Minneapolis	KSJN	99.5 FM
St. Paul–Minneapolis	KCMP	89.3 FM
St. Paul–Minneapolis	KFAI	90.3 FM
St. Peter–Mankato	KGAC	91.5 FM
St. Peter–Mankato	KNGA	90.5 FM
Thief River Falls	KQMN	91.5 FM
Thief River Falls	KNTN	102.7 FM
Virginia–Hibbing	WIRR	90.9 FM
Virginia–Hibbing	WIRN	92.5 FM
Worthington–Marshall	KNSW	91.7 FM
Worthington–Marshall	KRSW-FM	89.3 FM
== Mississippi ==
Biloxi	WMAH-FM	90.3 FM
Booneville	WMAE-FM	89.5 FM
Bude	WMAU-FM	88.9 FM
Greenwood	WMAO-FM	90.9 FM
Holly Springs	WURC	88.1 FM
Jackson	WJSU-FM	88.5 FM
Jackson	WMPN-FM	91.3 FM
Lorman	WPRL	91.7 FM
Meridian	WMAW-FM	88.1 FM
Mississippi State	WMAB-FM	89.9 FM
Oxford	WMAV-FM	90.3 FM
== Missouri ==
Branson	KSMS-FM	90.5 FM
Cape Girardeau	KRCU	90.9 FM
Chillicothe	KRNW	88.9 FM
Columbia	KBIA	91.3 FM
Columbia	KOPN	89.5 FM
Farmington	KSEF	88.9 FM
Kansas City	KCUR-FM	89.3 FM
Maryville	KXCV	90.5 FM
Rolla	KMST	88.5 FM
Springfield	KSMU	91.1 FM
St. Charles	KCLC	89.1 FM
St. Louis	KWMU	90.7 FM
St. Louis	KDHX	88.1 FM
Warrensburg	KTBG	90.9 FM
West Plains	KSMW	90.9 FM
Kansas City	KKFI-FM	90.1 FM
== Montana ==
Billings	KEMC	91.7 FM
Bozeman	KBMC-FM	102.1 FM
Butte	KAPC-FM	91.3 FM
Fort Belknap	KGVA	88.1 FM
Great Falls	KGPR-FM	89.9 FM
Hamilton	KUFN-FM	91.9 FM
Helena	KUHM-FM	91.7 FM
Helena	KYPH	88.5 FM
Helena Valley SE	KYPX	106.5 FM
Kalispell	KUKL-FM	89.9 FM
Missoula	KUFM	89.1 FM
== Nebraska ==
Alliance	KTNE-FM	91.1 FM
Bassett	KMNE-FM	90.3 FM
Chadron	KCNE-FM	91.9 FM
Hastings	KHNE-FM	89.1 FM
Lexington	KLNE-FM	88.7 FM
Lincoln	KUCV	91.1 FM
Lincoln	KZUM	89.3 FM
Merriman	KRNE-FM	91.5 FM
Norfolk	KXNE-FM	89.3 FM
North Platte	KPNE-FM	91.7 FM
Omaha	KIOS-FM	91.5 FM
== Nevada ==
Elko	KNCC	91.5 FM
Goldfield	KGFN	89.1 FM
Jackpot	KBSJ	91.3 FM
Las Vegas	KCNV	89.7 FM
Las Vegas	KNPR	88.9 FM
Las Vegas	KUNV	91.5 FM
Las Vegas	KCEP	88.1 FM
Lund	KWPR	88.7 FM
Panaca	KLNR	91.7 FM
Reno	KUNR	88.7 FM
Tonopah	KTPH-FM	91.7 FM
== New Hampshire ==
Concord	WEVO	89.1 FM
Gorham	WEVC	107.1 FM
Hanover	WEVH	91.3 FM
Jackson	WEVJ	99.5 FM
Keene	WEVN	90.7 FM
Nashua	WEVS	88.3 FM
== New Jersey ==
Atlantic City	WNJN-FM	89.7 FM
Berlin	WTHA	88.1 FM
Cape May	WNJZ	90.3 FM
Hackettstown	WXPJ	91.9 FM
Lincroft	WBJB-FM	90.5 FM
Manahawkin	WNJM	89.9 FM
Newark	WBGO	88.3 FM
Newark	WQXR-FM	105.9 FM
Ocean City/Atlantic City	WRTQ	91.3 FM
Sussex	WNJP	88.5 FM
Trenton	WNJT-FM	88.1 FM
== New Mexico ==
Alamo	KOAZ	1500 AM
Alamogordo	KALH	95.1 FM
Albuquerque	KANW	89.1 FM
Albuquerque	KUNM	89.9 FM
Dulce	KCIE-FM	90.5 FM
Gallup	KGLP	91.7 FM
Las Cruces	KRWG	90.7 FM
Maljamar	KMTH-FM	98.7 FM
Portales	KENW-FM	89.5 FM
Ramah	KTDB	89.7 FM
Santa Rosa	KANR	91.9 FM
== New York ==
Loudonville	WVCR	88.3 FM
Albany	WAMC	1400 AM
Albany	WAMC-FM	90.3 FM
Binghamton	WSKG-FM	89.3 FM
Binghamton	WSQX-FM	91.5 FM
Blue Mtn. Lake	WXLH	91.3 FM
Brooklyn	WNYE	91.5 FM
Brookville	WCWP	88.1 FM
Buffalo	WBFO	88.7 FM
Buffalo	WDCZ	970 AM
Buffalo	WNED-FM	94.5 FM
Canajoharie	WCAN	93.3 FM
Canton	WSLU	89.5 FM
Corning	WSQE	91.1 FM
Fredonia	WCVF-FM	91.3 FM
Geneva	WEOS	89.5 FM
Hamilton	WRCU-FM	90.1 FM
Hornell	WSQA	88.7 FM
Houghton	WXXY	90.3 FM
Ithaca	WSQG-FM	90.9 FM
Jamestown	WUBJ	88.1 FM
Jamestown	WNJA	89.7 FM
Jeffersonville	WJFF	90.5 FM
Kingston	WAMK	90.9 FM
Malone	WSLO	90.9 FM
Middletown	WOSR	91.7 FM
New York City	WBAI	99.5 FM
New York City	WKCR	89.9 FM
New York City	WFUV	90.7 FM
New York City	WNYC	820 AM
New York City	WNYC-FM	93.9 FM
North Creek	WXLG	89.9 FM
Olean	WOLN	91.3 FM
Oneonta	WSQC-FM	91.7 FM
Oswego	WRVO	89.9 FM
Oswego	WRVD	90.3 FM
Peru	WXLU	88.1 FM
Plattsburgh	WCEL	91.9 FM
Poughkeepsie	WRHV	88.7 FM
Rochester	WXXI	1370 AM
Rochester	WXXI-FM	105.9 FM
Rochester	WXXO	91.5 FM
Rochester	WRUR-FM	88.5 FM
Saranac Lake	WSLL	90.5 FM
Schenectady	WMHT-FM	89.1 FM
Selden	WSUF	89.9 FM
Southampton	WLIW-FM	88.3 FM
Southampton	WRLI-FM	91.3 FM
Syracuse	WAER	88.3 FM
Syracuse	WCNY-FM	91.3 FM
Ticonderoga	WANC	103.9 FM
Utica	WRVN	91.9 FM
Utica	WUNY	89.5 FM
Watertown	WJNY	90.9 FM
Watertown	WRVJ	91.7 FM
Watertown	WSLJ	88.9 FM
== North Carolina ==
Asheville	WCQS	88.1 FM
Atlantic Beach	WBJD	91.5 FM
Buxton	WBUX	90.5 FM
Chapel Hill	WUNC	91.5 FM
Charlotte	WFAE	90.7 FM
Davidson	WDAV	89.9 FM
Durham	WNCU	90.7 FM
Elizabeth City	WRVS-FM	89.9 FM
Fayetteville	WFSS	91.9 FM
Franklin	WFQS	91.3 FM
Garysburg	WZRU	90.1 FM
Hickory	WFHE	90.3 FM
Kinston	WKNS	90.3 FM
Manteo	WUND-FM	88.9 FM
Manteo	WURI	91.5 FM
New Bern	WTEB	89.3 FM
New Bern	WZNB	88.5 FM
Norlina	WZRN	90.5 FM
Raleigh	WCPE	89.7 FM
Raleigh	WRLY	93.5 FM
Raleigh	WKRP	101.9 FM
Rocky Mount	WRQM	90.9 FM
Spindale	WNCW	88.7 FM
Wilmington	WHQR	91.3 FM
Winston-Salem	WFDD	88.5 FM
Winston-Salem	WSNC	90.5 FM

== North Dakota ==
Belcourt	KEYA	88.5 FM
Bismarck	KCND	90.5 FM
Dickinson	KDPR	89.9 FM
Fargo	KDSU	91.9 FM
Grand Forks	KUND-FM	89.3 FM
Grand Forks	KFJM	90.7 FM
Jamestown	KPRJ	91.5 FM
Minot	KMPR	88.9 FM
Williston	KPPR	89.5 FM
== Ohio ==
Akron	WAPS	91.3 FM
Akron	WCRF	88.1 FM
Athens	WOUB	1340 AM
Athens	WOUB-FM	91.3 FM
Bryan	WGBE	90.9 FM
Cambridge	WOUC-FM	89.1 FM
Chillicothe	WOUH-FM	91.9 FM
Cincinnati	WAIF	88.3 FM
Cincinnati	WGUC	90.9 FM
Cincinnati	WVXU	91.7 FM
Cleveland	WCLV	90.3 FM
Cleveland	WRUW	91.1 FM
Columbus	WCBE	90.5 FM
Columbus	WVSG	820 AM
Columbus	WOSU-FM	89.7 FM
Coshocton	WOSE	91.1 FM
Dayton	WDPR	88.1 FM
Defiance	WGDE	91.9 FM
Ironton	WOUL-FM	89.1 FM
Kent	WKSU	89.7 FM
Lima	WGLE	90.7 FM
Mansfield	WOSV	91.7 FM
Marion	WOSB	91.1 FM
Norwalk	WNRK	90.7 FM
New Philadelphia	WKRJ	91.5 FM
Oxford	WMUB	88.5 FM
Portsmouth	WOSP	91.5 FM
Reading	WMKV	89.3 FM
Thompson	WKSV	89.1 FM
Toledo	WGTE-FM	91.3 FM
Wilberforce	WCSU-FM	88.9 FM
Wooster	WKRW	89.3 FM
Yellow Springs	WYSO	91.3 FM
Youngstown	WYSU	88.5 FM
Zanesville	WOUZ-FM	90.1 FM
== Oklahoma ==
Altus	KOCU	90.1 FM
Ardmore	KLCU	90.3 FM
Clinton	KQOU	89.1 FM
Ketchum	KOSN	107.5 FM
Lawton	KCCU	89.3 FM
Norman	KGOU	106.3 FM
Oklahoma City	KROU	105.7 FM
Stillwater	KOSU	91.7 FM
Tulsa	KWGS	89.5 FM
Tulsa	KWTU	88.7 FM
== Oregon ==
Ashland	KAGI	930 AM
Ashland	KSJK	1230 AM
Ashland	KSMF	89.1 FM
Ashland	KSRG	88.3 FM
Ashland	KSOR	90.1 FM
Astoria	KMUN	91.9 FM
Bend	KOAB-FM	91.3 FM
Coos Bay	KSBA	88.5 FM
Corvallis	KOAC	550 AM
Eugene	KLCC	89.7 FM
Eugene	KOPB	1600 AM
Eugene	KRVM	1280 AM
Florence	KLFO	88.1 FM
Gresham	KMHD	89.1 FM
Klamath Falls	KLMF	88.5 FM
Klamath Falls	KSKF	90.9 FM
Myrtle Point	KOOZ	94.1 FM
Newport	KLCO	90.5 FM
Pendleton	KRBM	90.9 FM
Portland	KOPB-FM	91.5 FM
Portland	KBOO	90.7 FM
Portland	KQAC	89.9 FM
Reedsport	KLFR	89.1 FM
Roseburg	KSRS	91.5 FM
Roseburg	KTBR	950 AM
Roseburg	KMPQ	88.1 FM
Tillamook	KTCB	89.5 FM
Warrenton	KCPB-FM	90.9 FM
== Pennsylvania ==
Allentown	WDIY	88.1 FM
Allentown	WMUH	91.7 FM
Bethlehem	WLVR	91.3 FM
Erie	WQLN-FM	91.3 FM
Harrisburg	WITF-FM	89.5 FM
Harrisburg	WXPH	88.1 FM
Jersey Shore	WXPI	88.5 FM
Johnstown	WQEJ	89.7 FM
Kane	WPSX	90.1 FM
Meadville	WARC	90.3 FM
Mt. Pocono	WRTY	91.1 FM
Philadelphia	WHYY-FM	90.9 FM
Philadelphia	WRTI	90.1 FM
Philadelphia	WXPN	88.5 FM
Pittsburgh	WESA	90.5 FM
Pittsburgh	WQED-FM	89.3 FM
Pittsburgh	WYEP-FM	91.3 FM
Schnecksville	WLHI	90.3 FM
Scranton	WVIA-FM	89.9 FM
State College	WPSU	91.5 FM
Summerdale	WJAZ	91.7 FM
Williamsport	WVYA	89.7 FM
== Puerto Rico ==
Río Piedras	WRTU	89.7 FM
== Rhode Island ==
Narragansett Pier	WNPE	102.7 FM
Providence	WPVD	1290 AM
== South Carolina ==
Aiken	WLJK	89.1 FM
Beaufort	WJWJ-FM	89.9 FM
Charleston	WSCI	89.3 FM
Columbia	WLTR	91.3 FM
Conway	WHMC-FM	90.1 FM
Greenville	WEPR	90.1 FM
Rock Hill	WNSC-FM	88.9 FM
Sumter	WRJA-FM	88.1 FM
Orangeburg	WOCS-FM	93.7FM
== South Dakota ==
Brookings	KESD	88.3 FM
Faith	KPSD-FM	97.1 FM
Lowry	KQSD-FM	91.9 FM
Martin	KZSD-FM	102.5 FM
Pierpont–Watertown	KDSD-FM	90.9 FM
Rapid City	KBHE-FM	89.3 FM
Reliance–Pierre	KTSD-FM	91.1 FM
Sioux Falls	KCSD	90.9 FM
Sioux Falls	KRSD	88.1 FM
Vermillion	KUSD	89.7 FM
== Tennessee ==
Chattanooga	WUTC	88.1 FM
Collegedale	WSMC-FM	90.5 FM
Cookeville	WHRS	91.7 FM
Dyersburg	WKNQ	90.7 FM
Jackson	WKNP	90.1 FM
Johnson City	WETS-FM	89.5 FM
Knoxville	WUOT	91.9 FM
Memphis	WKNO-FM	91.1 FM
Murfreesboro	WMOT	89.5 FM
Nashville	WNXP	91.1 FM
Nashville	WPLN-FM	90.3 FM
Tullahoma	WTML	91.5 FM
== Texas ==
Abilene	KACU	89.5 FM
Amarillo	KJJP	105.7 FM
Austin	KUT	90.5 FM
Beaumont	KVLU	91.3 FM
Bushland	KTXP	91.5 FM
College Station	KAMU-FM	90.9 FM
College Station	KEOS	89.1 FM
Commerce	KETR	88.9 FM
Corpus Christi	KEDT-FM	90.3 FM
Corpus Christi	KLUX	89.5 FM
Dallas-Fort Worth	KERA	90.1 FM
Dallas-Fort Worth	KKXT	91.7 FM
Dallas-Fort Worth	KNON	89.3 FM
Denton	KNTU	88.1 FM
El Paso	KTEP	88.5 FM
Harlingen	KJJF	88.9 FM
Houston	KUHF	88.7 FM
Houston	KTSU	90.9 FM
Ingram	KTXI	90.1 FM
Lubbock	KTTZ-FM	89.1 FM
Lufkin	KLDN	88.9 FM
Marfa	KRTS	93.5 FM
McAllen	KHID	88.1 FM
Odessa	KXWT	91.3 FM
Prairie View	KPVU	91.3 FM
San Angelo	KUTX-FM	90.1 FM
San Antonio	KSTX	89.1 FM
San Antonio	KPAC	88.3 FM
Spearman	KTOT	89.5 FM
Texarkana	KTXK	91.5 FM
Victoria	KVRT	90.7 FM
Waco	KWBU-FM	103.3 FM
Wichita Falls	KMCU	88.7 FM
== Utah ==
Logan	KUSU-FM	91.5 FM
Logan	KUSR	89.5 FM
Provo	KBYU-FM	89.1 FM
Salt Lake City	KUUB	88.3 FM
Salt Lake City	KPCW	91.7 FM
Salt Lake City	KUER-FM	90.1 FM
Tooele	KIHU	1010 AM
== US Virgin Islands ==
Saint Thomas	WVIE	107.3 FM
== Vermont ==
Bennington	WBTN-FM	94.3 FM
Burlington	WVPS	107.9 FM
Colchester	WVTX	88.7 FM
Norwich	WNCH	88.1 FM
Rutland	WRVT	88.7 FM
St. Johnsbury	WVPA	88.5 FM
Windsor	WVPR	89.5 FM
== Virginia ==
Charlottesville	WVTU	89.3 FM
Charlottesville	WVTW	88.5 FM
Charlottesville	WMRY	103.5 FM
Charlottesville	WXRK-LP	92.3 FM
Charlottesville	WREN-LP	97.9 FM
Charlottesville	WVAI-LP	101.3 FM
Chase City	WMVE	90.1 FM
Christiansburg	WWVT	1260 AM
Farmville	WMLU	91.3 FM
Ferrum	WWVT-FM	89.9 FM
Hampton	WHOV	88.1 FM
Harrisonburg	WMRA	90.7 FM
Heathsville	WCNV	89.1 FM
Hot Springs	WCHG	107.1 FM
Lexington	WMRL	89.9 FM
Marion	WVTR	91.9 FM
Monterey	WVLS	89.7 FM
Norfolk	WHRO-FM	90.3 FM
Norfolk	WHRV	89.5 FM
Norfolk	WNSB	91.1 FM
Richmond	WCVE-FM	88.9 FM
Roanoke	WVTF	89.1 FM
Wise	WISE-FM	90.5 FM
== Washington ==
Bellingham	KZAZ	91.7 FM
Clarkston	KNWV	90.5 FM
Ellensburg	KNWR	90.7 FM
Moses Lake	KLWS	91.5 FM
Lacey	KBRD	680 AM
Mount Vernon	KMWS	90.1 FM
Omak	KQWS	90.1 FM
Port Angeles	KNWP	90.1 FM
Pullman	KWSU	1250 AM
Republic	KETL-LP	100.5 FM
Richland	KFAE-FM	89.1 FM
Seattle	KEXP-FM	90.3 FM
Seattle	KUOW-FM	94.9 FM
Spokane	KYRS	88.1/92.3 FM
Spokane	KPBX-FM	91.1 FM
Spokane	KSFC	91.9 FM
Seattle/Tacoma	KNKX	88.5 FM
Tumwater	KUOW	1340 AM
Walla Walla	KWWS	89.7 FM
Yakima	KNWY	90.3 FM
== West Virginia ==
Beckley	WVBY	91.7 FM
Buckhannon	WVPW	88.9 FM
Charleston	WVPB	88.5 FM
Frost	WVMR	1370 AM
Huntington	WVWV	89.9 FM
Martinsburg	WVEP	88.9 FM
Morgantown	WVPM	90.9 FM
Parkersburg	WVPG	90.3 FM
Petersburg	WVDS	89.5 FM
Wheeling	WVNP	89.9 FM
== Wisconsin ==
Appleton	WOVM	91.1 FM
Auburndale	WLBL	930 AM
Brule	WHSA	89.9 FM
Delafield	WHAD	90.7 FM
Eau Claire	WUEC	89.7 FM
Green Bay	WHID	88.1 FM
Green Bay	WPNE	89.3 FM
Hayward	WOJB	88.9 FM
Highland	WHHI	91.3 FM
Kenosha	WGTD	91.1 FM
La Crosse	WHLA	90.3 FM
La Crosse	WLSU	88.9 FM
Madison	WERN	88.7 FM
Madison	WHA	970 AM
Menomonie	WHWC	88.3 FM
Menomonie	WVSS	90.7 FM
Milwaukee	WUWM	89.7 FM
Milwaukee	WYMS	88.9 FM
Oshkosh	WRST-FM	90.3 FM
Park Falls	WHBM	90.3 FM
Rhinelander	WXPR	91.7 FM
River Falls	WRFW	88.7 FM
Sheboygan	WSHS	91.7 FM
Sister Bay	WHDI	91.1 FM
Sister Bay	WHND	89.7 FM
Superior	KUWS	91.3 FM
Wausau	WHRM	90.9 FM
Wausau	WLBL-FM	91.9 FM
Wausau	WXPW	91.9 FM
== Wyoming ==
Afton	KUWA	91.3 FM
Buffalo	KBUW	90.5 FM
Casper	KUWC	91.3 FM
Douglas	KDUW	91.7 FM
Gillette	KUWG	90.9 FM
Jackson	KUWJ	90.3 FM
Laramie	KUWR	91.9 FM
Newcastle	KUWN	90.5 FM
Pinedale	KUWX	90.9 FM
Powell	KUWP	90.1 FM
Rock Springs	KUWZ	90.5 FM
Sheridan	KSUW	91.3 FM
Sundance	KUWD	91.5 FM
Thermopolis	KUWT	91.3 FM
