= List of NPR stations =

The following is a list of full-power non-commercial educational radio stations in the United States broadcasting programming from National Public Radio (NPR), which can be sorted by their call signs, frequencies, band, city of license and state. HD Radio subchannels and low-power translators are not included.

== Alabama ==
WBHM	90.3	FM	Birmingham
WRWA	88.7	FM	Dothan
WJAB	90.9	FM	Huntsville
WLRH	89.3	FM	Huntsville
WLJS-FM	91.9	FM	Jacksonville
WHIL	91.3	FM	Mobile
WVAS	90.7	FM	Montgomery
WTSU	89.9	FM	Montgomery–Troy
WQPR	88.7	FM	Muscle Shoals
WAPR	88.3	FM	Selma
WUAL-FM	91.5	FM	Tuscaloosa

== Alaska ==
KKET	95.9	FM	Allakaket
KSKA	91.1	FM	Anchorage
KNBA	90.3	FM	Anchorage
KMGS	89.5	FM	Anvik
KBRW	680	AM	Barrow
KBRW-FM	91.9	FM	Barrow
KYUK	640	AM	Bethel
KBUQ	91.9	FM	Buckland
KCUK	88.1	FM	Chevak
KDRG	91.9	FM	Deering
KDLG	670	AM	Dillingham
KDLG-FM	89.9	FM	Dillingham
KUAC	89.9	FM	Fairbanks
KZPA	900	AM	Fort Yukon
KIYU-FM	88.1	FM	Galena
KXGA	90.5	FM	Glennallen
KGYA	90.5	FM	Grayling
KHNS	102.3	FM	Haines
KLOP	91.5	FM	Holy Cross
KBBI	890	AM	Homer
KHUU	97.1	FM	Hughes
KIGG	103.3	FM	Igiugig
KRNN	102.7	FM	Juneau
KTOO	104.3	FM	Juneau
KXLL	100.7	FM	Juneau
KDLL	91.9	FM	Kenai
KRBD	105.9	FM	Ketchikan
KIAN	91.9	FM	Kiana
KQVK	91.9	FM	Kivalina
KMXT	100.1	FM	Kodiak
KODK	90.7	FM	Kodiak
KOTZ	720	AM	Kotzebue
KXKM	89.7	FM	McCarthy
KSKO-FM	89.5	FM	McGrath
KNIB	89.5	FM	Nikolai
KUUK	91.9	FM	Noatak
KORI	91.9	FM	Noorvik
KFSK	100.9	FM	Petersburg
KZNR	91.1	FM	Red Dog Mine
KZNC	91.9	FM	Red Dog Mine Port
KSYU	98.1	FM	Saint Marys
KSDP	830	AM	Sand Point
KIEA	91.9	FM	Selawik
KNKO	88.5	FM	Shageluk
KCAW	104.7	FM	Sitka
KUHB-FM	91.9	FM	St. Paul
KTNA	88.5	FM	Talkeetna
KTYU	99.1	FM	Tanana
KTOG	91.9	FM	Togiak
KNSA	930	AM	Unalakleet
KUCB	89.7	FM	Unalaska
KCHU	770	AM	Valdez
KSTK	101.7	FM	Wrangell

== Arizona ==
KPUB	91.7	FM	Flagstaff
KNAU	88.7	FM	Flagstaff
KNAG	90.3	FM	Grand Canyon
KUYI	88.1	FM	Hotevilla
KNAD	91.7	FM	Page
KAWP	88.9	FM	Parker
KBAQ	89.5	FM	Phoenix
KJZZ	91.5	FM	Phoenix
KNAQ	89.3	FM	Prescott
KNAA	90.7	FM	Show Low
KUAS-FM	88.9	FM	Sierra Vista
KUAT-FM	90.5	FM	Tucson
KUAZ	1550	AM	Tucson
KUAZ-FM	89.1	FM	Tucson
KNNB	88.1	FM	White River
KAWC-FM	88.9	FM	Yuma
KOFA	1320	AM	Yuma

== Arkansas ==
KBSA	90.9	FM	El Dorado
KUAF	91.3	FM	Fayetteville
KASU	91.9	FM	Jonesboro
KLRE-FM	90.5	FM	Little Rock
KUAR	89.1	FM	Little Rock

== California ==
KHSU	90.5	FM	Arcata
KPRX	89.1	FM	Bakersfield
KNHM	91.5	FM	Bayside
KRAM	90.5	FM	Borrego Springs
KNCA	89.7	FM	Burney
KQVO	97.7	FM	Calexico
KCHO	91.7	FM	Chico
KVLA-FM	90.3	FM	Coachella
KHEC	91.1	FM	Crescent City
KHSR	91.9	FM	Crescent City
KHSF	90.1	FM	Ferndale
KVPR	89.3	FM	Fresno
KHSG	89.9	FM	Garberville
KXSR	91.7	FM	Groveland
KCRI	89.3	FM	Indio
KUSC	91.5	FM	Los Angeles
KERW	101.3	FM	Los Osos–Baywood Park
KLDD	91.9	FM	McCloud
KPMO	1300	AM	Mendocino
KCRY	88.1	FM	Mojave
KESC	99.7	FM	Morro Bay
KMJC	620	AM	Mount Shasta
KNSQ	88.1	FM	Mount Shasta
KQEI-FM	89.3	FM	North Highlands
KCSN	88.5	FM	Northridge
KJAI	89.5	FM	Ojai
KCRU	89.1	FM	Oxnard
KAZU	90.3	FM	Pacific Grove
KPSC	88.5	FM	Palm Springs
KWCA	101.1	FM	Palo Cedro
KPCC	89.3	FM	Pasadena
KZYX	90.7	FM	Philo
KQNC	88.1	FM	Quincy
KFPR	88.9	FM	Redding
KUOR-FM	89.1	FM	Redlands
KNHT	102.5	FM	Rio Dell
KRCB-FM	104.9	FM	Rohnert Park
KXJZ	90.9	FM	Sacramento
KXPR	88.9	FM	Sacramento
KNBX	91.7	FM	San Ardo
KVCR	91.9	FM	San Bernardino
KPBS-FM	89.5	FM	San Diego
KSDS	88.3	FM	San Diego
KALW	91.7	FM	San Francisco
KQED-FM	88.5	FM	San Francisco
KDFC	90.3	FM	San Francisco
KCBX	90.1	FM	San Luis Obispo
KCSM	91.1	FM	San Mateo
KDRW	88.7	FM	Santa Barbara
KCLU	1340	AM	Santa Barbara
KCLM	89.7	FM	Santa Maria
KCRW	89.9	FM	Santa Monica
KRCG-FM	91.1	FM	Santa Rosa
KJPR	1330	AM	Shasta Lake City
KUOP	91.3	FM	Stockton
KXJS	88.7	FM	Sutter
KKTO	90.5	FM	Tahoe City
KCLU-FM	88.3	FM	Thousand Oaks
KDSC	91.1	FM	Thousand Oaks
KZYZ	91.5	FM	Willits
KNYR	91.3	FM	Yreka
KSYC	1490	AM	Yreka

== Colorado ==
KRZA	88.7	FM	Alamosa
KAJX	91.5	FM	Aspen
KCFC	1490	AM	Boulder
KMPB	90.7	FM	Breckenridge
KCJX	88.9	FM	Carbondale
KDNK	88.1	FM	Carbondale
KVOV	90.5	FM	Carbondale
KEPC	89.7	FM	Colorado Springs
KRCC	91.5	FM	Colorado Springs
KSJD	91.5	FM	Cortez
KPYR	88.3	FM	Craig
KBUT	90.3	FM	Crested Butte
KPRU	103.3	FM	Delta
KCFR-FM	90.1	FM	Denver
KUVO	89.3	FM	Denver
KDNG	89.3	FM	Durango
KENC	90.7	FM	Estes Park
KVXO	88.3	FM	Fort Collins
KPRN	89.5	FM	Grand Junction
KUNC	91.5	FM	Greeley
KVOQ	102.3	FM	Greenwood Village
KSUT	91.3	FM	Ignacio
KUTE	90.1	FM	Ignacio
KECC	89.1	FM	La Junta
KVOD	88.1	FM	Lakewood
KCSE	90.7	FM	Lamar
KCME	88.7	FM	Manitou Springs
KVNC	90.9	FM	Minturn
KPRH	88.3	FM	Montrose
KVMT	89.1	FM	Montrose
KPGS	88.1	FM	Pagosa Springs
KVNF	90.9	FM	Paonia
KCFP	91.9	FM	Pueblo
KICO	89.5	FM	Rico
KCCS	91.7	FM	Starkville
KRNC	88.5	FM	Steamboat Springs
KOTO	91.7	FM	Telluride
KJAC	105.5	FM	Timnath
KZET	90.5	FM	Towaoc
KPRE	89.9	FM	Vail
KVQI	88.5	FM	Vail
KWCC-FM	89.5	FM	Woodland Park

== Connecticut ==
WSHU-FM	91.1	FM	Fairfield
WVOF	88.5	FM	Fairfield
WNPR	90.5	FM	Meriden
WESU	88.1	FM	Middletown
WYBC	1340	AM	New Haven
WPKT	89.1	FM	Norwich
WHDD	1020	AM	Sharon
WHDD-FM	91.9	FM	Sharon
WQQQ	103.3	FM	Sharon
WEDW-FM	88.5	FM	Stamford
WSHU	1260	AM	Westport
WECS	90.1	FM	Willimantic

== Delaware ==
WRTX	91.7	FM	Dover
WDDE	91.1	FM	Dover
WMPH	91.7	FM	Wilmington

== Washington, D.C. ==
WAMU	88.5	FM	Washington
WETA	90.9	FM	Washington

== Florida ==
WMFV	89.5	FM	Cedar Creek
WGCU-FM	90.1	FM	Fort Myers
WQCS	88.9	FM	Fort Pierce
WUFT-FM	89.1	FM	Gainesville
WJUF	90.1	FM	Inverness
WJCT-FM	89.9	FM	Jacksonville
WKWM	91.5	FM	Marathon
WMKO	91.7	FM	Marco Island
WFIT	89.5	FM	Melbourne
WDNA	88.9	FM	Miami
WLRN-FM	91.3	FM	Miami
WMFE-FM	90.7	FM	Orlando
WUCF-FM	89.9	FM	Orlando
WFSW	89.1	FM	Panama City
WKGC-FM	90.7	FM	Panama City
WUWF	88.1	FM	Pensacola
WSMR	89.1	FM	Sarasota
WFSQ	91.5	FM	Tallahassee
WFSU-FM	88.9	FM	Tallahassee
WMNF	88.5	FM	Tampa
WUSF	89.7	FM	Tampa

== Georgia ==
WUNV	91.7	FM	Albany
WUGA	91.7	FM	Athens
WABE	90.1	FM	Atlanta
WCLK	91.9	FM	Atlanta
WRAS	88.5	FM	Atlanta
WACG-FM	90.7	FM	Augusta
WWIO-FM	89.1	FM	Brunswick
WUWG	90.7	FM	Carrollton
WNGH-FM	98.9	FM	Chatsworth
WTJB	91.7	FM	Columbus
WNGU	89.5	FM	Dahlonega
WPPR	88.3	FM	Demorest
WJWV	90.9	FM	Fort Gaines
WMUM-FM	89.7	FM	Macon
WRGC-FM	88.3	FM	Milledgeville
WGPB	97.7	FM	Rome
WSVH	91.1	FM	Savannah
WFSL	90.7	FM	Thomasville
WABR	91.1	FM	Tifton
WVVS-FM	90.9	FM	Valdosta
WWET	91.7	FM	Valdosta
WJSP-FM	88.1	FM	Warm Springs
WXVS	90.1	FM	Waycross

== Guam ==
KPRG	89.3	FM	Hagåtña

== Hawaii ==
KIPH	88.3	FM	Hana
KANO	89.1	FM	Hilo
KHPR	88.1	FM	Honolulu
KIPO	89.3	FM	Honolulu
KHPH	88.7	FM	Kailua
KJHF	103.1	FM	Kualapuu
KIPL	89.9	FM	Lihue
KAHU	91.3	FM	Pahala
KIPM	89.7	FM	Waikapu
KKUA	90.7	FM	Wailuku

== Idaho ==
KBSU	90.3	FM	Boise
KBSX	91.5	FM	Boise
KIBX	92.1	FM	Bonners Ferry
KBSY	88.5	FM	Burley
KNWO	90.1	FM	Cottonwood
KLGG	89.3	FM	Kellogg
KBSK	89.9	FM	McCall
KBSM	91.7	FM	McCall
KBSQ	90.7	FM	McCall
KRFA-FM	91.7	FM	Moscow
KISU-FM	91.1	FM	Pocatello
KBYI	94.3	FM	Rexburg
KXJO	92.1	FM	St. Maries
KBSS	91.1	FM	Sun Valley
KWRV	91.9	FM	Sun Valley
KBSW	91.7	FM	Twin Falls

== Illinois ==
WSIU	91.9	FM	Carbondale
WBEZ	91.5	FM	Chicago
WNIJ	89.5	FM	DeKalb
WSIE	88.7	FM	Edwardsville
WEPS	88.9	FM	Elgin
WNIE	89.1	FM	Freeport
WVKC	90.7	FM	Galesburg
WBEK	91.1	FM	Kankakee
WNIW	91.5	FM	LaSalle
WIUM	91.3	FM	Macomb
WBEQ	90.7	FM	Morris
WVSI	88.9	FM	Mount Vernon
WGLT	89.1	FM	Normal
WUSI	90.3	FM	Olney
WCBU	89.9	FM	Peoria
WIPA	89.3	FM	Pittsfield
WQUB	90.3	FM	Quincy
WVIK	90.3	FM	Rock Island
WNIU	90.5	FM	Rockford
WUIS	91.9	FM	Springfield
WNIQ	91.5	FM	Sterling
WILL	580	AM	Urbana
WILL-FM	90.9	FM	Urbana
WIUW	89.5	FM	Warsaw

== Indiana ==
WBSB	89.5	FM	Anderson
WFIU	103.7	FM	Bloomington
WBEW	89.5	FM	Chesterton
WNDY	91.3	FM	Crawfordsville
WVPE	88.1	FM	Elkhart
WNIN-FM	88.3	FM	Evansville
WBOI	89.1	FM	Fort Wayne
WBSH	91.1	FM	Hagerstown
WFYI-FM	90.1	FM	Indianapolis
WLPR-FM	89.1	FM	Lowell
WBSW	90.9	FM	Marion
WBST	92.1	FM	Muncie
WISU	89.7	FM	Terre Haute
WVUB	91.1	FM	Vincennes
WBAA	920	AM	West Lafayette
WBAA-FM	101.3	FM	West Lafayette

== Iowa ==
WOI	640	AM	Ames
WOI-FM	90.1	FM	Ames
KNSB	91.1	FM	Bettendorf
KNSC	90.7	FM	Carroll
KHKE	89.5	FM	Cedar Falls
KUNI	90.9	FM	Cedar Falls
KCCK-FM	88.3	FM	Cedar Rapids
KIWR	89.7	FM	Council Bluffs
KLCD	89.5	FM	Decorah
KLNI	88.7	FM	Decorah
KNSY	89.7	FM	Dubuque
KNSK	91.1	FM	Fort Dodge
KSUI	91.7	FM	Iowa City
WSUI	910	AM	Iowa City
KNSL	97.9	FM	Lamoni
KRNI	1010	AM	Mason City
KNSM	91.5	FM	Mason City
KKSO	88.9	FM	Mitchellville
KOJI	90.7	FM	Okoboji
KNSZ	89.1	FM	Ottumwa
KICW	91.1	FM	Ottumwa
KICP	105.9	FM	Patterson
KICG	91.7	FM	Perry
KICL	96.3	FM	Pleasantville
KWIT	90.3	FM	Sioux City
KBBG	88.1	FM	Waterloo

== Kansas ==
KZNK	90.1	FM	Brewster
KANQ	90.3	FM	Chanute
KZCK	88.1	FM	Colby
KZNZ	91.5	FM	Elkhart
KANH	89.7	FM	Emporia
KANZ	91.1	FM	Garden City
KZAN	91.7	FM	Hays
KZNA	90.5	FM	Hill City
KANU	91.5	FM	Lawrence
KANV	91.3	FM	Olsburg
KRPS	89.9	FM	Pittsburg
KHCC	90.1	FM	Wichita
KHCD	89.5	FM	Salina
KHCT	90.9	FM	Great Bend
KRPS	89.9	FM	Pittsburg
KMUW	89.1	FM	Wichita

== Kentucky ==
WKYU-FM	88.9	FM	Bowling Green
WEKC	88.5	FM	Corbin
WKUE	90.9	FM	Elizabethtown
WKMT	89.5	FM	Fulton
WEKH	90.9	FM	Hazard
WKPB	89.5	FM	Henderson
WEKU	88.9	FM	Richmond
WUKY	91.3	FM	Lexington
WFPK	91.9	FM	Louisville
WFPL	89.3	FM	Louisville
WUOL-FM	90.5	FM	Louisville
WKMD	90.9	FM	Madisonville
WMKY	90.3	FM	Morehead
WKMS-FM	91.3	FM	Murray
WEKP	90.1	FM	Pineville
WDCL-FM	89.7	FM	Somerset

== Louisiana ==
KLSA	90.7	FM	Alexandria
WRKF	89.3	FM	Baton Rouge
WBRH	90.3	FM	Baton Rouge
KSLU	90.9	FM	Hammond
KRVS	88.7	FM	Lafayette
KEDM	90.3	FM	Monroe
WWNO	89.9	FM	New Orleans
KDAQ	89.9	FM	Shreveport
KTLN	90.5	FM	Thibodaux

== Maine ==
WMEH	90.9	FM	Bangor
WBQA	96.7	FM	Boothbay Harbor
WMED	89.7	FM	Calais
WMEP	90.5	FM	Camden
WMEF	106.5	FM	Fort Kent
WBQF	91.7	FM	Fryeburg
WBQE	93.7	FM	Milbridge
WMEA	90.1	FM	Portland
WMEM	106.1	FM	Presque Isle
WMEW	91.3	FM	Waterville

== Northern Mariana Islands ==
KRNM	88.1	FM	Saipan

== Maryland ==
WEAA	88.9	FM	Baltimore
WYPR	88.1	FM	Baltimore
WHCP-FM	91.7	FM	Cambridge
WYPF	88.1	FM	Frederick
WFWM	91.9	FM	Frostburg
WGMS	89.1	FM	Hagerstown
WSDL	90.7	FM	Ocean City
WYPO	106.9	FM	Ocean City
WESM	91.3	FM	Princess Anne
WSCL	89.5	FM	Salisbury
WTMD	89.7	FM	Towson
WKHS	90.5	FM	Worton

== Massachusetts ==
WNNI	98.9	FM	Adams
WAMH	89.3	FM	Amherst
WFCR	88.5	FM	Amherst
WBUR-FM	90.9	FM	Boston
WGBH	89.7	FM	Boston
WUMB-FM	91.9	FM	Boston
WBUH	89.1	FM	Brewster
WZAI	94.3	FM	Brewster
WNNZ-FM	91.7	FM	Deerfield
WFPB-FM	91.9	FM	Falmouth
WAMQ	105.1	FM	Great Barrington
WNNU	89.5	FM	Great Barrington
WCRB	99.5	FM	Lowell
WNAN	91.1	FM	Nantucket
WNCK	89.5	FM	Nantucket
WNEF	91.7	FM	Newburyport
WFPB	1170	AM	Orleans
WSDH	91.5	FM	Sandwich
WBSL-FM	91.7	FM	Sheffield
WAIC	91.9	FM	Springfield
WUMG	91.7	FM	Stow
WBUA	92.7	FM	Tisbury
WNNZ	640	AM	Westfield
WCAI	90.1	FM	Woods Hole
WBPR	91.9	FM	Worcester
WICN	90.5	FM	Worcester

== Michigan ==
WGVU-FM	88.5	FM	Allendale
WCML-FM	91.7	FM	Alpena
WUOM	91.7	FM	Ann Arbor
WUCX-FM	90.1	FM	Bay City
WAUS	90.7	FM	Berrien Springs
WDET-FM	101.9	FM	Detroit
WKAR	870	AM	East Lansing
WKAR-FM	90.5	FM	East Lansing
WFUM	91.1	FM	Flint
WBLU-FM	88.9	FM	Grand Rapids
WVGR	104.1	FM	Grand Rapids
WCMW-FM	103.9	FM	Harbor Springs
WHBP	90.1	FM	Harbor Springs
WGGL-FM	91.1	FM	Houghton
WIAA	88.7	FM	Interlochen
WKDS	89.9	FM	Kalamazoo
WMUK	102.1	FM	Kalamazoo
WCMV-FM	94.3	FM	Leland
WIAB	88.5	FM	Mackinaw City
WLMN	89.7	FM	Manistee
WNMU-FM	90.1	FM	Marquette
WCMU-FM	89.5	FM	Mount Pleasant
WCMB-FM	95.7	FM	Oscoda
WRSX	91.3	FM	Port Huron
WCMZ-FM	98.3	FM	Sault Ste. Marie
WWCM	96.9	FM	Standish
WICA	91.5	FM	Traverse City
WBLV	90.3	FM	Twin Lake
WGVS-FM	95.3	FM	Whitehall
WEMU	89.1	FM	Ypsilanti

== Minnesota ==
KNCM	88.5	FM	Appleton
KRSU	91.3	FM	Appleton
KNSE	90.1	FM	Austin
KBXE	90.5	FM	Bagley
KCRB-FM	88.5	FM	Bemidji
KNBJ	91.3	FM	Bemidji
KBPN	88.3	FM	Brainerd
KBPR	90.7	FM	Brainerd
WIRN	92.5	FM	Buhl
KNSR	88.9	FM	Collegeville
KSJR-FM	90.1	FM	Collegeville
WSCN	100.5	FM	Cloquet
WDSE-FM	103.3	FM	Duluth
WSCD-FM	92.9	FM	Duluth
KCMF	89.7	FM	Fergus Falls
KNWF	91.5	FM	Fergus Falls
WLSN	89.7	FM	Grand Marais
WMLS	88.7	FM	Grand Marais
WTIP	90.7	FM	Grand Marais
WGPO	90.1	FM	Grand Portage
KAXE	91.7	FM	Grand Rapids
WGRH	88.5	FM	Hinckley
KITF	88.3	FM	International Falls
KXLC	91.1	FM	La Crescent
KMSU	89.7	FM	Mankato
KBEM-FM	88.5	FM	Minneapolis
KSJN	99.5	FM	Minneapolis
KNOW-FM	91.1	FM	Minneapolis–St. Paul
KCCD	90.3	FM	Moorhead
KCCM-FM	91.1	FM	Moorhead
KCMP	89.3	FM	Northfield
KRFI	88.1	FM	Redwood Falls
KLSE	90.7	FM	Rochester
KMSE	88.7	FM	Rochester
KZSE	91.7	FM	Rochester
KRXW	103.5	FM	Roseau
KGAC	90.5	FM	St. Peter
KNGA	91.5	FM	St. Peter
KNTN	102.7	FM	Thief River Falls
KQMN	91.5	FM	Thief River Falls
WIRR	90.9	FM	Virginia–Hibbing
KRSW	89.3	FM	Worthington
KNSW	91.7	FM	Worthington–Marshall

== Mississippi ==
WMAH-FM	90.3	FM	Biloxi
WMAE-FM	89.5	FM	Booneville
WMAU-FM	88.9	FM	Bude
WMAO-FM	90.9	FM	Greenwood
WURC	88.1	FM	Holly Springs
WJSU-FM	88.5	FM	Jackson
WMPN-FM	91.3	FM	Jackson
WPRL	91.7	FM	Lorman
WMAW-FM	88.1	FM	Meridian
WMAB-FM	89.9	FM	Mississippi State
WMAV-FM	90.3	FM	Oxford
WMSV	91.1	FM	Starkville

== Missouri ==
KSMS-FM	90.5	FM	Branson
KRCU	90.9	FM	Cape Girardeau
KRNW	88.9	FM	Chillicothe
KBIA	91.3	FM	Columbia
KMUC	90.5	FM	Columbia
KOPN	89.5	FM	Columbia
KCUR-FM	89.3	FM	Kansas City
KKTR	89.7	FM	Kirksville
KWJC	91.9	FM	Liberty
KXCV	90.5	FM	Maryville
KAUD	90.5	FM	Mexico
KMST	88.5	FM	Rolla
KSMU	91.1	FM	Springfield
KWMU	90.7	FM	St. Louis
KSEF	88.9	FM	Ste. Genevieve
KDMC-FM	88.7	FM	Van Buren
KTBG	90.9	FM	Warrensburg
KSMW	90.9	FM	West Plains

== Montana ==
KEMC	91.7	FM	Billings
KBMC	102.1	FM	Bozeman
KGLT	91.9	FM	Bozeman
KAPC	91.3	FM	Butte
KGVA	88.1	FM	Fort Belknap
KGPR	89.9	FM	Great Falls
KUFN	91.9	FM	Hamilton
KUHM	91.7	FM	Helena
KYPH	88.5	FM	Helena
KYPX	106.5	FM	Helena Valley SE
KUKL	89.9	FM	Kalispell
KUFL	90.5	FM	Libby
KYPR	90.7	FM	Miles City
KUFM	89.1	FM	Missoula
KPJH	89.5	FM	Polson

== Nebraska ==
KTNE-FM	91.1	FM	Alliance
KMNE-FM	90.3	FM	Bassett
KCNE-FM	91.9	FM	Chadron
KHNE-FM	89.1	FM	Hastings
KLNE-FM	88.7	FM	Lexington
KUCV	91.1	FM	Lincoln
KZUM	89.3	FM	Lincoln
KRNE-FM	91.5	FM	Merriman
KXNE-FM	89.3	FM	Norfolk
KPNE-FM	91.7	FM	North Platte
KIOS-FM	91.5	FM	Omaha

== Nevada ==
KLKR	89.3	FM	Elko
KNCC	91.5	FM	Elko
KBSJ	91.3	FM	Jackpot
KCNV	89.7	FM	Las Vegas
KNPR	88.9	FM	Las Vegas
KWPR	88.7	FM	Lund
KLNR	91.7	FM	Panaca
KNCJ	89.5	FM	Reno
KUNR	88.7	FM	Reno
KVNV	89.1	FM	Reno
KTPH	91.7	FM	Tonopah

== New Hampshire ==
WEVF	90.3	FM	Colebrook
WCNH	90.5	FM	Concord
WEVO	89.1	FM	Concord
WEVC	107.1	FM	Gorham
WEVH	91.3	FM	Hanover
WEVJ	99.5	FM	Jackson
WEVN	90.7	FM	Keene
WEVQ	91.9	FM	Littleton
WEVS	88.3	FM	Nashua

== New Jersey ==
WNJZ	90.3	FM	Cape May
WWCJ	89.1	FM	Cape May
WXPJ	91.9	FM	Hackettstown
WBJB-FM	90.5	FM	Lincroft
WNJM	89.9	FM	Manahawkin
WNJY	89.3	FM	Netcong
WBGO	88.3	FM	Newark
WQXR-FM	105.9	FM	Newark
WRTQ	91.3	FM	Ocean City
WNJP	88.5	FM	Sussex
WNJO	90.3	FM	Toms River
WWNJ	91.1	FM	Toms River Township
WNJT-FM	88.1	FM	Trenton
WWFM	89.1	FM	Trenton

== New Mexico ==
KANW	89.1	FM	Albuquerque
KUNM	89.9	FM	Albuquerque
KRRT	90.9	FM	Arroyo Seco
KENU	88.5	FM	Des Moines
KCIE	90.5	FM	Dulce
KENE	88.1	FM	Raton
KRAR	91.9	FM	Espanola
KUUT	89.7	FM	Farmington
KUSW	88.1	FM	Flora Vista
KGLP	91.7	FM	Gallup
KANM	90.3	FM	Grants
KIDS	88.1	FM	Grants
KRWG	90.7	FM	Las Cruces
KRRE	91.9	FM	Las Vegas
KMTH	98.7	FM	Maljamar
KENW-FM	89.5	FM	Portales
KTDB	89.7	FM	Ramah
KENG	88.5	FM	Ruidoso
KANR	91.9	FM	Santa Rosa
KRXG	91.3	FM	Silver City
KBOM	88.7	FM	Socorro
KENM	88.9	FM	Tucumcari

== New York ==
WAMC	1400	AM	Albany
WAMC-FM	90.3	FM	Albany
WEXT	97.7	FM	Amsterdam
WLHV	88.1	FM	Annandale-on-Hudson
WSKG-FM	89.3	FM	Binghamton
WSQX-FM	91.5	FM	Binghamton
WXLH	91.3	FM	Blue Mountain Lake
WXLB	91.7	FM	Boonville
WANR	88.5	FM	Brewster
WBFO	88.7	FM	Buffalo
WNED-FM	94.5	FM	Buffalo
WCAN	93.3	FM	Canajoharie
WREM	88.7	FM	Canton
WSLU	89.5	FM	Canton
WSLZ	88.1	FM	Cape Vincent
WRVH	89.3	FM	Clayton
WSUC-FM	90.5	FM	Cortland
WSQE	91.1	FM	Corning
WMVQ	90.5	FM	Fenner
WCVF-FM	91.3	FM	Fredonia
WEOS	89.5	FM	Geneva
WSLG	90.5	FM	Gouverneur
WSQN	88.1	FM	Greene
WRCU-FM	90.1	FM	Hamilton
WSQA	88.7	FM	Hornell
WXXY	90.3	FM	Houghton
WXLE	105.9	FM	Indian Lake
WITH	90.1	FM	Ithaca
WSQG-FM	90.9	FM	Ithaca
WUBJ	88.1	FM	Jamestown
WNJA	89.7	FM	Jamestown
WJFF	90.5	FM	Jeffersonville
WAMK	90.9	FM	Kingston
WXLL	91.7	FM	Lake Placid
WXLD	89.7	FM	Lowville
WSLO	90.9	FM	Malone
WOSR	91.7	FM	Middletown
WWES	88.9	FM	Mount Kisco
WFUV	90.7	FM	New York
WNYC	820	AM	New York
WNYC-FM	93.9	FM	New York
WNYE	91.5	FM	New York
WXLG	89.9	FM	North Creek
WSUF	89.9	FM	Noyack
WRFI	89.7	FM	Odessa
WOLN	91.3	FM	Olean
WSQC-FM	91.7	FM	Oneonta
WRVO	89.9	FM	Oswego
WXLU	88.1	FM	Peru
WCEL	91.9	FM	Plattsburgh
WRHV	88.7	FM	Poughkeepsie
WRUN	90.3	FM	Remsen
WXXI	1370	AM	Rochester
WXXI-FM	105.9	FM	Rochester
WXXO	91.5	FM	Rochester
WRUR-FM	88.5	FM	Rochester
WSLL	90.5	FM	Saranac Lake
WMHT-FM	89.1	FM	Schenectady
WOXR	90.9	FM	Schuyler Falls
WLIW-FM	88.3	FM	Southampton
WRLI-FM	91.3	FM	Southampton
WANZ	90.1	FM	Stamford
WAER	88.3	FM	Syracuse
WCNY-FM	91.3	FM	Syracuse
WRVD	90.3	FM	Syracuse
WANC	103.9	FM	Ticonderoga
WXLS	88.3	FM	Tupper Lake
WRVN	91.9	FM	Utica
WUNY	89.5	FM	Utica
WJNY	90.9	FM	Watertown
WRVJ	91.7	FM	Watertown
WSLJ	88.9	FM	Watertown

== North Carolina ==
WCQS	88.1	FM	Asheville
WBJD	91.5	FM	Atlantic Beach
WZPE	90.1	FM	Bath
WBUX	90.5	FM	Buxton
WUNC	91.5	FM	Chapel Hill
WFAE	90.7	FM	Charlotte
WSGE	91.7	FM	Dallas
WDAV	89.9	FM	Davidson
WNCU	90.7	FM	Durham
WRVS-FM	89.9	FM	Elizabeth City
WFSS	91.9	FM	Fayetteville
WFQS	91.3	FM	Franklin
WFHE	90.3	FM	Hickory
WKNS	90.3	FM	Kinston
WUND-FM	88.9	FM	Manteo
WURI	91.5	FM	Manteo
WYQS	90.5	FM	Mars Hill
WMQS	88.5	FM	Murphy
WTEB	89.3	FM	New Bern
WZNB	88.5	FM	New Bern
WCPE	89.7	FM	Raleigh
WRQM	90.9	FM	Rocky Mount
WNCW	88.7	FM	Spindale
WSIF	90.9	FM	Wilkesboro
WHQR	91.3	FM	Wilmington
WFDD	88.5	FM	Winston-Salem
WSNC	90.5	FM	Winston-Salem

== North Dakota ==
KEYA	88.5	FM	Belcourt
KCND	90.5	FM	Bismarck
KPPD	91.7	FM	Devils Lake
KDPR	89.9	FM	Dickinson
KDSU	91.9	FM	Fargo
KUND-FM	89.3	FM	Grand Forks
KFJM	90.7	FM	Grand Forks
KPRJ	91.5	FM	Jamestown
KMPR	88.9	FM	Minot
KPPR	89.5	FM	Williston
KPPW	88.7	FM	Williston

== Ohio ==
WOUB	1340	AM	Athens
WOUB-FM	91.3	FM	Athens
WGBE	90.9	FM	Bryan
WOUC-FM	89.1	FM	Cambridge
WOUH-FM	91.9	FM	Chillicothe
WGUC	90.9	FM	Cincinnati
WVXU	91.7	FM	Cincinnati
WCLV	90.3	FM	Cleveland
WCBE	90.5	FM	Columbus
WOSU-FM	89.7	FM	Columbus
WOSE	91.1	FM	Coshocton
WDPR	88.1	FM	Dayton
WGDE	91.9	FM	Defiance
WOSA	101.1	FM	Grove City
WOUL-FM	89.1	FM	Ironton
WKSU	89.7	FM	Kent–Cleveland
WGLE	90.7	FM	Lima
WCPN	104.9	FM	Lorain
WOSV	91.7	FM	Mansfield
WOSB	91.1	FM	Marion
WNRK	90.7	FM	Norwalk
WKRJ	91.5	FM	New Philadelphia
WMUB	88.5	FM	Oxford
WOSP	91.5	FM	Portsmouth
WKSV	89.1	FM	Thompson
WGTE-FM	91.3	FM	Toledo
WCSU-FM	88.9	FM	Wilberforce
WKRW	89.3	FM	Wooster
WYSO	91.3	FM	Yellow Springs
WYSU	88.5	FM	Youngstown
WOUZ-FM	90.1	FM	Zanesville

== Oklahoma ==
KOUA	91.9	FM	Ada
KOCU	90.1	FM	Altus
KLCU	90.3	FM	Ardmore
KQOU	89.1	FM	Clinton
KGUY	91.3	FM	Guymon
KOSN	107.5	FM	Ketchum
KCCU	89.3	FM	Lawton
KGOU	106.3	FM	Norman
KROU	105.7	FM	Oklahoma City
KOSR	88.3	FM	Stillwater
KOSU	91.7	FM	Stillwater
KWGS	89.5	FM	Tulsa
KWTU	88.7	FM	Tulsa
KWOU	88.1	FM	Woodward

== Oregon ==
KSMF	89.1	FM	Ashland
KSOR	90.1	FM	Ashland
KSRG	88.3	FM	Ashland
KMUN	91.9	FM	Astoria
KOAC-FM	89.7	FM	Astoria
KOBK	88.9	FM	Baker City
KLBR	88.1	FM	Bend
KOAB-FM	91.3	FM	Bend
KOBN	90.1	FM	Burns
KSBA	88.5	FM	Coos Bay
KZBY	90.5	FM	Coos Bay
KOAC	550	AM	Corvallis
KETP	88.7	FM	Enterprise
KLCC	89.7	FM	Eugene
KOPB	1600	AM	Eugene
KRVM	1280	AM	Eugene
KLFO	88.1	FM	Florence
KOGL	89.3	FM	Gleneden Beach
KAGI	930	AM	Grants Pass
KMHD	89.1	FM	Gresham
KHRV	90.1	FM	Hood River
KOJD	89.7	FM	John Day
KLMF	88.5	FM	Klamath Falls
KSKF	90.9	FM	Klamath Falls
KTVR-FM	90.3	FM	La Grande
KOAP	88.7	FM	Lakeview
KOOZ	94.1	FM	Myrtle Point
KLCO	90.5	FM	Newport
KRBM	90.9	FM	Pendleton
KOPB-FM	91.5	FM	Portland
KLFR	89.1	FM	Reedsport
KSRS	91.5	FM	Roseburg
KTBR	950	AM	Roseburg
KMPQ	88.1	FM	Roseburg
KSJK	1230	AM	Talent
KOTD	89.7	FM	The Dalles
KTCB	89.5	FM	Tillamook
KTMK	91.1	FM	Tillamook
KWSO	91.9	FM	Warm Springs
KCPB-FM	90.9	FM	Warrenton

== Pennsylvania ==
WDIY	88.1	FM	Allentown
WLVR-FM	91.3	FM	Bethlehem
WYPM	93.3	FM	Chambersburg
WRTJ	89.3	FM	Coatesville
WRTL	90.7	FM	Ephrata
WQLN-FM	91.3	FM	Erie
WITF-FM	89.5	FM	Harrisburg
WRTY	91.1	FM	Jackson Township
WQEJ	89.7	FM	Johnstown
WPSX	90.1	FM	Kane
WVBU-FM	90.5	FM	Lewisburg
WTIO	88.3	FM	Mainesburg
WXPH	88.7	FM	Middletown
WPAU	91.5	FM	Palmyra Township
WWPJ	89.5	FM	Pen Argyl
WHYY-FM	90.9	FM	Philadelphia
WRTI	90.1	FM	Philadelphia
WXPN	88.5	FM	Philadelphia
WESA	90.5	FM	Pittsburgh
WQED-FM	89.3	FM	Pittsburgh
WYEP-FM	91.3	FM	Pittsburgh
WVIA-FM	89.9	FM	Scranton
WPSU	91.5	FM	State College
WJAZ	91.7	FM	Summerdale
WVYA	89.7	FM	Williamsport

== Puerto Rico ==
WRTU	89.7	FM	Río Piedras

== Rhode Island ==
WPVD	1290	AM	Providence
WNPN	89.3	FM	Newport
WCVY	91.5	FM	Coventry
WNPE	102.7	FM	Narragansett

== South Carolina ==
WLJK	89.1	FM	Aiken
WJWJ-FM	89.9	FM	Beaufort
WSCI	89.3	FM	Charleston
WLTR	91.3	FM	Columbia
WHMC-FM	90.1	FM	Conway
WEPR	90.1	FM	Greenville
WSSB-FM	90.3	FM	Orangeburg
WNSC-FM	88.9	FM	Rock Hill
WRJA-FM	88.1	FM	Sumter

== South Dakota ==
KESD	88.3	FM	Brookings
KPSD-FM	97.1	FM	Faith
KQSD-FM	91.9	FM	Lowry
KZSD-FM	102.5	FM	Martin
KDSD-FM	90.9	FM	Pierpont
KBHE-FM	89.3	FM	Rapid City
KTSD-FM	91.1	FM	Reliance
KAUR	89.1	FM	Sioux Falls
KCSD	90.9	FM	Sioux Falls
KRSD	88.1	FM	Sioux Falls
KYSD	91.9	FM	Spearfish
KUSD	89.7	FM	Vermillion
KJSD	90.3	FM	Watertown

== Tennessee ==
WUTC	88.1	FM	Chattanooga
WSMC-FM	90.5	FM	Collegedale
WHRS	91.7	FM	Cookeville
WKNP	90.1	FM	Jackson
WETS-FM	89.5	FM	Johnson City
WUOT	91.9	FM	Knoxville
WKNO-FM	91.1	FM	Memphis
WMOT	89.5	FM	Murfreesboro
WPLN-FM	90.3	FM	Nashville
WNXP	91.1	FM	Nashville

== Texas ==
KACU	89.5	FM	Abilene
KRTP	91.7	FM	Alpine
KACV-FM	89.9	FM	Amarillo
KJJP	105.7	FM	Amarillo
KMFA	89.5	FM	Austin
KUT	90.5	FM	Austin
KVLU	91.3	FM	Beaumont
KTXP	91.5	FM	Bushland
KAMU-FM	90.9	FM	College Station
KEOS	89.1	FM	College Station
KETR	88.9	FM	Commerce
KEDT-FM	90.3	FM	Corpus Christi
KTDH	89.3	FM	Dalhart
KERA	90.1	FM	Dallas
KKXT	91.7	FM	Dallas
KTPD	89.3	FM	Del Rio
KTEP	88.5	FM	El Paso
KCTI	1450	AM	Gonzales
KUHF	88.7	FM	Houston
KTXI	90.1	FM	Ingram
KUTX	98.9	FM	Leander
KVHL	91.7	FM	Llano
KTTZ-FM	89.1	FM	Lubbock
KLDN	88.9	FM	Lufkin
KDKY	91.5	FM	Marathon
KRTS	93.5	FM	Marfa
KXWT	91.3	FM	Odessa
KTYK	100.7	FM	Overton
KPVU	91.3	FM	Prairie View
KOJP	95.3	FM	Presidio
KNCH	90.1	FM	San Angelo
KSTX	89.1	FM	San Antonio
KPAC	88.3	FM	San Antonio
KXBT	88.1	FM	Somerville
KTOT	89.5	FM	Spearman
KTPR	89.9	FM	Stanton
KTRL	90.5	FM	Stephenville
KTXK	91.5	FM	Texarkana
KVUT	99.7	FM	Tyler
KVRT	90.7	FM	Victoria
KWBU-FM	103.3	FM	Waco
KMCU	88.7	FM	Wichita Falls

== Utah ==
KUQU	93.9	FM	Enoch
KUEU	90.5	FM	Logan
KUSR	89.5	FM	Logan
KUSU-FM	91.5	FM	Logan
KUST	88.7	FM	Moab
KUXU	88.3	FM	Monroe
KUHU	88.1	FM	Monticello
KPCW	91.7	FM	Park City
KCEU	89.7	FM	Price
KUSL	89.3	FM	Richfield
KUOU	89.3	FM	Roosevelt
KRCL	90.9	FM	Salt Lake City
KUER-FM	90.1	FM	Salt Lake City
KUSK	88.5	FM	Vernal

== U.S. Virgin Islands ==
WTJX-FM	93.1	FM	Charlotte Amalie

== Vermont ==
WBTN-FM	94.3	FM	Bennington
WVBA	88.9	FM	Brattleboro
WVTI	106.9	FM	Brighton
WXLQ	90.5	FM	Bristol
WVPS	107.9	FM	Burlington
WVTX	88.7	FM	Colchester
WVNK	91.1	FM	Manchester
WOXM	90.1	FM	Middlebury
WNCH	88.1	FM	Norwich
WVXR	102.1	FM	Randolph
WRVT	88.7	FM	Rutland
WVPA	88.5	FM	St. Johnsbury
WVTQ	95.1	FM	Sunderland
WVPR	89.5	FM	Windsor

== Virginia ==
WHRF	98.3	FM	Belle Haven
WNRN-FM	91.9	FM	Charlottesville
WVTU	89.3	FM	Charlottesville
WVTW	88.5	FM	Charlottesville
WRIQ	89.7	FM	Charles City
WMVE	90.1	FM	Chase City
WWVT	1260	AM	Christiansburg
WMRY	103.5	FM	Crozet
WHRE	91.9	FM	Eastville
WEHC	90.7	FM	Emory
WHRL	88.1	FM	Emporia
WWLB	93.1	FM	Ettrick
WMLU	91.3	FM	Farmville
WWVT-FM	89.9	FM	Ferrum
WHRJ	89.9	FM	Gloucester Courthouse
WHRG	88.5	FM	Gloucester Point
WEMC	91.7	FM	Harrisonburg
WMRA	90.7	FM	Harrisonburg
WCNV	89.1	FM	Heathsville
WCHG	107.1	FM	Hot Springs
WIQR	88.7	FM	Lexington
WLUR	91.5	FM	Lexington
WMRL	89.9	FM	Lexington
WVTR	91.9	FM	Marion
WVLS	89.7	FM	Monterey
WHRX	90.1	FM	Nassawadox
WHRO-FM	90.3	FM	Norfolk
WHRV	89.5	FM	Norfolk
WBBT-FM	107.3	FM	Powhatan
WVRU-FM	89.9	FM	Radford
WCVE-FM	88.9	FM	Richmond
WVTF	89.1	FM	Roanoke
WQIQ	88.3	FM	Spotsylvania
WISE-FM	90.5	FM	Wise

== Washington ==
KPBW	91.9	FM	Brewster
KQOW	90.3	FM	Bellingham
KZAZ	91.7	FM	Bellingham
KSWS	88.9	FM	Chehalis
KNWV	90.5	FM	Clarkston
KNWR	90.7	FM	Ellensburg
KNWU	91.5	FM	Forks
KHNW	88.3	FM	Manson
KLWS	91.5	FM	Moses Lake
KMWS	90.1	FM	Mount Vernon
KPLI	90.1	FM	Olympia
KOMQ	88.5	FM	Omak
KQWS	90.1	FM	Omak
KPBG	90.9	FM	Oroville
KNWP	90.1	FM	Port Angeles
KVIX	89.3	FM	Port Angeles
KJEM	89.9	FM	Pullman
KWSU	1250	AM	Pullman
KFAE-FM	89.1	FM	Richland
KEXP-FM	90.3	FM	Seattle
KUOW-FM	94.9	FM	Seattle
KPLK	88.9	FM	Sedro-Woolley
KPBX-FM	91.1	FM	Spokane
KPBZ	90.3	FM	Spokane
KSFC	91.9	FM	Spokane
KNKX	88.5	FM	Tacoma
KVTI	90.9	FM	Tacoma
KUOW	1340	AM	Tumwater
KTWP	91.1	FM	Twisp
KWWS	89.7	FM	Walla Walla
KNWY	90.3	FM	Yakima
KYVT	88.5	FM	Yakima

== West Virginia ==
WVBY	91.7	FM	Beckley
WVBL	88.5	FM	Bluefield
WVPW	88.9	FM	Buckhannon
WVPB	88.5	FM	Charleston
WVMR	1370	AM	Frost
WVWV	89.9	FM	Huntington
WVEP	88.9	FM	Martinsburg
WVKM	106.7	FM	Matewan
WVPM	90.9	FM	Morgantown
WVPG	90.3	FM	Parkersburg
WVDS	89.5	FM	Petersburg
WVWS	89.3	FM	Webster Springs
WVNP	89.9	FM	Wheeling

== Wisconsin ==
WHAA	89.1	FM	Adams
WUWS	90.9	FM	Ashland
WLBL	930	AM	Auburndale
WHSA	89.9	FM	Brule
WHAD	90.7	FM	Delafield
WUEC	89.7	FM	Eau Claire
WHID	88.1	FM	Green Bay
WPNE	89.3	FM	Green Bay
WOJB	88.9	FM	Hayward
WHHI	91.3	FM	Highland
WGTD	91.1	FM	Kenosha
WHLA	90.3	FM	La Crosse
WLSU	88.9	FM	La Crosse
WERN	88.7	FM	Madison
WHA	970	AM	Madison
WHWC	88.3	FM	Menomonie
WVSS	90.7	FM	Menomonie
WUWM	89.7	FM	Milwaukee
WYMS	88.9	FM	Milwaukee
WRST-FM	90.3	FM	Oshkosh
WHBM	90.3	FM	Park Falls
WSSW	89.1	FM	Platteville
WHSF	89.9	FM	Rhinelander
WXPR	91.7	FM	Rhinelander
WRFW	88.7	FM	River Falls
WSHS	91.7	FM	Sheboygan
WHDI	91.1	FM	Sister Bay
WHND	89.7	FM	Sister Bay
KUWS	91.3	FM	Superior
WSSU	88.5	FM	Superior
WHWA	104.7	FM	Washburn
WHRM	90.9	FM	Wausau
WLBL-FM	91.9	FM	Wausau
WXPW	91.9	FM	Wausau

== Wyoming ==
KUWA	91.3	FM	Afton
KBUW	90.5	FM	Buffalo
KUWC	91.3	FM	Casper
KDUW	91.7	FM	Douglas
KUWE	89.7	FM	Evanston
KUWW	90.9	FM	Fort Washakie
KUWG	90.9	FM	Gillette
KUWJ	90.3	FM	Jackson
KUWK	88.7	FM	Kaycee
KUWL	90.1	FM	Laramie
KUWR	91.9	FM	Laramie
KUWY	88.5	FM	Laramie
KUWV	90.7	FM	Lingle
KUWN	90.5	FM	Newcastle
KUWX	90.9	FM	Pinedale
KUWP	90.1	FM	Powell
KUWI	89.9	FM	Rawlins
KZUW	88.5	FM	Reliance
KUWZ	90.5	FM	Rock Springs
KAIW	88.9	FM	Saratoga
KPRQ	88.1	FM	Sheridan
KSUW	91.3	FM	Sheridan
KUWD	91.5	FM	Sundance
KUWT	91.3	FM	Thermopolis
KEUW	89.9	FM	Torrington

== International ==
AFN	Internet	US Air Force/US Military
