= KISU =

KISU may refer to:

- KISU-FM, a radio station (91.1 FM) licensed to Pocatello, Idaho, United States
- KISU-TV, a television station (channel 10 analog/17 digital) licensed to Pocatello, Idaho, United States
- Kīsu, the Japanese name for Keese, a creature from the Legend of Zelda video game series
- Kisu-shelter an emergency shelter tent used in mountain rescue
- Kim Il-sung University in Pyongyang, North Korea
