= KMTH =

KMTH may refer to:

- The ICAO code for Florida Keys Marathon Airport
- KMTH (FM), a radio station (98.7 FM) licensed to Maljamar, New Mexico, United States, a satellite of KENW-FM
- The former name of the American Forces Network radio (KMTH/900, KMTH-FM/94.0) and television stations (KMTH-TV) on Midway Atoll)
