= WIPA (disambiguation) =

WIPA is an FM radio station in Pittsfield, Illinois.

WIPA may also refer to:

- West Indies Players' Association
- Sultan Thaha Airport (ICAO: WIPA), Jambi City, Jambi, Sumatra
