= KMSE =

Current public radio station in Rochester, Minnesota, United States

Satellite of KCMP, Northfield/Minneapolis–Saint Paul
- Rochester, Minnesota; United States
- Frequency: 88.7 MHz (HD Radio)
- Branding: "The Current"

Programming
- Format: Public; AAA
- Affiliations: Minnesota Public Radio, NPR, American Public Media

Ownership
- Owner: Minnesota Public Radio
- Sister stations: KLSE, KZSE

History
- First air date: October 1998

Technical information
- Licensing authority: FCC
- Facility ID: 83876
- Class: A
- ERP: 850 watts
- HAAT: 170.9 m (561 ft)
- Transmitter coordinates: 44.041°N 92.341°W

Links
- Public license information: Public file; LMS
- Webcast: Stream PLS
- Website: thecurrent.org

KMSE (88.7 FM) is a radio station licensed to Rochester, Minnesota. The station is owned by Minnesota Public Radio (MPR), and airs MPR's "The Current" network, consisting of an Adult Album Alternative music format originating from KCMP in Northfield, Minnesota.

- See also Minnesota Public Radio
