= KUAR =

Public radio station in Little Rock, Arkansas

Coordinates: 34.7970°N 92.4890°W

KUAR and KLRE-FM
- Little Rock, Arkansas; United States
- Broadcast area: Little Rock metropolitan area
- Frequencies: KUAR: 89.1 MHz (HD Radio); KLRE-FM: 90.5 MHz (HD Radio)
- Branding: Little Rock Public Radio

Programming
- Format: KUAR: Public radio (News / talk / jazz); KLRE-FM: Classical music
- Subchannels: KUAR-HD2: Same as HD1
- Affiliations: KUAR: NPR, American Public Media, Public Radio International, Jazz 24; KLRE-FM: Classical 24, NPR

Ownership
- Owner: UALR Public Radio (University of Arkansas at Little Rock); (Board of Trustees of the University of Arkansas)

History
- First air date: KUAR: September 16, 1986; KLRE-FM: February 1973
- Call sign meaning: KUAR: University of Arkansas; KLRE-FM: "Little Rock Educational"

Technical information
- Facility ID: KUAR: 4296; KLRE-FM: 37788
- Class: KUAR: C1; KLRE-FM: C2
- ERP: KUAR: 63,000 watts KLRE-FM: 40,000 watts
- HAAT: KUAR: 342 meters (1122 ft); KLRE-FM: 75 meters (246 ft)
- Translator: KUAR: 94.5 K233AD (Monticello)

Links
- Webcast: Listen live
- Website: KUAR.org

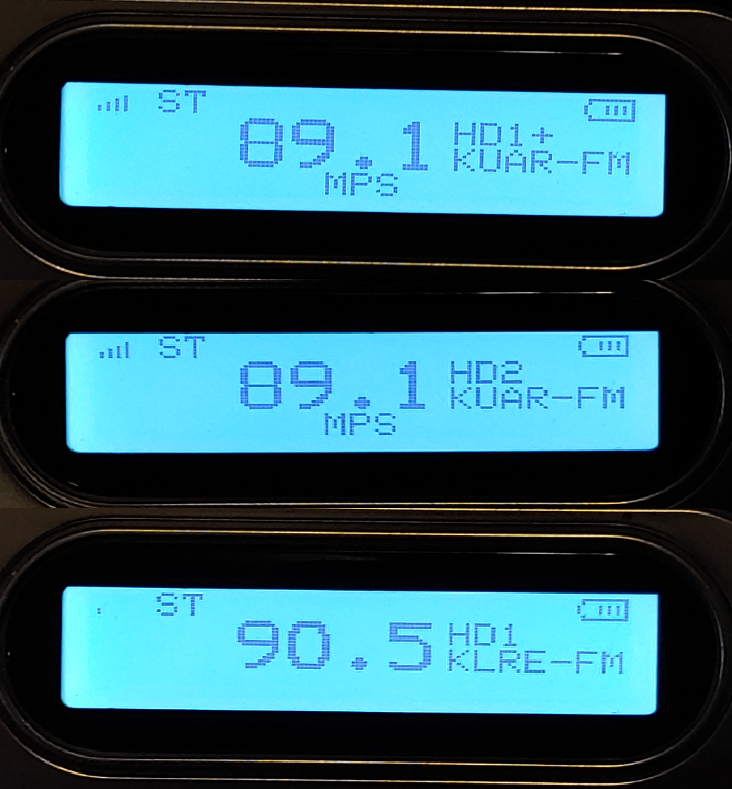
KUAR and KLRE broadcasting in HD with all of the subchannels.

KUAR (89.1 MHz, "Little Rock Public Radio") is a public radio station in Little Rock, Arkansas. It is a network affiliate of National Public Radio (NPR) and is licensed to the University of Arkansas at Little Rock. During the day, KUAR airs NPR news, talk and information programming as well as Arkansas news and culture. At night, the station airs jazz music. Programming is simulcast on a translator station, 94.5 K233AD in Monticello. KUAR's transmitter shares the tower of Channel 7 KATV, on Two Towers Road in Little Rock.

KLRE-FM (90.5 MHz, "Little Rock Public Radio") is also a public radio station in Little Rock, licensed to the University of Arkansas at Little Rock. KLRE-FM is a full-time classical music station, airing syndicated classical programming from Classical 24 and NPR, along with some local hosts. KLRE-FM's transmitter is on the campus of Metropolitan High School, off Scott Hamilton Drive.

The two stations have studios and offices on Asher Avenue in Little Rock's University District. A full-time staff of nine people run the operation, including Interim General Manager/Program Director Nathan Vandiver, Operations Director William Wagner, News Director Michael Hibblen, and Development Director Vanessa McKuin. The stations also offers UALR students the chance to get broadcasting experience by working part-time. Like most public broadcasting operations, KUAR and KLRE-FM rely on listener contributions for a large part of their operating budgets and several times each year hold on-air fund raisers.

== History ==
In 1972, the Little Rock School District was planning a new vocational high school and wanted to include a small FM radio station to train students in the field of broadcasting. In February 1973, 90.5 KLRE-FM first signed on. At first, KLRE-FM was powered at only 3,600 watts on a 265 foot tower, so its coverage was limited to the city of Little Rock and adjacent communities. It was on the air during school hours, 9 a.m. to 3:30 p.m., airing educational and classroom programming, largely staffed by students and teachers.

In 1977, the "Friends of KLRE" was formed to support the station, which expanded its hours, on the air from 6:30 a.m. till 10 p.m., playing classical music in the evening and, beginning in 1978, on weekends as well. Also in 1978, the Arkansas Broadcasting Foundation was formed to take over the Federal Communications Commission (FCC) license.

In 1982, UALR received an FCC construction permit to build an additional non-commercial FM station at 89.1. In 1983, KLRE-FM's power was increased to its current 40,000 watts, covering Little Rock and its suburbs, adding NPR programs such as All Things Considered and A Prairie Home Companion the following year.

On September 16, 1986, KUAR began broadcasting. It is powered at 100,000 watts, the maximum permitted by the FCC for non-grandfathered FM stations, covering most of Central Arkansas. At first, KUAR and KLRE-FM simulcast their programming. But in 1988, the two stations began carrying separate shows during the day, with classical music continuing on KLRE-FM while KUAR began airing all news and information during the daytime.

UALR and the Little Rock School District jointly owned the two stations until 1995, when UALR became the sole owner. Both stations continued to simulcast classical programming at night until 2000, when KUAR began broadcasting jazz music from 10 p.m. until 5 a.m.

On August 28, 2023, the stations rebranded as "Little Rock Public Radio".
