= KCCU =

Public radio station in Lawton, Oklahoma

- Lawton, Oklahoma; United States
- Broadcast area: Southwestern Oklahoma
- Frequency: 89.3 MHz (HD Radio)
- Branding: KCCU

Programming
- Format: Public radio
- Affiliations: National Public Radio

Ownership
- Owner: Cameron University

History
- First air date: July 13, 1989
- Call sign meaning: KC Cameron University

Technical information
- Licensing authority: FCC
- Facility ID: 8484
- Class: C3
- ERP: 5,000 watts
- HAAT: 141 meters (463 ft)
- Transmitter coordinates: 34°37′24″N 98°16′16″W
- Repeater: (see article)

Links
- Public license information: Public file; LMS
- Webcast: Listen live
- Website: kccu.org

KCCU (89.3 FM), is a National Public Radio member radio station in Lawton, Oklahoma, owned by Cameron University.

== Repeaters ==
Call sign	Frequency	City of license	State	ERP W	Height m (ft)	Class	FCC info
KOCU	90.1 FM	Altus	Oklahoma	5,000	26 m (85 ft)	A	FCC (KOCU)
KLCU	90.3 FM	Ardmore	Oklahoma	25,000	65 m (213 ft)	C3	FCC (KLCU)
KMCU	88.7 FM	Wichita Falls	Texas	3,000	77 m (253 ft)	A	FCC (KMCU)

Broadcast translator for KCCU
Call sign	Frequency	City of license	FID	ERP (W)	Class	FCC info
K275AE	102.9 FM	Lawton, Oklahoma	82287	250	D	LMS
