= WHND =

- Sister Bay, Wisconsin; United States
- Broadcast area: Door County, Wisconsin
- Frequency: 89.7 MHz

Programming
- Format: Public radio, classical music, news
- Affiliations: Wisconsin Public Radio; NPR; American Public Media

Ownership
- Owner: State of Wisconsin - Educational Communications Board; (State of Wisconsin - Educational Communications Board)

History
- First air date: 1998
- Former call signs: WAQB (2/1998-11/1998); WHDI (11/2/1998-11/17/1998)
- Call sign meaning: disambiguation of WHA, Northern Door County

Technical information
- Licensing authority: FCC
- Facility ID: 83612
- Class: C3
- ERP: 3,400 watts
- HAAT: 164 meters (538 ft)

Links
- Public license information: Public file; LMS
- Webcast: Listen Live
- Website: wpr.org

WHND (89.7 FM) is a radio station licensed to Sister Bay, Wisconsin, United States, serving the Door County area. The station is part of Wisconsin Public Radio (WPR), and broadcasts WPR's "NPR News and Classical Network", consisting of classical music and news and talk programming.
