= KXCV =

- Maryville, Missouri; United States
- Frequency: 90.5 MHz(HD Radio)
- Branding: Northwest Missouri Public Radio

Programming
- Format: News Talk Information
- Affiliations: American Public Media, National Public Radio

Ownership
- Owner: Northwest Missouri State Univ.

History
- Call sign meaning: XCV=Roman numeral for 95

Technical information
- Licensing authority: FCC
- Facility ID: 49746
- Class: C1
- ERP: 100,000 watts
- HAAT: 193.1 meters (634 ft)
- Transmitter coordinates: 40°24′9.00″N 94°53′16.00″W

Links
- Public license information: Public file; LMS
- Website: kxcv.org

KXCV (90.5 FM) is a radio station broadcasting a News Talk Information format. Licensed to Maryville, Missouri, United States. The station is owned by Northwest Missouri State University and features programming from American Public Media and National Public Radio. The station is the National Public Radio radio station of Northwest Missouri State University and was the first full-power (100 kW) public radio station in Missouri in 1971.

The station with its repeater KRNW (Radio Northwest) in Chillicothe, Missouri, covers the northwest corner of Missouri as well as sections of Iowa, Kansas, and Nebraska.

It is the flagship station of the Bearcat Radio Network which broadcasts the university's football games (as well as men's and women's basketball games). Interest in the football games skyrocketed after Northwest won national NCAA Division II championships in 1998, 1999, 2009 and 2013 with five additional appearances in the title game during the same time period. Other members of the network are KCXL AM & FM (Liberty, Missouri), KKWK-FM (Cameron, Missouri), and KMA in Shenandoah, Iowa.

The station originally broadcast from the top floor of the university's Administration Building. Its facilities were destroyed in a catastrophic fire in the building in 1979. It now broadcasts from Well's Hall which is the remodeled former library of the school.

KXCV (XCV - Roman numbers for 95) is located at 90.5 on the FM. KRNW is at 88.9. KXCV broadcasts at 100 kW while KRNW broadcasts at 38 kW.
