= KCHU =

- Valdez, Alaska; United States
- Broadcast area: Chugach Census Area; Copper River Census Area
- Frequency: 770 kHz
- Branding: KCHU

Programming
- Format: Public Radio
- Affiliations: NPR; Public Radio Exchange

Ownership
- Owner: Terminal Radio, Inc.
- Sister stations: KXGA; KXKM

History
- First air date: August 2, 1986

Technical information
- Licensing authority: FCC
- Facility ID: 65232
- Class: A (clear channel)
- Power: 9,700 watts
- Transmitter coordinates: 61°06′38.1″N 146°15′46.3″W
- Repeaters: (89.7 MHz) KXKM (McCarthy, Alaska); (90.5 MHz) KXGA (Glennallen, Alaska)

Links
- Public license information: Public file; LMS
- Webcast: Listen live
- Website: kchu.org

KCHU (770 kHz) is a non-commercial radio station in Valdez, Alaska. Through its main transmitter, two full-service FM stations, and four translators, the station covers an area the size of the state of Ohio, but with a population just over 10,000.

== Overview ==
KCHU airs a range of public radio programming from the National Public Radio and Public Radio Exchange networks, including Morning Edition, All Things Considered, The World, Democracy Now, Fresh Air, American Routes, Beale Street, and World Cafe. It also broadcasts local and state news and public affairs programs, as well as music programs hosted by community volunteers.

KCHU broadcast at 770 AM for nearly 40 years. In 2025, after experiencing ground erosion that threatened its main tower, the station moved to 91.3 FM with the installation of a new tower and transmitter. KCHU is repeated on KXKM 89.7 FM in McCarthy and KXGA 90.5 FM in Glennallen. It is also relayed by four low-power translators to widen its broadcasting area.

== Original KCHU, 1975-77 ==
The KCHU callsign was assigned earlier to a community radio station licensed to Dallas, Texas in the mid-late 1970s. The station was started by Dennis Gross and Lorenzo Milam, who had previously worked together at a pioneer community station, KDNA, in St. Louis. KCHU signed on at 90.9 FM on September 1, 1975, broadcasting an eclectic mix of music and public affairs programs. Beleaguered by debt and political infighting, the station signed off exactly two years later.

== KCHU Television ==
The KCHU call letters were originally used on a television station licensed to San Bernardino, in Southern California, which operated on channel 18 from March 6, 1962, until June 25, 1964.

== Stations ==
In addition to its main frequency, KCHU broadcasts on the following repeater and translator stations:

=== Full-power repeater stations ===
Call sign	Frequency	City of license	FID	ERP (W)	HAAT	Class	FCC info
KXGA	(90.5 FM) FM	Glennallen, Alaska	65235	3,200	229 m (751 ft)	C3	LMS
KXKM	(89.7 FM) FM	McCarthy, Alaska	65236	180 watts horizontal	−378 m (−1,240 ft)	A	LMS

=== Translator stations ===
Call sign	Frequency	City of license	FID	ERP (W)	Class	FCC info
K201BI	88.1 FM	Cordova, Alaska	65233	23 horizontal	D	LMS
K201CH	88.1 FM	Chenega Bay, Alaska	65234	21 vertical	D	LMS
K201CL	88.1 FM	Tatitlek, Alaska	65237	23 vertical	D	LMS
K202BT	88.3 FM	Whittier, Alaska	65231	50 vertical	D	LMS
