= KGLP =

- Gallup, New Mexico; United States
- Frequency: 91.7 MHz
- Branding: Gallup Public Radio

Programming
- Format: Public Radio
- Affiliations: NPR; Pacifica radio

Ownership
- Owner: Gallup Public Radio

History
- First air date: 1991
- Call sign meaning: "Gallup"

Technical information
- Licensing authority: FCC
- Facility ID: 23052
- Class: C3
- ERP: 880 watts
- HAAT: 349.6 meters (1147 feet)
- Transmitter coordinates: 35°36′13″N 108°40′45″W

Links
- Public license information: Public file; LMS
- Website: kglp.org

KGLP (91.7 FM) is a National Public Radio-affiliated radio station in Gallup, New Mexico. The station's programming includes a mix of local shows and National Public Radio programming. The station broadcasts from the University of New Mexico branch campus in Gallup.

The station was assigned the KGLP call letters by the Federal Communications Commission on June 14, 1991.

== See also ==
- List of community radio stations in the United States
