= WPRL =

Coordinates: 31.894°N 91.148°W

- Lorman, Mississippi; United States
- Frequency: 91.7 MHz (HD Radio)

Programming
- Format: Public radio
- Affiliations: National Public Radio

Ownership
- Owner: Alcorn State University

Technical information
- Licensing authority: FCC
- Class: A
- ERP: 3,000 watts
- HAAT: 91 meters

Links
- Public license information: Public file; LMS
- Website: https://www.wprl.org

WPRL (91.7 FM), is a National Public Radio-affiliated station in Lorman, Mississippi. It primarily features National Public Radio programming, jazz, and gospel music.
