= Public Radio East =

NPR member network for eastern North Carolina

- New Bern, North Carolina; United States
- Broadcast area: New Bern, Greenville, Jacksonville
- Branding: PRE News and Ideas; PRE Classical

Programming
- Format: News/talk; classical music
- Affiliations: NPR

Ownership
- Owner: Craven Community College

History
- First air date: June 4, 1984

Links
- Webcast: Listen live
- Website: publicradioeast.org
- For technical information, see § Transmitters.

Public Radio East is the NPR member regional network for northeastern North Carolina. It is a service of Craven Community College in New Bern, with studios in Barker Hall on the college's campus on College Court.

The network's original station, WTEB in New Bern, was launched June 4, 1984, on the frequency 89.5, at 66 kW. Its call sign contains the initials of Thurman Elwood Brock, Craven Community College's founding president. Later the station moved to 89.3 and increased power to 100 kW. The station has won many awards, including outstanding news operation from the Associated Press. During the 1990s, it added two full-time stations--WKNS Kinston at 90.3 and WBJD Atlantic Beach (serving Morehead City) at 91.5. It also added a low-powered translator in Greenville at 88.1, W201AO; now W210CF at 89.9 MHz, the translator is officially a repeater of WTEB.

Originally, all four stations aired a mix of NPR programming and classical music. In 2003, however, the network split into two separate services. The original NPR/classical format stayed on WTEB, while the other stations joined with newly signed-on WZNB at 88.5 in New Bern to become the News and Ideas Network, airing an expanded schedule of news and talk programming from NPR and other outlets. However, the two services simulcast most of NPR's more popular shows, such as Morning Edition and All Things Considered.

On February 5, 2018 the News and Ideas programming moved to WTEB, while WZNB, WKNS, WBJD and W201AO switched to classical as “PRE Classical”.

== Transmitters ==
Public Radio East transmitters
Call sign	Frequency	City of license	Facility ID	ERP (W)	HAAT	Class	Transmitter coordinates	Founded
WTEB	89.3 FM	New Bern, NC	14356	100,000	147 m (482 ft)	C1	35°06′32″N 77°06′10″W	June 4, 1984
WZNB	88.5 FM	New Bern, NC	94050	300	37 m (121 ft)	A	35°06′32″N 77°06′10″W	2003
W210CF	89.9 FM	Greenville, NC	14355	170	0 m (0 ft)	D	35°35′36″N 77°22′49″W	—
WKNS	90.3 FM	Kinston, NC	14358	35,000	98 m (322 ft)	C2	35°25′01″N 77°48′57″W	
WBJD	91.5 FM	Atlantic Beach, NC	14357	85,000	117 m (384 ft)	C1	34°45′34″N 76°51′16″W	
