= KNNB =

- Whiteriver, Arizona; United States
- Frequency: 88.1 MHz

Programming
- Format: Variety / Public radio
- Affiliations: National Public Radio; Native Voice One

Ownership
- Owner: Apache Radio Broadcasting Corporation

Technical information
- Licensing authority: FCC
- Class: A
- ERP: 630 Watts
- HAAT: 183 meters (601 feet)
- Transmitter coordinates: 33°45′47″N 109°57′39″W

Links
- Public license information: Public file; LMS
- Webcast: Listen Live
- Website: KNNB website

KNNB (88.1 FM) is a public radio station in Whiteriver, Arizona. It primarily features local programming for the White Mountain Apache Tribe community, plus networked programming from National Public Radio and Native Voice One.
