= KTXK =

Public radio station in Texarkana, Texas

- Texarkana, Texas; United States
- Frequency: 91.5 MHz

Programming
- Format: Public Radio
- Affiliations: National Public Radio

Ownership
- Owner: Texarkana College

History
- First air date: February 1, 1984
- Call sign meaning: TeXarKana

Technical information
- Licensing authority: FCC
- Class: C1
- ERP: 100,000 watts
- HAAT: 93 meters
- Transmitter coordinates: 33°23′33.00″N 94°14′44.00″W

Links
- Public license information: Public file; LMS
- Website: http://www.ktxk.org/

KTXK (91.5 FM) is a radio station broadcasting a public radio format. Licensed to Texarkana, Texas, United States, it serves the Texarkana area. The station is owned by Texarkana College and features programming from National Public Radio.

The station first broadcast on February 1, 1984. Originally, its signal didn't make it too far out of the Texarkana area. However, in 2003, it boosted its power from 5,000 watts to 100,000 watts, more than tripling its coverage area.

Steve Mitchell is the general manager and was the driving creative force behind the station from the time it went on the air. On air voices include Mitchell (underwriter spots and midday news block), Junius Stone (Morning Edition local and regional content and movie reviews), Pat Miller (All Things Considered local and regional announcer), Sabrina McCormick (news director), Alton Pettigrew (weekend announcer) and Frank Miller (music director).
