= WURC =

Coordinates: 34.781°N 89.447°W

- Holly Springs, Mississippi; United States
- Frequency: 88.1 (MHz)
- Branding: WURC-FM 88.1, Rust College Public Radio

Programming
- Format: Public radio
- Affiliations: National Public Radio

Ownership
- Owner: Rust College

History
- Call sign meaning: WU Rust College

Technical information
- Licensing authority: FCC
- Facility ID: 58271
- Class: A
- ERP: 3,000 watts
- HAAT: 83 meters (272 ft)

Links
- Public license information: Public file; LMS

WURC (88.1 FM), is a National Public Radio member station in Holly Springs, Mississippi, United States, owned and operated by Rust College.
