= KGOU =

Public radio station at the University of Oklahoma in Norman–Oklahoma City, Oklahoma

Coordinates: 35.2895°N 97.3586°W

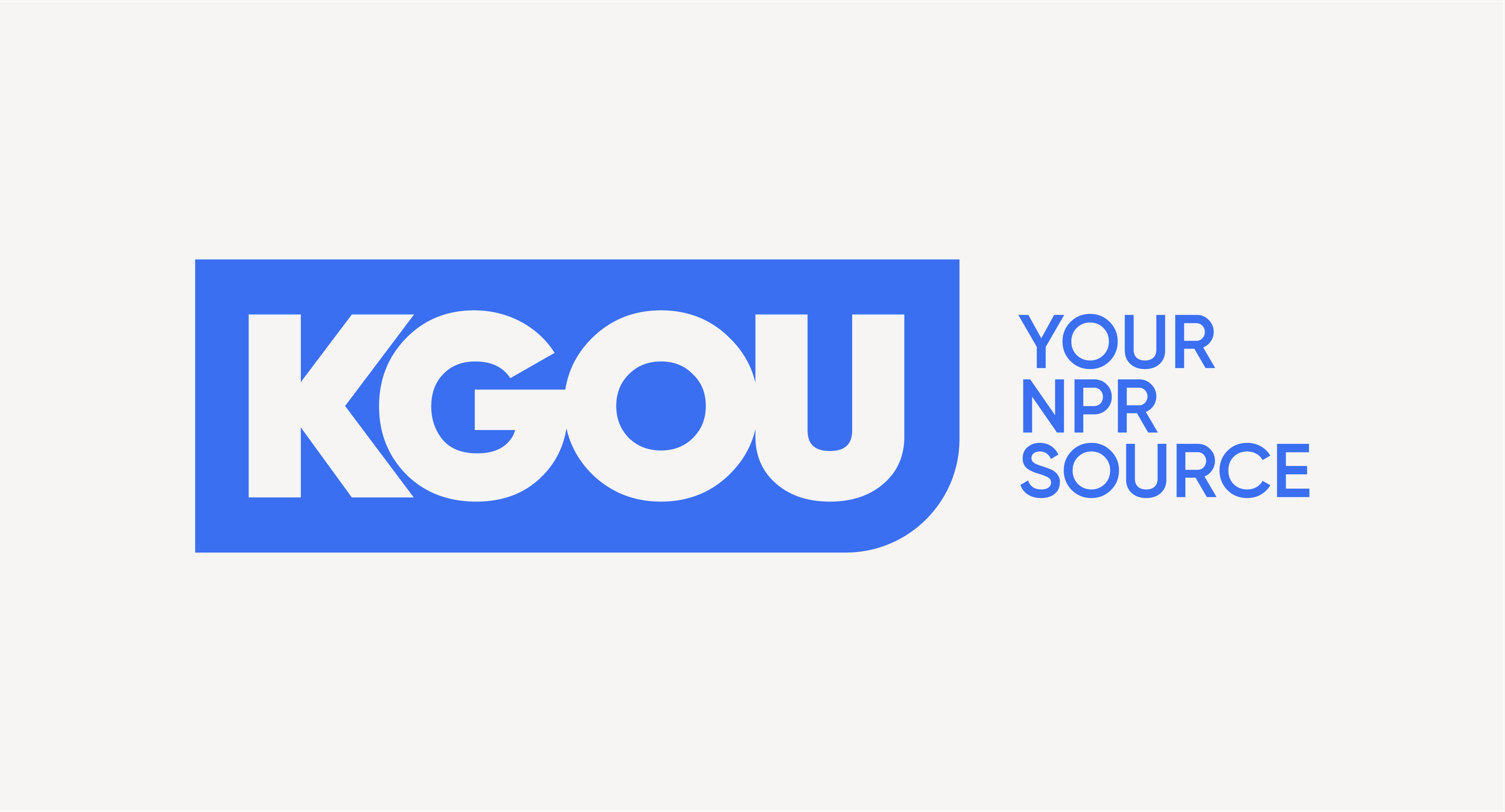
- Norman, Oklahoma; United States
- Broadcast area: Oklahoma City Metroplex
- Frequency: 106.3 MHz
- Branding: KGOU

Programming
- Format: Public radio/talk/jazz
- Affiliations: National Public Radio; American Public Media; Public Radio International; WFMT Jazz Network; BBC World Service

Ownership
- Owner: University of Oklahoma

History
- First air date: September 25, 1970
- Call sign meaning: OU is the abbreviation for the University of Oklahoma

Technical information
- Licensing authority: FCC
- Facility ID: 69369
- Class: A
- ERP: 6,000 watts
- HAAT: 88.7 meters (291 ft)

Links
- Public license information: Public file; LMS
- Webcast: Listen live
- Website: kgou.org

KGOU (106.3 MHz) is a non-commercial radio station licensed to Norman, Oklahoma, United States, serving the Oklahoma City Metroplex. It is owned by the University of Oklahoma, with the license held by the Board of Regents. It is operated by OU's College of Continuing Education (OU Outreach). Studios are in Copeland Hall on Van Vleet Oval, part of the OU campus. The staff consists of ten full-time and four part-time employees.

KGOU is a Class A FM station. It has an effective radiated power (ERP) of 6,000 watts. The transmitter is on East Indian Hills Road at 60th Avenue NE in Norman. Programming is also heard on four full-power satellites: KROU (105.7 FM) in Spencer, KWOU (88.1 FM) in Woodward, KOUA (91.9 FM) in Ada, and KQOU (89.1 FM) in Clinton. It also operates FM translators in Seminole (103.1 FM), in Ada (97.9 FM), in Chickasha (106.9 FM) and in Shawnee (105.1 FM).

== History ==
KGOU signed on the air on September 25, 1970. It was originally licensed as a commercial radio station. KGOU had a progressive rock format and sold advertisements, even though it was owned by the University of Oklahoma, a non-profit organization. The tower was atop Walker Dormitory. The station was an affiliate of the ABC FM Radio Network.

In the early 1980s, OU decided to use KGOU as a public radio station and discontinue the rock music and commercial ads. The university applied to the FCC for a non-commercial license. The station's new public radio format, featuring news and talk, took effect on New Year's Day, 1983. The studios were originally located in Kaufman Hall on the OU campus.

KGOU's main signal operates at 6,000 watts, which is fairly modest for a full NPR member station on the FM band. By contrast, Oklahoma State University's public radio station, 91.7 KOSU Stillwater, is powered at 100,000 watts and can also be heard in Oklahoma City. Soon after joining NPR, OU sought a license for a repeater station that would better cover Oklahoma City's northern suburbs. This station, 105.7 KROU, officially signed on the air on June 28, 1993. This means listeners in the suburbs south of Oklahoma City can tune in 106.3 KGOU while those north of Oklahoma City can listen to 105.7 KROU. KROU was the first in a network of eight repeater stations and translators that cover much of central and western Oklahoma.

KGOU renovated space in Copeland Hall on the OU campus in 2006. It moved its studios and offices to Copeland Hall that fall.

A rebroadcaster in Clinton was added in December 2017. Cameron University transferred the license for a station at 89.1 FM to KGOU ownership. The move expanded KGOU's listener base to 32 counties, nearly all in central, western and east-central Oklahoma. The new call sign for the Clinton transmitter is KQOU. It has an ERP of 40,000 watts, the most powerful station in KGOU's network.

== Programming ==
KGOU is a National Public Radio (NPR) member station. On weekdays, KGOU has a news and information format with programming from NPR and other public radio networks. They include Morning Edition, All Things Considered, Fresh Air, 1A, Here and Now and Marketplace. Evenings feature jazz music from the WFMT Chicago Jazz Network. The BBC World Service runs overnight.

== Repeaters ==
Call sign	Frequency	City of license	Facility ID	ERP (W)	Height (m (ft))	Class	FCC info
KOUA	91.9 FM	Ada	173673	1,500	81.9	A	FCC (KOUA)
KQOU	89.1 FM	Clinton	122436	40,000	193	C1	FCC (KQOU)
KROU	105.7 FM	Spencer	69175	1,600	194.6	A	FCC (KROU)
KWOU	88.1 FM	Woodward	172867	23,500	224.1	C1	FCC (KWOU)

=== Translators ===
Broadcast translators for KGOU
Call sign	Frequency	City of license	FID	ERP (W)	HAAT	Class	FCC info
K250AU	97.9 FM	Ada, Oklahoma	141599	250	29.9 m (98 ft)	D	LMS
K295BL	106.9 FM	Chickasha, Oklahoma	141689	250	28.5 m (94 ft)	D	LMS
K276ET	103.1 FM	Seminole, Oklahoma	141580	250	59.9 m (197 ft)	D	LMS
K286BZ	105.1 FM	Shawnee, Oklahoma	141589	140	117 m (384 ft)	D	LMS
