= WSNC =

Coordinates: 36.090°N 80.222°W

- Winston-Salem, North Carolina; United States
- Broadcast area: Piedmont Triad
- Frequency: 90.5 MHz
- Branding: 90.5 WSNC

Programming
- Format: Jazz
- Affiliations: NPR, PRI

Ownership
- Owner: Winston-Salem State University

History
- First air date: May 2, 1983
- Call sign meaning: Winston-Salem, North Carolina

Technical information
- Licensing authority: FCC
- Class: C3
- ERP: 10,000 watts

Links
- Public license information: Public file; LMS
- Website: Website

WSNC (90.5 FM) is a radio station broadcasting jazz, gospel, and talk programming. Licensed to Winston-Salem, North Carolina, United States, it serves the Piedmont Triad area. The station is currently owned by Winston-Salem State University. The founding General Manager of WSNC FM was Dr. Clarence W. Thomas.

In November 2017, WSNC replaced a transmitter installed in the 1990s which failed in June, causing the station to operate at a tenth of normal power using rented equipment for several months.

== See also ==
- List of jazz radio stations in the United States
