= KRPS (FM) =

Public radio station in Pittsburg, Kansas

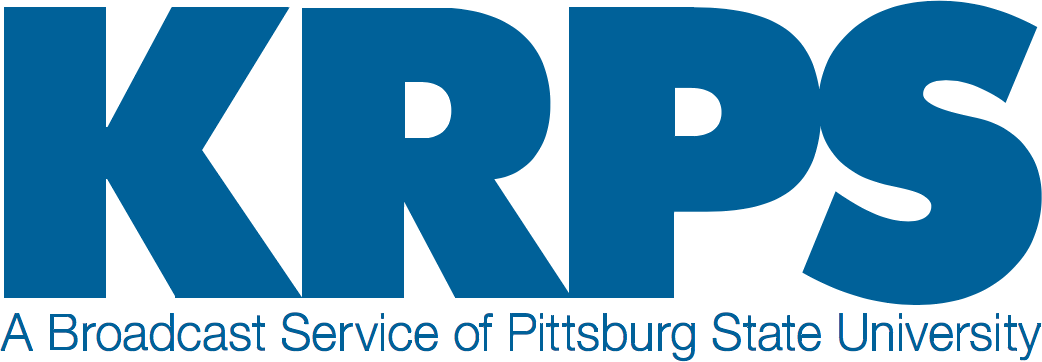
- Pittsburg, Kansas; United States
- Broadcast area: Four State Area
- Frequency: 89.9 MHz (HD Radio)
- Branding: KRPS 89.9

Programming
- Format: Public radio; News/talk
- Subchannels: HD2: Classical music HD3: BBC World Service
- Affiliations: NPR, Public Radio International

Ownership
- Owner: Pittsburg State University

History
- First air date: 1984 (as KJWR)
- Former call signs: KJWR (1984–1988)
- Call sign meaning: Radio Pittsburg State

Technical information
- Licensing authority: FCC
- Facility ID: 52740
- Class: C
- ERP: 100,000 watts
- HAAT: 305 meters (1,001 ft)
- Transmitter coordinates: 37°18′44.00″N 94°48′58.00″W
- Translator: 102.7 K274AJ (Bartlesville, Oklahoma)

Links
- Public license information: Public file; LMS
- Webcast: Listen live
- Website: krps.org

KRPS (89.9 MHz) is the National Public Radio member FM station for the Four State Area in the United States. It is licensed to Pittsburg, Kansas, and owned by Pittsburg State University. Studios are located inside the Baxter Broadcasting Center of Shirk Hall on the PSU campus on South Joplin Street, while the transmitter is located at the intersection of K-103 and Northeast 10th Street in Scammon, Kansas, two miles west of Weir. The station airs news and talk programming from NPR, Public Radio International, American Public Media and the BBC World Service. It is one of the few NPR stations to be the primary member for two markets—Pittsburg and Joplin, Missouri (though they are a single television market). KRPS is the smallest full NPR member in Kansas.

KRPS operates a translator at 102.7 in Bartlesville, Oklahoma, which is in the Tulsa market. This is mainly because the main NPR member in Tulsa, KWGS, has a weak signal in the Bartlesville area.

== History ==
Before KRPS signed on, the only source of NPR programming in the area was a translator of KSMU in Joplin. In 1977, just after Pittsburg State gained university status, the Department of Speech and Theater proposed to build a 10-watt station, but it was rejected by the Kansas Board of Regents due to a U.S. Federal Communications Commission freeze on new 10-watt applications. Later in 1977, Pittsburg State and the University of Kansas proposed to jointly operate a public radio station, but that proposal died due to a failure to meet Corporation for Public Broadcasting requirements for public funding.

When Donald W. Wilson became president in 1983, he launched a concerted effort to build a public radio station for one of the few areas of the country without public radio. In 1984, when KU announced plans to build a network of repeaters for its NPR station, KANU, the initial plan called for repeaters in Pittsburg and Joplin. Wilson supported this plan, but it collapsed for want of funding. Wilson then renewed efforts for Pittsburg State to support a station of its own. After a two-year fundraising effort, Pittsburg State decided to buy KJWR, a small 380-watt educational station in Weir and operated by the Weir Public Broadcasting Foundation since 1984. The license was transferred on September 4, 1987, and the call letters changed to KRPS. It would have been KPSU, but those calls were already in use by the student radio station at Oklahoma Panhandle State University.

The station was set to go on the air on April 29, 1988. However, it looked like that goal would not be met after rain moved into the area in early April. After KU loaned an antenna, KRPS signed on for the first time at 4 pm on April 29.

KRPS began streaming live on the Internet in mid-2018. It was one of the few full NPR members not to offer live streaming.

On January 15, 2024, KRPS dropped classical and jazz and switched to public radio news/talk.

== Translators ==
Broadcast translator for KRPS
Call sign	Frequency	City of license	FID	ERP (W)	HAAT	Class	FCC info
K274AJ	102.7 FM	Bartlesville, Oklahoma	52742	250	16 m (52 ft)	D	LMS
