= KEDM =

Public radio station in Monroe, Louisiana

- Monroe, Louisiana; United States
- Broadcast area: Monroe, Louisiana
- Frequency: 90.3 MHz (HD Radio)
- Branding: 90.3 KEDM Public Radio

Programming
- Language: English
- Format: Public radio
- Affiliations: National Public Radio, American Public Media

Ownership
- Owner: University of Louisiana at Monroe
- Sister stations: KXUL

History
- First air date: April 23, 1991
- Call sign meaning: "Education Monroe"

Technical information
- Licensing authority: FCC
- Facility ID: 49406
- Class: C1
- ERP: 100,000 watts
- HAAT: 261 meters (856 ft)
- Transmitter coordinates: 32°39′38″N 91°59′28″W

Links
- Public license information: Public file; LMS
- Website: kedm.org

KEDM (90.3 MHz, "90.3 KEDM Public Radio") is the listener-supported public radio station for Monroe, West Monroe, and all or parts of eleven parishes of northeast Louisiana and four counties in southeast Arkansas. It is owned by the University of Louisiana at Monroe.

The station broadcasts a lineup of in-depth NPR news; classical, roots and a variety of other musical genres; and special entertainment and other programs.

== History ==
KEDM signed on April 23, 1991. It began broadcasting in HD Radio on its 18th birthday, April 23, 2009, becoming the first station to do so in the region; its HD2 subchannel was KEDM Ideas, a 24-hour news and information subchannel.

KEDM features a regional nighttime format called The Boot. It showcases Louisiana and local artists and highlights music from the delta.
