= KTBR =

- Roseburg, Oregon; United States
- Frequency: 950 kHz (HD Radio)
- Branding: Jefferson Public Radio

Programming
- Format: news/talk; public radio
- Affiliations: American Public Media; National Public Radio; Public Radio Exchange

Ownership
- Owner: Southern Oregon University

History
- First air date: November 1955
- Former call signs: KYES (1955-1986); KRSB (1986-1987)

Technical information
- Licensing authority: FCC
- Facility ID: 33247
- Class: D
- Power: 3,400 watts (day); 20 watts (night)
- Transmitter coordinates: 43°10′08″N 123°22′28″W
- Translator: 96.3 K242DD (Roseburg)

Links
- Public license information: Public file; LMS
- Website: www.ijpr.org

KTBR (950 AM) is a radio station licensed to Roseburg, Oregon, owned by Southern Oregon University. KTBR is an affiliate of Jefferson Public Radio, airing JPR's news/talk "News & Information" service.
