= KPVU =

Radio station at Prairie View A&M University in Prairie View, Texas

- Prairie View, Texas; United States
- Broadcast area: Greater Houston
- Frequency: 91.3 MHz
- Branding: KPVU 91.3 FM

Programming
- Language: English
- Format: Public radio
- Affiliations: Compass Media Networks; NPR

Ownership
- Owner: Prairie View A&M University

History
- First air date: February 22, 1982
- Call sign meaning: Prairie View A&M University

Technical information
- Licensing authority: FCC
- Facility ID: 53347
- Class: C3
- ERP: 31,000 watts
- HAAT: 128 meters (420 ft)
- Transmitter coordinates: 30°5′21″N 95°59′46″W

Links
- Public license information: Public file; LMS
- Website: kpvu.org/radio

KPVU (91.3 FM) is a college radio station located on the campus of Prairie View A&M University in Prairie View, Texas, 25 miles northwest of Houston's city limits. Owned and operated by Prairie View A&M, KPVU's studios are located on campus inside Suite 130 of the Hilliard Hall Communications Center on Cleaver Street, and its transmitter is located near Panther Stadium, also on campus on Stadium Drive.

The station's playlist mainly consists of jazz, but at other times it plays Urban AC-level R&B and Gospel as well.

The signal is a rimshot over the northwestern portions of the Greater Houston area, fringing out over parts of the city.
