= KRZA =

- Alamosa, Colorado; United States
- Frequency: 88.7 MHz

Programming
- Format: Public radio; Variety
- Affiliations: American Public Media; NPR; Pacifica radio; PRX

Ownership
- Owner: Equal Representation of Media Advocacy Corp.

Technical information
- Licensing authority: FCC
- Facility ID: 19660
- Class: C1
- ERP: 9,800 watts
- HAAT: 628.0 meters (2,060.4 ft)
- Transmitter coordinates: 36°51′37″N 106°0′25″W

Links
- Public license information: Public file; LMS
- Website: www.krza.org

KRZA (88.7 FM) is a community radio station in Alamosa, Colorado. It primarily features National Public Radio programming, though its schedule also includes local news and a range of music programs during the afternoons, at night, and on weekends.

As of early 2025, KRZA received nearly half of its funding from the federal government via the Corporation for Public Broadcasting.

== See also ==
- List of community radio stations in the United States
