= KUHB-FM =

Coordinates: 57.121°N 170.281°W

- St. Paul, Alaska; United States
- Broadcast area: St. Paul Island, Alaska
- Frequencies: 91.9 MHz (HD Radio)
- Branding: 91.9 KUHB

Programming
- Format: Public Radio
- Affiliations: NPR, BBC World Service

Ownership
- Owner: Pribilof School District Board Of Education

History
- First air date: 1984

Technical information
- Licensing authority: FCC
- Facility ID: 53494
- Class: A
- ERP: 250 watts
- HAAT: 32 meters (105 ft)

Links
- Public license information: Public file; LMS
- Webcast: KUHB Webstream
- Website: kuhbradio.com

KUHB-FM is a non-commercial radio station in St. Paul, Alaska, broadcasting on 91.9 FM. The station airs public radio programming from the National Public Radio network and the BBC World Service. KUHB also airs some locally originated programming.

KUHB carries daily news programming from KMXT in Kodiak and from the Alaska Public Radio Network. KUHB also airs Pacifica's Democracy Now program in the mornings.

== See also ==
- List of community radio stations in the United States
