= KACU =

Public radio station in Abilene, Texas

Coordinates: 32.476°N 99.706°W

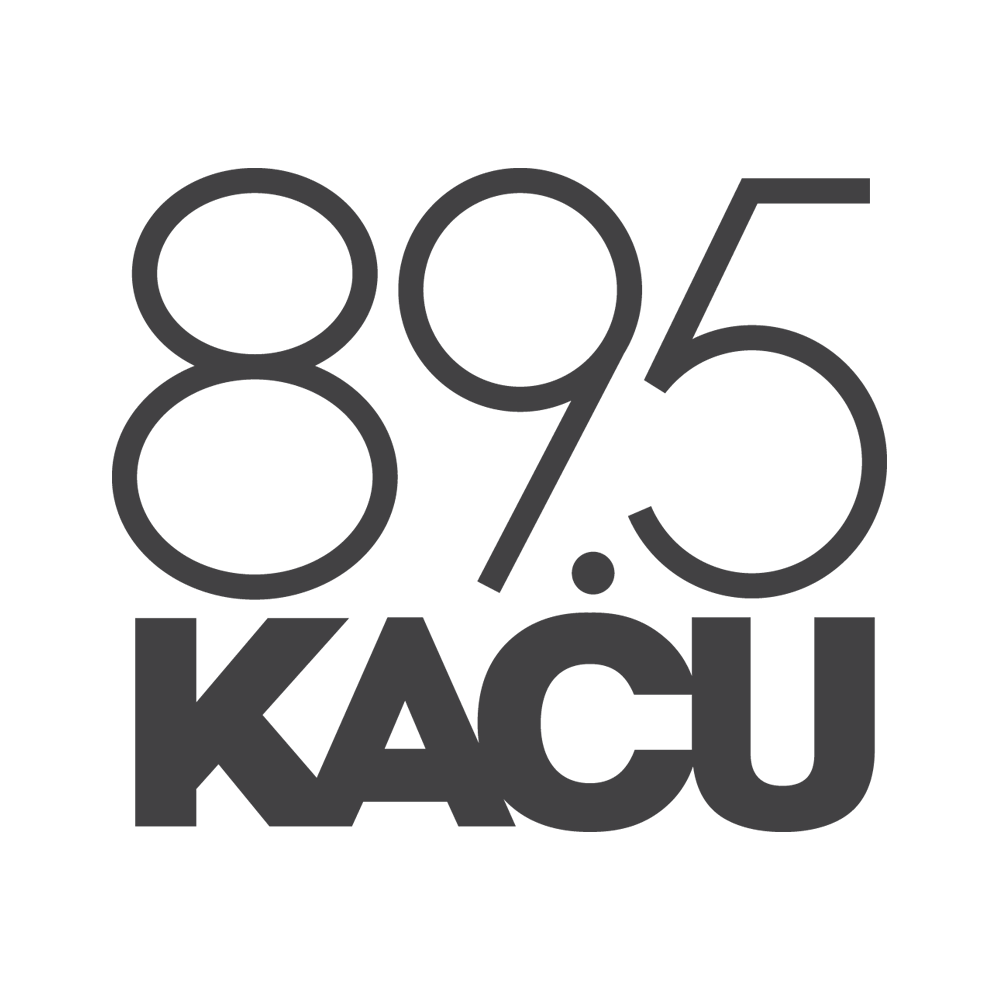

Abilene, Texas; United States
- Broadcast area: West Texas
- Frequency: 89.5 MHz (HD Radio)
- Branding: KACU 89.5, Abilene Public Radio

Programming
- Format: Public radio
- Affiliations: NPR

Ownership
- Owner: Abilene Christian University

History
- First air date: June 2, 1986
- Former frequencies: 89.7 MHz (1986–2015)
- Call sign meaning: Abilene Christian University

Technical information
- Licensing authority: FCC
- Class: C1
- ERP: 100,000 watts
- HAAT: 189 meters

Links
- Public license information: Public file; LMS
- Website: http://www.kacu.org

KACU is an FM public radio station that serves the Abilene, Texas, area. The station is owned by Abilene Christian University, and its students make up the on-air staff and news team. KACU is an NPR affiliate station, and it is the only public radio station in Abilene as well as the only station that broadcasts in high definition.
