= WVPG =

- Parkersburg, West Virginia; United States
- Broadcast area: Parkersburg, West Virginia; Marietta, Ohio
- Frequency: 90.3 MHz
- Branding: West Virginia Public Broadcasting

Programming
- Format: Public radio
- Affiliations: American Public Media; National Public Radio; Public Radio International

Ownership
- Owner: West Virginia Educational Broadcasting Authority
- Sister stations: WVBL, WVBY, WVDS, WVEP, WVNP, WVPM, WVPB, WVPW, WVWS, WVWV

History
- First air date: April 4, 1985
- Call sign meaning: West Virginia Parkersburg

Technical information
- Licensing authority: FCC
- Facility ID: 70642
- Class: B1
- ERP: 9,000 watts
- HAAT: 98 meters (322 ft)
- Transmitter coordinates: 39°12′44.0″N 81°35′30.0″W

Links
- Public license information: Public file; LMS
- Webcast: WVPG Webstream
- Website: WVPG Online

WVPG is a public radio formatted broadcast radio station licensed to Bluefield, West Virginia, serving Parkersburg in West Virginia and Marietta in Ohio. WVPG is owned and operated by West Virginia Educational Broadcasting Authority.
