= Valley Public Radio =

KVPR and KPRX
KVPR: Fresno, California; KPRX: Bakersfield, California; United States
- Broadcast area: San Joaquin Valley
- Frequencies: KVPR: 89.3 MHz (HD Radio); KPRX: 89.1 MHz (HD Radio)
- Branding: KVPR

Programming
- Format: NPR and classical music
- Subchannels: HD2: Classical music

Ownership
- Owner: White Ash Broadcasting, Inc.

History
- First air date: KVPR: October 15, 1978; KPRX: February 1987
- Call sign meaning: KVPR: Valley Public Radio; KPRX: Public Radio

Technical information
- Licensing authority: FCC
- Facility ID: KVPR: 72188; KPRX: 72186
- Class: KVPR: B; KPRX: B1
- ERP: KVPR: 2,450 watts; KPRX: 11,000 watts
- HAAT: KVPR: 576 meters (1,890 ft); KPRX: 152 m (499 ft)
- Transmitter coordinates: KVPR: 37°4′25″N 119°25′52″W; KPRX: 35°29′10″N 118°53′20″W

Links
- Public license information: KVPR: Public file; LMS; KPRX: Public file; LMS
- Webcast: Listen Live; Listen Live (HD2)
- Website: kvpr.org

Valley Public Radio (VPR) now branded as KVPR is a public radio organization in Fresno, California, broadcasting programming from National Public Radio (NPR) and other public radio producers and distributors, as well as locally produced news, music, talk, and public affairs programs. Valley Public Radio consists of two FM stations–KVPR in Fresno (89.3 MHz) and satellite station KPRX in Bakersfield (89.1 MHz).

Despite having no translators, the two stations' combined signal covers most of California's San Joaquin Valley, including the cities of Fresno, Bakersfield, Visalia, Madera, Tulare, Clovis, Merced, and Hanford; however, much of this area gets only grade B coverage.

The two stations operate at somewhat modest power for full NPR members on the FM band. KPRX operates with its maximum allowed U.S. Federal Communications Commission power (11,000 watts) for a Class B1 station with an antenna height of 152 meters; likewise KVPR broadcasts with its maximum allowed power (2,450 watts) and an antenna height of 576 meters for a Class B FM station. In FM broadcasting effective radiated power is inversely proportional to antenna height.

== History ==
In 1975, Richard Mays, Von Johnson and Randall (Jan) van Oosten formed White Ash Broadcasting in order to bring a public radio station to the Central Valley.

Initial operating funds for White Ash Broadcasting came from a 'seed' grant of $25,000 provided through a competitive grant award from the Corporation for Public Broadcasting (CPB). In 1976, the U.S. Department of Health, Education and Welfare awarded White Ash Broadcasting a "matching grant" of $125,000 to cover the cost of studio and transmission equipment. To earn the full grant award, the program required White Ash to raise $40,000 from local sources.

White Ash Broadcasting successfully petitioned the FCC for a construction permit in the fall of 1976, and received a full license two years later. KVPR's first broadcast plant was located at 1515 Van Ness Avenue at the site of the former KMJ-AM/FM studios in the historic Fresno Bee Building. KVPR began regular broadcast services on October 15, 1978 and to newer facilities Shaw Avenue in the mid 1980s. In May 2015, KVPR broke ground on a new studio in the Research & Technology Park in Clovis and has occupied the space since 2017.

Valley Public Radio's initial programming mix was music, news and public affairs. Nearly 75% of KVPR's original program schedule was locally produced, and included portions of jazz, folk and classical music in addition to select programming from National Public Radio. Over time, KVPR would opt to focus on a combination of mostly NPR programming and classical music.

KPRX signed on in February 1987 as a full satellite of KVPR, replacing a low-power translator that had served the Bakersfield area since 1982. Bakersfield had previously been one of the largest cities in the country with no NPR stations.

On November 17, 2021, Valley Public Radio rebranded as KVPR to prevent branding confusion with Vermont Public Radio.
