= KOOZ =

Coordinates: 42.959°N 124.274°W

- Myrtle Point, Oregon; United States
- Frequencies: 94.1 MHz (HD Radio)
- Branding: Jefferson Public Radio

Programming
- Format: Public radio; news, classical music
- Affiliations: National Public Radio; American Public Media; Public Radio Exchange

Ownership
- Owner: Southern Oregon University

Technical information
- Licensing authority: FCC
- Facility ID: 33248
- Class: C1
- ERP: 9,000 watts
- HAAT: 451 meters (1,480 ft)

Links
- Public license information: Public file; LMS
- Webcast: Listen live
- Website: www.ijpr.org

KOOZ (94.1 FM) is a radio station licensed to Myrtle Point, Oregon. The station is owned by Southern Oregon University, and is an affiliate of Jefferson Public Radio, airing JPR's "Classics & News" service, consisting of news and classical music programming.
