= List of Minnesota Public Radio affiliates =

List of radio stations operated by Minnesota Public Radio

Minnesota Public Radio (MPR) operates three radio services: MPR News, YourClassical MPR, and The Current. It operates full-power stations and FM translators serving Minnesota and neighboring communities.

In the tables below, gray indicates a service flagship and blue indicates an FM translator. HD Radio subchannels are not classified as FM translators. Establishment years are based on MPR station histories; a dash (—) indicates that a year has not been verified.

== MPR News ==
Call sign	Frequency	Market	State	Established
KNOW	91.1 FM	Minneapolis–Saint Paul	MN	1979
K280EB	103.9 FM	Albert Lea	MN	—
KNCM	91.3 FM	Appleton	MN	1997
KNSE	90.1 FM	Austin	MN	—
KNBJ	91.3 FM	Bemidji	MN	1994
K270AQ	101.9 FM	Blue Earth	MN	—
KBPN	88.3 FM	Brainerd	MN	2003
K286AU	105.1 FM	Brownton–Glencoe	MN	—
WSCN	100.5 FM	Duluth–Superior	MN	1988
WIRC	89.3 FM	Ely	MN	2011
W256BC	99.1 FM	Eveleth	MN	—
KCCD	90.3 FM	Fargo–Moorhead	MN	1992
KNWF	91.5 FM	Fergus Falls	MN	2003
WLSN	89.7 FM	Grand Marais	MN	2001
KGRP	89.7 FM	Grand Rapids	MN	2013
WINH	91.9 FM	Hinckley	MN	2013
KITF	88.3 FM	International Falls	MN	—
KXLC	91.1 FM	La Crescent–La Crosse	MN	—
KNGA	90.5 FM	Mankato–Saint Peter	MN	1985
K276EW	103.1 FM	Olivia	MN	—
K280EC	103.9 FM	Owatonna	MN	—
KRFI	88.1 FM	Redwood Falls	MN	—
KZSE	91.7 FM	Rochester	MN	—
KNSR	88.9 FM	Saint Cloud–Collegeville	MN	1988
KNTN	102.7 FM	Thief River Falls–Grand Forks	MN	1991
WIRN	92.5 FM	Virginia–Hibbing	MN	—
KRXW	103.5 FM	Warroad–Roseau	MN	2008
K246BG	97.1 FM	Windom	MN	—
K270AB	101.9 FM	Winona	MN	—
KNSW	91.7 FM	Worthington–Marshall	MN	1973
KLNI	88.7 FM	Decorah	IA	1993
K242BW	96.3 FM	Decorah	IA	—
WGGL	91.1 FM	Houghton	MI	1982
KAUR	89.1 FM	Sioux Falls	SD	—

== YourClassical MPR ==
Call sign	Frequency	Market	State	Established
KSJN	99.5 FM	Minneapolis–Saint Paul	MN	1967
K224DM	92.7 FM	Albert Lea	MN	—
KSJR	89.7 FM	Alexandria	MN	1967
KRSU	88.5 FM	Appleton	MN	1989
KCRB	88.5 FM	Bemidji	MN	1982
K222BA	92.3 FM	Blue Earth	MN	—
KBPR	90.7 FM	Brainerd	MN	1988
KCMF	89.7 FM	Fergus Falls	MN	2003
WMLS	88.7 FM	Grand Marais	MN	2001
KCRB	88.5 FM	Grand Rapids	MN	1982
K281AB	104.1 FM	Grand Rapids	MN	—
K206EF	89.1 FM	Granite Falls–Montevideo	MN	—
WGRH	88.5 FM	Hinckley	MN	2010
W226AY	93.1 FM	Hinckley	MN	—
WIRR	90.9 FM	Eveleth–Virginia–Hibbing	MN	1985
KCCM	91.1 FM	Fargo–Moorhead	MN	1971
KITF	88.3 FM	International Falls	MN	—
KGAC	91.5 FM	Mankato–Saint Peter	MN	1992
K280ET	103.9 FM	Olivia	MN	—
K289AE	105.7 FM	Owatonna	MN	—
KLSE	90.7 FM	Rochester	MN	—
KNSR	88.9 FM	Saint Cloud–Collegeville	MN	—
K295BD	106.9 FM	Saint James	MN	—
K276EV	103.1 FM	Sleepy Eye	MN	—
KQMN	91.5 FM	Thief River Falls–Grand Forks	MN	1990
KRXW HD2	100.7 FM	Warroad–Roseau	MN	—
W297AW	107.3 FM	Winona	MN	—
KRSW	89.3 FM	Worthington–Marshall	MN	1994
KLCD	89.5 FM	Decorah	IA	1977
WGGL	91.1 FM	Houghton	MI	1982
K238AX	95.5 FM	Brookings	SD	—
KRSD	88.1 FM	Sioux Falls	SD	1985

== The Current ==
Call sign	Frequency	Market	State	Established
KCMP	89.3 FM	Minneapolis–Saint Paul	MN	2005
K280EF	103.9 FM	Austin	MN	—
K280EF	103.9 FM	Austin	MN	—
KZIO	104.3 FM	Duluth–Superior	MN	—
K231B1	94.1 FM	Duluth	MN	—
W267BV	101.3 FM	Ely	MN	—
K297AD	107.3 FM	Grand Rapids	MN	—
W248AS	97.5 FM	Hinckley	MN	—
K237EX	95.3 FM	Mankato	MN	—
K286AW	105.1 FM	Mankato	MN	—
K237ET	95.3 FM	New Ulm	MN	—
K231AT	94.1 FM	Pine City	MN	—
KMSE	88.7 FM	Rochester	MN	—
K228XN	93.5 FM	Saint Peter	MN	—
