= WUIS =

NPR member station in Springfield, Illinois

- Springfield, Illinois; United States
- Frequency: 91.9 MHz (HD Radio)
- Branding: NPR Illinois

Programming
- Format: Public radio
- Subchannels: HD2: Classical "NPR Illinois Classic"; HD3: AAA "The X"
- Affiliations: National Public Radio

Ownership
- Owner: University of Illinois Springfield; (Board of Trustees of the University of Illinois)

History
- First air date: January 3, 1975 (as WSSR)
- Former call signs: WSSR (1975–1989); WSSU (1989–1995)
- Call sign meaning: University of Illinois Springfield

Technical information
- Licensing authority: FCC
- Facility ID: 59012
- Class: B (NCE)
- ERP: 50,000 watts
- HAAT: 152 meters (499 ft)
- Transmitter coordinates: 39°47′0.2″N 89°26′46.3″W
- Repeater: 89.3 WIPA (Pittsfield)

Links
- Public license information: Public file; LMS
- Webcast: Listen live; HD2: Listen live; HD3: Listen live
- Website: www.nprillinois.org

WUIS (91.9 FM), branded on-air as NPR Illinois, is the National Public Radio member station in Springfield, Illinois, United States. It primarily features National Public Radio news and talk programming. The station is owned by and based at the WUIS Building on the campus of the University of Illinois Springfield on Theodore Dreiser Lane. It operates a full-time satellite, WIPA (89.3 FM) in Pittsfield, which serves a small portion of the Quincy market.

== History ==
WUIS originally hit the airwaves on January 3, 1975, as WSSR, operated by what was then Sangamon State University. It became WSSU in 1989, and WUIS when Sangamon State merged with the University of Illinois system in 1995.

WIPA was brought online in 1993.

In 2015, the station rebranded as "NPR Illinois".
