= KISU-FM =

Radio station at Idaho State University in Pocatello, Idaho

- Pocatello, Idaho; United States
- Broadcast area: Pocatello, Idaho
- Frequency: 91.1 MHz

Programming
- Format: Public radio
- Affiliations: NPR

Ownership
- Owner: Idaho State University

History
- First air date: June 4, 1999

Technical information
- Licensing authority: FCC
- Facility ID: 85417
- Class: C2
- ERP: 4,500 watts
- HAAT: 318 meters (1,043 ft)
- Transmitter coordinates: 42°51′46″N 112°31′03″W

Links
- Public license information: Public file; LMS
- Webcast: Listen live
- Website: kisu.org

KISU-FM (91.1 FM), is a National Public Radio member station in Pocatello, Idaho, owned by Idaho State University. KISU-FM originally went on the air June 4, 1999; and since the spring of 2000 has carried student hosted content. The first such student hosted show was In House with Jeremy Peterson. Since then KISU-FM has added more than a half dozen student hosted shows to its repertoire. Current General Manager is Jamon Anderson.
