= KENW-FM =

Public radio station at Eastern New Mexico University

Coordinates: 34.252°N 103.240°W

- Portales, New Mexico; United States
- Frequency: 89.5 MHz

Programming
- Format: Public radio
- Affiliations: National Public Radio

Ownership
- Owner: Eastern New Mexico University
- Sister stations: KENW (TV)

History
- First air date: 1979
- Call sign meaning: Eastern New (Mexico)

Technical information
- Licensing authority: FCC
- Facility ID: 18344
- Class: C1
- ERP: 100,000 watts
- HAAT: 180 meters (590 ft)
- Repeaters: See table

Links
- Public license information: Public file; LMS
- Website: kenw.org

KENW-FM (89.5 FM) is a radio station broadcasting a public radio format. Licensed to Portales, New Mexico, United States, the station is currently owned by Eastern New Mexico University.

== Translators ==
In addition to the main station, KENW-FM is simulcasted on 9 full powered stations and 10 low-powered translators to widen its broadcast area.

=== Full powered stations ===
Call sign	Frequency	City of license	FID	ERP (W)	HAAT	FCC info
KENE	88.1 FM	Raton, NM	174721	1,250	431 m (1,414 ft)	LMS
KENG	88.5 FM	Ruidoso, NM	174172	71	921 m (3,022 ft)	LMS
KENM	88.9 FM	Tucumcari, NM	174720	3,000	265 m (869 ft)	LMS
KMTH	98.7 FM	Maljamar, NM	4279	100,000	216 m (709 ft)	LMS
KENU	88.5 FM	Des Moines, NM	174722	240	613 m (2,011 ft)	LMS
KNMJ	100.9 FM	Eunice, NM	40206	50,000	111 m (364 ft)	LMS
KENP	88.1 FM	Las Vegas, NM	768910	700	−2 m (−7 ft)	LMS
KENB	90.9 FM	Roswell, NM	767230	4,000	28 m (92 ft)	LMS
KENY	90.5 FM	Wagon Mound, NM	768269	200	468 m (1,535 ft)	LMS

=== Low-powered translators ===
Call sign	Frequency	City of license	FID	FCC info
K228DP	93.5 FM	Clayton, NM	18351	LMS
K291AD	106.1 FM	Des Moines, NM	18349	LMS
K219DP	91.7 FM	Fort Sumner, NM	90376	LMS
K201IW	88.1 FM	Las Vegas, NM	76186	LMS
K216BJ	91.1 FM	Roswell, NM	55507	LMS
K215DT	90.9 FM	San Augustin, NM	18345	LMS
K221DM	92.1 FM	Wagon Mound, NM	18343	LMS
