= List of California State University radio stations =

The following is a list of California State University online and FCC-licensed radio stations.

- Coyote Radio (California State University – San Bernardino) student-run online radio station
- Dolphin Radio (California State University – Channel Islands) official student-run online radio station
- KAZU (California State University – Monterey Bay)
- KCHO (FM) (California State University – Chico)
- KCPK (California State Polytechnic University, Pomona, CA) FM, then carrier-current AM for dorms in late 1960s to 1970s.
- KCPP (California Poly University – Pomona) online radio station student club
- KCR (San Diego State University)
- KCPR (Cal Poly at San Luis Obispo)
- KCSN (California State University – Northridge)
- KCSS (California State University Stanislaus)
- KFSR (California State University – Fresno)
- KKJZ (California State University – Long Beach)
  - 22 West Radio (formerly K-Beach Radio) (California State University – Long Beach) Student Union run, online radio station
- KHSM (Cal Poly Humboldt)
- KHSQ (Cal Poly Humboldt)
- KHSU (Cal Poly Humboldt)
- KPBS-FM (San Diego State University)
- KRFH-LP (Cal Poly Humboldt)
- KSFS (San Francisco State University)
- KSJS (San Jose State University)
- KSSU (AM) (California State University – Sacramento)
- KXJZ (California State University – Sacramento)
- KXPR (California State University – Sacramento)
- KUOP (California State University – Sacramento)
