= Lisa Dickey =

American author

Lisa Dickey, a native of Pensacola, Florida, is an American author and ghostwriter. Since 1997, she has worked on more than 20 nonfiction books, in fields ranging from technology to politics to Hollywood memoirs, including ten New York Times bestsellers. In January 2017, St. Martin's Press published her first non-collaborative book, Bears in the Streets: Three Journeys Across a Changing Russia.

== Career ==
Dickey began her writing career in 1994 in St. Petersburg, Russia, where she wrote for The St. Petersburg Press, The Moscow Times, and Russian Life. In 1995, she and photographer Gary Matoso spent three months traveling across Russia, posting photos and stories to The Russian Chronicles, an early Web travelogue.

In 2005, Dickey recreated the 1995 trip with photographer David Hillegas, again traveling across Russia to track down the people she and Matoso had met and report on how their lives had changed. That project – The Russian Chronicles: Ten Years Later – ran for eleven weeks on the Washingtonpost.com website.

Dickey began her ghostwriting / book doctor career in 1997, when she assisted then-Washington Post reporter Kara Swisher in completing her book AOL.COM. Her book clients have included First Lady Jill Biden, U.S. Senator Tammy Duckworth, gospel singer Cissy Houston, California Lt. Governor Gavin Newsom, Whitewater figure Susan McDougal, former Hearst Magazines president Cathie Black, and actor Patrick Swayze.

== Personal life ==
In 2010, Dickey married screenwriter Randi Barnes. They live in Los Angeles.

== Bibliography ==
- AOL.COM: How Steve Case Beat Bill Gates, Nailed the Netheads and Made Millions in the War for the Web, by Kara Swisher (Times Business Books, 1998).
- Confessions of a Venture Capitalist: Inside the High-Stakes World of Startup Financing, by Ruthann Quindlen (Warner, 2000).
- Wireless Nation: The Frenzied Launch of the Cellular Revolution in America, by James B. Murray, Jr. (Perseus Books, 2001).
- The Woman Who Wouldn’t Talk: Why I Refused to Testify Against the Clintons and What I Learned in Jail, by Susan McDougal and Pat Harris (Carroll & Graf, 2003).
- There Must Be a Pony in Here Somewhere: The AOL Time Warner Debacle and the Quest for a Digital Future, by Kara Swisher with Lisa Dickey (Crown Business, 2003).
- Barn Burning, Barn Building: Tales of a Political Life, from LBJ to George W. Bush and Beyond, by Ben Barnes with Lisa Dickey (Bright Sky, 2006).
- Basic Black: The Essential Guide for Getting Ahead at Work (And in Life), by Cathie Black (Crown Business, 2007)
- The Devil We Know: Dealing with the New Iranian Superpower, by Robert Baer (Crown, 2008)
- The Time of My Life, by Patrick Swayze and Lisa Niemi (Atria, 2009)
- The World is Bigger Now: An American Journalist’s Release from Captivity in North Korea, by Euna Lee with Lisa Dickey (Broadway, 2010)
- A Fistful of Rice: My Unexpected Quest to End Poverty Through Profitability, by Vikram Akula (Harvard Business Press, 2010)
- Happy Accidents, by Jane Lynch (Voice, 2011)
- Citizenville, by Gavin Newsom with Lisa Dickey (Penguin Group, 2013)
- Remembering Whitney, by Cissy Houston with Lisa Dickey (Harper Collins, 2013)
- Herbie Hancock: Possibilities, by Herbie Hancock with Lisa Dickey (Viking Adult, 2014)
- Bears in the Streets: Three Journeys across a Changing Russia (St. Martin's Press, 2017)
- The Right Answer: How We Can Unify Our Divided Nation, by John K. Delaney (Holt, 2018)
- Where the Light Enters, by Jill Biden (Flatiron, 2019)
- Every Day is a Gift, by Tammy Duckworth (Twelve, 2021)
- Walk Through Fire, by Sheila Johnson with Lisa Dickey (Simon & Schuster, 2023)
