= KFPR =

KFPR may refer to:

- The ICAO airport code for St. Lucie County International Airport
- KFPR (FM), a radio station (88.9 FM) licensed to Redding, California, United States
