= Gavin Newsom =

Governor of California since 2019

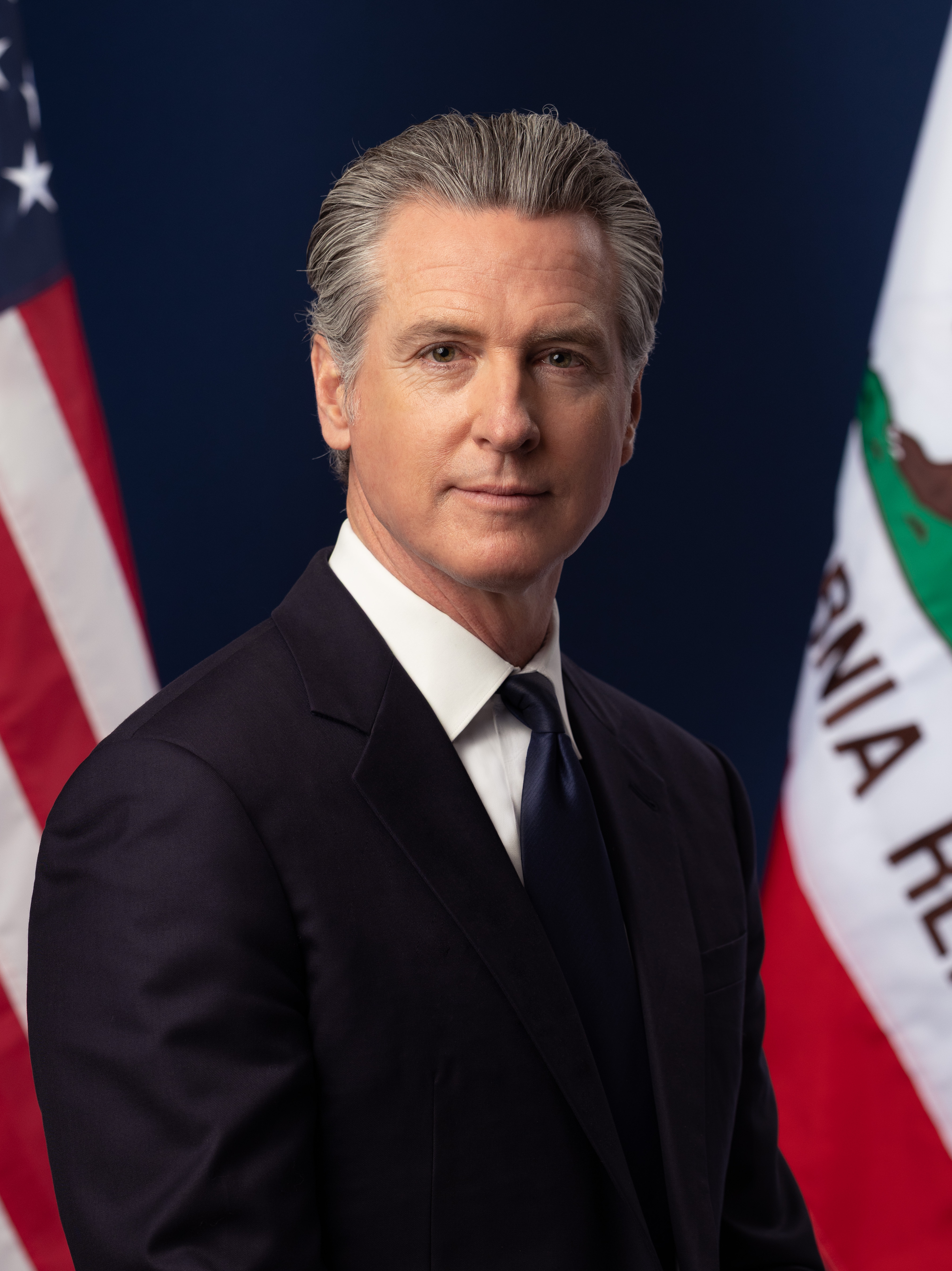
- Official portrait, 2026

40th Governor of California
- Incumbent
- Assumed office January 7, 2019
- Lieutenant: Eleni Kounalakis
- Preceded by: Jerry Brown

49th Lieutenant Governor of California
- In office January 10, 2011 – January 7, 2019
- Governor: Jerry Brown
- Preceded by: Abel Maldonado
- Succeeded by: Eleni Kounalakis

42nd Mayor of San Francisco
- In office January 8, 2004 – January 10, 2011
- Preceded by: Willie Brown
- Succeeded by: Ed Lee

Member of the San Francisco Board of Supervisors
- In office February 13, 1997 – January 8, 2004
- Preceded by: Kevin Shelley
- Succeeded by: Michela Alioto-Pier
- Constituency: At-large district (1997–2001); 2nd district (2001–2004)

Personal details
- Born: Gavin Christopher Newsom; October 10, 1967 (age 59) San Francisco, California, U.S.
- Party: Democratic
- Spouses: Kimberly Guilfoyle (m. 2001; div. 2006); Jennifer Siebel (m. 2008)
- Children: 4
- Parent: William Newsom (father)
- Relatives: Newsom family
- Education: Santa Clara University (BS)
- Website: Campaign website
- Newsom's voice Newsom on the war on drugs and its impact on society Recorded March 8, 2014

Gavin Christopher Newsom (Note: Pronounced /ˈnjuːsəm/ NEW-səm) (born October 10, 1967) is an American politician and businessman serving as the 40th governor of California since 2019. A member of the Democratic Party, he served as the 49th lieutenant governor of California from 2011 to 2019 and as the 42nd mayor of San Francisco from 2004 to 2011.

Born and raised in San Francisco, Newsom graduated from Santa Clara University in 1989 with a Bachelor of Science in political science. Afterward, he founded the boutique winery PlumpJack Group in Oakville, California, with billionaire heir and family friend Gordon Getty as an investor. The company grew to manage 23 businesses, including wineries, restaurants, and hotels. Newsom began his political career in 1996, when San Francisco mayor Willie Brown appointed him to the city's Parking and Traffic Commission. Brown then appointed Newsom to fill a vacancy on the Board of Supervisors the next year and Newsom was first elected to the board in 1998.

Newsom was elected mayor of San Francisco in 2003 and reelected in 2007. He was elected lieutenant governor of California in 2010 and reelected in 2014. As lieutenant governor, Newsom hosted The Gavin Newsom Show from 2012 to 2013 and in 2013 wrote the book Citizenville, which focuses on using digital tools for democratic change.

Newsom was elected governor in 2018 and reelected in 2022. He faced criticism for his personal behavior and leadership style during the COVID-19 pandemic, which contributed to an unsuccessful recall effort in 2021. As governor, Newsom has focused on infrastructure, housing, climate, gun control and LGBTQ rights. In 2025, he began hosting the podcast This Is Gavin Newsom, which has featured guests from across the political spectrum. He oversaw the passage of California Proposition 50, a gerrymandering proposal developed in response to 2025 Texas redistricting, and opposed Proposition 40, which would have imposed a one-time wealth tax on the state's billionaires. Newsom is a potential candidate in the 2028 United States presidential election.

== Early life and education ==
Gavin Christopher Newsom was born on October 10, 1967, in San Francisco, California, to Tessa Thomas (née Menzies) and William Alfred Newsom III, a state appeals court judge and attorney for Getty Oil. He is a descendant of the Newsom family of architects active in early 20th century California, who originally came from Canada. William Newsom was a close friend of billionaire heir Gordon Getty, who repeatedly supported Gavin's career. William Newsom would also for a time help manage the Getty Trust. A fourth-generation San Franciscan, Newsom comes from a prominent family. His maternal great-grandfather Thomas Addis was a nephrologist and professor of medicine at Stanford University noted for his research on kidney disease. Newsom is a second cousin twice removed of musician Joanna Newsom, and his aunt Barbara Newsom was married to Ron Pelosi, the brother-in-law of former House speaker Nancy Pelosi. Newsom's parents divorced in 1971 when he was three years old, leaving his mother, Tessa, to raise him and his younger sister, Hilary Newsom Callan, largely on her own. Tessa worked three jobs—often as a waitress, bookkeeper, and secretary—to support the family, and Newsom has cited her as shaping his work ethic. Newsom has called his childhood challenging, shaped in part by financial instability and his struggle with "pretty severe" dyslexia, a condition he still has.

Newsom's education began at École Notre Dame des Victoires, a French-American bilingual Catholic school in San Francisco that he attended for kindergarten and first grade. But his severe dyslexia—which affected his ability to read, write, spell, and perform numerical tasks—prompted a transfer. He continued at Notre Dame des Victoires from third through fifth grades, where he was enrolled in remedial reading classes to cope with his learning difficulties. Throughout his years in school, Newsom relied heavily on audiobooks, summaries, and verbal instruction. Newsom has written that as an adult, he still prefers audio interpretations of documents and reports. In a 2023 interview, he said his dyslexia "forced me to find workarounds and think differently."

At Redwood High School in Larkspur, California, Newsom excelled athletically despite his academic struggles, graduating in 1985. He played basketball as a shooting guard and baseball as an outfielder. Tessa opened their home to foster children. Newsom's sister Hilary recalled lean Christmases when their mother warned them not to expect gifts, underscoring the family's financial strain. Newsom wrote in a later memoir that the family would receive luxurious gifts from the Gettys, which he and his sister pretended not to like so their mother could return them for store credit. Nevertheless, the children also accompanied the Gettys on expensive trips, such as a hot-air balloon safari and a meeting with King Juan Carlos I of Spain. Newsom's father's habit of donating much of his income further tightened the family's finances, leading Newsom to take jobs such as washing cars and working at a local deli during high school.

Newsom enrolled at Santa Clara University on a partial baseball scholarship, graduating in 1989 with a Bachelor of Science in political science. His application to the university was supported by letters of recommendation from former California governor Jerry Brown and a member of the school's Board of Regents. He tried out for the baseball team during his first two years but underwent elbow surgery in late 1985—later revealed as a procedure to repair a torn ulnar collateral ligament—ending his varsity aspirations. He has credited the university's Jesuit education for influencing his worldview. During his junior year, Newsom spent a semester studying abroad in Rome, Italy, an experience he called "eye-opening" in a 2019 speech.

== Business career ==
Newsom and a group of investors created the company PlumpJack Associates L.P. on May 14, 1991. The group started the PlumpJack Winery in 1992 with the financial help of his family friend Gordon Getty. PlumpJack was the name of an opera written by Getty, who invested in 10 of Newsom's 11 businesses. Getty told the San Francisco Chronicle that he treated Newsom like a son and invested in his first business venture because of that relationship. According to Getty, later business investments were because of "the success of the first".

One of Newsom's early interactions with government occurred when Newsom resisted the San Francisco Department of Public Health's requirement to install a sink at his PlumpJack wine store. The Health Department argued that wine was a food and required the store to install a $2,700 sink in the carpeted wine shop on the grounds that the shop needed the sink for a mop. When Newsom was later appointed supervisor, he told the San Francisco Examiner: "That's the kind of bureaucratic malaise I'm going to be working through."

The business grew to an enterprise with more than 700 employees. The PlumpJack Cafe Partners L.P. opened the PlumpJack Café, also on Fillmore Street, in 1993. Between 1993 and 2000, Newsom and his investors opened several other businesses that included the PlumpJack Squaw Valley Inn with a PlumpJack Café (1994), a winery in Napa Valley (1995), the Balboa Café Bar and Grill (1995), the PlumpJack Development Fund L.P. (1996), the MatrixFillmore Bar (1998), PlumpJack Wines shop Noe Valley branch (1999), PlumpJackSport retail clothing (2000), and a second Balboa Café at Squaw Valley (2000). Newsom's investments included five restaurants and two retail clothing stores. Newsom's annual income was greater than $429,000 from 1996 to 2001. In 2002, his business holdings were valued at more than $6.9 million. Newsom gave a monthly $50 gift certificate to PlumpJack employees whose business ideas failed, because in his view, "There can be no success without failure."

Newsom sold his share of his San Francisco businesses when he became mayor in 2004. He maintained his ownership in the PlumpJack companies outside San Francisco, including the PlumpJack Winery in Oakville, California, new PlumpJack-owned Cade Winery in Angwin, California, and the PlumpJack Squaw Valley Inn. He is the president in absentia of Airelle Wines Inc., which is connected to the PlumpJack Winery in Napa County. Newsom earned between $141,000 and $251,000 in 2007 from his business interests. In February 2006, he paid $2,350,000 for his residence in the Russian Hill neighborhood, which he put on the market in April 2009 for $3,000,000. At the time of the Silicon Valley Bank collapse in March 2023, it was acknowledged that at least three of Newsom's wine companies—PlumpJack, Cade, and Odette—were Silicon Valley Bank clients.

== Early political career ==
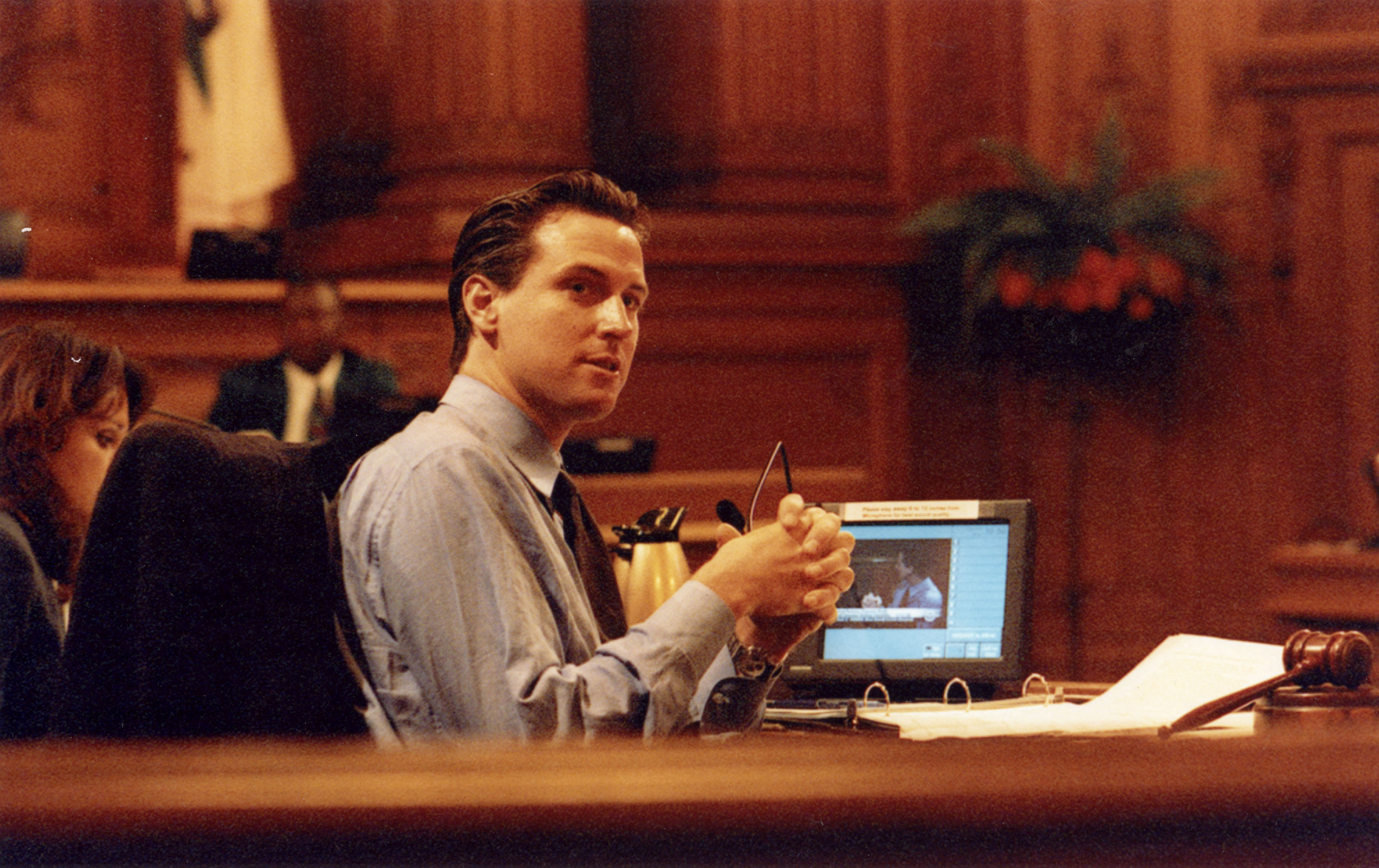
Newsom in 1999 as a San Francisco Supervisor

Newsom's first political experience came when he volunteered for Willie Brown's successful campaign for mayor in 1995. Newsom hosted a private fundraiser at his PlumpJack Café. Brown appointed Newsom to a vacant seat on the Parking and Traffic Commission in 1996, and he was later elected president of the commission. Brown appointed him to the San Francisco Board of Supervisors seat vacated by Kevin Shelley in 1997. At the time, he was the youngest member of San Francisco's board of supervisors.

Newsom was sworn in by his father and pledged to bring his business experience to the board. Brown called Newsom "part of the future generation of leaders of this great city". Newsom described himself as a "social liberal and a fiscal watchdog". He was elected to a full four-year term to the board in 1998. San Francisco voters chose to abandon at-large elections to the board for the previous district system in 1999. Newsom was reelected in 2000 and 2002 to represent the second district, which includes Pacific Heights, the Marina, Cow Hollow, Sea Cliff, and Laurel Heights, which had San Francisco's highest income level and highest Republican registration. Newsom paid $500 to the San Francisco Republican Party to appear on the party's endorsement slate in 2000 while running for Supervisor. He was reelected.

As a San Francisco Supervisor, Newsom gained public attention for his role in advocating reform of the city's municipal railway (Muni). He was one of two supervisors endorsed by Rescue Muni, a transit riders group, in his 1998 reelection. He sponsored Proposition B to require Muni and other city departments to develop detailed customer service plans. The measure passed with 56.6% of the vote. Newsom sponsored a ballot measure from Rescue Muni; a version of the measure was approved by voters in November 1999. Newsom also supported allowing restaurants to serve alcohol at their outdoor tables, banning tobacco advertisements visible from the streets, stiffer penalties for landlords who run afoul of rent-control laws, and a resolution, which was defeated, to commend Colin Powell for raising money for youth programs. Newsom's support for business interests at times strained his relationship with labor leaders.

During Newsom's time as supervisor, he supported housing projects through public-private partnerships to increase homeownership and affordable housing in San Francisco. He supported HOPE, a failed local-ballot measure that would have allowed an increased condo-conversion rate if a certain percentage of tenants within a building were buying their units. As a candidate for mayor, he supported building 10,000 new housing units to create 15,000 new construction jobs. Newsom's signature achievement as a supervisor was a voter initiative called Care Not Cash (Measure N), which offered care, supportive housing, drug treatment, and help from behavioral health specialists for the homeless in lieu of direct cash aid from the state's general assistance program. Many homeless rights advocates protested against the initiative. Newsom said: "Progressives and Democrats, nuns and priests, homeless advocates and homeless people were furious." The successfully passed ballot measure raised his political profile and provided the volunteers, donors, and campaign staff that helped make him a leading contender for mayor in 2003. In a 2008 city audit, the program was evaluated as largely successful for lowering average cash payments per person from over $300 to $78 and the number of people receiving cash payments from over 2,500 to about 640.

== Mayor of San Francisco (2004–2011) ==
=== Elections ===
==== 2003 ====
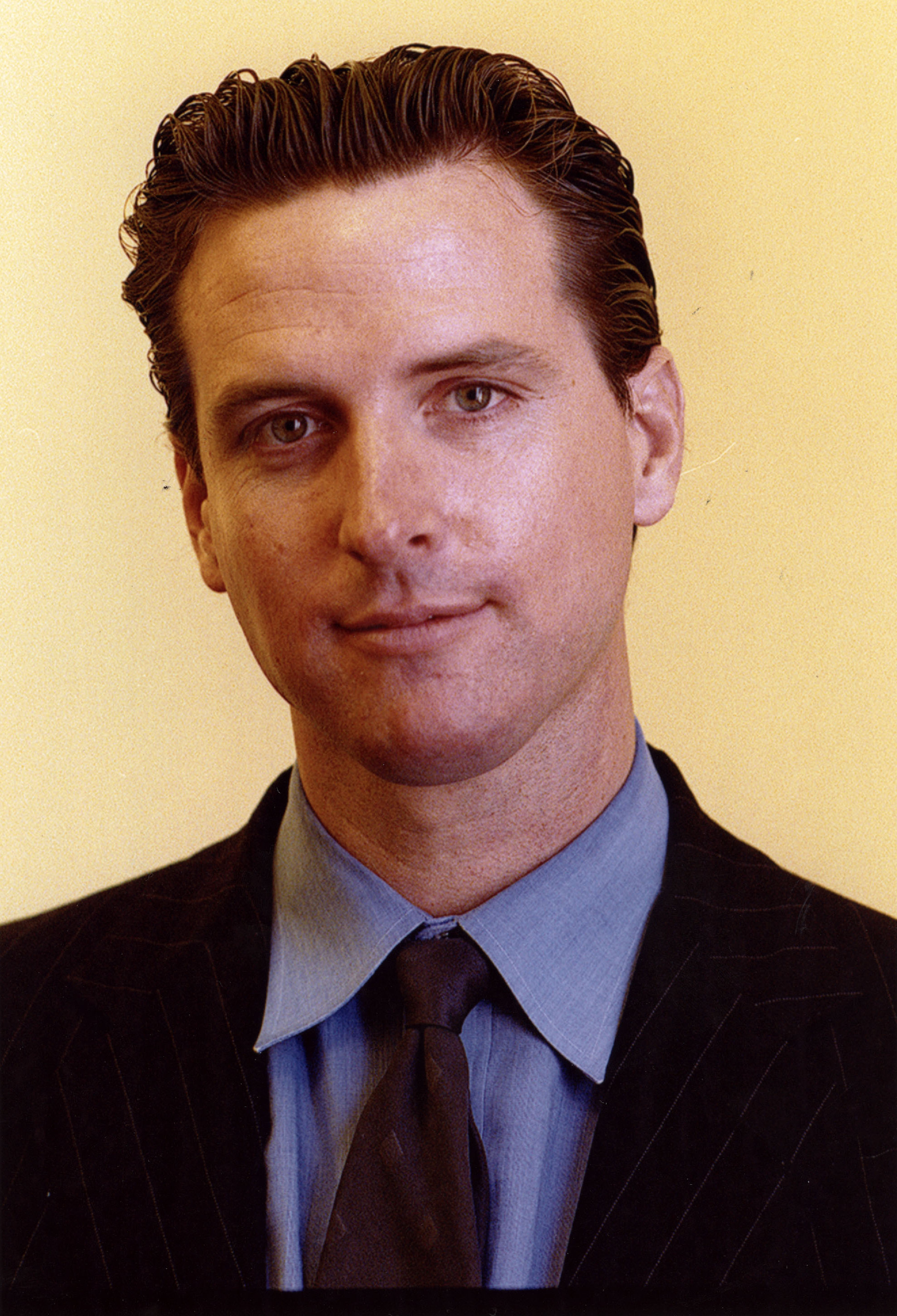
Newsom's portrait as a member of the SF Board of Supervisors, 1999

Newsom placed first in the November 4, 2003, general election in a nine-person field. He received 41.9% of the vote to Green Party candidate Matt Gonzalez's 19.6% in the first round of balloting, but faced a closer race in the December 9 runoff, when many of the city's progressive groups supported Gonzalez. The race was partisan, with attacks against Gonzalez for his support of Ralph Nader in the 2000 presidential election, and attacks against Newsom for contributing $500 to a Republican slate mailer in 2000 that endorsed issues Newsom supported. Democratic leaders felt that San Francisco needed to be reinforced as a Democratic stronghold after losing the 2000 presidential election and the 2003 gubernatorial recall election to Arnold Schwarzenegger. National Democratic Party figures, including Bill Clinton, Al Gore, and Jesse Jackson, campaigned for Newsom. Five supervisors endorsed Gonzalez, while Willie Brown endorsed Newsom.

Newsom won the runoff with 53% of the vote to Gonzalez's 47%, a margin of 11,000 votes. He ran as a business-friendly centrist Democrat and a moderate in San Francisco politics. Some of his opponents called him conservative. Newsom said he was a centrist in the Dianne Feinstein mold. He ran on the slogan "great cities, great ideas", and presented over 21 policy papers. He pledged to continue working on San Francisco's homelessness issue. Newsom was sworn in as mayor on January 8, 2004. He called for unity among the city's political factions, and promised to address the issues of public schools, potholes, and affordable housing. Newsom said he was "a different kind of leader" who "isn't afraid to solve even the toughest problems".

==== 2007 ====
San Francisco's progressive community tried to field a candidate to run against Newsom. Supervisors Ross Mirkarimi and Chris Daly considered running, but both declined. Gonzalez also decided not to challenge Newsom again. When the August 10, 2007, filing deadline passed, San Francisco's discussion shifted to talk about Newsom's second term. He was challenged in the election by 13 candidates, including George Davis, a nudist activist, and Michael Powers, owner of the Power Exchange sex club. Conservative former supervisor Tony Hall withdrew by early September due to lack of support. In August 2007, the San Francisco Chronicle wrote that Newsom faced no "serious threat to his re-election bid", having raised $1.6 million for his campaign by early August. He was reelected on November 6 with over 72% of the vote. Upon taking office for a second term, Newsom promised to focus on the environment, homelessness, health care, education, housing, and rebuilding San Francisco General Hospital.

=== Mayoralty ===
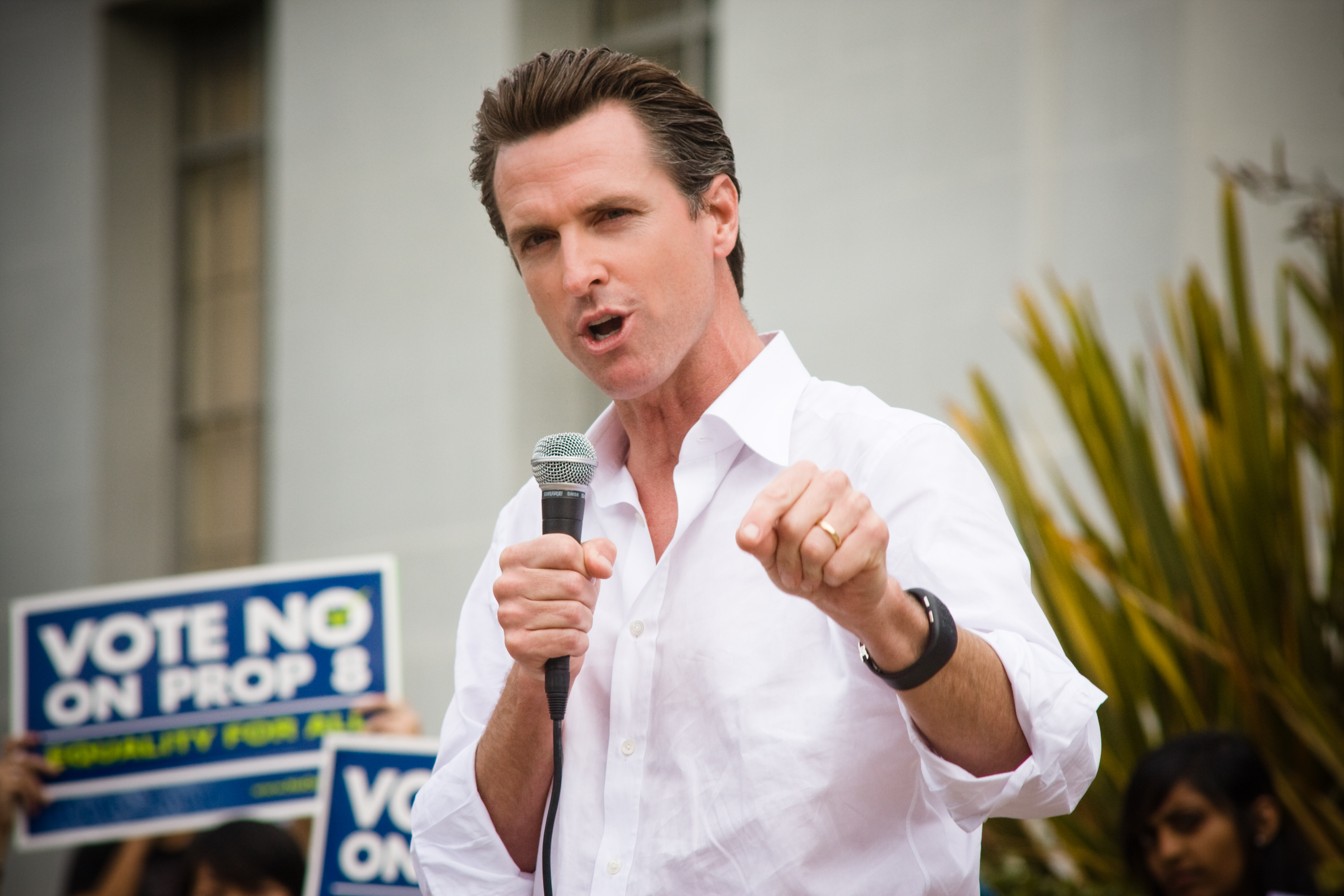
Newsom campaigning against Proposition 8 in 2008

As mayor, Newsom focused on development projects in Hunters Point and Treasure Island. He gained national attention in 2004 when he directed the San Francisco city–county clerk to issue marriage licenses to same-sex couples, violating a state law passed in 2000. Implementation of Care Not Cash, the initiative he had sponsored as a supervisor, began on July 1, 2004. As part of the initiative, 5,000 more homeless people were given permanent shelter in the city. About 2,000 people had been placed into permanent housing with support by 2007. Other programs Newsom initiated to end chronic homelessness included the San Francisco Homeless Outreach Team (SF HOT) and Project Homeless Connect (PHC), which placed 2,000 homeless people into permanent housing and provided 5,000 additional affordable rental units in the city.

During a strike by hotel workers against a dozen San Francisco hotels, Newsom joined UNITE HERE union members on a picket line in front of the Westin St. Francis Hotel on October 27, 2004. He vowed that the city would boycott the hotels by not sponsoring city events at them until they agreed to a contract with workers; the contract dispute was settled in September 2006. In 2005, Newsom pushed for a state law to allow California communities to create policy restricting certain breeds of dogs. In 2007, he signed the law establishing Healthy San Francisco to provide city residents with universal health care, the first city in the nation to do so. Newsom came under attack from the San Francisco Democratic Party in 2009 for his failure to implement the City of San Francisco's sanctuary city rule, under which the city was to not assist U.S. Immigration and Customs Enforcement.

The same year, Newsom received the Leadership for Healthy Communities Award, along with Mayor Michael Bloomberg of New York City and three other public officials, for his commitment to making healthful food and physical activity options more accessible to children and families. He hosted the Urban-Rural Roundtable in 2008 to explore ways to promote regional food development and increased access to healthy, affordable food. Newsom secured $8 million in federal and local funds for the Better Streets program, which ensures that public health perspectives are fully integrated into urban planning processes. He signed a menu-labeling bill into law, requiring that chain restaurants print nutrition information on their menus. Newsom was named "America's Most Social Mayor" in 2010 by Same Point, based on analysis of the social media profiles of mayors of the 100 largest U.S. cities.

=== Same-sex marriage ===
Newsom gained national attention in 2004 when he directed the San Francisco city–county clerk to issue marriage licenses to same-sex couples, violating state law. In August 2004, the Supreme Court of California annulled the marriages Newsom had authorized, as they conflicted with state law. Still, Newsom's unexpected move brought national attention to the issue of same-sex marriage, solidifying political support for him in San Francisco and in the LGBTQ+ community.

During the 2008 election, Newsom opposed Proposition 8, the ballot initiative to reverse the Supreme Court of California ruling that there was a constitutional right to same-sex marriage. Proposition 8 supporters released a commercial featuring footage of Newsom saying the following in a speech regarding same-sex marriage: "This door's wide open now. It's going to happen, whether you like it or not." Some observers noted that polls shifted in favor of Proposition 8 after the commercial's release; this, in turn, led to speculation that Newsom had inadvertently played a role in the amendment's passage.

== Lieutenant governor of California (2011–2019) ==
=== Elections ===
==== 2010 ====
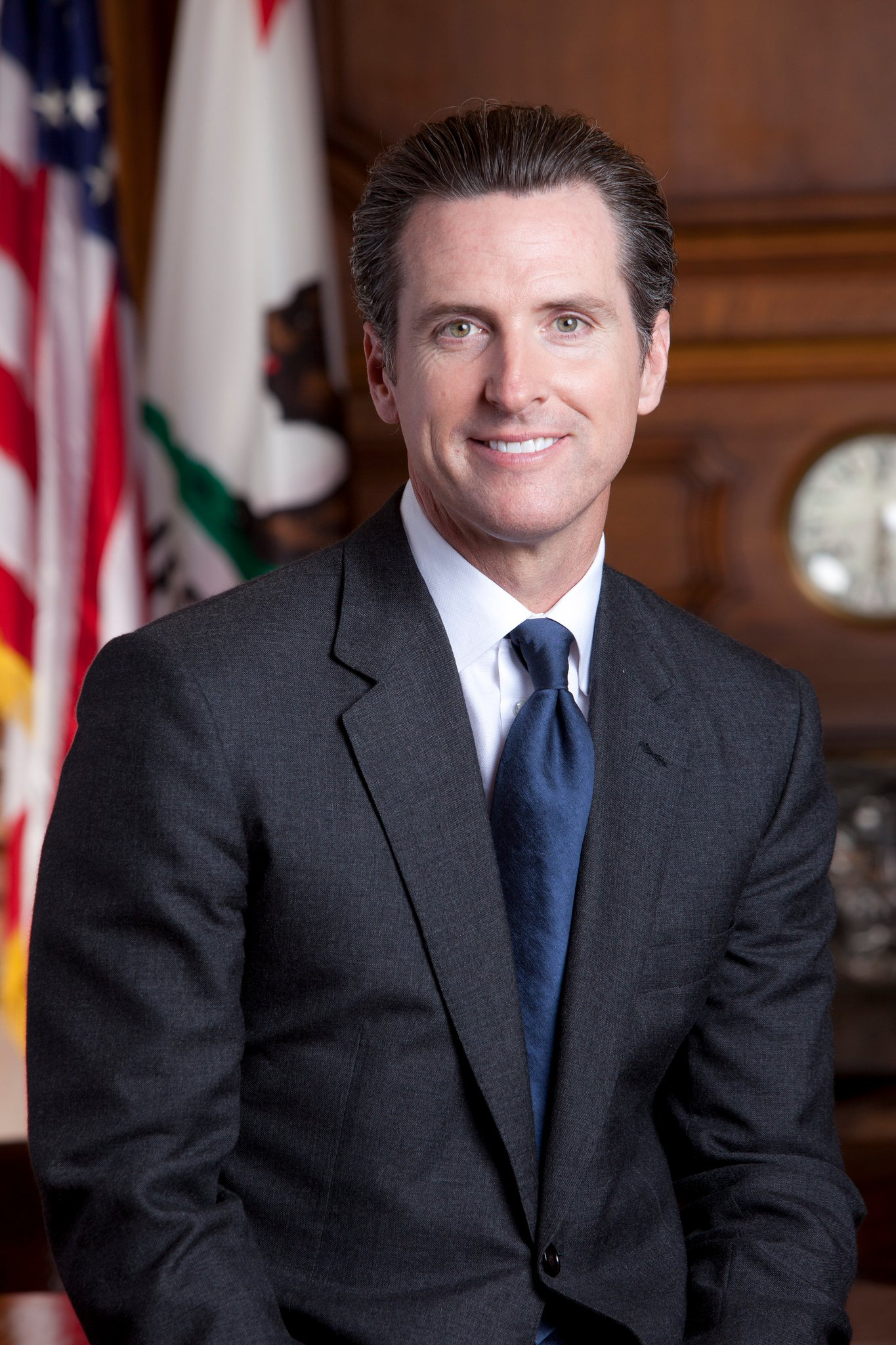
Newsom during his tenure as lieutenant governor of California

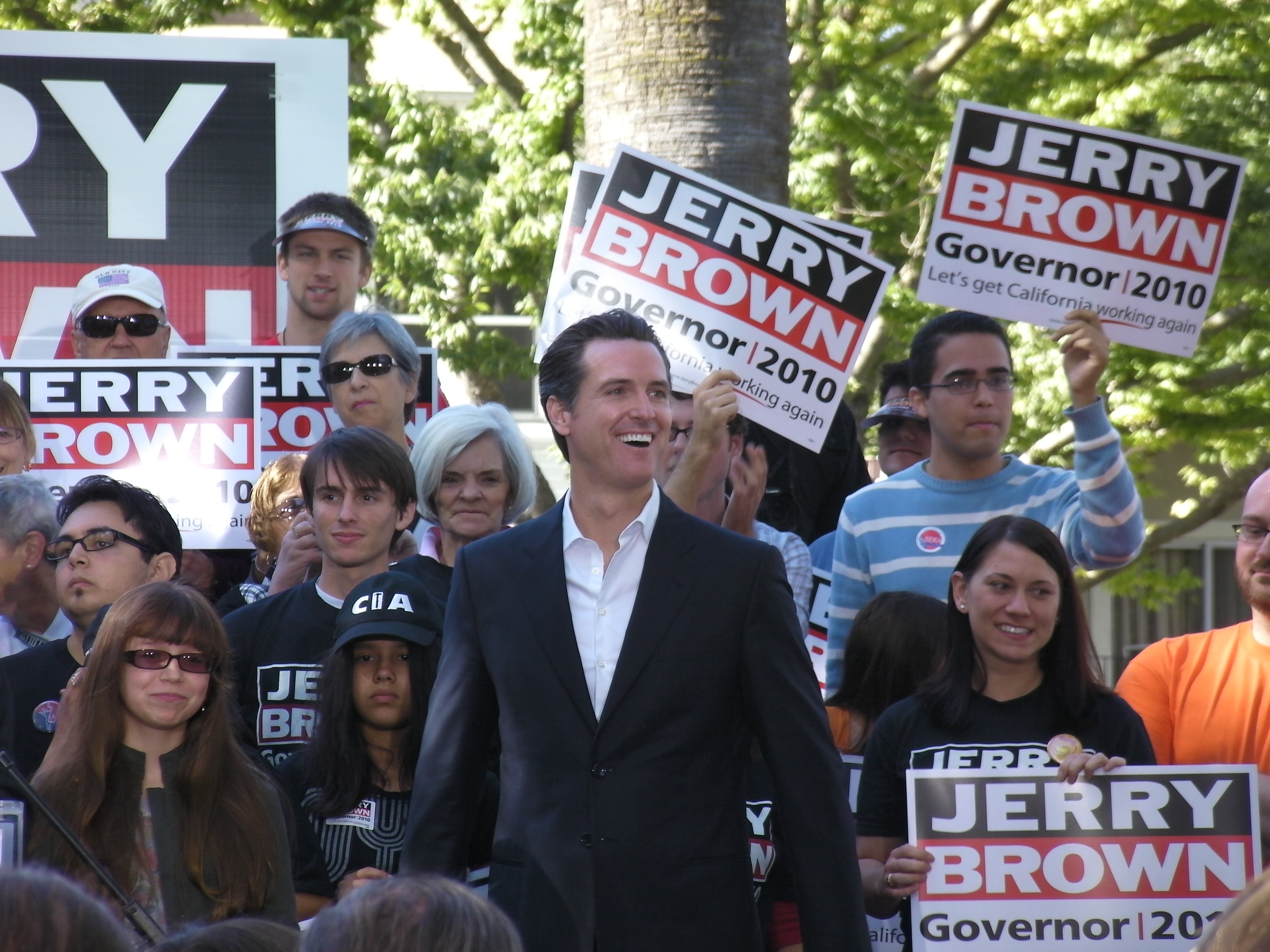
Newsom campaigns for Jerry Brown for governor, October 2010

Newsom filed initial paperwork to run for lieutenant governor in February 2010, and officially announced his candidacy in March. He received the Democratic nomination in June, and won the election on November 2. Newsom was sworn in as lieutenant governor on January 10, 2011, and served under Governor Jerry Brown. While lieutenant governor, in May 2012, Newsom began hosting The Gavin Newsom Show on Current TV. The same month, he drew criticism for calling Sacramento "dull" and saying he was only there once a week, adding, "there's no reason" to be there otherwise.

==== 2014 ====
Newsom was reelected as lieutenant governor on November 4, 2014, defeating Republican Ron Nehring with 57.2% of the vote. His second term began on January 5, 2015.

=== Capital punishment ===
Newsom supported a failed measure in 2012 that sought to end capital punishment in California. He said the initiative would save California millions of dollars, citing statistics that California had spent $5 billion since 1978 to execute just 13 people. In 2016, Newsom supported Proposition 62, which also would have repealed the death penalty in California. He argued that Prop. 62 would get rid of a system "that is administered with troubling racial disparities" and said that the death penalty was fundamentally immoral and did not deter crime. Proposition 62 failed.

=== Criminal justice and cannabis legalization ===
In 2014, Newsom was the only statewide politician to endorse California Proposition 47, legislation that recategorized certain nonviolent offenses from felonies to misdemeanors, including shoplifting, grand theft, and receiving stolen property valued at under $950. Voters passed the measure on November 4, 2014. In July 2015, Newsom released the Blue Ribbon Commission on Marijuana Policy's final report, which he had convened with the American Civil Liberties Union of California in 2013. The report's recommendations to regulate cannabis were intended to inform a legalization measure on the November 2016 ballot. Newsom supported the resulting measure, Proposition 64, which legalized cannabis use and cultivation for California state residents who are 21 or older.

On February 24, 2017, in response to pro-enforcement statements by White House Press Secretary Sean Spicer, Newsom sent Attorney General Jeff Sessions and President Donald Trump a letter urging them not to increase federal enforcement against recreational cannabis firms opening in California. He wrote: "The government must not strip the legal and publicly supported industry of its business and hand it back to drug cartels and criminals ... Dealers don't card kids. I urge you and your administration to work in partnership with California and the other eight states that have legalized recreational marijuana for adult use in a way that will let us enforce our state laws that protect the public and our children while targeting the bad actors." Newsom responded to comments by Spicer that compared cannabis to opioids: "Unlike marijuana, opioids represent an addictive and harmful substance, and I would welcome your administration's focused efforts on tackling this particular public health crisis."

=== Education ===
Newsom joined Long Beach City College Superintendent Eloy Oakley in a November 2015 op-ed calling for the creation of the California College Promise, which would create partnerships between public schools, public universities, and employers and offer a free community college education. Throughout 2016, he joined Oakland mayor Libby Schaaf at the launch of the Oakland Promise and Second Lady Jill Biden and Los Angeles mayor Eric Garcetti at the launch of the LA Promise. In June 2016, Newsom helped secure $15 million in the state budget to support the creation of promise programs throughout the state.

In December 2015, Newsom called on the University of California to reclassify computer science courses as a core academic class to incentivize more high schools to offer computer science curricula. He sponsored successful legislation signed by Governor Brown in September 2016, that began the planning process for expanding computer science education to all state students, beginning as early as kindergarten. In 2016, Newsom led an effort to enact a series of reforms at the University of California to give student-athletes additional academic and injury-related support, and to ensure that contracts for athletic directors and coaches emphasized academic progress. This came in response to several athletics programs, including the University of California–Berkeley's football team, which had the lowest graduation rates in the country.

=== Technology in government ===
Newsom released his first book, Citizenville: How to Take the Town Square Digital and Reinvent Government, on February 7, 2013. The book discusses the Gov 2.0 movement taking place across the nation. After its release, Newsom began to work with the Center for Information Technology Research in the Interest of Society at the University of California, Berkeley, on the California Report Card (CRC). The CRC is a mobile-optimized platform that allows state residents to "grade" their state on six timely issues. The CRC exemplifies ideas presented in Citizenville, encouraging direct public involvement in government affairs via technology. In 2015, Newsom partnered with the Institute for Advanced Technology and Public Policy at California Polytechnic State University to launch Digital Democracy, an online tool that uses facial and voice recognition to enable users to navigate California legislative proceedings.

== Gubernatorial campaigns ==
Results of the 2018 California gubernatorial election; Newsom won the counties in blue

Results of the 2021 California gubernatorial recall election; No on recall won the counties in yellowish-brown khaki colors

Results of the 2022 California gubernatorial election; Newsom won the counties in blue

=== 2010 election ===
On April 21, 2009, Newsom announced his candidacy for governor of California in the 2010 election. He named state senator (and future U.S. senator) Alex Padilla to chair his campaign. He received former president Bill Clinton's endorsement in September. Throughout the campaign, he had low poll numbers, trailing Democratic frontrunner Jerry Brown by more than 20 points in most polls. Newsom dropped out of the race in October and ran for lieutenant governor instead.

=== 2018 election ===
On February 11, 2015, Newsom announced that he was opening a campaign account for governor in the 2018 elections, allowing him to raise funds for a campaign to succeed Brown as governor of California. On June 5, 2018, he finished in the top two in the nonpartisan blanket primary, and he defeated Republican John H. Cox by a landslide in the November 6 general election.

=== 2021 recall election ===
Newsom was sworn in on January 7, 2019. Several recall attempts were launched against Newsom early in his tenure but failed to gain much traction. On February 21, 2020, a recall petition was introduced by Orrin Heatlie, a deputy sheriff in Yolo County. The petition mentioned Newsom's sanctuary state policy and said laws he endorsed favored "foreign nationals, in our country illegally"; said that California had high homelessness, high taxes, and low quality of life; and described other grievances. The California secretary of state approved it for circulation on June 10, 2020.

Forcing the gubernatorial recall election required a total of 1,495,709 verified signatures. By August 2020, 55,000 signatures were submitted and verified by the secretary of state, and 890 new valid signatures were submitted by October 2020. The petition was initially given a signature deadline of November 17, 2020, but it was extended to March 17, 2021, after Judge James P. Arguelles ruled that petitioners could have more time because of the pandemic. Newsom's attendance at a party at The French Laundry in November 2020, despite his public health measures; voter anger over lockdowns, job losses, school and business closures; and a $31 billion fraud scandal at the state unemployment agency were credited for the recall's growing support. The French Laundry event took place on November 6, and between November 5 and December 7 over 442,000 new signatures were submitted and verified; 1,664,010 verified signatures, representing roughly 98% of the final total of 1,719,900, were submitted between November 2020 and March 17, 2021. In response to the criticism, Newsom said in a statement, "While the First Partner and I followed the restaurant's health protocols and took safety precautions, I should have modeled better behavior and not joined the dinner."

During the campaign, Newsom compared the recall effort to the attempts to overturn the 2020 United States presidential election. On September 14, 2021, the recall election was held, and only 38% voted to recall Newsom, so he remained in office.

=== 2022 election ===
In 2022, Newsom was elected to a second term, defeating Republican state senator Brian Dahle with 59.2% of the vote. This was a smaller margin of victory than in 2018, and the first time since 2010 that the Democratic gubernatorial nominee did not win at least 60% of the vote.

== Governor of California (2019–present) ==
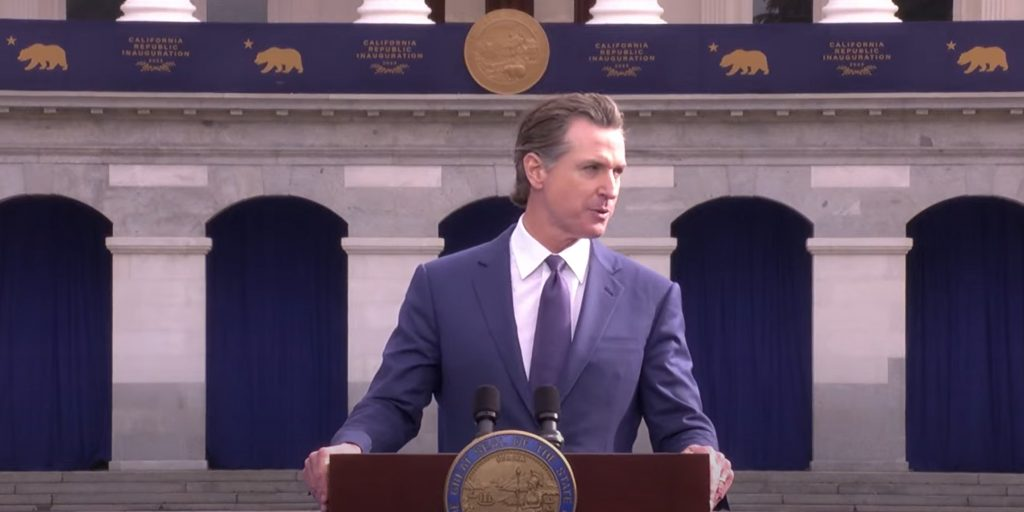
Newsom at his second gubernatorial swearing-in ceremony, at the Plaza de California, 2023

A CalMatters analysis published in 2019 found Newsom's political positions to be more moderate than those of almost every Democratic state legislator in California.

=== Appointments ===
After U.S. Senator Kamala Harris was elected vice president of the United States in the 2020 U.S. presidential election, Newsom appointed Secretary of State of California Alex Padilla to succeed her as California's junior U.S. senator. To replace Padilla as secretary of state, Newsom appointed Assemblywoman Shirley Weber. After the U.S. Senate confirmed Xavier Becerra as U.S. Secretary of Health and Human Services, Newsom appointed Rob Bonta Attorney General of California. In an interview with Joy Reid, Newsom was asked whether he would appoint a Black woman to replace Dianne Feinstein if she were to retire from the Senate or die before her term ended in 2024; Newsom replied that he would. Feinstein died in September 2023, and Newsom faced pressure to quickly appoint a successor. He fulfilled his promise and appointed Laphonza Butler to the seat.

=== Criminal justice ===
==== Capital punishment ====
On March 13, 2019, three years after voters narrowly rejected its repeal in the 2016 California Proposition 62, Newsom declared a moratorium on the state's death penalty, preventing any execution in the state as long as he remained governor. The move also led to the withdrawal of the state's current lethal injection protocol and the execution chamber's closure at San Quentin State Prison. In a CBS This Morning interview, Newsom said that the death penalty is "a racist system ... that is perpetuating inequality. It's a system that I cannot in good conscience support." The moratorium granted a temporary reprieve for all 737 inmates on California's death row, then the largest death row in the Western Hemisphere.

In January 2022, Newsom directed the state to begin dismantling its death row in San Quentin, to be transformed into a "space for rehabilitation programs", as all the condemned inmates were moving to other prisons that have maximum security facilities. The state's voters upheld capital punishment in 2012 and 2016, agreeing when they did so in 2016 to move the condemned to other prisons. While a 2021 poll by the UC Berkeley Institute of Governmental Studies and co-sponsored by the Los Angeles Times suggested declining support for capital punishment among California's voters, Republican opponents criticized Newsom's moves to halt capital punishment in California as defiance of the will of voters, and capital punishment advocates said they denied closure to murder victims' families.

On November 5, 2026, Newsom commuted the death sentences of all 548 inmates on California's death row. In an open letter to California residents, he wrote: "State-sanctioned killing is incompatible with California's values, undermines the foundations of our legal system and diminishes each of us. I know we cannot execute people in our imperfect legal system and remain true to our core values, first among them justice and human decency."

==== Clemency ====
In response to the Trump administration's crackdown on immigrants with criminal records, Newsom gave heightened consideration to people in this situation. A pardon can eliminate the grounds for deportation of immigrants who would otherwise be legal permanent residents. Pardon requests from people facing deportation are given expedited review by the state Board of Parole Hearings, per a 2018 California law. In his first acts of clemency as governor, Newsom pardoned seven formerly incarcerated people in May 2019, including two Cambodian refugees facing deportation. He pardoned three men who were attempting to avoid being deported to Cambodia or Vietnam in November 2019. They had separately committed crimes when they were each 19 years old. In December 2019, Newsom granted parole to a Cambodian refugee who had been held in a California prison due to a murder case. Although immigrant rights groups wanted Newsom to end policies allowing the transfer to federal agents, the refugee was turned over for possible deportation upon release.

On January 13, 2022, Newsom denied parole to Sirhan Sirhan, Robert F. Kennedy's assassin, who had been recommended for parole by a parole board after serving 53 years in prison. Newsom wrote an op-ed for the Los Angeles Times saying Sirhan "still lacks the insight that would prevent him from making the kind of dangerous and destructive decisions he made in the past. The most glaring proof of Sirhan's deficient insight is his shifting narrative about his assassination of Kennedy, and his current refusal to accept responsibility for it."

==== Police reform ====
Newsom has spoken in favor of Assembly Bill 1196, which would ban carotid artery restraints and choke holds in California. He said that there is no longer a place for a policing tactic "that literally is designed to stop people's blood from flowing into their brain, that has no place any longer in 21st-century practices". Newsom has signed the California Act to Save Lives and California Racial Justice Act of 2020. In September 2021, he signed legislation raising the minimum age to become a police officer from 18 to 21. Also in the bills were restrictions on the use of tear gas and a ban on police departments employing officers after misconduct or crimes. Among the bills was the George Floyd Bill, requiring officers to intervene when witnessing excessive force on the part of another officer.

Newsom vetoed Assembly Bill 2681 which sought to restrict autonomous weapons citing "beneficial law enforcement use of such devices". Newsom vetoed Assembly Bill 2632, which sought to limit solitary confinement. In October 2024, Newsom vetoed Assembly Bill 2693, which sought to extend the statute of limitations for those sexually abused in juvenille facilities. In 2025, Newsom vetoed Senate Bill 274, which would have expanded the rules and regulations on law enforcement agencies, in California, use of automated license plate readers. In his veto message, he stated the proposed regulations, which would have required police to better document their searches and delete unused data within 60 days, could hinder police work.

=== Disasters and emergencies ===
==== COVID-19 pandemic ====
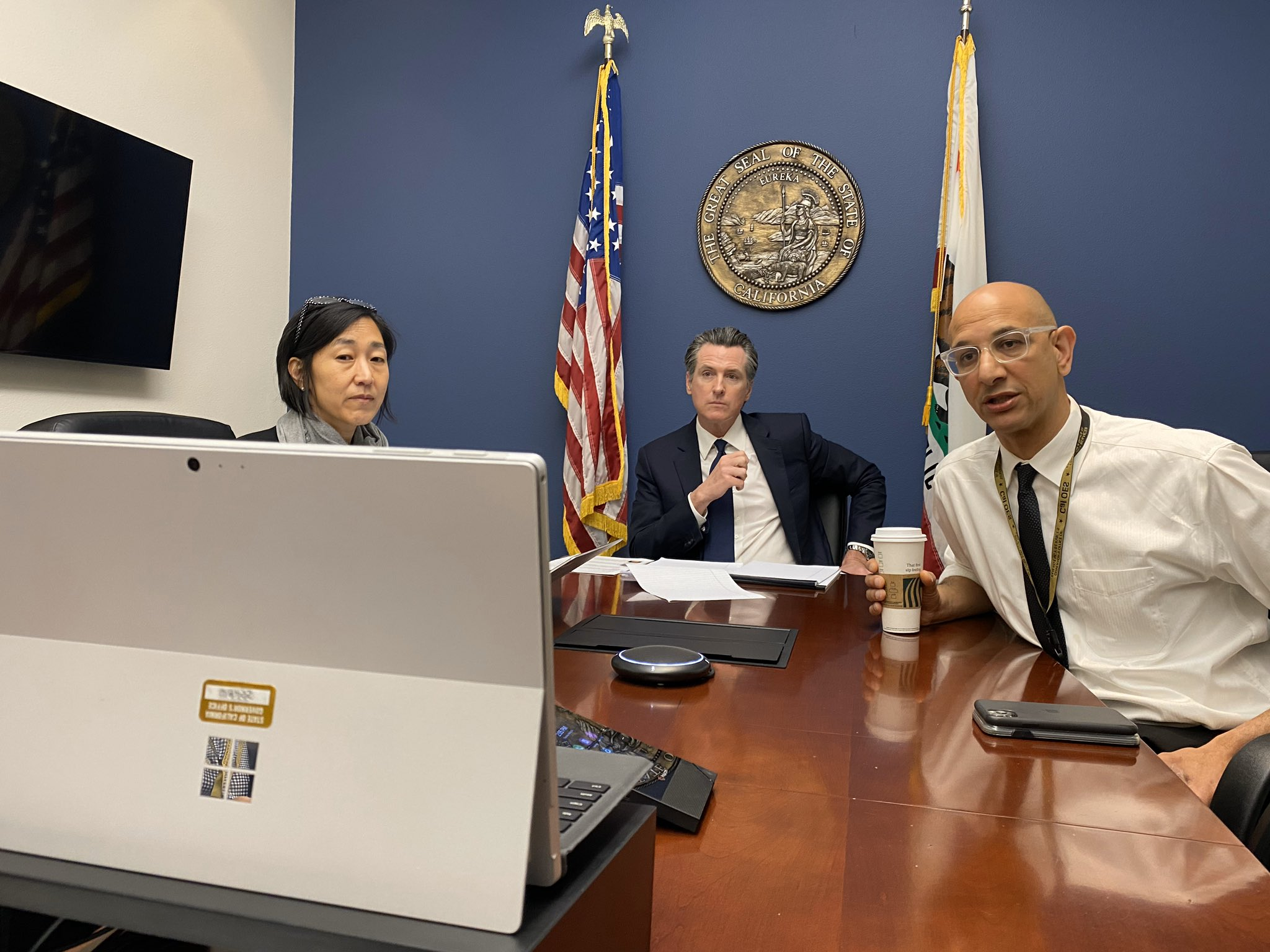
Newsom meets with health officials on the COVID-19 pandemic, March 2020

Newsom declared a state of emergency on March 4, 2020, after the first death in California attributable to the novel SARS-CoV-2 coronavirus disease (COVID-19). His stated intention was to help California prepare for and contain COVID-19's spread. The emergency declaration allowed state agencies to more easily procure equipment and services, share information on patients and alleviated restrictions on the use of state-owned properties and facilities. Newsom also announced that mitigation policies for the state's estimated 108,000 unsheltered homeless people would be prioritized, with a significant push to move them indoors.

Newsom issued an executive order that allowed the state to commandeer hotels and medical facilities to treat COVID-19 patients and permitted government officials to hold teleconferences in private without violating open meeting laws. He also directed local school districts to make their own decisions on school closures, but used an executive order to ensure students' needs would be met whether or not their school was physically open. The U.S. Department of Agriculture approved the Newsom administration's request to offer meal service during school closures, which included families being able to pick up those meals at libraries, parks, or other off-campus locations. Roughly 80% of students at California's public schools receive free or reduced-price meals. This executive order included continued funding for remote learning opportunities and child care options during workday hours.

As the number of confirmed COVID-19 cases in the state continued to rise, on March 15, Newsom urged people 65 and older and those with chronic health conditions to isolate themselves from others. He also called on bars and brewery and winery tasting rooms to close their doors to patrons. Some local jurisdictions had mandatory closures. The closures were extended to movie theaters and health clubs. He asked restaurants to stop serving meals inside their establishments and offer take-out meals only. His statewide stay-at-home order became mandatory on March 19. It limited in-house gatherings, including religious gatherings and Bible studies. It allowed movement outside the home for necessities or recreation, but people were required to maintain a safe distance apart. Activity "needed to maintain continuity of operation of the federal critical infrastructure sectors, critical government services, schools, childcare, and construction" was excluded from the order. Essential services such as grocery stores and pharmacies remained open. Newsom provided state funds to pay for protective measures such as hotel room lodging for hospital and other essential workers fearing returning home and infecting family members. By April 26, he had issued 30 executive orders under the state of emergency while the legislature had not been in session.

On April 28, Newsom and the governors of Oregon and Washington announced a "shared approach" for reopening their economies. His administration outlined key indicators for altering his stay-at-home mandate, including the ability to closely monitor and track potential cases, prevent infection of high-risk people, increase surge capacity at hospitals, develop therapeutics, ensure physical distancing at schools, businesses, and child-care facilities, and develop guidelines for restoring isolation orders if the virus surges. The plan to end the shutdown had four phases. Newsom emphasized that easing restrictions would be based on data, not dates, saying, "We will base reopening plans on facts and data, not on ideology. Not what we want. Not what we hope." Of a return of Major League Baseball and the NFL, he said, "I would move very cautiously in that expectation."

In early May, Newsom announced that certain retailers could reopen for pickup. Most Californians approved of Newsom's handling of the crisis and were more concerned about reopening too early than too late, but there were demonstrations and protests against these policies. Under pressure, Newsom delegated more decision-making on reopening to the local level. That same month, he announced a plan for registered voters to have the option to vote by mail in the November election. California was the first state in the country to commit to sending mail-in ballots to all registered voters for the November general election.

On May 25, 2020, Newsom announced the state had approved 43 counties' applications to accelerate their reopening plans. After pressure from the Department of Justice and after more than 1,000 churches said they would reopen, Newsom announced that churches would be allowed to open at 25% capacity. On April 9, 2021, the Supreme Court ruled against Newsom for a fifth and final time regarding his prohibitions and limits on religious gatherings. In a 5-4 decision, the court ruled that California unfairly singled out religious gatherings for restrictions and struck down the remaining restrictions on at-home religious gatherings.

As the state opened up, the Los Angeles Times found that new coronavirus hospitalizations in California began accelerating around June 15 at a rate not seen since early April, immediately after the virus began rapidly spreading in the state. On June 18, Newsom made face coverings mandatory for all Californians in an effort to reduce COVID-19's spread. Enforcement was up to business owners, as local law enforcement agencies saw non-compliance as a minor infraction. By the end of June, Newsom had ordered seven counties to close bars and nightspots and recommended that eight other counties take action on their own to close those businesses due to a surge of coronavirus cases in parts of the state. In a regular press conference on July 13 as he was ordering the reinstatement of the shutdown of bars and indoor dining in restaurants, he said, "We're seeing an increase in the spread of the virus, so that's why it's incumbent upon all of us to recognize soberly that COVID-19 is not going away any time soon until there is a vaccine or an effective therapy".

Newsom oversaw a sluggish initial rollout of vaccines; California had one of the lowest vaccination rates in the country by January 2021, and had only used about 30% of the vaccines it had at its disposal, a far lower rate than other states, by January 20. Newsom had an approval rating of 64% in September 2020, but a February 2021 UC Berkeley Institute of Governmental Studies poll found that his approval rate was down to 46%, with 48% disapproval, the highest of his tenure. The Los Angeles Times attributed this decline to public opinion of his management of the pandemic. The vaccination rate began increasing in January, with over half the population fully vaccinated as of September 2021, the percentage ranking #16 out of the 50 states.

While the Newsom administration enacted some of the country's most stringent pandemic restrictions in 2020, by May 2021 California had the 29th-highest COVID-19 death rate among the 50 states. Monica Gandhi, a professor of medicine at UCSF, said that California's restrictive approach "did not lead to better health outcomes", and criticized California's delay in implementing new CDC recommendations absolving the fully vaccinated from most indoor mask requirements, saying the decision lacked a scientific rationale and could cause "collateral damage".

==== Pandemic unemployment fraud and debt ====
In January 2021, the Los Angeles Times reported that Newsom's administration had mismanaged $11.4 billion by disbursing unemployment benefits to ineligible claimants, especially those paid through the federally funded Pandemic Unemployment Assistance program. Another $19 billion in claims remained under investigation for fraud. At the same time, legitimate claimants faced lengthy delays in receiving benefits. The state's unemployment system had been overseen by California Labor Secretary Julie Su, a Newsom appointee, whom President Joe Biden later appointed as deputy secretary of labor in February 2021.

Political opponents attributed the crisis to the Newsom administration's failure to heed multiple warnings by federal officials of the potential for fraud, while Newsom's administration said the Trump administration's failure to provide appropriate guidance for the new federally funded program contributed to the fraud. Experts said much of the fraud appeared to originate from international criminal gangs in 20 countries. A report by California State Auditor Elaine Howle said $810 million was disbursed to claimants who had fraudulently filed on behalf of inmates in the state's prison system.

According to The Sacramento Bee, by the summer of 2021, California owed $23 billion to the federal government for unemployment benefits paid out during the pandemic, which was 43% of all unemployment debt, owed by 13 states at the time, to the federal government. Most of this debt was unrelated to the federally funded pandemic unemployment programs that had experienced most of the fraud, and instead was due to longstanding underfunding and California's high rate of unemployment during the pandemic.

==== Wildfires ====
Due to a mass die-off of trees throughout California that could increase the risk of wildfires, Newsom declared a state of emergency on March 22, 2019, in preparation for the 2019 wildfire season. After declaring another state of emergency on August 18, 2020, he reported that the state was battling 367 known fires, many sparked by intense thunderstorms on August 16–17. His request for assistance via issuance of a federal disaster declaration in the wake of six major wildfires was first rejected by the Trump administration, but accepted after Trump spoke to Newsom.

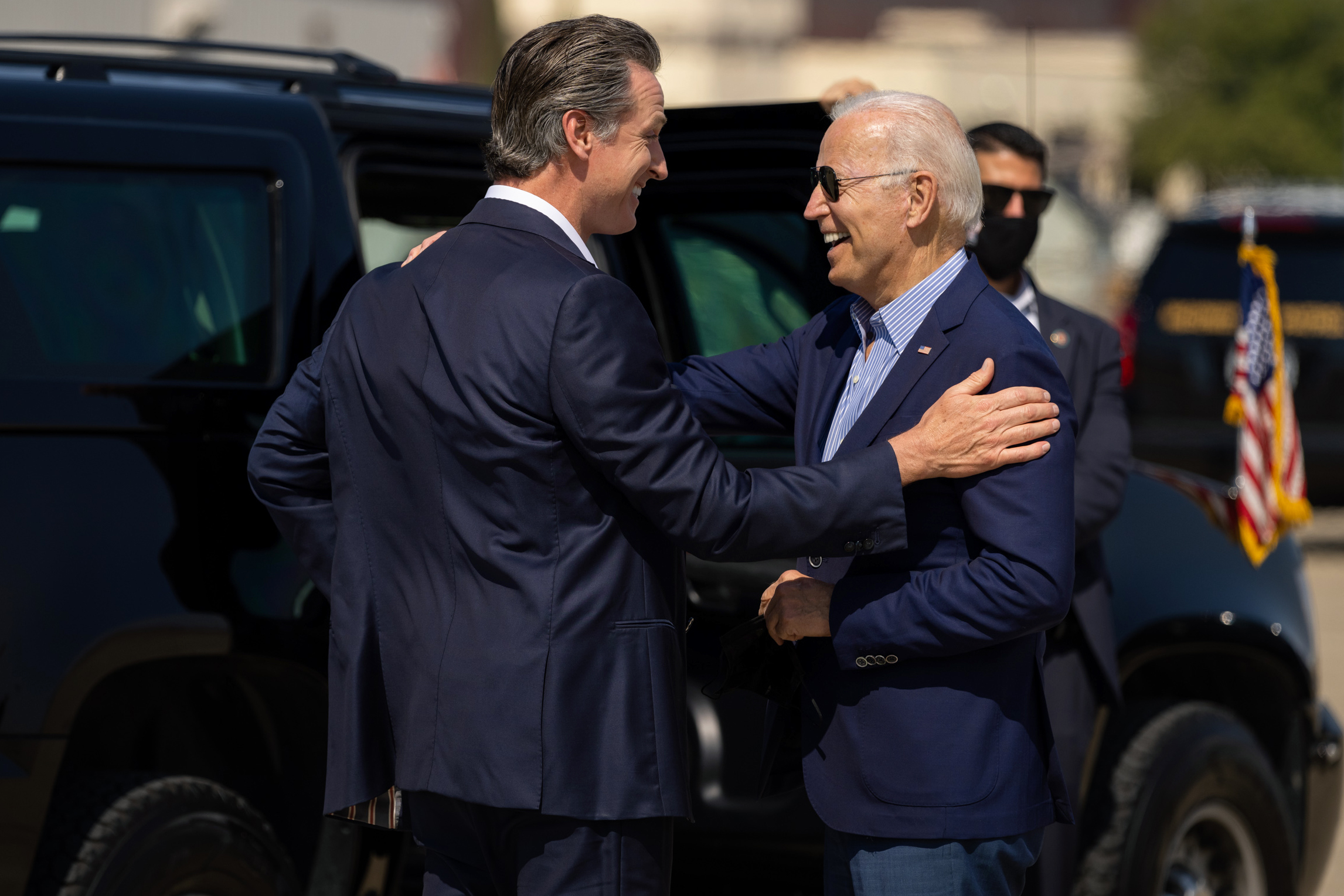
Newsom meeting with President Joe Biden in 2021 for a briefing on wildfires at the California Governor's Office of Emergency Services

On June 23, 2021, the NPR station CapRadio reported that Newsom and Cal Fire had falsely claimed in January 2020 that 90,000 acres (36,000 ha) of land at risk for wildfires had been treated with fuel breaks and prescribed burns; the actual treated area was 11,399 acres (4,613 ha), an overstatement of 690%. According to CapRadio, the fuel breaks of the 35 "priority projects" Newsom had touted, which were meant to ensure the quick evacuation of residents while preventing traffic jams and a repeat of events in the 2018 fire that destroyed the town of Paradise, where at least eight evacuees burned to death in their vehicles, were struggling to mitigate fire spread in almost every instance while failing to prevent evacuation traffic jams. The same day CapRadio revealed the oversight, leaked emails showed that Newsom's handpicked Cal Fire chief had ordered the removal of the original statement. In another report in April 2022, CapRadio found a program, hailed in 2020 by the Newsom administration to fast-track environmental reviews on high-priority fire prevention projects, had failed to make progress.

KXTV released a series of reports chronicling PG&E's liabilities after committing 91 felonies in the Santa Rosa and Paradise fires. Newsom was accused of accepting campaign donations from PG&E in order to change the CPUC's ruling on PG&E's safety license. The rating change allowed PG&E to avoid billions of dollars in extra fees. Newsom was also accused of setting up the Wildfire Insurance Fund via AB 1054, using ratepayer fees, so PG&E could avoid financial losses and pass the liability costs to ratepayers and taxpayers.

==== Political disagreements with Donald Trump ====
Newsom and Donald Trump have had a prolonged dispute over governance in California and federal policy. Trump has repeatedly criticized Newsom's handling of wildfires, immigration policies, and the general administration of the state, often using derogatory language. In response, Newsom has made sharply critical statements on social media, including personal insults aimed at Trump in 2025 and 2026.

==== June 2025 Los Angeles protests and Kilmar Abrego Garcia ====
In June 2025, protests broke out in Los Angeles after a series of federal immigration raids. As demonstrations continued, President Trump issued a memorandum federalizing up to 4,000 California National Guard troops and deploying U.S. Marines to assist with the response. Newsom objected, calling it an unconstitutional overreach of federal authority. On June 9, the State of California, led by Newsom, filed a federal lawsuit, Newsom v. Trump, challenging the legality of the troop deployment. The complaint argued that the order exceeded the president's statutory powers under 10 U.S.C. § 252 and violated the Tenth Amendment and the Posse Comitatus Act. In April 2025, Newsom called the illegal deportation of Kilmar Abrego Garcia to El Salvador "the distraction of the day" set up by the Trump administration. U.S. Senator Chris Van Hollen criticized Newsom's comment, saying, "I think Americans are tired of elected officials or politicians who are all finger to the wind. Anyone who can't stand up for the Constitution and the right of due process doesn't deserve to lead."

=== Energy and environment ===
Newsom talks about climate change at North Complex Fire, September 2020

Upon taking office in 2019, Newsom succeeded Brown as co-chair of the United States Climate Alliance. In September 2019, Newsom vetoed SB 1, which would have preserved environmental protections at the state level that were set to roll back nationally under the Trump administration's environmental policy. In February 2020, the Newsom administration sued federal agencies over the rollbacks to protect imperiled fish in the Sacramento–San Joaquin River Delta in 2019.

Newsom attended the 2019 UN Climate Action Summit, where he spoke of California as a climate leader due to the actions of governors before him. In August 2020, he addressed the 2020 Democratic National Convention. His speech mentioned climate change and the wildfires prevalent in California at the time. On September 23, 2020, Newsom signed an executive order to phase out sales of gasoline-powered vehicles and require all new passenger vehicles sold in the state to be zero-emission by 2035. Bills he signed in September with an environmental focus included a commission to study lithium extraction around the Salton Sea.

During his 2018 campaign, Newsom pledged to tighten state oversight of fracking and oil extraction. Early in his governorship, his administration approved new oil and gas leases on public lands at about twice the rate of the prior year. When asked about this development, Newsom said he was unaware of the rate of approvals, and he later fired the head of the Division of Oil, Gas and Geothermal Resources. In November 2019, he imposed a moratorium on approval of new hydraulic fracturing and steam-injected oil drilling in the state until the permits for those projects could be reviewed by an independent panel of scientists. State agencies resumed issuing new hydraulic fracturing permits in April 2020. In 2021, the Center for Biological Diversity sued the Newsom administration over the continued sale of oil and gas leases, and Consumer Watchdog called for the end of their sale. In April 2021, Newsom committed to ending the sale of gas leases by 2024 and ending oil extraction by 2045. In October 2021, he proposed a 3,200-foot (980 m) buffer between new fossil fuel extraction sites and densely populated areas.

In 2022, gas prices in California exceeded $6 per gallon. Newsom attributed this to corporate greed and price gouging by oil companies. He proposed a windfall profits tax and penalty for oil companies in September 2022. On March 28, 2023, Newsom signed a law that authorizes the California Energy Commission to set "a profit threshold above which companies would be assessed a financial penalty", requires petroleum companies to report additional profit data to state regulators, and creates a new oversight division of the California Energy Commission to investigate price gouging in the gasoline industry. In June 2025, Newsom signed California Assembly Bill 130 (2025) into law. In October 2025, Newsom vetoed Senate Bill 682 which sought to limit forever chemicals and Assembly Bill 93 which sought to require data centers to report their water use.

=== Ethics concerns ===
==== Donations to spouse's nonprofit organization ====
The Sacramento Bee reported that Jennifer Siebel Newsom's nonprofit organization The Representation Project had received more than $800,000 in donations from corporations that had lobbied the state government in recent years, including PG&E, AT&T, Comcast, and Kaiser Permanente. Siebel Newsom received $2.3 million in salary from the nonprofit since launching it in 2011. In 2021, Governor Newsom said that he saw no conflict in his wife's nonprofit accepting donations from companies that lobby his administration.

==== Donations to campaign ====
In February 2024, Bloomberg News reported that Newsom pushed for an exemption for businesses that bake and sell bread in AB 1228, a bill that raises the state's minimum wage for fast food workers to $20 per hour. The exemption included 24 Panera Bread bakery-cafes owned by Greg Flynn, a businessman who donated $100,000 and $64,800 to Newsom's campaigns over the years. Republican lawmakers called for an investigation into the unusual exemption. When reporters asked him about the exemption, Newsom said: "That's a part of the sausage making. We went back and forth, and that was part of the negotiation. That's the nature of negotiation ... That was all part of the give and take and that was the collective wisdom of the legislature and ultimately led to my signature."

In September 2024, the Los Angeles Times reported that Newsom had signed AB 3206 into law, carving out an exception to the state's last call alcohol law for one specific venue, Intuit Dome, owned by former Microsoft CEO Steve Ballmer. Ballmer's wife, Connie Ballmer, donated $1 million to the Newsom campaign in 2021. Ethics experts criticized the bill for exclusively benefiting a major donor to Newsom. "It's certainly going to become an issue for his opponents and critics to point to the fact that he seemed to provide a special favor to a wealthy sports franchise owner and its facility and its wealthy fans. It just doesn't look good", said John Pelissero, director of government ethics at Santa Clara University. A spokesperson for Newsom said, "The governor's decisions on legislation are made solely on the merits of each bill."

=== Executive authority and actions ===
Overall, Newsom has vetoed legislation at a rate comparable to that of his predecessors. From 2019 to 2021, he vetoed 12.7% of the bills the legislature passed on average. The rate declined over the course of the three legislative sessions. Newsom's vetoes have included bills to allow ranked-choice voting, require an ethnic studies class as a high school graduation requirement, regulate AI, and reduce penalties for jaywalking. Newsom used a larger than normal number of executive orders during the 2020 legislative session.

=== Gun control ===
As lieutenant governor in 2016, Newsom was the official proponent of Proposition 63. The ballot measure required a background check and California Department of Justice authorization to purchase ammunition, among other gun control regulations. In response to the 2019 mass shooting in Virginia Beach, Newsom called for nationwide background checks on people purchasing ammunition. Later that year, he responded to the Gilroy Garlic Festival shooting by stating his support for the Second Amendment and saying he would like national cooperation controlling "weapons of goddamned mass destruction". He also said, "These shootings overwhelmingly, almost exclusively, are males, boys, 'men'—I put in loose quotes. I do think that is missing in the national conversation."

On June 10, 2021, Newsom called federal Judge Roger Benitez "a stone cold ideologue" and "a wholly owned subsidiary of the gun lobby of the National Rifle Association" after Benitez struck down California's statewide ban on assault weapons. While the ban remained in place as the state appealed the ruling, Newsom proposed legislation that would empower private citizens to enforce the ban after the United States Supreme Court declined to strike down the Texas Heartbeat Act, which empowers private citizens to report unauthorized abortions.

In 2022, Newsom signed gun control bills passed by the California Legislature. On July 1, he signed Assembly Bill 1621, which restricts privately made firearms, which were found to be linked to over 100 violent crimes in Los Angeles, and Assembly Bill 2571, which prohibited the marketing of firearms such as the JR-15 to children. On July 22, Newsom signed Senate Bill 1327, a law enabling private citizens to sue anyone who imports, distributes, manufactures or sells illegal firearms in California. The law requires courts to award statutory damages of at least $10,000 and attorney's fees.

On June 8, 2023, Newsom proposed a 28th amendment to the U.S. Constitution to raise the age to buy firearms to 21, institute universal background checks for gun purchases, mandate waiting periods and ban assault weapons for civilians. Law professor Erwin Chemerinsky called this a "terrible idea", since the advocated method (which has never been used) would be a constitutional convention (which is not understood to be limited to single amendments), potentially allowing a complete rewrite of the Constitution, or addition of other amendments on separate subjects, like abortion, or the often proposed balanced budget amendment (which liberals feel would decimate welfare programs).

=== Abortion ===
In December 2021, Newsom announced his intention to make California a "sanctuary" for abortion, which included possibly paying for procedures, travel, and lodging for out-of-state abortion seekers, if the procedure is banned in Republican-led states. In March 2022, he signed a bill requiring private health insurance plans in the state to fully cover abortion procedures by eliminating associated co-pays and deductibles and increasing insurance premiums. In February 2023, Newsom organized the Reproductive Freedom Alliance of state governors supportive of abortion and reproductive rights. After Walgreens announced in March 2023 that it would refuse to dispense abortion pills in the 21 states where it is illegal, Newsom tweeted, "California won't be doing business with @walgreens – or any company that cowers to the extremists and puts women's lives at risk, we're done." He also said that Walgreens was giving in to "right-wing bullies" and that he would determine how California could cut ties with it. He indicated that he wanted to cancel Walgreens's $54 million contract with the California state prison system. Walgreens also receives $1.5 billion for filling prescriptions for the 15 million people enrolled in the state's Medi-Cal program (California's version of Medicaid). Legal experts said that federal Medicaid laws do not allow health plans to disqualify providers for reasons other than fraud or contract violations, provisions that have prevented conservative states from blocking Medicaid spending to Planned Parenthood clinics.

=== Health ===
Newsom campaigned on reducing the cost of health care and increasing access. He also indicated his support for creating a universal state health-care system. The budget passed in June 2019 expanded eligibility for Medi-Cal from solely undocumented minor children to undocumented young adults from ages 19 to 25. In 2021, Newsom signed legislation expanding Medi-Cal eligibility to undocumented residents over age 50. On June 30, 2022, he signed a $307.9 billion state budget that "pledges to make all low-income adults eligible for the state's Medicaid program by 2024 regardless of their immigration status." This budget would make California the first U.S. state to guarantee healthcare to all low-income undocumented immigrants, at a cost of $2.7 billion per year.

Newsom was criticized in early 2022 for walking back from his support for universal health care and not supporting CalCare, Assembly Bill 1400, which would have instituted single-payer healthcare in California; critics suggested that opposition from business interests, which had donated large sums to Newsom and his party, had swayed his opinion.

On July 6, 2022, Newsom signed Senate Bill 184, which established the Office of Health Care Affordability, with the stated goal to "develop data-informed policies and enforceable cost targets, with the ultimate goal of containing health care costs". In August 2022, Newsom vetoed Senate Bill 57 which sought to authorize jurisdictions to approve supervised injection sites. Newsom signed The Zacky Bill. In October 2023, Newsom vetoed a bill to cap co-pays for insulin at $35. In 2025, Newsom signed a budget that restricted new enrollment of undocumented immigrants in Medi-Cal. Newsom signed the California Senate Bill 41 (2025) but vetoed other measures to regulate pharmacy benefit managers.

==== Medical aid in dying ====
In 2021, Newsom signed Senate Bill 380, which amended the California End of Life Option Act by shortening the required interval between a patient's two oral requests for an aid-in-dying drug from 15 days to 48 hours, eliminated the requirement for a final attestation, and extended the Act's expiration date to January 1, 2031. In 2025, he signed Senate Bill 403, which repealed the provision setting that expiration date, thereby extending the Act indefinitely.

=== Infrastructure and development ===
==== High-speed rail ====
In his February 2019 State of the State address, Newsom announced that, while work would continue on the 171-mile (275 km) Central Valley segment from Bakersfield to Merced, the rest of the system would be indefinitely postponed, citing cost overruns and delays. This and other actions created tension with the State Building and Construction Trades Council of California, a labor union representing 450,000 members.

==== Homelessness and housing shortage ====
A poll found that California voters thought the most important issue for Newsom and the state legislature to work on in 2020 was homelessness. In his first week of office, Newsom threatened to withhold state funding for infrastructure to communities that failed to take actions to alleviate California's housing shortage. In late January 2019, he announced that he would sue Huntington Beach for preventing the construction of affordable housing. A year later, the city acted to settle the lawsuit by the state. Newsom opposes NIMBY (not-in-my-back-yard) sentiment, declaring in 2022 that "NIMBYism is destroying the state". In 2021, he signed a pair of bills into law that made zoning regulations for housing less restrictive, allowing construction of duplexes and fourplexes in lots that were previously zoned exclusively for single-family homes. Newsom also signed a bill that expedites the environmental review process for new multifamily developments worth at least $15,000,000. To participate, developers must apply directly through the governor's office.

In 2022, Newsom signed 39 bills into law intended to address California's housing crisis, three of which entailed major land use reform. One bill eliminated minimum parking requirements for housing near mass transit stations throughout the state. Michael Manville, an urban planning professor at the UCLA Luskin School of Public Affairs, called it "one of the biggest land-use reforms in the country". Another bill allowed developers to build housing on some lots previously zoned exclusively for commercial use without getting local governments' permission if a certain percentage of the housing was affordable. A third bill allowed for the construction of market-rate housing on some lots previously zoned exclusively for commercial use. At the signing ceremony for the latter two bills, Newsom warned local governments, which have a history of blocking and delaying housing developments, that they would be held accountable for future housing obstructionism. Other bills he signed required localities "to approve or deny various building permits within a strict timeline" and streamlined student and faculty housing projects by allowing California colleges to skip onerous review processes for new projects. Measures and actions to reduce homelessness in California have not yet solved the problem. The number of homeless reached a record 181,000 in January 2023. According to some, to cope with this problem, California must build more than 2.5 million housing units.

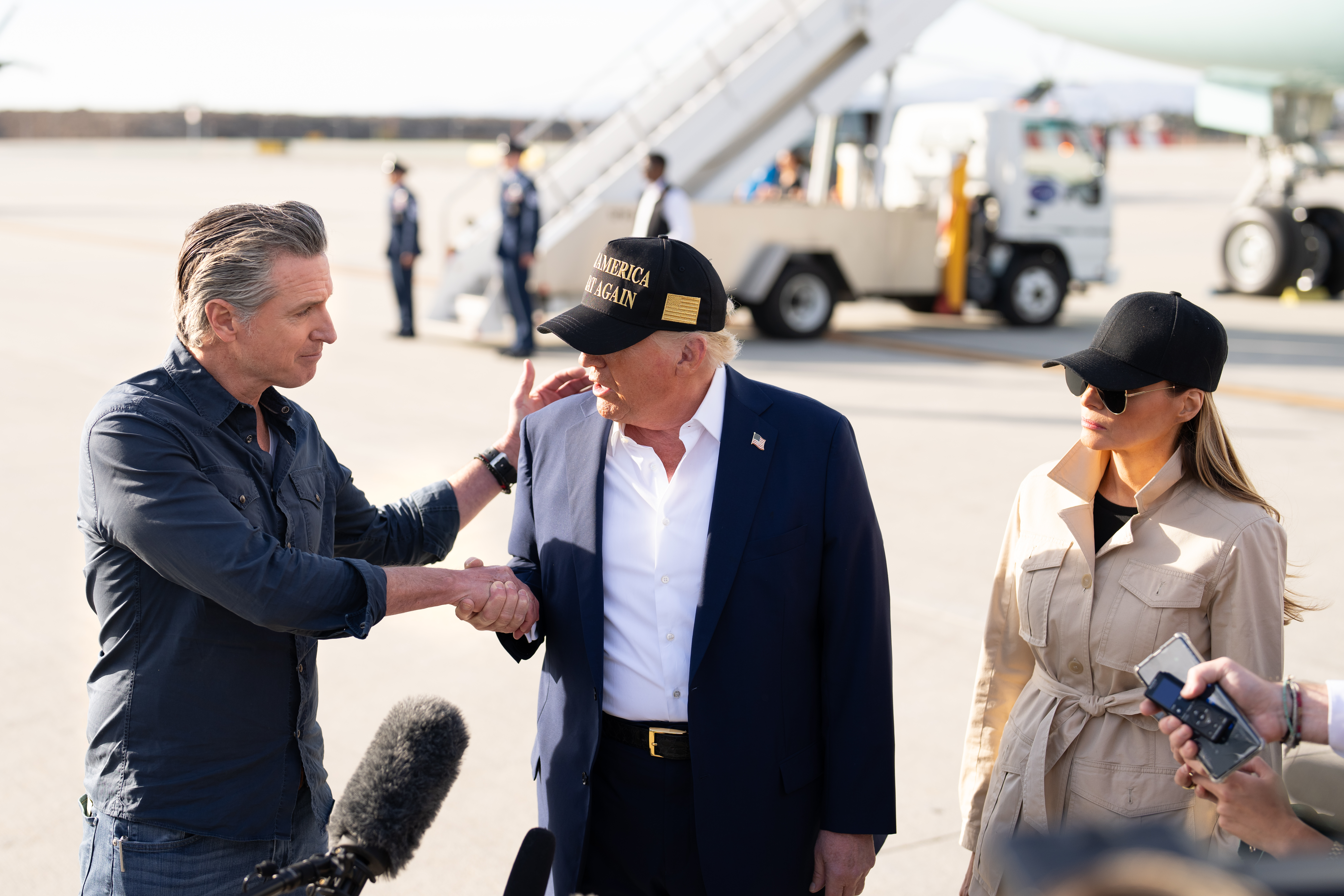
Newsom meeting with President Donald Trump and First Lady Melania Trump

In October 2023, Newsom vetoed several bills aimed at expanding access to housing assistance including the California Social Housing Act. One was a bill to repurpose unused state-owned land for affordable housing, which he said infringed on state sovereignty. Another would have expanded the number of people who qualify for state housing assistance. A third would have mandated that Medi-Cal cover the cost of housing assistance. Newsom has signed the Abundant and Affordable Homes Near Transit Act, Affordable Housing on Faith and Higher Education Lands Act, California Assembly Bill 2097 (2022) and California HOME Act. In August 2024, Newsom warned counties that did not remove their homeless encampments that failure to do so would result in their state funding being cut off the next year. He issued this warning after personally visiting and clearing out a Los Angeles homeless encampment without notifying the city beforehand. In September 2024, Newsom vetoed Assembly Bill 1840, which sought to prohibit the disqualification of applicants to California Housing Finance Agency home purchase assistance programs based solely on their immigration status.

==== Water management ====
Newsom supports a series of tentative water-sharing agreements that would bring an end to the dispute between farmers, cities, fishers, and environmentalists over how much water should be left in the state's two most important rivers, the Sacramento and San Joaquin, which flow into the Delta.

=== LGBTQ+ rights ===
In September 2022, Newsom signed Senate Bill 107 into law, making California the first sanctuary state for transgender youth. He issued an official state proclamation for Pride Month in June 2023, issued a fine of $1.5 million to a school district whose board rejected a curriculum including a biography of gay rights leader Harvey Milk, and signed a bill prohibiting schools from banning textbooks based on their inclusion of references to people from minority groups or the LGBT community. In July 2024, he signed the "SAFETY Act", which prohibits schools from outing students' gender identity to their parents without the students' consent.

Newsom later vetoed several bills that the Assembly had passed by a wide margin, one of which would have instructed judges who preside over custody battles to take into account parents' affirmation of their children's gender identity, and one of which would have mandated that insurance plans serving California residents cover the cost of gender-affirming care. This, and later comments by Newsom on his podcast calling trans women's participation in women's sports "deeply unfair", appeared to signify a change in course in which he forsook his support of key transgender issues to appeal to right-wing audiences. He received backlash from some progressive commentators and the disapproval and condemnation of several of his fellow Democrats, such as California State Assemblyman Chris Ward and California State Senator Caroline Menjivar of the LGBTQ+ Caucus, who said his comments "profoundly sickened and frustrated" them. Newsom has also been condemned and criticized by humanitarian and queer rights organizations such as the Human Rights Campaign, National Center for LGBTQ Rights, and the Los Angeles LGBT Center. The American Civil Liberties Union issued a statement saying it was "saddened and angered" by Newsom's conduct, calling on him to "lean into his role as a leader on LGBTQ+ issues and reject the hateful, extremist rhetoric".

In 2026, Newsom vetoed a bill that would have protected transgender healthcare and abortion providers from being extradited to other states. In his veto message, he said he supported protecting these services and their providers but expressed concern about the executive function of extradition.

=== Labor rights ===
Newsom signed California Assembly Bill 5 (2019). He also signed the California FAST Recovery Act (2022). In October 2023, Newsom vetoed a bill to provide unemployment insurance to striking workers, citing excess burden on the state's unemployment system. He also vetoed a bill to expand the mandatory warning given to employees soon to be laid off from 60 days to 75, extend the same protections to long-term contract workers, and prohibit employers from making laid-off employees sign nondisclosure agreements in order to receive severance. In 2024, Newsom vetoed SB 1299, which "would have required workers' comp judges to presume farmworkers who claim heat illness developed it at work". Newsom vetoed legislation seeking to extend unemployment benefits to undocumented workers.

=== Elections ===
In October 2023, Newsom vetoed Assembly Bill 1248, which sought to require independent redistricting. In September 2024, Newsom vetoed Assembly Bill 2724, which sought to require schools to ensure students receive information on how to pre-register to vote.

==== 2025 California Proposition 50 ====
In August 2025, Newsom secured legislative approval of California Proposition 50, a state constitutional amendment to allow congressional redistricting. The goal was to switch seats from Republican to Democratic control in response to the 2025 Texas gerrymander that would add five new Republican seats. Voters approved the measure in November.

== National profile ==
Newsom has been widely considered a prominent figure in liberal American politics during the 2020s. In 2023, he launched Campaign for Democracy, a political action committee to take on "authoritarian leaders" in the U.S. It is thought to be a starting point for a possible 2028 presidential bid. By July 2024, Campaign for Democracy had raised $24 million for direct contributions to candidates and other spending. The group is not subject to contribution limits and can coordinate with Newsom as long as he is not a candidate for federal office.

Many journalists and political analysts have mentioned Newsom as a presidential hopeful. According to a June 2023 poll by NewsNation, 22% of California voters wanted him to enter the 2024 U.S. presidential election. In May 2023, Arnold Schwarzenegger said it was a "no-brainer" that Newsom would someday run for president. An April 2023 The Hill article by Sharon Udasin also discussed the inevitability of a Newsom presidential run. In September 2022, Newsom said he would not run for president in 2024, citing his "vulnerable" 2021 recall. After his 2022 reelection, he told White House staff that he would not challenge President Joe Biden in the 2024 Democratic Party presidential primaries; he endorsed Biden's reelection campaign on April 25, 2023.

Newsom has become an outspoken critic of the policies of Florida governor Ron DeSantis, denouncing DeSantis's orchestration of the Martha's Vineyard migrant airlift. DeSantis responded by saying California has "huge problems" and dared Newsom to run against Biden. In November 2023, the two debated, with Fox News's Sean Hannity as moderator. In July 2024, Newsom launched a podcast, Politickin', co-hosted by Marshawn Lynch and Doug Hendrickson. After Biden's sudden withdrawal from the presidential race that month, Newsom said he would not seek the Democratic nomination, and endorsed Vice President Kamala Harris for president.

After Donald Trump won the 2024 election, Newsom called for California lawmakers to convene later in 2024 to safeguard California's policies from the second Trump administration. In December 2024, Newsom criticized Biden for pardoning his son Hunter, saying, "I'm disappointed and can't support the decision." Since the 2024 U.S. presidential election, Newsom has repeatedly declined to identify himself with either the progressive or moderate faction of the Democratic Party, calling such labels "reductive" and calling himself a "hard-headed pragmatist". He said he wants the Democratic Party to be an "inclusive" big tent, spanning the ideological spectrum "from Manchin to Mamdani". In August 2025, Newsom began communicating on social media platforms in a style intended to mock Trump's style of online communication.

In June 2026, Newsom said the United States Department of Justice was investigating him and his wife at Trump's direction.

=== 2028 presidential election ===
Newsom has expressed interest in running for president of the United States in 2028.

In anticipation of a potential 2028 U.S. presidential election campaign, Newsom has adjusted his political approach to appeal to a broader electorate. A key shift in his strategy has been his engagement with conservative voices, including hosting Trump supporters such as Charlie Kirk and Steve Bannon on his podcast, This is Gavin Newsom. This tactic has been criticized by some humanitarian and queer rights organizations both inside and outside California, including state legislators, Human Rights Campaign, and the American Civil Liberties Union. Many commentators viewed his widely publicized August 2025 Election Rigging Response Act as a soft launch of a 2028 presidential run. In May 2026, Reed Hastings was the first Democrat mega-donor to publicly declare his support for a potential Newsom presidential campaign.

== Personal life ==
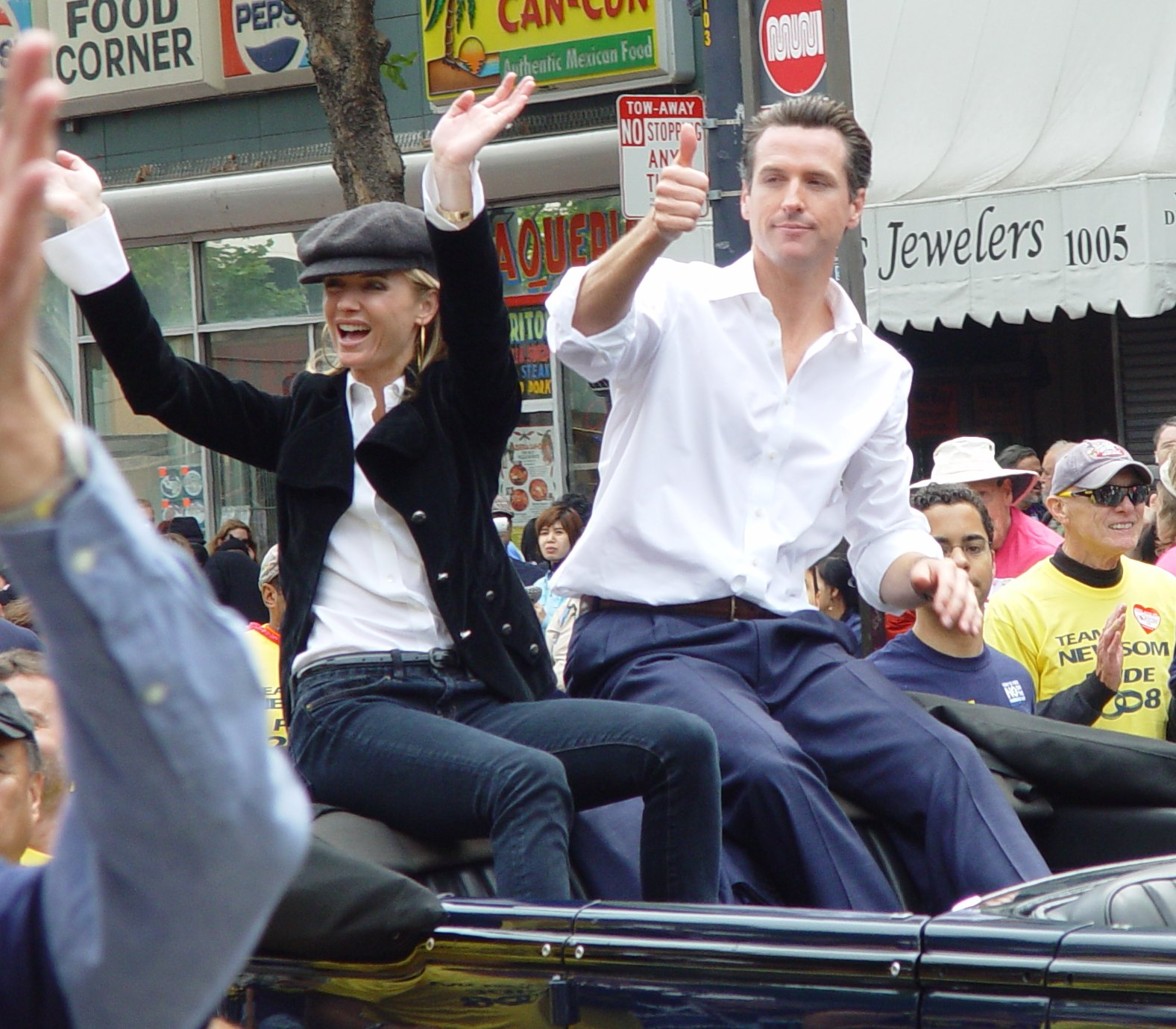
Newsom with his then-fiancée Jennifer Siebel at the 2008 San Francisco Pride parade

Newsom was baptized and raised in his father's Catholic faith. In 2008, he described himself as an "Irish Catholic rebel ... in some respects, but one that still has tremendous admiration for the Church and very strong faith"; when asked about the state of the Catholic Church, Newsom said it was in crisis. He said he stays with the Church because of his "strong connection to a greater purpose, and to sort of a higher being". Newsom identifies as a practicing Catholic, saying in 2008 that he has a "strong sense of faith that is perennial, day in and day out".

Newsom has personal ties to the Jewish community. As a child, he attended Hanukkah celebrations with Jewish extended family, went to a JCC preschool in San Francisco, and spent time at the Jewish summer camp Camp Tawonga. He credits the Jewish values he absorbed—especially tikkun olam—for shaping his identity and worldview and helping him succeed in business and politics. Newsom told his son that they are partly Jewish and have Jewish cousins in the Newsom family when one of his friends expressed antisemitic views. In 2019, he took steps to combat antisemitism by allocating $15 million for synagogue security, $6 million for the Holocaust Museum LA, and $23.5 million for Jewish summer camps affected by wildfires.

In May 2002, Newsom was at his mother's side as she died by physician-assisted suicide. She had been suffering from breast cancer and made the choice to die. Assisted suicide was not legal in California at that time.

After completing his service as mayor of San Francisco in 2011, Newsom and his family moved to a house they bought in Kentfield in Marin County in 2012. After his election as governor, Newsom and his family moved into the California Governor's Mansion in Downtown Sacramento and thereafter settled in Fair Oaks. In May 2019, The Sacramento Bee reported that Newsom's $3.7 million purchase of a 12,000-square-foot home (1,100 m^{2}) in Fair Oaks was the most expensive private residence sold in the Sacramento region since the year began. In August 2021, Newsom sold the Marin County home for $5.9 million in an off-market transaction. He had originally put the property up for sale in early 2019 for $5.895 million, but removed the property from the market after a price reduction to $5.695 million.

In February 2026, Newsom released Young Man in a Hurry: A Memoir of Discovery, a book about his family and early life.

=== Relationships and family ===
In December 2001, Newsom married legal commentator Kimberly Guilfoyle at Saint Ignatius Catholic Church. They separated in 2004 and jointly filed for divorce in January 2005, citing "difficulties due to their careers on opposite coasts". Their divorce was finalized on February 28, 2006, by which time Guilfoyle was expecting a child with Eric Villency. Guilfoyle gained prominence in 2011 via a Fox News chat show. She was later named senior advisor to Republican president Donald Trump, whom Newsom has extensively criticized, and was later engaged to Donald Trump Jr.

In September 2006, Newsom, then 38, briefly dated 19-year-old Brittanie Mountz, a model and restaurant hostess. On January 31, 2007, Newsom's close friend, campaign manager, and former chief of staff Alex Tourk confronted him after learning from his wife, Ruby Rippey-Tourk, that she and Newsom had an affair in 2005, when she was Newsom's appointments secretary. Tourk immediately resigned. Newsom admitted to the affair the next day and apologized to the public, saying he was "deeply sorry" for his "personal lapse of judgment". In 2018, Rippey-Tourk said that she thought it wrong to associate Newsom's behavior with the #MeToo movement: "I was a subordinate, but I was also a free-thinking, 33-yr old adult married woman and mother. I do want to make sure that the #metoo movement is reserved for cases and situations that deserve it."

Newsom began dating film director Jennifer Siebel in October 2006. He announced he would seek treatment for alcohol use disorder in February 2007. The couple announced their engagement in December 2007, and they were married in Stevensville, Montana, in July 2008. They have four children: a daughter born in 2009, a son born in 2011, a daughter born in 2013, and a son born in 2016.

Newsom is the godfather of designer, model, and LGBTQ rights activist Nats Getty. According to James Reginato's Growing Up Getty, the Newsoms, Harrises, Pelosis, and Gettys are godparents to one another's children and make appearances at important family events.

== Works ==
- Newsom, Gavin; Dickey, Lisa (February 7, 2013). Citizenville: How to Take the Town Square Digital and Reinvent Government. Penguin. ISBN 978-1101605813.
- Newsom, Gavin (February 24, 2026). Young Man in a Hurry: A Memoir of Discovery. Penguin. ISBN 978-1984881939.

== See also ==
- Electoral history of Gavin Newsom

== Notes ==
Political offices
Preceded by Willie Brown	Mayor of San Francisco; 2004–2011	Succeeded by Ed Lee
Preceded by Abel Maldonado	Lieutenant Governor of California; 2011–2019	Succeeded by Eleni Kounalakis
Preceded by Jerry Brown	Governor of California; 2019–present	Incumbent
Party political offices
Preceded by John Garamendi	Democratic nominee for Lieutenant Governor of California; 2010, 2014	Succeeded by Eleni Kounalakis
Preceded by Jerry Brown	Democratic nominee for Governor of California; 2018, 2022	Succeeded by Xavier Becerra
U.S. order of precedence (ceremonial)
Preceded by JD Vance as Vice President	Order of precedence of the United States; Within California	Succeeded by Mayor of city in which event is held
Preceded by JD Vance as Vice President	Order of precedence of the United States; Within California	Succeeded by Otherwise Mike Johnson as Speaker of the House
Preceded by Tony Evers as Governor of Wisconsin	Order of precedence of the United States; Outside California	Succeeded by Tim Walz as Governor of Minnesota
