= Reproductive Freedom Alliance =

U.S interstate gubernatorial agreement

The Reproductive Freedom Alliance is an interstate gubernatorial alliance announced in 2023 to defend the right to abortion and reproductive freedoms. Major funding for the alliance is provided by the California Wellness Foundation with additional support from the Rosenberg Foundation.

The alliance currently has 22 governor members. The alliance is a non-binding organization, in which membership is indicated and supported by state executive orders enacted by participating governors rather than an interstate compact or trigger law passed by state legislatures.

The Reproductive Freedom Alliance submitted an amicus brief to the US Supreme Court opposing more restrictions on mifepristone.

The alliance is a project of GovAct.

== Signatories ==
- Arizona Governor Katie Hobbs
- California Governor Gavin Newsom
- Colorado Governor Jared Polis
- Connecticut Governor Ned Lamont
- Delaware Governor John Carney
- Guam Governor Lou Leon Guerrero
- Hawai’i Governor Josh Green
- Illinois Governor J. B. Pritzker
- Maine Governor Janet Mills
- Maryland Governor Wes Moore
- Massachusetts Governor Maura Healey
- Michigan Governor Gretchen Whitmer
- Minnesota Governor Tim Walz
- New Jersey Governor Phil Murphy,
- New Mexico Governor Michelle Lujan Grisham,
- New York Governor Kathy Hochul
- North Carolina Governor Roy Cooper,
- Oregon Governor Tina Kotek
- Pennsylvania Governor Josh Shapiro
- Rhode Island Governor Daniel McKee
- Washington Governor Jay Inslee
- Wisconsin Governor Tony Evers
