= California Senate Bill 41 (2025) =

California Senate Bill 41 (SB 41) is a 2025 California statute which regulates pharmacy benefit managers (PBMs). Authored by Senator Scott Wiener, the bill was signed into law by Governor Gavin Newsom on October 11, 2025.

== Legislative history ==
In 2021, Newsom vetoed SB 524, authored by Senator Nancy Skinner, which would have prohibited patient steering to certain pharmacies by health plans, health insurers, and their agents. In 2024, Wiener authored SB 966 which, in addition to prohibiting patient steering, would have required PBMs to be licensed through the state government. On September 28, 2024, Newsom vetoed SB 966, arguing that his administration already took steps to bring down the cost of prescription drugs as well as that an existing state office had a mandate to review the market effects of health care consolidation. In addition, he sought more "granular information" about the influence of PBMs before signing any legislation to regulate them through the state.

Wiener reintroduced the bill for the 2025 session, but was informed by Newsom's administration that provisions in his bill mandating the licensure of PBMs through the state government would be incorporated into the state budget trailer bills.
