= Citizenville =

2013 book by Gavin Newsom

Citizenville: How to Take the Town Square Digital and Reinvent Government
- Author: Gavin Newsom with Lisa Dickey
- Publisher: Penguin Books
- Publication date: February 7, 2013
- Publication place: United States
- ISBN: 1594204721
- OCLC: 796756047

Citizenville: How to Take the Town Square Digital and Reinvent Government is a 2013 book by California lieutenant governor Gavin Newsom. It describes how ordinary citizens can use new digital tools to dissolve political gridlock and transform American democracy.
