= KHSU =

Public radio station in Arcata, California, United States

- Arcata, California; United States
- Broadcast area: North Coast
- Frequency: 90.5 MHz (HD Radio)

Programming
- Format: Public radio

Ownership
- Owner: California State Polytechnic University, Humboldt
- Operator: Capital Public Radio

History
- Founded: 1947, as a carrier current station
- First air date: October 17, 1960
- Former call signs: KHSC (1960–1972)
- Former frequencies: 91.5 MHz (1982–1984)
- Call sign meaning: Humboldt State University, former name of Cal Poly Humboldt

Technical information
- Licensing authority: FCC
- Facility ID: 28111
- Class: C1
- ERP: 8,500 watts
- HAAT: 459 metres (1,506 feet)
- Transmitter coordinates: 40°43′37″N 123°58′22″W
- Repeater: See § Program services and transmitters

Links
- Public license information: Public file; LMS
- Webcast: Ways To Listen
- Website: KHSU

KHSU (90.5 FM) is an NPR-member radio station, licensed to Arcata, California, United States. The station is currently owned by California State Polytechnic University, Humboldt. KHSU also holds licenses for additional stations running Radio Bilingüe and the BBC World Service.

KHSU provides the region encompassing Humboldt and Del Norte counties in California as well as portions of Trinity and Mendocino counties in California and Curry County, Oregon, with news, information and entertainment from public radio producers like National Public Radio (NPR), Public Radio International (PRI) and American Public Media (APM).

== History ==
=== Early years ===
The station began as a radio classroom experiment in 1941 on the campus of what was then Humboldt State College, with broadcasts airing on KIEM for two months until the attack on Pearl Harbor. The radio program resumed in full in 1947, when KHSC signed on as a 10-watt carrier current station.

In January 1960, Humboldt State applied for the first non-commercial radio license on a California college or university campus. The new station signed on for the first time on October 17, operating at 10 watts on 90.5 FM. It became KHSU in 1972, shortly after Humboldt State was elevated to university status.

=== NPR membership ===
The station remained almost exclusively a student training ground until 1982, when it boosted its power to 100 watts and moved to 91.5 FM. At that point, the station began a gradual process of professionalization, picking up an NPR membership in 1984. It returned to 90.5 in October 1984, this time with an increased signal of 9,000 watts.

In 1988, facing the prospect of waiting five years to qualify for grants from the Corporation for Public Broadcasting, KHSU shuffled its budget in order to enable it to hire the five full-time employees it needed for CPB funding within only five months of applying.

=== 2019 staff cutbacks ===
On April 11, 2019, KHSU took a dramatic change in focus, personnel, and programming. All staff and volunteers were called to a 9 a.m. meeting, at which the memo below was given to those present, essentially firing of all but two staffers, though both later resigned. HSU administrators then enlisted HSU police officers to escort all those involved off campus. Door locks were changed, the station office was closed and phones disconnected, and KHSU began re-broadcasting programming from North State Public Radio in Chico, California. Volunteers, listeners, legislators and faculty members disagreed with HSU administrators' cutbacks, taken just a few days after a successful Fund Drive with no mention of the pending staff cuts. Subsequently, in 2021 HSU signed an agreement with Capital Public Radio, as NSPR was rendered a shell after CapRadio's operational takeover in 2020. NSPR currently operates KHSU stations from its offices in Chico.

== Program services and transmitters ==
In addition to its main program service, KHSU offers the BBC World Service on two transmitters and Radio Bilingüe on one transmitter. These stations are not managed by CapRadio.

Rebroadcasters of KHSU
Call sign	Frequency	City of license	Facility ID	ERP (W)	HAAT	Class	Transmitter coordinates
KHSG	89.9 FM	Garberville	172843	75	779 m (2,556 ft)	A	40°07′11.5″N 123°41′34.1″W
KHSR	91.9 FM	Crescent City	28112	4,500	−59 m (−194 ft)	B	41°45′34.4″N 124°11′32.3″W
K204GA	88.7 FM	Ferndale, etc.	34543	170	—	D	
K260BQ	99.9 FM	Willow Creek	34544	56	—	D	

KHSU-BBC transmitters
Call sign	Frequency	City of license	Facility ID	ERP (W)	HAAT	Class	Transmitter coordinates
KHSF	89.9 FM	Ferndale	172798	300	538 m (1,765 ft)	A	40°30′2.4″N 124°17′10.1″W
KHSQ	107.7 FM	Trinidad	164090	1,000	479 m (1,572 ft)	B	40°58′41″N 124°00′40″W

KHSU-Radio Bilingüe transmitters
Call sign	Frequency	City of license	Facility ID	ERP (W)	HAAT	Class	Transmitter coordinates
KHSM	103.3 FM	McKinleyville	172798	184514	258 m (846 ft)	C3	41°05′57″N 124°07′37″W
