= California Social Housing Act =

The California Social Housing Act is a proposed California bill to establish an independent statewide housing authority, known as the California Housing Authority, to acquire land for, develop, own and maintain public housing. The bill is authored by Alex Lee and was first introduced to the 2021–2022 session of the California State Legislature. In the 2023–24 session, the bill was passed by the legislature, but was vetoed by Governor Gavin Newsom on budgetary grounds. Lee re-introduced the bill in the 2025–26 session.

== Background ==
Multiple laws have been passed since 2010 to preempt local zoning laws and ease private developments of housing and reduce the statewide housing shortage, especially under the governorships of Jerry Brown and Gavin Newsom. Several of these laws contain mandates and incentives for private development of affordable or subsidized housing.

The proposal for a statewide housing authority was inspired by the models for social housing in Singapore and Vienna, Austria.

== Provisions ==
The Social Housing Act would define social housing as all housing owned by a government entity such as the California Housing Authority, a public entity or a local housing authority, and made available to a range of household incomes ranging from extremely low income to above moderate income. It would create the California Housing Authority as an independent state body tasked to acquire land for, develop, own and maintain public housing. The Authority would be headed by a Board consisting of both members appointed by selected government officials as well as members elected by residents of social housing developments. The bill would require the Authority to employ two separate leasing models - the rental model and ownership model, and would prohibit the Authority from selling

The bill would require the Authority to prioritize acquisition or re-acquisition of the following parcels:

- excess state-owned parcels
- parcels near transit
- Underutilized parcels or redevelopment of underutilized parcels with affordability covenants or rent-controlled units
- Parcels at risk of becoming unaffordable or at the end of their affordability covenants
- Parcels with affordability covenants or rent control units in danger of losing affordability status

== Legislative history ==
=== Initial versions ===
The bill (AB 387) was first introduced in 2021 to define social housing and create a California Social Housing Council as an advisory body within the California Business, Consumer Services and Housing Agency. The bill died in the Assembly Committee on Housing and Community Development. In 2022, the bill (AB 2053) was significantly expanded to establish a California Housing Authority and was passed in the Assembly but died in the Senate Governance and Finance Committee.

=== AB 309 (2023) ===
The 2023 version (AB 309) originally retained most of the language of the 2022 version, but was significantly amended in committee to remove the provisions regarding the Housing Authority, instead establishing a Social Housing Program in the California Department of General Services. The revision would have allowed local governments to propose or revise proposed objective design standards for housing while prohibiting local governments from denying approval of developments authorized under the program. The bill was passed with amendments by the Senate on September 14, 2023, and was concurred by the Assembly on the same day.

Newsom vetoed AB 309 on October 7, 2023. In his veto message, Newsom cited his signature of SB 561 and AB 2233 to codify a 2019 executive order requiring the California Department of General Services to create a digitized inventory of excess state-owned properties and collaborate with the HCD and CalHFA to identify sites on state-owned parcels available for affordable housing. He also cited the potential cost of capital expenditures, and objected to the provision allowing local government review of proposed developments.

=== Later bills ===
The bill was reintroduced in its original 2022 form in 2024 (AB 2881) and was supported in the Assembly Committee on Housing and Community Development, but died in the Assembly Appropriations Committee. The bill was reintroduced in 2025 (AB 11).

== Related legislation ==
=== SB 555 (2025) ===
Another bill, the Stable Affordable Housing Act of 2023 (SB 555, Wahab), was signed into law by Newsom on October 7, 2023. The law requires the Department of Housing and Community Development to complete a California Social Housing Study by December 31, 2026.
