= PlumpJack Winery =

Winery in Oakville, California, US

Coordinates: 38°27′20″N 122°22′27″W

PlumpJack Estate Winery
- Location: Oakville, California, US
- Appellation: Oakville AVA
- Founded: 1995
- First vintage: 1995
- Key people: Gavin Newsom, founder; Gordon Getty, founder; John Conover, general manager; Aaron Miller, winemaker
- Parent company: PlumpJack Collection of Wineries, PlumpJack Group
- Cases/yr: 12,500
- Known for: Reserve Cabernet Sauvignon
- Varietals: Cabernet Sauvignon, Chardonnay, Merlot, Syrah
- Distribution: United States
- Tasting: Open to public
- Website: https://plumpjackwinery.com/

PlumpJack Estate Winery is a boutique winery in Oakville, California, specializing in premium Cabernet Sauvignon wines. PlumpJack was the first winery in Napa Valley to use screw caps as a closure on fine wines. It is one of four wineries operated by the PlumpJack Collection of Wineries.

The name of the winery is inspired by "the roguish spirit of Shakespeare's Sir John Falstaff (Henry IV), dubbed Plump Jack by Queen Elizabeth."

== History ==
The PlumpJack Group was founded in 1992 by Gavin Newsom, a San Francisco entrepreneur and future governor of California, and Gordon Getty, a San Francisco composer and philanthropist. They opened a wine store called PlumpJack Wines in the Fillmore neighborhood of San Francisco. Over the next five years, the business expanded to include a boutique hotel and three restaurants. PlumpJack Estate Winery was founded in 1995 on a century-old 47 acres (19 ha) vineyard in Napa Valley on Oakville Cross Road. The winery facility and tasting room were designed by Leavitt-Weaver, the same design firm that the PlumpJack Group used for the designs of its restaurants and hotels.

PlumpJack Estate Winery was the first winery to use the Stelvin screw cap closure on its most expensive bottling. John Conover, general manager of the winery, announced at the 2000 Napa Valley Wine Auction that half (150 cases) of PlumpJack's 1997 Reserve Cabernet Sauvignon would be available upon release with a screw cap, and that those bottles would cost $10 more than those in the cases closed with cork. At $135 per bottle, many in the wine industry were skeptical of the decision. As part of the screw cap program at PlumpJack, bottles with the screw cap closure from each vintage since 1997 have been analyzed by researchers in the Department of Viticulture and Enology at the University of California, Davis.

== Wines ==
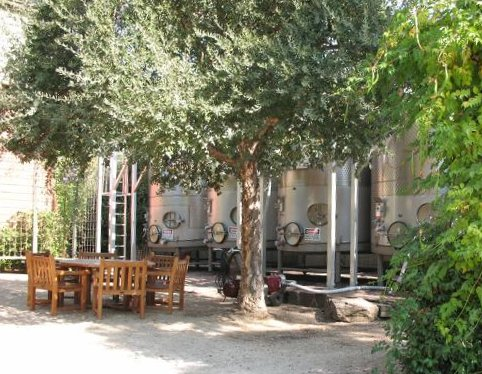
Vats at PlumpJack Estate Winery

PlumpJack Estate Winery produces Cabernet Sauvignon and Chardonnay varietal wines from Napa Valley grapes, with smaller amounts of Merlot, and Syrah. The 2001 PlumpJack Estate Cabernet Sauvignon was named 2004 Wine of the Year by Wine Enthusiast magazine. The 2002 and 2004 vintages of the PlumpJack Reserve Cabernet Sauvignon both received "Extraordinary" wine ratings of 96-100 points from wine critic Robert Parker.

Winemaker Aaron Miller became the head winemaker for PlumpJack in 2012. Under Miller's tenure, PlumpJack's flagship Reserve Cabernet Sauvignon has received multiple 100-point scores from wine critics, including Robert Parker's Wine Advocate and Lisa Perrotti-Brown.
