= KUOP =

CapRadio public radio station in Stockton, California

- Stockton, California; United States
- Broadcast area: Central Valley
- Frequency: 91.3 MHz
- Branding: CapRadio

Programming
- Format: Public radio
- Network: CapRadio
- Affiliations: NPR, PRX

Ownership
- Owner: California State University, Sacramento

History
- First air date: September 22, 1947
- Former call signs: KCVN (1947–1963)
- Call sign meaning: University of the Pacific

Technical information
- Licensing authority: FCC
- Facility ID: 69157
- Class: B
- ERP: 7,000 watts
- HAAT: 372 meters (1,220 ft)
- Transmitter coordinates: 37°28′48″N 121°21′02″W
- Translator: 96.7 K244DV (Merced)

Links
- Public license information: Public file; LMS
- Webcast: Listen live
- Website: capradio.org

KUOP (91.3 FM) is an NPR member radio station licensed to Stockton, California, United States. The station is currently owned by California State University, Sacramento and is part of the news network of CapRadio (formerly Capital Public Radio).

From 1947 to 2000, KUOP was the radio station of the University of the Pacific. Capital Public Radio began leasing out KUOP's air time in 2000 and bought the facility outright in 2007.

== History ==
=== KCVN ===
The College of the Pacific applied to build a new FM radio station on December 9, 1944. The Federal Communications Commission approved the application on June 27, 1946, and KCVN began broadcasting on September 22, 1947, at 7 p.m. (The KCOP call letters were held by a police facility in Texas which showed no interest in giving them up.) While KCVN was the first broadcasting facility operated by the college, Pacific had a lengthy history in radio. Under director John Crabbe, it established the second radio major in the United States in 1927, and students on the campus could listen to carrier current outlet KAEO, which had been put into service by the Alpha Epsilon Omicron radio fraternity in January 1947. The college also aired programs live over KWG and sent transcriptions to stations in Lodi and Modesto.

KCVN's first transmissions were made using an antenna mounted to a 90-foot (27 m) pole while a 300-foot (91 m) tower was commissioned. The station operated for four hours a day, six days a week, from a converted quonset hut.

=== Becoming KUOP ===
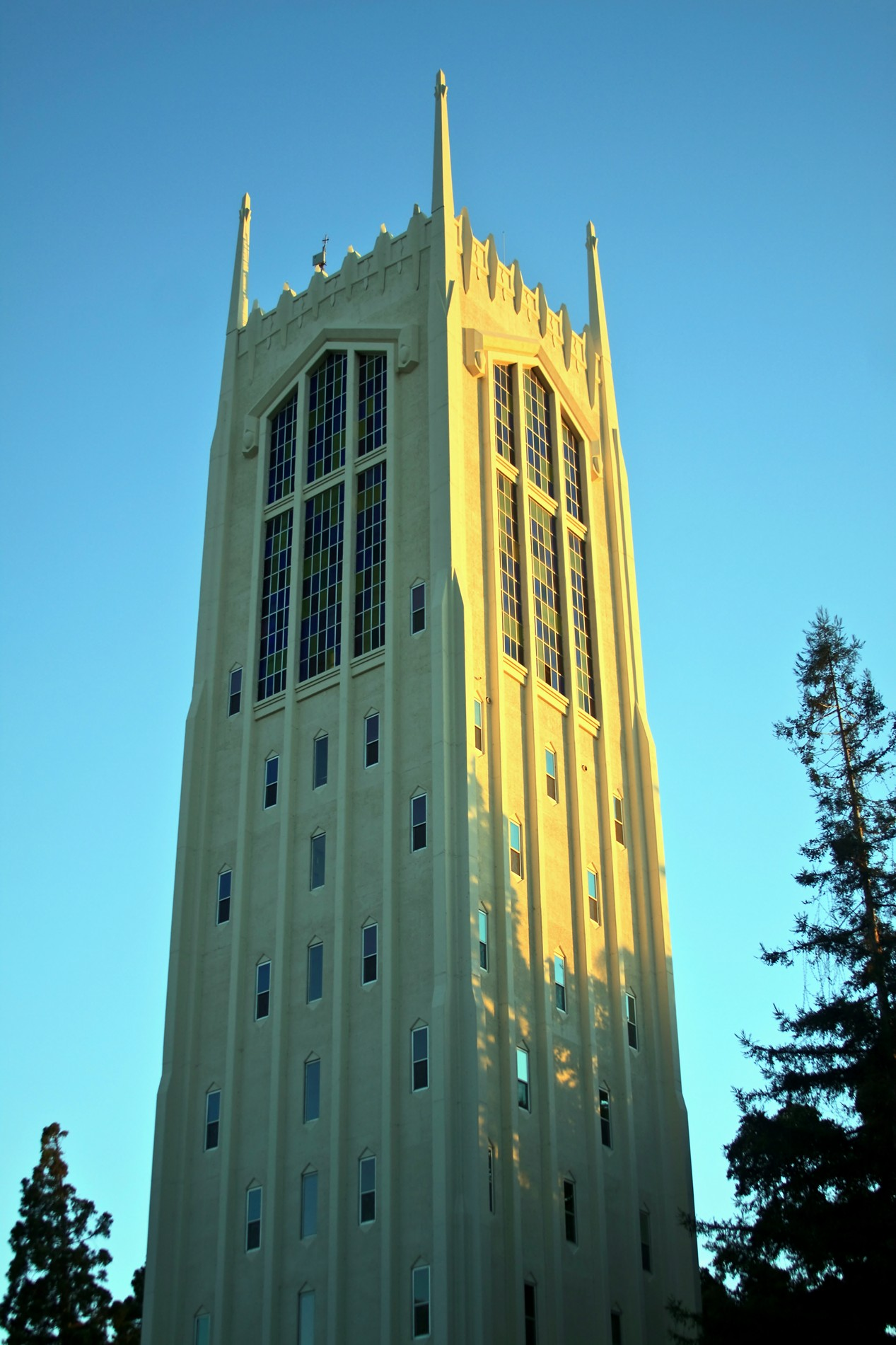
KUOP moved in 1964 to the Burns Tower (pictured)

In 1961, the College of the Pacific renamed itself to the University of the Pacific, and KCVN became KUOP on April 12, 1963. Later that year, UOP applied to increase the effective radiated power of the station from 3,400 watts to nearly 30,000; at the same time, the station was relocated to the 9th and top floor the new Robert E. Burns Tower — a combination office building and water tank. KUOP received a donation of multiplex equipment allowing it to broadcast in stereo for the first time and making it the first stereo college station on the West Coast.

KUOP received a $15,000 grant from the Corporation for Public Broadcasting in 1971, allowing it to expand its daytime service; that year, the station also joined the startup National Public Radio network. (It thus got NPR before Sacramento, which did not have an NPR station until 1979; NPR aired an entire week of All Things Considered from KUOP in the run-up to the 1976 presidential election.) A major growth step was taken in 1982 when the station filed to move its transmitter to Mount Oso and thereby provide the first public radio service to 300,000 additional people in four counties; the move took place in 1983.

The station also developed a significant number of specialty programs, particularly in jazz music. Vince Marino's Dixieland My Beat aired for a quarter-century on KUOP until his death in 1993 and was credited with popularizing the genre in the region.

=== Enter Capital Public Radio ===
Despite its popularity with listeners in Stockton, KUOP was a money-loser for the University of the Pacific. As early as 1973, budget cuts threatened the station's existence. In the mid-1990s, KUOP cut back on some of its local programming and began airing more national NPR fare. By 2000, however, KUOP, along with most of the university's auxiliary services, operated at a loss; the station recorded annual deficits sometimes exceeding $300,000 and had been subsidized by the UOP general fund for more than a decade. In August 1998, in an attempt to boost funding, KUOP radically changed its music format from classical to Americana and increased its talk output, a move that drew the ire of some listeners and did not bring in enough new fundraising dollars to offset the support that was lost.

On May 30, 2000, KUOP and Capital Public Radio of Sacramento announced that the University of the Pacific would enter into an agreement for CPR to take over operations of the Stockton station. CPR slowly brought KUOP's schedule in line with its other stations, including eliminating bluegrass and folk music. When the University of the Pacific board put the license up for sale in 2005, CPR attempted to buy the station outright, holding off a rival bid from KQED; however, at that time, the university opted not to sell. Ultimately, CPR bought the license outright from the University of the Pacific for $4 million in 2007; the university continued to provide a campus studio facility for CPR's use.
