= KHSQ =

Coordinates: 40.978°N 124.011°W

- Trinidad, California; United States
- Broadcast area: Eureka, California
- Frequency: 107.7 MHz

Programming
- Format: Spanish
- Network: Radio Bilingüe

Ownership
- Owner: California State Polytechnic University, Humboldt

History
- First air date: 2016 (as KBAE at 95.5)
- Former call signs: KZCC (2006–2011); KBAE (2011–2018)
- Former frequencies: 95.5 MHz (2016–2018)

Technical information
- Licensing authority: FCC
- Facility ID: 164090
- Class: C3
- ERP: 1,000 watts
- HAAT: 479 meters

Links
- Public license information: Public file; LMS
- Webcast: Listen Live
- Website: KHSQ Online

KHSQ is a radio station licensed to Trinidad, California, that broadcasts on 107.7 FM from the campus of California State Polytechnic University, Humboldt in Arcata. As KBAE, the station previously aired a hot adult contemporary music format branded as "95.5 The Bay", on its previous 95.5 MHz frequency. Prior to January 31, 2011, the station went by the KZCC calls. Cal Poly Humboldt now operates the station as a non-commercial public station.

The station went dark at midnight on June 30, 2017, and in August began broadcasting as a Spanish-language station administered by Cal Poly Humboldt's radio station KHSU, airing programming from the Radio Bilingüe network. A sale of the station by Airen Broadcasting to Humboldt State for $70,000 was consummated on January 16, 2018, with funding provided by California foundations interested in providing programming for Spanish-speaking residents of the North Coast. On January 29, 2018, the station changed its call sign to KHSQ. Effective April 30, 2018, KHSQ was licensed to move its signal from 95.5 MHz to 107.7 MHz.
