= North State Public Radio =

Public radio broadcaster in Northern California, United States

KCHO and KFPR
KCHO: Chico, California; KFPR: Redding, California; United States
- Broadcast area: Northern California
- Frequencies: KCHO: 91.7 MHz; KFPR: 88.9 MHz
- Branding: North State Public Radio

Programming
- Format: Public radio
- Affiliations: NPR

Ownership
- Owner: California State University, Chico

History
- First air date: KCHO: April 22, 1969; KFPR: November 17, 1994
- Call sign meaning: KCHO: Chico; KFPR: Public Radio

Technical information
- Licensing authority: FCC
- Facility ID: KCHO: 68938; KFPR: 66567
- Class: KCHO: B; KFPR: C1
- ERP: KCHO: 7,700 watts; KFPR: 750 watts
- HAAT: KCHO: 372 meters (1,220 ft); KFPR: 1,091 meters (3,579 ft)
- Transmitter coordinates: KCHO: 39°57′30″N 121°42′48″W; KFPR: 40°36′10″N 122°38′38″W
- Translator(s): See § Translators

Links
- Public license information: KCHO: Public file; LMS; KFPR: Public file; LMS
- Webcast: Listen live
- Website: mynspr.org

North State Public Radio (NSPR, KCHO 91.7 Chico/KFPR 88.9 Redding) is an NPR-affiliated public radio broadcaster which has main stations in the Northern California cities of Redding and Chico. It airs news and public affairs, classical music, talk radio and jazz programs. With the help of a number of relay transmitters, NSPR's signal covers a large portion of the North State region, including the cities of Red Bluff, Oroville, Paradise, Anderson, and Shasta Lake City.

In 2020, Capital Public Radio, which operates KXJZ and KXPR, took over day-to-day operations of the station under a public service operating agreement.

== Programming ==
Programming produced by North State Public Radio includes gardening show Cultivating Place and science show Blue Dot.

== Translators ==
In addition to the main stations, KCHO and KFPR are relayed by additional translators to widen their broadcast area.

Broadcast translators for KFPR
Call sign	Frequency	City of license	FID	ERP (W)	Class	FCC info
K220EB	91.9 FM	Burney, California	66612	10	D	LMS
K222BR	92.3 FM	Dunsmuir, California	66602	10	D	LMS

Broadcast translators for KCHO
Call sign	Frequency	City of license	FID	ERP (W)	Class	FCC info
K209AY	89.7 FM	Chester, California	66556	9	D	LMS
K252AL	98.3 FM	Chester, California	1118	9	D	LMS
K265AA	100.9 FM	Chester, California	1116	25	D	LMS
K259AW	99.7 FM	Hayfork, California	68937	10	D	LMS
K222AQ	92.3 FM	Oroville, California	148348	250	D	LMS
K208BJ	89.5 FM	Weaverville, California	71378	76	D	LMS

== See also ==
- Campus radio
- List of college radio stations in the United States
