= John Peter Pelissero =

John P. Pelissero (born 1953) is a Political Scientist and Government Ethics Scholar located in the Chicago metropolitan area. Prior to his retirement in June 2025, he served as Director of Government Ethics at the Markkula Center for Applied Ethics of Santa Clara University. Pelissero is professor emeritus of political science at Loyola University Chicago, where he served on the faculty for 35 years. He was Provost and Chief Academic Officer of Loyola University Chicago from 2010 to 2018. He also served as Loyola's Interim President from July 1, 2015, to July 31, 2016. Pelissero's other Loyola experience includes service as chairperson of the Department of Political Science from 1999 to 2002, associate provost for curriculum development from 2003 to 2005, and vice provost in the Division of Academic Affairs from 2005 to 2010.

Pelissero earned his B.A. in political science from Marquette University in 1975. He holds an M.A. (Political Science) and M.P.A. from the University of Oklahoma. He received his Ph.D. in Political Science from the University of Oklahoma in 1983, and served on the faculty of Texas A&M University from 1983 until 1985. He specializes in urban politics, American Politics, public management, and higher education.

He has published dozens of articles in political science journals and books that include: Voting for Ethics, Second edition, Palmetto Publishing, 2024 (with Ann G. Skeet and Hana S. Callaghan); Managing Urban America, 8th ed., Washington: CQ Press, 2016, (with Robert E. England and David R. Morgan) and Cities, Politics and Policy: A Comparative Analysis. Washington: CQ Press, 2003. Managing Urban America was published in Chinese in the Public Administration and Public Management Classics collection by China Renmin University Press in 2016. See also:
