= CapRadio =

Public radio service in Sacramento, California

- Industry: Mass media
- Genre: Public radio broadcasting
- Founded: 1964
- Headquarters: Sacramento, California, US
- Brands: KXJZ, KXPR
- Revenue: 10,683,927 United States dollar (2017)
- Total assets: 40,472,565 United States dollar (2022)
- Owner: California State University, Sacramento
- Website: Official website

CapRadio (Capital Public Radio) is the public radio service of California State University, Sacramento. It consists of two full-power stations and five repeaters, all members of National Public Radio. It is the NPR member for Sacramento and much of the surrounding area, including Stockton and Modesto.

The group is headquartered on Folsom Boulevard on the Sacramento State campus. CapRadio also operates North State Public Radio serving the northern Sacramento Valley, and KHSU serving the North Coast, under operating agreements.

== Stations ==
KXJZ (90.9 FM) in Sacramento airs news and talk programming from NPR, as well as jazz and blues programming on weekends. KXJZ's programming is repeated on KUOP in Stockton at 91.3 FM, KKTO in Tahoe City at 90.5 FM, and KQNC in Quincy at 88.1 FM. KKTO's signal also reaches Reno and Carson City, Nevada, giving much of northern Nevada a second choice for NPR programming alongside that area's flagship station, KUNR.

KXPR (88.9 FM) in Sacramento airs mostly classical music programming, and Opera along with blues and jazz on weeknights and Sundays. It is also Sacramento's home for Live From Here (formerly A Prairie Home Companion). KXPR's programming is repeated on KXSR in Groveland at 91.7 FM (serving the central Sierra Nevada) and KXJS in Sutter at 88.7 FM.

== History ==
Capital Public Radio traces its roots to KERS, a student radio station that signed on from Sacramento State in 1964. The 10-watt station grew in power to 5,000 watts by the late 1960s. However, a decade later, Sacramento was still without a public radio station, and Sacramento State embarked on a campaign to transform KERS into such an outlet. On April 2, 1979, KXPR signed on at 88.9 FM airing a mix of classical music, jazz, and NPR news programming. It originally operated at 20,000 watts. In 1984, it moved to 90.9 FM from a new, more powerful transmitter, operating at 50,000 watts. By 1985, it was the eighth most listened-to NPR station in the country.

Amid the expansion of NPR's schedule in the 1980s, Sacramento State sought and was granted a second station. That station, KXJZ, signed on in 1991 at 88.9 FM. By 1996, it had taken all NPR news programming from KXPR. The first full-power satellite, KXSR, signed on in 1992. KKTO followed in 1996, taking over from a low-powered translator that had operated from South Lake Tahoe since 1985.

In 2006, KXPR and KXJZ swapped frequencies. KXJZ moved to 90.9, while KXPR returned to 88.9.
