= KXPR =

Public classical music station in Sacramento, California

Coordinates: 38.2735°N 121.5041°W

Sacramento, California; United States
- Broadcast area: Sacramento metropolitan area
- Frequency: 88.9 MHz (HD Radio)
- Branding: 88.9 KXPR

Programming
- Format: Classical
- Affiliations: National Public Radio

Ownership
- Owner: California State University, Sacramento
- Sister stations: KXJZ

History
- First air date: January 24, 1979
- Former frequencies: 91.5 MHz (1979–1984); 90.9 MHz (1984–2006)
- Call sign meaning: Excellence in Public Radio

Technical information
- Licensing authority: FCC
- Facility ID: 8358
- Class: B
- ERP: 50,000 watts
- HAAT: 97 meters (318 ft)
- Repeaters: 88.7 KXJS (Sutter); 91.7 KXSR (Groveland/Sonora); 90.9 KXJZ-HD2 (Sacramento)

Links
- Public license information: Public file; LMS
- Webcast: Listen live
- Website: capradio.org

KXPR (88.9 FM) is a non-commercial radio station licensed to Sacramento, California, United States, airing a classical music format. Along with sister station KXJZ 90.9 FM, they are known as Capital Public Radio or "CapRadio." Both stations are owned by California State University, Sacramento (Sacramento State), and share studios along Folsom Boulevard on campus.

KXPR's transmitter is sited on Eagles Nest Road at Florin Road in Rancho Cordova. Programming is simulcast on 91.7 KXSR in Groveland-Sonora and on 88.7 KXJS in Sutter-Yuba City. While KXPR broadcasts using HD Radio technology, it has no HD2 or HD3 digital subchannels.

== History ==
The station signed on the air on January 24, 1979. At the time, the call sign was KYDS, owned by the San Juan Unified School District. It allowed students considering a career in broadcasting to host shows and learn about radio. It broadcast on 91.5 MHz and was powered at only 300 watts, a fraction of its current output. The station moved to 90.9 MHz in 1984.

Eventually it was acquired by Capital Public Radio. At that time, CapRadio owned only one station, 88.9 KXJZ, which had a mixed schedule with NPR news and information programming along with classical and jazz music. CapRadio acquired the second station so one could concentrate on news and the other could provide classical and jazz music around the clock. In 2006, the stations swapped signals to their current configuration.

KXPR's powerful signal of 50,000 watts can reach both the Sacramento and Stockton areas fairly easily as the location of its transmitter is about 10 miles (16 km) from Sacramento and 35 miles (56 km) from Stockton. KXPR is also heard on rebroadcaster stations in the Yuba City area on 88.7 KXJS and in the Central Sierra on 91.7 KXSR.

== Programming ==
Most of the day, KXPR broadcasts classical music. On weekday and Sunday evenings, it airs jazz. And on weekends, there are specialty shows including The Thistle and Shamrock, Sunday Baroque and From The Top. Metropolitan Opera broadcasts are heard on Saturday afternoons in season. KXPR is a member station of NPR.

== Past shows ==
Past shows from KXPR's schedule included At the Opera with host Sean Bianco, Sound and Spirit with host Ellen Kushner, Harmonia (with the accent on the third of four syllables), and Musical Stages .
