= KXJZ =

CapRadio public radio station in Sacramento, California

- Sacramento, California; United States
- Broadcast area: Greater Sacramento
- Frequency: 90.9 MHz (HD Radio)
- Branding: CapRadio

Programming
- Format: Public Radio and talk
- Subchannels: HD2: Classical music (KXPR)
- Affiliations: NPR; PRX; APM; BBC World Service

Ownership
- Owner: California State University, Sacramento
- Sister stations: KXPR

History
- First air date: October 5, 1964
- Former call signs: KERS (1964–1978); KXPR (1978–2006)
- Former frequencies: 88.9 MHz (1964–1967, 1979–1984); 90.7 MHz (1967–1978)
- Call sign meaning: "Excellence in Jazz"

Technical information
- Licensing authority: FCC
- Facility ID: 8336
- Class: B
- ERP: 50,000 watts
- HAAT: 147 meters (482 ft)
- Transmitter coordinates: 38.710°N 121.483°W
- Repeaters: 88.1 KQNC (Quincy); 90.5 KKTO (Tahoe City/Reno); 91.3 KUOP (Stockton)

Links
- Public license information: Public file; LMS
- Webcast: Listen live
- Website: capradio.org

KXJZ (90.9 FM) is a noncommercial educational radio station licensed to Sacramento, California, United States. It airs programming from National Public Radio (NPR) and other public radio producers and distributors, as well as locally produced news and public affairs programs. It also offers a continuous 24-hour commercial-free classical music radio format on its HD2 subcarrier. KXJZ's sister station in Sacramento is KXPR (88.9 FM), which broadcasts classical music and a few non-classical programs at the weekend. The two stations are known as CapRadio (formerly Capital Public Radio). Both stations are owned by Sacramento State and share studio operations on campus, and KXJZ's transmitter is located near Rio Linda.

KXJZ operates on the older of the two frequencies, which had been established in 1964 as KERS, a student-run station at Sacramento State. In 1978, KERS went silent as it converted to a public radio station as KXPR, which began operations April 2, 1979. In 2006, KXPR and KXJZ (88.9 FM) swapped frequencies. KXJZ's NPR news programming is also available on three high-power repeaters and three low-power translators in California and northern Nevada.

== History ==
=== KERS ===
On April 21, 1964, Sacramento State College applied for a new noncommercial radio station to broadcast with 10 watts at 88.9 MHz; Dr. Howard Martin had been the primary exponent for a radio station on campus. The Federal Communications Commission approved the application on June 17, and KERS began broadcasting October 5. Initially broadcasting seven hours a day, students produced most of the programming on the new outlet; it also aired taped lectures from faculty and other cultural programs.

Sacramento State applied in 1967 to increase KERS's effective radiated power to 5,350 watts and move to 90.7 MHz; the FCC approved the change on June 22, 1967, and the new facility was activated in April 1968. Also installed at this time were a second production room, more offices and a wire service hookup. It had nearly doubled its output, being on air 95 hours a week; notable features included the telecast of all Sacramento State basketball games, home and away, as well as music recitals from the campus. By 1971, KERS's musical programming was largely progressive rock and jazz.

KERS's most notable moment would come on April 30, 1971, when student reporter Rosemarie King broke a bombshell story on her newscast: that Governor Ronald Reagan had not paid any state income tax in 1970. The revelation spread and forced Reagan to admit its veracity; it also prompted a state tax board agent to interview King, hoping to learn more about the leak, but the journalist refused to divulge her source. Her actions resulted in a commendation from two regions of Sigma Delta Chi. King would later be hired by Nancy Pelosi as her top aide when she took over the California Democratic Party in 1981 and later served as the party's executive director and as a consultant.

=== From campus to public ===
Sacramento did not have a public radio station of its own, and in the late 1970s, Sacramento State pursued a strategy to transform KERS into a public station for the Sacramento Valley. Several federal grants were obtained to hire new staff and to upgrade the facility, moving to 90.9 MHz at higher power from the KTXL tower in Walnut Grove; KTXL donated the tower space. Additionally, KERS suffered from budget constraints and community pressure related to its alternative programming.

That July, KERS left the air. (Sacramento State students would later get a carrier-current and online student radio station in 1991.) After McClatchy-owned KAER (92.5 FM), the former KFBK-FM which wished to exit the classical format, donated its classical music library and $5,000 to Sacramento State, the station reemerged as KXPR on April 2, 1979, on its new frequency of 88.9 MHz.

The new facility, however, had several problems with its signal, particularly in cars, prompting the station to pursue a transmitter relocation to Elk Grove and a frequency change to 90.9 MHz. The tower was to be shared with KAER and KXOA-FM 107.7, but a series of contractual delays prompted the shared site to be shelved; instead, KXPR built its own tower at a cost of $400,000. The new site was activated in November 1984.

In 1985, translators of KXPR were activated at Davis and South Lake Tahoe; the KXPR studios were relocated in December to a new site on American River Drive. That year, the station ranked eighth out of 257 public radio outlets in listenership.

KXPR operated on reduced power for 30 days during 1986 after flooding put the transmitter building under four feet of water and damaged the equipment; the station temporarily broadcast from the Sacramento Bee tower downtown. In the wake of the flooding, generators were installed at the studios and the transmitter site.

=== Multiple stations and a frequency swap ===
In 1986, Sacramento State University applied for a second radio station on 88.9 MHz, which had formerly been occupied by KERS in the 1960s and KXPR in the late 1970s and early 1980s. The July 1, 1991, launch of KXJZ (88.9 FM) created a second station focused on jazz and freed up more time on KXPR for classical music. KXPR became even more devoted to classical music when all news programming was consolidated on KXJZ in 1996. In 1998, the umbrella organization renamed itself Capital Public Radio.

The Capital Public Radio stations returned to the Sacramento State campus in 2004. On September 6, 2006, KXJZ and KXPR swapped frequencies in an effort to better serve the listening population and to improve KXJZ's coverage, particularly with regard to NPR news and talk programming. (As a result, KXJZ operates on the former KXPR license, and vice versa.) The switch was not possible without Capital Public Radio continuing to lease, and eventually acquiring, KUOP from the University of the Pacific, as moving KXJZ to 90.9 required that station to maintain its news programming; the 88.9 facility covers Stockton better but does not reach the northern portion of the Sacramento metropolitan area.

In 2020, KXPR and KXJZ will relocate to new facilities downtown at the corner of 8th and J streets, to accommodate the public radio network's expansion to 75 employees.

== Programming ==
KXJZ is CapRadio's NPR news service, airing public programming from NPR and other public radio distributors including Public Radio Exchange and American Public Media; the BBC World Service airs overnights. Local programs include the late morning hour Insight with Beth Ruyak and a Saturday night freeform music hour, K-ZAP on CapRadio.

== Repeaters ==
KXJZ's signal covers the entire Sacramento metropolitan area, including the cities of Auburn, Davis, Roseville, Folsom, Elk Grove, Yuba City and Marysville. It also reaches Fairfield, and Vacaville on the fringes of the San Francisco Bay Area. KXJZ's signal also reaches the northern San Joaquin Valley including the cities of Stockton and Modesto through repeater station KUOP (91.3 FM), Quincy through KQNC (88.1 FM) and the Lake Tahoe and Reno areas through repeater station KKTO (90.5 FM). There are three further translators for the news service, at Merced, South Lake Tahoe and Truckee.
