= List of Western Kentucky University people =

This is a list of notable alumni and faculty of Western Kentucky University.

== Alumni ==
=== Academia ===
- Herman Lee Donovan, former president of Eastern Kentucky University and the University of Kentucky
- James R. Ramsey, former president of the University of Louisville
- Michael G. Scales, president of Nyack College and Alliance Theological Seminary
- Billy Wilson, president of Oral Roberts University

=== Business ===
- Julian Goodman, former president of NBC
- Brad Kelley, businessman and (as of 2012) fourth-largest private landowner in the U.S. (attended; never graduated)

=== Film and television ===
- Matthew Alan, actor and producer
- K.C. Armstrong, former assistant producer of The Howard Stern Show
- John Carpenter, film director
- Clint Ford, voice actor
- Charmaine Hunt, one of 18 contestants on the fifth season of NBC's The Apprentice
- Matt Long, actor (Jack McCallister on WB's Jack & Bobby)
- Charles Napier, actor
- Michael Rosenbaum, actor (Lex Luthor on WB's Smallville)
- David Schramm, actor (Roy Biggins on NBC's Wings)
- Jonah Scott, actor

=== History ===
- Lowell H. Harrison, author, WKU university historian

=== Music ===
- Michael Card, contemporary Christian music artist
- Chris Carmichael, arranger, studio multi-instrumentalist
- Tyler Childers, 2019 Grammy nominee, folk country singer
- Stephen Cochran, country music singer/songwriter; United States Marine; former face of the US Veterans Affairs (VA) R&D Department (2009–14)
- Steve Gorman, rock drummer, The Black Crowes
- Larnelle Harris, gospel singer
- The Hilltoppers, 1950s popular singing group composed of WKU students including Billy Vaughn
- Chris Knight, country music singer/songwriter
- Bill Lloyd, country/pop/rock musician and composer, half of Foster & Lloyd with Radney Foster
- Mark Melloan, singer-songwriter, "High on a Hilltop" writer, and co-writer with Stephen Cochran
- Nappy Roots, rap group best known for "Good Day"
- Matthew Shultz, lead singer, guitarist for Cage the Elephant

=== Politics ===
- Chad Aull, politician
- Dwight D. Butler, member of the Kentucky House of Representatives
- Beverly Chester-Burton (born 1963), politician
- Mark Cole, member of Virginia House of Delegates
- James Comer, U.S. representative from Kentucky's 1st District
- Cordell Hull, secretary of state under FDR, Nobel Peace Prize winner
- Derek Lewis, member of Kentucky House of Representatives
- Brad Montell, member of Kentucky House of Representatives
- William Natcher, U.S. representative
- Amy Neighbors, member of Kentucky House of Representatives
- Edwin L. Norris, fifth governor of Montana
- Rebecca Raymer, politician
- Hal Rogers, U.S. representative from Kentucky

=== Science ===
- Harry Barkus Gray, chemist
- Farley Norman, psychological scientist
- Terrence W. Wilcutt, astronaut

=== Sports ===
- Darel Carrier, three-time ABA All-Star with the Kentucky Colonels
- Romeo Crennel, Houston Texans assistant head coach & defense
- Claire Donahue, swimmer, gold medalist, 2012 Summer Olympics
- Brandon Doughty, former NFL player
- Don Durham, former MLB player
- Ken Edenfield, former MLB player
- Jeremy Evans, NBA player with the Utah Jazz and 2012 slam dunk champion
- Tellis Frank, former NBA player with the Miami Heat
- Dee Gibson, former BAA and NPBL player
- Clem Haskins, former NBA player with Phoenix Suns, former NCAA basketball coach at WKU and the University of Minnesota
- Heath Haynes, former MLB player
- Tyler Higbee, current NFL player with the Los Angeles Rams
- Yolanda Hughes-Heying, IFBB professional bodybuilder
- Jeremi Johnson, former NFL Player, Cincinnati Bengals
- Crystal Kelly, former WNBA player, now women's basketball assistant coach at Bellarmine University
- Duane Kuiper, MLB player, now San Francisco Giants broadcaster
- Forrest Lamp, NFL player, Los Angeles Chargers
- Courtney Lee, NBA player, New York Knicks guard
- Virgil Livers, former NFL player, Chicago Bears
- Jim McDaniels, former ABA and NBA player
- Kenny Perry, professional golfer, PGA Tour and Champions Tour
- Jeff Peterek, former MLB player
- Doug Piatt, former MLB player
- Hugh Poland, former MLB player
- Bobby Rascoe, former ABA and NBA player
- Don Ray, former NBA player
- Rod Smart, XFL player known as "He Hate Me"
- Gavin Smellie, two-time Olympic sprinter for Canada
- Greg Smith, former NBA player
- Art Spoelstra, former NBA player
- Steve Stemle, former MLB player
- Libby Stout, former NWSL and professional soccer player, now women's soccer assistant coach at Southern Illinois University
- Taywan Taylor, NFL player, Cleveland Browns
- Chris Turner, former MLB player/catcher for the New York Yankees
- Ken Waller, bodybuilder
- Jim Weaver, former MLB pitcher
- Mike White, NFL player, New York Jets
- Bailey Zappe, American football quarterback in the NFL

=== Military ===
- Damon W. Cooper, U.S. Navy vice admiral and the first chief of U.S. Naval Reserve
- Jack Keane, general, United States Army
- Larry G. Smith, retired U.S. Army major general, former commanding general of the United States Army Security Assistance Command

=== Others ===
- Larry Elmore, fantasy artist
- Duncan Hines, journalist, namesake of the bakery products company
- Saeed Jones, poet, editor at BuzzFeed
- Jagdish Khubchandani, author and public health scholar
- Mitch McDeere, fictional protagonist in The Firm by John Grisham
- Kyla Scanlon, economics content creator, author of In This Economy?: How Money and Markets Really Work
- Barry A. Vann, author, lecturer

== Faculty ==
- David Bell, New York Times bestselling author
- Robert Duvall, politician
- Sylvia Kersenbaum, classical pianist
- William L. Lane, New Testament theologian and professor of biblical studies
- Garnie W. McGinty, Louisiana historian
- Thomas Nicholson, drug policy expert
