= Mark Melloan =

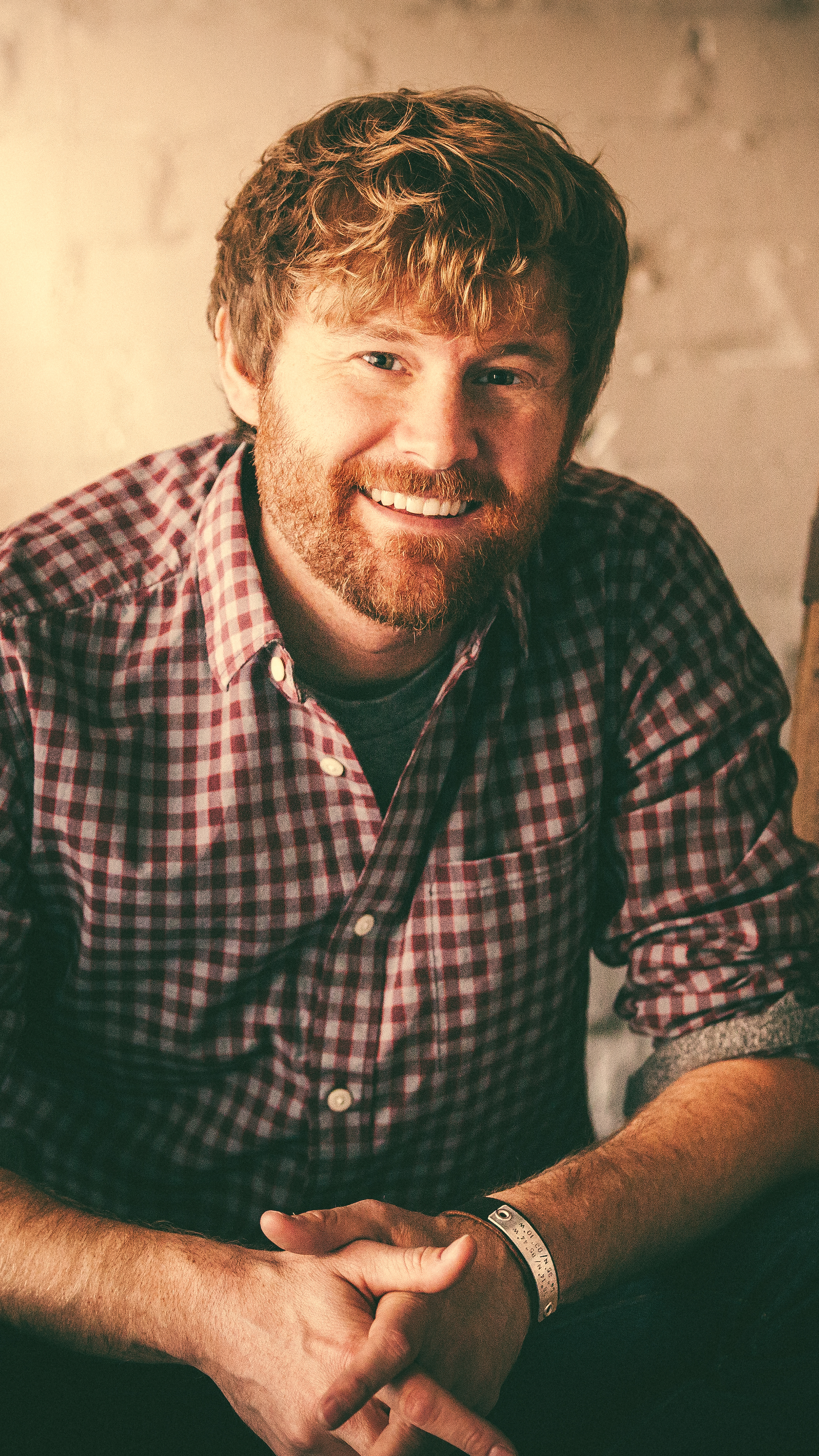
- Musician Mark Melloan in Louisville, KY

Background information
- Born: Mark Adam Melloan; February 18, 1981 (age 44); Elizabethtown, Kentucky, United States
- Genres: Singer-songwriter, folk rock, pop
- Occupations: Musician, songwriter
- Instruments: Guitar, Vocals
- Years active: 2002–present.
- Labels: Mammoth Onyx Music, Independent record label
- Website: markmelloan.com

Mark Melloan (pronounced Malone), is an American singer, songwriter, and musician.

== Music career ==
The 2002 album, "The Shadowlands," featured New Grass Revival founder Curtis Burch and three songs with banjoist Bela Fleck. The album was reviewed as "one of the best Americana bluesy collections", and Melloan was labeled "one of Kentucky's finest folk singer songwriters." Erika Brady, host of Western Public Radio's Barren River Breakdown, described him as "an artist with extreme potential... His voice as a writer is very distinctive, and he's a good performer."

In 2003, Western Kentucky University President Gary Ransdell encouraged Melloan to record "High on a Hilltop," an anthem written by Melloan celebrating the legacy of the popular basketball coach, Edgar Diddle. Several musicians and singers connected to the university appeared on the project (The Kentucky Headhunters guitarist Greg Martin, Byron House, Beegie Adair, Athena Cage, and Larnelle Harris). The song and video were aired in E. A. Diddle Arena and Nashville's Bridgestone Arena (then Gaylord Entertainment Center) before men's basketball games.

In 2006, the music publication "Country Weekly" described Melloan's songs, "Angel Choir" and "One Good Country Song," respectively as the best and worst songs on Stephen Cochran's self-titled album. Cochran, a retired Marine and champion for veterans issues, cowrote "Alone on Christmas" and "Hope" with Melloan. "Hope" was adopted by the United States Department of Veterans Affairs as a theme song for its research and development program.

"Hallelujah Love" was released in 2016. The album was mixed by Jason Lehning and mastered by Bob Ludwig. Contributors included pop singer David Mead, violinist Stuart Duncan, and drummer Steve Bowman. The album was recorded in several locations including the "Neve Room" at Quad Studios Nashville and Melloan's home studio. After a decade-long break from recording following the tragic death of a musician friend, Melloan credited his wife and small children for the hopeful tone of "Hallelujah Love." The album's opening track, "Misfortune Far Behind," conveyed his desire to leave the past behind and make uplifting music.

The music video for the second track, "Things I Feel," shows Melloan performing in a garage with a rock band including Wild Cub keyboardist Eric Wilson on electric guitar. In a narrative sequence, Melloan loads his musical equipment into a truck, seemingly to go on tour. Instead, he meets an equipment dealer at a warehouse, selling everything but a prized antique Gibson guitar his wife secretly removed from the sale.

The music video for "Safe" shows Melloan performing on a soundstage while images of hospitalized babies are projected in the background. His daughter, Lucy, inspired the project, having been born prematurely and hospitalized in a neonatal intensive care unit because her lung was deflated when she was born. Norton Children's Hospital used the song in a promotional campaign following their name change from Kosair Children's Hospital.

== Other works ==
In 2005, Melloan wrote "Baptism," a memoir describing his childhood experiences and spiritual journey.
