= Rule High School =

Rule High School may refer to:

- Rule High School (Texas)
- Rule High School (Knoxville)
