= WKYU =

WKYU may refer to:

- WKU Public Radio, the public radio service of Western Kentucky University in Bowling Green, Kentucky
- WKYU-FM, a radio station (88.9 FM) licensed to Bowling Green, Kentucky, United States
- WKYU-TV, a television station (channel 24 analog/18 digital) licensed to Bowling Green, Kentucky, United States
