= WKPB =

WKU Public Radio station in Henderson, Kentucky

- Henderson, Kentucky; United States
- Broadcast area: Tri-State Area
- Frequency: 89.5 MHz
- Branding: WKU Public Radio

Programming
- Format: Public radio
- Affiliations: American Public Media, National Public Radio, Public Radio International, Kentucky Public Radio

Ownership
- Owner: Western Kentucky University

History
- First air date: April 1, 1990; 36 years ago

Technical information
- Licensing authority: FCC
- Facility ID: 71864
- Class: C2
- ERP: 43,000 watts
- HAAT: 115 meters (377 ft)
- Transmitter coordinates: 37°51′06″N 87°19′43″W

Links
- Public license information: Public file; LMS
- Website: wkyufm.org

WKPB (89.5 FM) is a radio station licensed to Henderson, Kentucky. The station is owned by Western Kentucky University, and is an affiliate of the WKU Public Radio network.

== History of call letters ==
The call letters WKPB were earlier assigned to an FM station in Knoxville, Tennessee. Owned by the Knoxville Publishing Company (The Knoxville Journal newspaper), it began broadcasting October 15, 1947, on 93.3 MHz. This station ceased operations 18 months later, on April 15, 1949, with the Journal citing the uncertainty created by the advent of television. The newspaper sold its equipment to the University of Tennessee at Knoxville (which started WUOT using it that fall) and its records to the general public.
