= Rule High School (Knoxville) =

Public high school in Tennessee, US

Coordinates: 35.9752°N 83.9538°W

Rule High School was a public high school in Knoxville, Tennessee. It opened in 1927 and closed in 1991. It was named for William Rule, founder of The Knoxville Journal and Mayor of Knoxville in 1873 and from 1898 to 1899.

== History ==
The school was named after Knoxville newspaper editor and mayor Captain William Rule (1839–1928). When it originally opened in the fall of 1927, it was an elementary-junior high school with 525 students enrolled in the elementary grades and 261 in the junior high and high school grades. Lower grades were dropped year after year, until eventually the school just had grades 7–9.

An effort was made to append a grade 12 to the school curriculum, however that initially fell through. On April 14, 1937, 600 students from grades seven through 11, wanting a 12th grade, staged a walkout protest. The protest was reported on the front page of the New York Times. On May 9, 1938, the school board decided to add a 12th grade. The first 12th grade class, consisting of 31 students, graduated in 1939.

Rule High School was closed in 1991. Although the building is in bad shape it is still standing. Mary C. Hodge Halsey wrote the book, "Golden Memories of Rule High School - A History." It is a 426-page book with pictures, copies of school programs, and stories of faculty members and students.

The school was inactivated on March 24, 2000. It was demolished in 2023.

== Notable alumni ==
- Mike Cofer '79, former NFL linebacker for the Detroit Lions and player for the Tennessee Volunteers.
- Roy Smith, former CFL football player for the Ottawa Rough Riders and player for the Tennessee Volunteers.
- Gus Manning '43, University of Tennessee Athletic Department official
- Louis Hofferbert ’44, former city law director
- Mike Padgett ’66, Knox County Clerk
- Jerry Helton, father of former Major League Baseball star and UT quarterback Todd Helton
