= WEKU =

Public radio station in Richmond, Kentucky

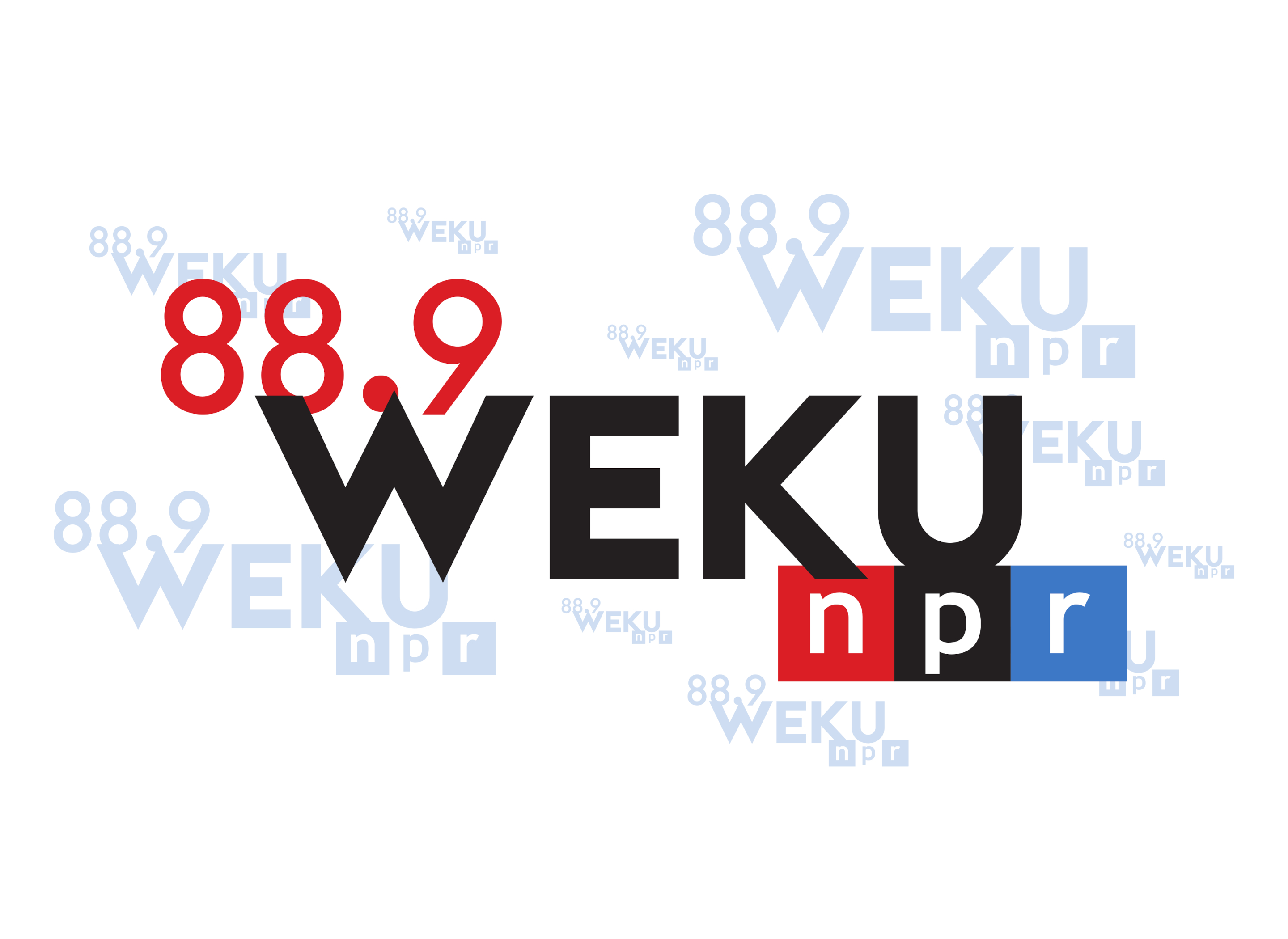
- Richmond, Kentucky; United States
- Broadcast area: Lexington Metro area Northern Kentucky; Central Kentucky; Eastern Kentucky
- Frequency: 88.9 MHz (HD Radio)
- Branding: Lexington's Choice for NPR

Programming
- Format: Public radio - News - Talk
- Subchannels: HD2: Classical music
- Affiliations: National Public Radio; American Public Media; Public Radio Exchange; BBC World Service; Kentucky Public Radio

Ownership
- Owner: Eastern Kentucky University

History
- First air date: October 7, 1968; 57 years ago
- Call sign meaning: W Eastern Kentucky University

Technical information
- Licensing authority: FCC
- Facility ID: 18307
- Class: C1
- ERP: 50,000 watts
- HAAT: 219 meters (719 ft)
- Transmitter coordinates: 37°52′45″N 84°19′33″W

Links
- Public license information: Public file; LMS
- Webcast: Listen live HD2: Listen live
- Website: www.weku.org

WEKU (88.9 FM) is a non-commercial, listener-supported, public radio station in Richmond, Kentucky. It is a charter member of National Public Radio and it is owned by Eastern Kentucky University, broadcasting a news, talk and information format.

WEKU is a Class C1 station. It has an effective radiated power (ERP) of 50,000 watts. The transmitter is off Igo Road near Interstate 75. The signal covers northern, central and eastern Kentucky, including nearby Lexington. Programming is also heard on several satellite stations and FM translators.

== Satellites and translators ==
WEKU operates five full-power satellite stations and five low-power FM translator stations. Their combined footprint covers nearly half of the Commonwealth. In December 2024, WEKU added its 10th transmitter, WEKM 88.1 FM serving Maysville, Kentucky.

Broadcast translators for WEKU
Call sign	Frequency	City of license	FID	ERP (W)	HAAT	Class	Transmitter coordinates	FCC info
WEKU	88.9 FM	Richmond, Kentucky	18307	50,000	219 m (719 ft)	C1	37°52′45.3″N 18°19′32.8″W	LMS
WEKM	88.1 FM	Maysville, Kentucky	763940	2,095	68 m (223 ft)	A	38°41′15.3″N 83°48′46.5″W	LMS
WEKC	88.5 FM	Corbin, Kentucky	92574	21,000	152 m (499 ft)	C2	37°01′13″N 84°23′41″W	LMS
WEKH	90.9 FM	Hazard, Kentucky	18306	31,000	324 m (1,063 ft)	C1	37°11′35″N 83°11′17″W	LMS
WEKP	90.1 FM	Pineville, Kentucky	173819	5,200	227 m (745 ft)	C2	36°45′13″N 83°42′30″W	LMS
W245AS	96.9 FM	Barbourville, Kentucky	146303	55	20 m (66 ft)	D	36°51′30″N 83°52′15″W	LMS
W294BG	106.7 FM	Frankfort, Kentucky	144169	120	26.3 m (86 ft)	D	38°11′47″N 84°51′44″W	LMS
W242BR	96.3 FM	Harlan, Kentucky	158297	30	281.9 m (925 ft)	D	36°54′3″N 83°18′14″W	LMS
W273AY	102.5 FM	Middlesboro, Kentucky	146280	10	431.5 m (1,416 ft)	D	36°38′29″N 83°46′25″W	LMS
W236AY	95.1 FM	Pikeville, Kentucky	141596	10	133.7 m (439 ft)	D	37°29′31″N 82°31′12″W	LMS

== See also ==
- Campus radio
- List of college radio stations in the United States
