= Mike Cofer (linebacker) =

American football player (1960–2019)

No. 66, 55
- Position: Linebacker

Personal information
- Born: April 7, 1960; Knoxville, Tennessee, U.S.
- Died: March 21, 2019 (aged 58); Fayetteville, Georgia, U.S.
- Listed height: 6 ft 5 in (1.96 m)
- Listed weight: 245 lb (111 kg)

Career information
- High school: Rule (Knoxville)
- College: Tennessee
- NFL draft: 1983: 3rd round, 67th overall pick

Career history
- Detroit Lions (1983–1993)

Awards and highlights
- Pro Bowl (1988); Second-team All-SEC (1982)

Career NFL statistics
- Sacks: 62.5
- Interceptions: 1
- Fumble recoveries: 10
- Stats at Pro Football Reference

Michael Lynn Cofer (April 7, 1960 – March 21, 2019) was an American professional football player who was a linebacker in the National Football League (NFL). He was selected by the Detroit Lions in the third round of the 1983 NFL draft. He was a Pro Bowl selection in 1988.

Cofer played college football for the Tennessee Volunteers and was a captain on their 1982 squad.

== Early life and college ==
Cofer was born in Knoxville, Tennessee, and grew up in the city's Mechanicsville neighborhood. He played high school football at Rule High School. Following his senior season, he was named to the Parade All-American team, and was the number one recruit in the state, with offers from 50 schools.

Cofer played college football at the University of Tennessee from 1979 through the 1982 season. In 1979, he played in all eleven games, registering 27 tackles (11 solo) and a fumble recovery. In 1980, he played in five games, picking up 32 tackles (22 solo), including a sack and two tackles for a loss, as well as two fumble recoveries, before suffering a season-ending knee injury. Cofer played in 10 games in 1981, registering 94 tackles (53 solo) and a blocked punt. He played in 11 games in 1982, tallying 84 tackles (58 solo), including 4 sacks and 5 tackles for a loss, as well as two fumble recoveries. He was named All-SEC following the 1982 season.

At Tennessee, Cofer was known as Mike "Stop" Cofer to distinguish him from his teammate, Mike "Go" Cofer, who played tight end.

== Professional career ==
Cofer was selected in the third round (67th overall) by the Detroit Lions in the 1983 NFL draft. He played 10 seasons in the NFL, all with the Lions, starting in 104 games. He registered 511 tackles and 63 sacks during his career.

Cofer played in all 16 games during his rookie season, earning 4.5 sacks. During his second season, he moved into the starting lineup, picking up 7 sacks. Initially a defensive end, he switched to linebacker in 1985 when the Lions' new head coach, Darryl Rogers, installed a 3–4 defense. He registered 7.5 sacks in 1986, and would lead the team in sacks each season from 1987 through 1990. He garnered 12 sacks in 1988 to earn an invitation to the Pro Bowl.

Cofer struggled with injuries during the early 1990s, missing most of the 1991 season and part of the 1992 season. After spending the entire 1993 season on injured reserve, he was waived by the Lions.

== Later life and family ==
Cofer lived near Atlanta with his wife, Reba. They have two sons together, Michael Isaiah and Philip. His younger brother, Joe, also played for Tennessee. Phil Cofer was a member of the Florida State Seminoles men's basketball team.

In September 2013, Cofer was honored as a Vol Legend of the Game during Tennessee's game against South Alabama.

Diagnosed with amyloidosis in 2007, Cofer died in Fayetteville, Georgia, on March 21, 2019, at the age of 58.
