= William Rule (editor) =

American newspaper editor and politician (1839–1928)

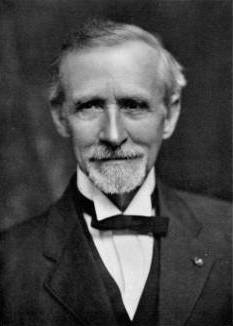
- Born: May 10, 1839; Knox County, Tennessee, United States
- Died: July 26, 1928 (aged 89); Knoxville, Tennessee
- Resting place: Old Gray Cemetery; Knoxville, Tennessee
- Occupations: Newspaper publisher and editor
- Notable work: Standard History of Knoxville (1900)
- Political party: Republican
- Spouse: Lucy Ann Maxey
- Parent(s): Frederick and Sarah Brakebill Rule

William Rule (May 10, 1839 – July 26, 1928) was an American newspaper editor and politician, best known as the founder of The Knoxville Journal, which was published in Knoxville, Tennessee, from 1870 until 1991. A protégé of vitriolic newspaper editor William G. "Parson" Brownlow, Rule established the Journal (initially called the Chronicle) as a successor to Brownlow's Knoxville Whig.

A Union officer in the Civil War, Rule twice served as mayor of Knoxville (in 1873 and 1898). He published the city's first comprehensive history, Standard History of Knoxville, in 1900.

== Early life ==
Rule was born in rural Knox County, Tennessee, about 7 miles (11 km) south of Knoxville, the son of Frederick and Sarah (Brakebill) Rule. He occasionally attended county schools, but was largely self-educated. In 1858, Rule and his brother, James, opened a general store at the corner of State Street and Cumberland Avenue in Knoxville. By 1860, this store had closed, and William joined the staff of Brownlow's Knoxville Whig, a radical and controversial pro-Union newspaper. East Tennessee had many Union supporters, but Middle and West Tennessee had more slaveholders and allied with the Confederacy.

On November 10, 1861, in the early days of the Civil War, Rule eluded Knoxville's Confederate occupiers to carry news and messages to Brownlow, who was hiding out in Wears Valley. Rule eventually fled to Kentucky and enlisted in Company A of the 6th Tennessee Infantry. He rose to the rank of captain, directing a company, before he was mustered out in 1865.

== Post-war years ==
After the war, Rule rejoined the Whig, this time serving as the paper's City Editor. He was elected to his first political office, Knox County Court Clerk, in 1866, and was reelected in 1870, but resigned after one year.

=== Editor ===
In 1869, the Whig, which was the only pro-Republican newspaper in the post-bellum South, was sold to Knoxville businessman Joseph Mabry, who attempted to rebrand it as a Democratic Party newspaper. To ensure the survival of Knoxville's pro-Republican newspaper tradition, Rule left the Whig in 1870 and formed the Knoxville Chronicle, which he considered the true successor to Brownlow's paper. When Brownlow returned to Knoxville after his Senate term had ended in 1875, he purchased a half stake in the Chronicle. The paper was published as the Whig and Chronicle until Brownlow's death in 1877.

=== Political career ===
Rule was first elected Mayor of Knoxville in 1873. That year many towns in the Mississippi Valley and related tributaries suffered high mortality in a cholera epidemic, associated with contaminated water. The first cases were reported in New Orleans in February, and the disease was carried upriver by travelers.

Rule spearheaded a successful initiative to establish a city waterworks, which Knoxville voters approved in June of that year. He also opened a smallpox hospital on the outskirts of town, and appointed a board of health.

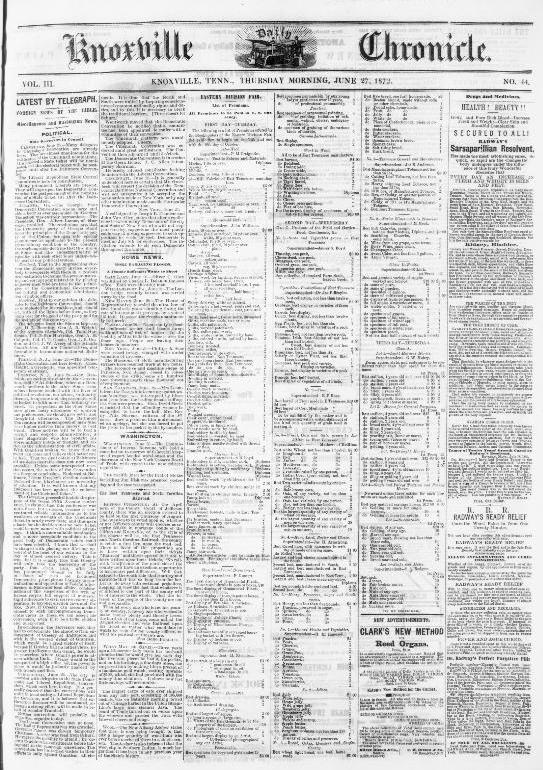
Front page of the June 27, 1872, issue of the Knoxville Chronicle

=== Controversies ===
During the 1880s, the Chronicle quarreled with the pro-Democratic Knoxville Tribune. On the morning of March 11, 1882, the Chronicle featured an article accusing the Tribune of publishing obscene material. That evening, James W. Wallace, editor of the Tribune, angrily accosted Rule on Gay Street, and demanded he issue a retraction. When Rule refused, Wallace proceeded to loudly issue a "formal denunciation" of Rule. As Wallace spoke, Rule bashed him over the head with a cane, whereupon Wallace drew a pistol and fired three shots, all of which missed. Both Wallace and Rule were arrested, but no charges were filed, and each of the editors blamed the other for the incident.

Throughout the 1880s, Rule's newspaper (which after a series of ownership changes became The Knoxville Journal) was the mouthpiece for the so-called "Houk Machine." This Republican political syndicate was headed by Leonidas C. Houk (a former rival of Rule) and dominated East Tennessee politics.

In 1887, Rule published a speech, "The Loyalists of Tennessee in the Late War," which detailed the actions of East Tennessee's Unionists during the Civil War. During the same period, Rule spoke out against Appalachian stereotypes (which were beginning to take shape), arguing that people from the region had normal levels of intelligence, but suffered due to Southern states' lack of funding for public schools.

On January 29, 1888, the Rule family was involved in another violent incident in Knoxville. After the Journal published an article questioning the competence of Dr. A. T. West, who had been appointed city physician by the Board of Aldermen, West's sons, John and William, confronted Rule's brother, James (an editor for the Journal), outside St. John's Episcopal Church, and demanded he reveal the article's author. When Rule refused, the Wests attacked him. Rule was shot through the wrist and stabbed before he managed to draw a pistol and fire blindly, killing John West.

In 1900, Rule cowrote and edited the Standard History of Knoxville, the city's first fully comprehensive history. After Rule was elected again as mayor in 1898, he sold his ownership stake in the Journal, but continued as the paper's editor. After his death from appendicitis in 1928, he was described as having been the "oldest active editor in the U.S." by Time magazine. Rule is buried with his family in Old Gray Cemetery.

== Legacy ==
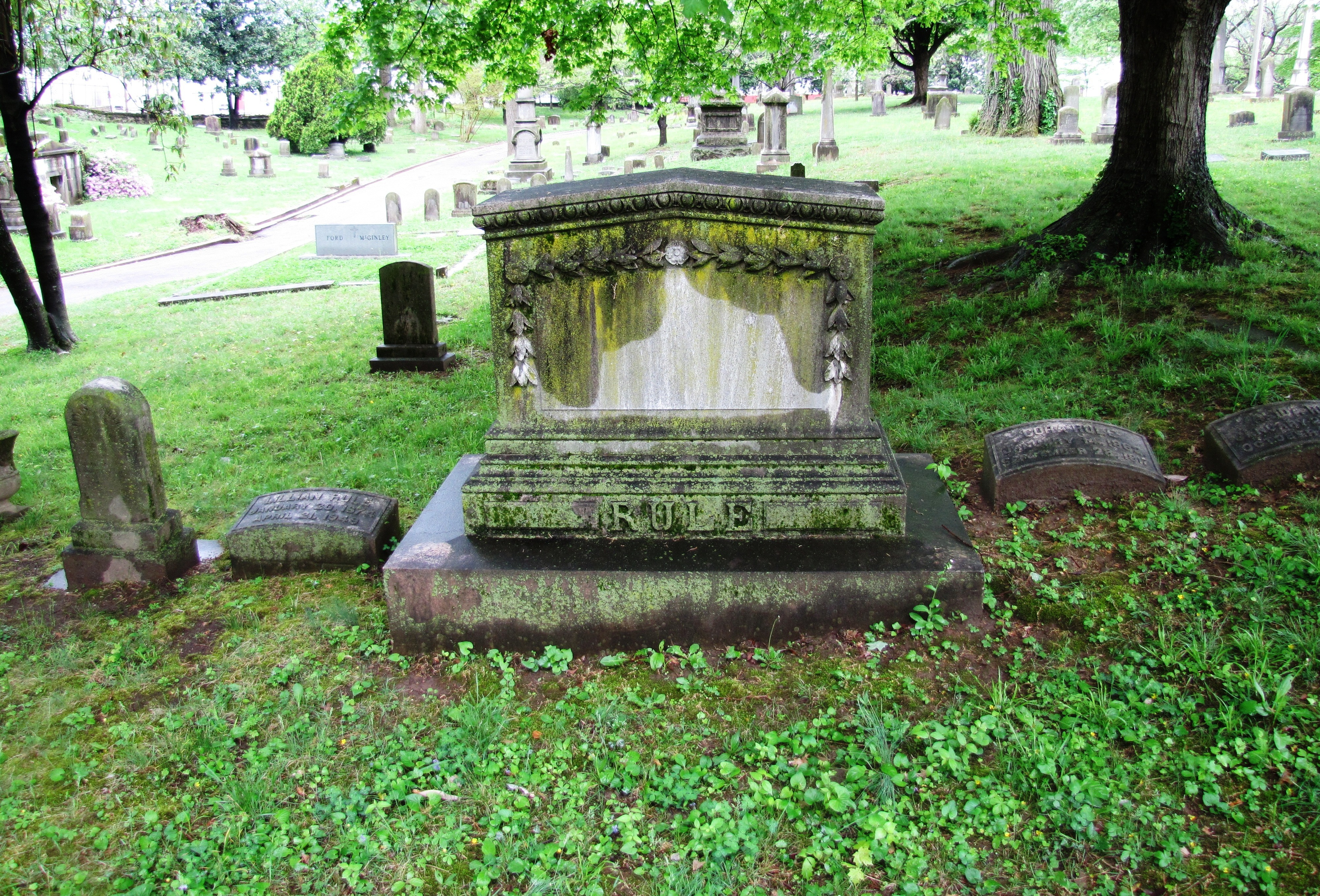
Rule's grave at Old Gray Cemetery

In the 1870s, Adolph Ochs began his newspaper career at Rule's Chronicle as a "printer's devil." He later became publisher of the New York Times. Ochs's biographer suggests that Ochs harbored superstitions about cemeteries, and as his walk home passed the First Presbyterian Church Cemetery, he often stayed at the Chronicle office all night, and passed the time learning the printer's trade.

Rule's grandson, Gunby Rule, worked as an editor for the Journal and later the News-Sentinel into the latter half of the 20th century.

A house built by Rule at 1604 Clinch Avenue in the Fort Sanders neighborhood is now classified as a contributing property within the National Register of Historic Places-listed Fort Sanders Historic District.

Rule High School, named after William Rule, operated in Knoxville from 1927 until 1991.
