= WKMS-FM =

Public radio station at Murray State University in Murray, Kentucky

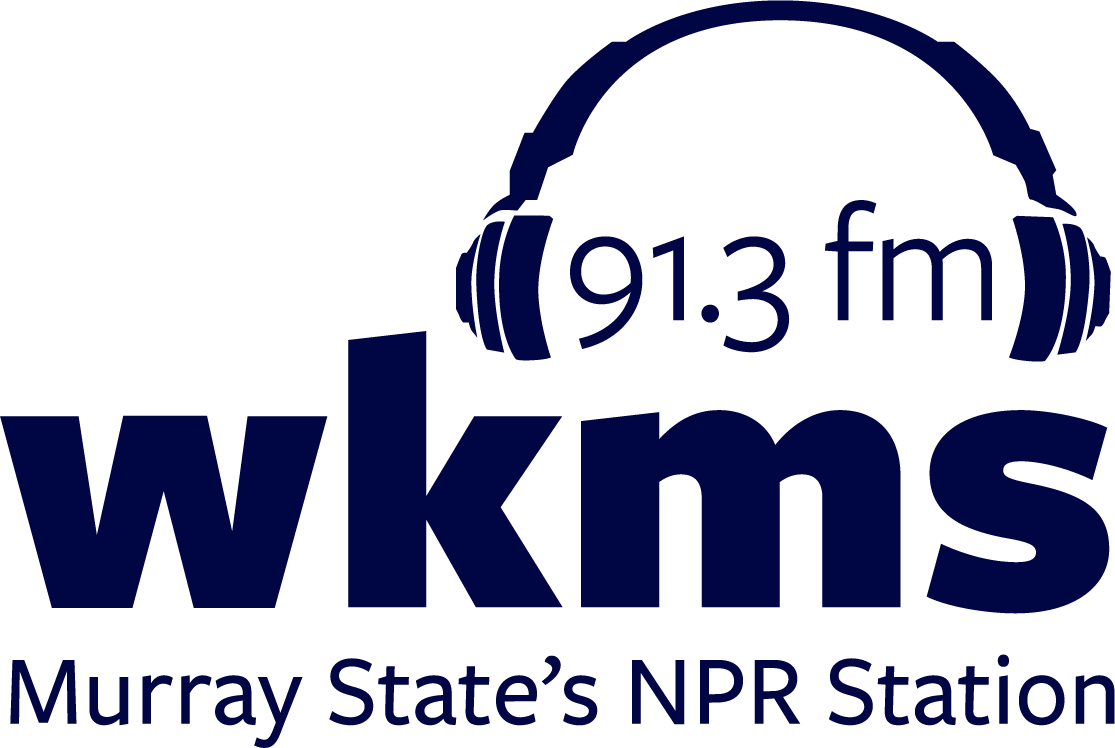
- Murray, Kentucky; United States
- Broadcast area: Western Kentucky
- Frequencies: WKMS-FM 91.3 (MHz) Murray, KY (HD Radio): WKMD 90.9 (MHz) Madisonville, KY; WKMT 89.5 (MHz) Fulton, KY
- Branding: WKMS News and Music

Programming
- Format: Public radio, Alternative rock, Jazz, News/Talk
- Subchannels: HD2: Classical; HD3: WKMS Music
- Affiliations: NPR, PRX, APM, BBC, CPB, KPRN

Ownership
- Owner: Murray State University

History
- First air date: May 11, 1970

Technical information
- Licensing authority: FCC
- Facility ID: 47080
- Class: C1
- ERP: 100,000 watts
- HAAT: 183 meters
- Transmitter coordinates: 36°55′17″N 88°05′48″W
- Translators: W258AJ, 99.5 (MHz) Murray, KY (all-classical, HD2): WKMD: W226CV, 93.1 (MHz) Madisonville, KY; W223BO, 92.5 (MHz) Paducah, KY (all-classical, HD2)

Links
- Public license information: Public file; LMS
- Webcast: Listen Live; Listen Live (HD2); Listen Live (HD3)
- Website: wkms.org

WKMS-FM (91.3 FM), is a non-commercial National Public Radio-affiliated station operated by Murray State University in Murray, Kentucky. WKMS features a variety of NPR programming and local music shows including classical music, bluegrass, alternative rock, jazz, electronica and world music. WKMS signed on for the first time on May 11, 1970, as a non-commercial, educational FM station licensed to MSU.

== Overview ==
The station now broadcasts in analog FM stereo and HD Digital on 91.3 MHz, with 100,000 watts of analog and 1,000 watts of digital power, from antennas nearly 600 feet above average terrain currently located at the Land Between the Lakes, and streams these signals on the internet. The station also operates translators in Paducah, Madisonville, and Murray. In 2009, WKMS installed repeater services for Madisonville as well as Fulton, which also covers Martin and Union City, Tennessee.

The station's signal reaches southernmost Illinois, far western Kentucky, and northwestern Tennessee. Listeners elsewhere can visit wkms.org to hear its programs.

The station offers two separate channels of programming on its digital signal: HD-1 simulcasts programming on analog 91.3 FM, while HD-2 offers classical music programming 24 hours a day. WKMS has emergency auxiliary transmitters at its tower on the site of the former Mont, Kentucky in the Land Between the Lakes territory, and at its studios on the eighth floor of Price Doyle Fine Arts Center at MSU.

WKMS also broadcasts programming from American Public Media, the Public Radio Exchange, the BBC, the Associated Press, independent producers from around the nation, and local content by staff or volunteers. WKMS News is a contributing correspondent to the Kentucky Public Radio News Exchange and a partner in funding the Kentucky Capitol Bureau.

== History ==
=== Early history ===
In 1948, WNBS radio owner Chuck Shuffett gave the Murray State drama department an hour a week of airtime on his station to broadcast plays adapted for radio. It was not until October 4, 1949, though, that the first broadcast from what was then Murray State College was heard, with Murray State College on the Air. The studio from which the program was broadcast consisted of a handmade control board located in the old Economics room on the third floor of Wilson Hall. The title of the show was changed in the 1950s to The Thoroughbred Hour and broadcast nightly half-hour segments. The content changed from radio drama to campus information. The Thoroughbred Hour was under the direction of Charles Henry Stamps through the use of a telephone line.

In 1962, The Thoroughbred Hour's staff was split into an audio department and a technical department under the direction of a student program director and a student chief engineer. In the early 1960s, a news department was added, emphasizing in-depth, on-the-spot reporting for the Jackson Purchase region of southwestern Kentucky. In 1964 an official station manager, program director and engineer were instituted on The Thoroughbred Hour. Also in 1964, special broadcasts began with the MSC Homecoming Parade. The Thoroughbred Hour was expanded to full one-hour segments Mondays through Fridays and two hours on Sundays in 1965. During this year, live broadcasts expanded and included broadcasts from the Auditorium, the Student Union Building, freshman basketball games, a professor's 20th-year banquet, and the Quad-State Band and Choral festivals. The Thoroughbred Hour Tape Library was formed in 1966; MSC was renamed MSU that same year by an act of the Kentucky General Assembly. The library provided MSU with a permanent record of important events. By 1967, a Board of Directors was established.

Ray Mofield, general manager of The Radio Center, The Voice of Murray State, helped develop funding for a radio station in the university budget.

Up until 1969, WKMS was originally branded "The Radio Center, The Voice of Murray State." Executive assistant Ray Mofield pushed for a radio station to be included in the 1965–66 MSC budgets. Mofield convinced then-MSC President Ralph Woods of the benefits from a radio station on campus, and as a result, $15,000 was set aside for its development. In 1968 Woods applied for a non-commercial educational radio license from the Federal Communications Commission (FCC) and requested for the frequency to be located at 91.7. In 1969, the FCC granted a construction permit for WKMS to operate at 91.3 FM, as 91.7 was already taken by a nearby station.

=== 1970s ===
WKMS-FM, the broadcasting service of Murray State, started formal operations on May 11, 1970. MSU President Dr. Harry Sparks noted this milestone and said, "With this radio station's audience we lengthen the shadow and multiply the sphere of influence of this University. Every broadcast of whatever type is a public relations message saying something about this school." Sparks also put forth a mission for WKMS to follow, "We perceive WKMS as the window on the world for our region. It will help cast a longer shadow for Murray State University and will deliver not only news about Murray State but will also offer culturally and educationally enriched programming throughout the Murray State region." At first, the station only employed Mofield as a general manager and Thomas Morgan as station manager, both of whom were assisted by students and volunteers. Because of this arrangement, broadcasts were only available while school was in session.

The two rooms in the northwest corner of Wilson Hall were not able to meet the productive, professional environmental needs of educational radio broadcasts that Mofield had first envisioned. Mofield and other faculty of Murray State raised about a million dollars to build the Price Doyle Fine Arts Building, the new location for WKMS. In September 1971, the building was officially open for use. In its permanent home on the sixth floor (in the late 1990s the sixth floor was relabeled the eighth floor), WKMS was fully equipped with offices, soundproof studios, state-of-the-art RCA equipment, and a new stereo with FM capability. In September 1972, WKMS affiliated itself with National Public Radio. When NPR was created, affiliated stations received support from the Corporation for Public Broadcasting, a nonprofit organization funded in part by the United States Congress. With finances from CPB, the station was able to upgrade its network interconnection: a high-quality telephone line. The flagship NPR program of its day, All Things Considered, became the only daily newscast on WKMS and was an instant success. In 1973, WKMS received its first-ever underwriter, the Cleveland Orchestra, which supplied a 13-week grant. Businesses took a cue from the Orchestra and began participating in underwriting. During that same year, WKMS provided the only radio source in western Kentucky for the Watergate scandal hearings. WKMS has since provided a service for the region in equally important moments in U.S. history, such as airing the hearings regarding the nomination of Ruth Bader Ginsburg to the Supreme Court of the United States, complete coverage of the Space Shuttle Columbia disaster, complete coverage of the beginning of U.S. military operations in Afghanistan, the Presidential impeachment proceedings of 1999, complete coverage of the events following the September 11 attacks in 2001, and complete coverage of the January 2009 Central Plains and Midwest ice storm that hit most of western Kentucky and the surrounding region.

October 1976 marked the year WKMS started membership coordination. There were several levels of giving: to obtain station membership, "student friends" could donate three dollars, basic adult "friends" five dollars, "good friends" 10 dollars, "great friends" 25 dollars, and "best friends" 50 dollars. Membership applications were found on the back of the first-ever programming guides and were sent to the station by postal mail. As with other public broadcasting stations of that time, programming guides were perquisites sent to members, released monthly at first, later seasonally. The guides always began with a letter from the station manager discussing new programs added to the schedule and the reasons some others were removed. There were statements of the current WKMS financial situation as well as a reminder of the importance of listener support. The guides would also have a grid containing a regular week's program schedule in it, and a description of each show's features. Later they would include features about staff, volunteers, musicians, and/or composers. Still later, guides would also eventually mention the involvement of WKMS in the community and community feedback to those efforts.

The advent of advanced technology took place in the late 1970s with a sophisticated system of satellite interconnection of radio and television around the country. Before the new technology, stations were linked by terrestrial landlines that were leased from AT&T. Costly telephone lines delivered a low-quality signal, which was only suitable for the deliverance of spoken-word programs, not musical ones. The satellite connections, however, would transmit all programs, music and talk alike, and "be of the highest quality." The satellite transmissions would also permit stereo and quadraphonic network broadcasts, therefore allowing WKMS to broadcast live concerts from anywhere in the world. Consequently, content for broadcast was enlarged and the station was given more options to choose from.

On November 5, 1979, Morning Edition premiered and became an instant hit, like its afternoon counterpart All Things Considered. It also was the first show to transmit from NPR through the new satellite terminal. That year, WKMS received a $150,000 facilities grant from the then-U.S. Department of Health, Education and Welfare to increase power and upgrade studio facilities, a milestone accomplishment. The station moved its transmission from the old Kentucky Educational Television tower in Farmington, Kentucky to its present co-location with the Kentucky Early Warning System in the Land Between the Lakes area. The 501-foot-tall (153 m) tower and the station's two transmitters receive the WKMS signal from the studios at MSU by microwave.

=== 1980s ===
Former Program Director Mark Welch in 1981, hosting a classical music show called Masterwork's Showcase.

The 1980s were a notable decade for WKMS-FM. On March 30, 1980, at 5 p.m., WKMS boosted its power to 100,000 watts. Dick Estell from the national Radio Reader program stopped by the studios in 1983 to help with a fundraiser. Listener Joy Thomas of Murray won the "Powdermilk Biscuit" recipe contest, related to the then-popular Prairie Home Companion show on Saturday evenings. Weekend Edition premiered on Saturday, November 2, 1985. At first, it was only aired on Saturday mornings. It took NPR until January 18, 1987, to debut a Sunday morning Weekend Edition. With that, NPR finally provided a full news service seven mornings and seven evenings per week. Furthermore, both NPR news shows were well regarded by WKMS listeners.

WKMS experienced nationwide recognition with locally produced shows that were distributed by NPR around the country. Twenty-seven NPR stations in 16 states (ten percent of the network at the time) picked up The Black Cats Jump, a WKMS-produced show hosted by Bobby Bryan. The Black Cats Jump was a 13-week series of hour-long programs about big band music. The series featured some of the great black big-band leaders, sidemen, vocalists, and arrangers. The first broadcast of the show was aired live on Friday, October 3, 1980, at 8 p.m. Bryan was inspired to do the show by the re-release of many of big-band sides on re-mastered 33⅓ and 45 rpm vinyl records that featured the contributions of artists from 1934 to 1950. He explained, "During the '30s and '40s, the big hotels and ballrooms played by white bands controlled most of the air time for big bands, and black bands simply did not get the exposure they deserved. And if you didn't get air time, your records didn't sell very well." He said most every white musician copied and learned from black musicians, but the public did not know that fact, a knowledge that did not occur until the likes of Benny Goodman, Charlie Barnet, Artie Shaw, and others began to integrate the bands and share the spotlight. Bryan later created another 13-hour series about Billie Holiday and the musical biographies of over 40 major artists who had played with her over three decades. He named it "Lady Day and the Cats." Nearly 100 stations in 36 states picked up the broadcasts.

The 1980s also witnessed the switch from vinyl records and cassette tapes to compact discs. WKMS took the opportunity to educate the community with tips on how to purchase CDs, recommended retailers, what genres sounded better, and so forth. On August 21, 1988, a lightning strike set off a chain reaction that "fried many components and circuitry" within the WKMS transmitter. As a result, the station had a noticeably long period of dead air. Station manager Janet Kenney cleverly named it "Sounds of Silence" and used the incident to WKMS's advantage. In the fall 1988 programming guide, she addressed the situation to listeners and challenged them to recall the need they had for public radio during the silence, and reminded them of the importance of their support. The fall Friendship Festival that year easily met the fundraising goal and, in fact, surpassed it.

=== 1990s ===
On January 24, 1990, the Attorney General of Kentucky, Fredric J. Cowan, wrote to WKMS. He commended the station for providing western Kentucky with information "that is crucial in our system of democracy." WKMS celebrated its 20th birthday that year, and as a special treat, Bob Edwards, then host of Morning Edition, came to WKMS for a special-guest, open-house informal seminar. He also joined the WKMS staff and volunteers at the Paducah Symphony's Concert in the Park at Kentucky Dam Village State Resort Park. On July 15, 1994, the old MSU fine arts center, a connecting building to the Doyle Price Fine Arts Center, caught fire. The station was knocked off the air from 9 a.m. until the next day. WKMS remained unharmed, except for minor smoke damage in a few studios.

During the 1990s, WKMS expanded to a 24-hour-per-day, seven-days-per-week schedule to serve its five-state area. Further, the creation of online streaming offers worldwide listening opportunities. Translators have been erected to expand broadcasts to 92.1 in Paducah, 99.5 in Paris, Tennessee, and 105.1 in Madisonville. Two studios were also added to the station's facility.

=== 2000s ===
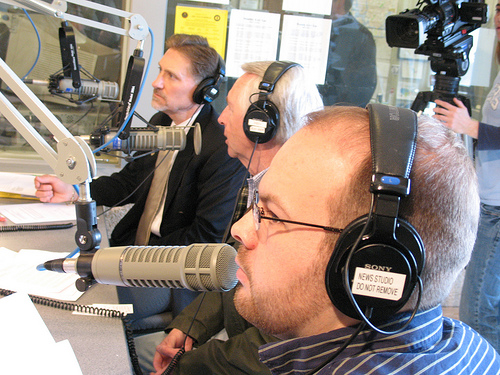
WKMS News Director Chad Lampe (right) with Murray State University President Dr. Randy Dunn (left) with Kentucky Governor Steve Beshear (middle), during the January 2009 Central Plains and Midwest ice storm.

In the late spring of 2007, WKMS-FM started a new digital signal which virtually eliminates noise in broadcasting such as static, "hisses," "pops," and fading. The new technology also provides a second channel in which WKMS airs classical music. NPR and Public Radio International (PRI), later Public Radio Exchange (PRX), now send their shows through the internet. As such, it only takes a matter of minutes for a show to be received. The process is much faster than the 1979 satellite transmission that recorded shows in real time.

=== The January 2009 Central Plains and Midwest ice storm ===
During the January 2009 Central Plains and Midwest ice storm, power was temporarily lost to the regional signal at the tower and HD radio digital transmission system in the Land Between the Lakes, and the station operated from its studio site auxiliary system, a low-power transmitter and line that reached most of Calloway County and the WKMS translator in Paris (see above).

By January 31, a generator obtained with the assistance of the Calloway County Emergency Operations Center and the U.S. Department of Agriculture's Forestry Service enabled the station to resume its regional analog service. However, the HD radio signal remained damaged and inoperable. Tower inspections revealed icing damage to a flange weld connecting the digital antenna to its transmission line, resulting in water damage to the line itself. Repairs were estimated at nearly $40,000 in previously unbudgeted expenditures from MSU. All services, including the HD radio signal, have since resumed normal operations.

A view of WKMS Studio A during the 2008 Autumn Fund Drive.

=== 2010s ===
In February 2010, WKMS changed the frequency and the programming on its Paducah translator to carry a 24-hour classical music service. The Paducah translator, formerly at 92.1, was moved to 92.5 FM. Broadcasts include the Paducah Symphony Orchestra, concerts from MSU, and nationally syndicated programs like From the Top and Sunday Baroque. The Paducah translator broadcasts at 27 watts, designed to improve WKMS reception for area listeners in spots of low elevation that are due to the proximity of the Ohio River, where a lack of clear lines of sight impeded reception from the main WKMS 100,000 watt transmitter in the Land Between the Lakes.

In March 2010, WKMS started a new repeater service, 90.9 FM, WKMD, in Madisonville. Additionally, the station placed its all-classical WKMS HD-2 service on the 105.1 FM, Madisonville translator. The repeater service at 90.9 FM transmits from a tower on campus at Madisonville Community College. This is a repeater transmitter that broadcasts a signal of just over 20,000 watts. WKMD rebroadcasts the main WKMS signal to areas of Union, Webster, Daviess, McLean, Ohio, Muhlenberg and Christian counties, all of which were previously outside a public radio service coverage area, and boosts the reception for listeners in Hopkins County.

In June 2010, WKMS improved reception for listeners in Fulton, South Fulton, Martin, and Union City with a repeater service, 89.5 FM, WKMT, in Fulton. WKMT restores a strong signal from WKMS to Fulton, one of the communities that experienced reduced reception when WKMS moved its transmission site from Farmington to the Land Between the Lakes in 1980. WKMS is using a data-link connection to transmit programming to the WKMT tower from its MSU studios.

In 2012, WKMS launched the Youth Radio Project, involving local youth in radio production. This project grew with a grant from the Carson Myre Charitable Foundation in 2013 to record and broadcast orchestral and choral performances. In the summer of 2013, WKMS partnered with MSU to implement a Teen Leader Radio Project, for high school juniors and seniors in area leadership groups to produce stories for scholarship awards.

In May 2014, repairs on the 91.3 transmitter allowed for improved coverage in Paris, which made the 99.5 repeater redundant. WKMS used additional funds raised by listeners in February 2014 to move the equipment to Murray to become the new classical repeater on 99.5 FM. In mid-December 2014, 99.5 was moved to 88.9 due to signal interference with another station.

== Funding ==
The WKMS operating budget comes from four main sources: MSU appropriations, individual listener contributors, businesses and corporations, and grants from the Corporation for Public Broadcasting administering funds appropriated by the U.S. Congress. The proportion of funding and funding sources vary from station to station across the nation. WKMS listeners provide the major share of that part of the budget which WKMS must raise in order to match support from MSU.

== Events ==
WKMS co-sponsors several events with regional organizations such as MSU's Lovett Live, Land Between the Lakes' Pickin' Party, the Lowertown Art and Music Festival in Paducah, the Pennington Festival in Princeton, Kentucky, concert broadcasts of the Paducah Symphony Orchestra, local schools, and other art agencies. WKMS also hosts an annual "Battle of the Bands" competition in coordination with Maiden Alley Cinema in Paducah and hosts monthly Live Lunches featuring local bands.

== Programming ==
WKMS hosts a diverse programming schedule comprising both national and local news and music programs. WKMS employs a news team, mainly composed of MSU students, to cover news and events in the region in the format of interviews and features that appear in the daily locally produced two-hour-long program Sounds Good. Generally, news and talk programs are heard during weekdays, with arts and cultural programming on weekends. National programming on WKMS includes well-known staples such as Morning Edition, All Things Considered, Science Friday, World Cafe, Wait Wait... Don't Tell Me!, Fresh Air and The Diane Rehm Show.

=== Local programming ===
WKMS staff member Tracy Ross hosting his indie rock show, Beyond the Edge.

WKMS produces several local programs, which focus on regional news or a specific genre of music.

- Beyond the Edge – An eclectic, three-hour mix of folk, rock, pop, alt-country, Americana, blues and other genres, aired weekly with host Tracy Ross. (Saturdays at 8 p.m.)
- Café Jazz – Two hours of mainstream jazz, heard weeknights. The show is hosted by Tracy Ross, Todd Hill, George Eldred and Brian Clardy. (Mondays through Thursdays at 9 p.m.). This program is followed by Jazz Vault, which features archival episodes of Café Jazz and is produced by George Eldred. (Mondays through Thursdays)
- Classical Encore – A twice-weekly two-hour showcase of classical music with host Dr. John Dressler. This production also broadcasts throughout the week on the HD-2 channel. (Sundays at 5 a.m. and 9 p.m.)
- Left of the Dial - A weekly two-hour music program featuring tracks heavily rooted in the underground music scene of the 1980s. Hosted by John Null. (Fridays at 9 p.m.)
- The Jazzman Show – A weekly hour-long music program featuring pioneers and innovators in jazz as well as world jazz and big band music, with host Andy "Jazzman" Smith. (Sundays at 1 p.m.)
- The Jive House – A weekly hour-long music program featuring a mix of blues, soul, and roots music, hosted by volunteers John McMillen and Brad Robertson. (Thursdays at 9 p.m.)
- The Last Splash - A weekly two-hour-long music program featuring alternative, indie and punk rock music, along with local hosts' thoughts and reactions. Hosted by Austin Carter, Tim Peyton, Corbet Hall and Matthew Rowan. (Fridays at 11 p.m.)
- Rick's Kitchen Sink – A weekly two-hour music program featuring a mix of blues, jazz and roots music, hosted by Rick Nance. (Saturdays at 1 p.m.)
- Music from the Front Porch – A weekly staple on WKMS for over 30 years; it is a three-hour music program featuring folk music, bluegrass, acoustic music and western swing, from musicians old and new alike, with hosts John McMillen, Mike Gowen, and Nick Morris. (Saturdays at 10 a.m.)
- Sounds Good – A daily two-hour showcase of conversations with members of the community and a range of adult album alternative, folk, and indie music, hosted by Tracy Ross and staff members. (Weekdays at 11 a.m.)
- Weekend Energy – A weekly two-hour-long music program featuring techno, electro, trance music, drum and bass, and other high-energy styles of contemporary electronica, with host Matt "McG" Markgraf. (Saturdays at 11 p.m.)

=== WKMS HD2 ===
WKMS HD2 airs the nationally syndicated satellite-delivered public radio service, Classical 24, which plays classical music around the clock, produced by Minnesota Public Radio and American Public Media.
