= Phil Cofer =

American basketball player (born 1996)

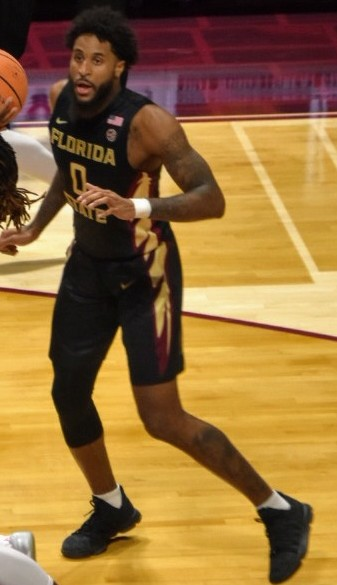
- Cofer playing for Florida State in 2018

Personal information
- Born: June 19, 1996 (age 30) Atlanta, Georgia, U.S.
- Listed height: 6 ft 8 in (2.03 m)
- Listed weight: 230 lb (104 kg)

Career information
- High school: Whitewater (Fayetteville, Georgia)
- College: Florida State (2014–2019)
- NBA draft: 2019: undrafted
- Playing career: 2019–2021
- Position: Power forward

Career history
- 2019–2020: College Park Skyhawks
- 2020: Long Island Nets
- 2020: Memphis Hustle
- 2021: Antwerp Giants

Philip Cofer (born June 19, 1996) is an American former professional basketball player. He played college basketball for the Florida State Seminoles.

== Early life and high school career ==
Cofer is the son of NFL linebacker Mike Cofer. Phil attended Whitewater High School. As a senior, he averaged 19.3 points, 12.8 rebounds and three blocked shots per game in 24 games. He had a season-high 35 point game. He signed with Florida State on May 19, 2014, after decommitting from Tennessee due to the departure of coach Cuonzo Martin. ESPN listed Cofer as the nation's No. 56 player in his class and assigned him a four-star rating.

== College career ==
Cofer averaged 6.9 points and 4.5 rebounds per game as a freshman, making 24 starts. As a sophomore, he played in only 11 games due to a foot injury that shortened his season. When he came back as a junior, he still had not recovered from the lingering effects of the injury, and averaged 2.9 points per game. Cofer greatly improved his ballhandling, three-point shooting and scoring as a senior. "I'm not really sure, I've had another player that I've coached that has made an improvement from one year to another," coach Leonard Hamilton said. He had a career-high 28 points in a 100–93 loss to Duke on December 30, 2017.

As a senior, Cofer led the Seminoles with 12.8 points per game, averaged 5.1 rebounds and played a team-high 29.3 minutes per game and was the only Florida State player to start all 35 games. He was an important piece of the Seminoles' run to the Elite Eight. On May 25, 2018, he was granted an extra year of eligibility by the NCAA due to his injury-shortened sophomore season.

Cofer missed the first nine games of the 2018–19 season with a broken foot. He missed the NCAA tournament opening-round win over Vermont with a foot injury. After the game, he was informed that his father had died, and he missed the rest of the tournament to be with his family. He averaged 7.4 points and 3.5 rebounds per game as Florida State went 29–8 and reached the Sweet 16 in Cofer's redshirt senior season.

== Professional career ==
Following the close of his college career, Cofer signed with the College Park Skyhawks of the NBA G League. He averaged 2.2 points and 2.3 rebounds per game in 23 games. He was waived by the Skyhawks on February 10, 2020. Cofer was acquired by the Long Island Nets, but was waived on February 23 after appearing in one game. On February 28, Cofer was acquired by the Memphis Hustle from the available player pool.

On March 4, 2021, Cofer signed with Telenet Giants Antwerp of the Belgian League. On December 4, 2021, Antwerp Giants announced it had reached an agreement with Cofer to terminate his contract.

== Career statistics ==
Legend
GP	Games played	GS	Games started	MPG	Minutes per game
FG%	Field goal percentage	3P%	3-point field goal percentage	FT%	Free throw percentage
RPG	Rebounds per game	APG	Assists per game	SPG	Steals per game
BPG	Blocks per game	PPG	Points per game	**Bold**	Career high

=== College ===
Year	Team	GP	GS	MPG	FG%	3P%	FT%	RPG	APG	SPG	BPG	PPG
2014–15	Florida State	33	24	22.3	.456	**.400**	.632	4.5	.2	.3	**.6**	6.9
2015–16	Florida State	11	4	12.0	**.565**	.000	**.842**	2.0	.2	.4	.3	3.8
2016–17	Florida State	32	2	12.5	.452	.375	.600	1.9	.2	.1	.1	2.9
2017–18	Florida State	**35**	**35**	**29.3**	.486	.375	.691	**5.1**	.7	**.5**	.2	**12.8**
2018–19	Florida State	22	19	26.2	.391	.349	.571	3.5	**.8**	.1	.1	7.4
Career		133	84	21.6	.459	.366	.662	3.7	.4	.3	.3	7.3
