= Roy Smith (Canadian football) =

American gridiron football player

Ray Smith
Profile
- Positions: Guard, Tackle, Center

Personal information
- Born: c. 1928; Knoxville, Tennessee, U.S.
- Died: December 21, 2008 (aged 79–80); Knoxville, Tennessee, U.S.
- Listed height: 6 ft 3 in (1.91 m)
- Listed weight: 230 lb (104 kg)

Career information
- High school: Rule (TN)
- College: Tennessee

Career history
- 1953–1955: Ottawa Rough Riders

Roy Edward "Looney" Smith (born c. 1928 – December 21, 2008) was an American professional football player who played for the Ottawa Rough Riders from 1953 to 1955. He previously played football at the University of Tennessee.
