= Kentucky Public Radio =

US broadcaster

Coordinates: 38°14′53.7″N 85°45′27.3″W

- Type: Public radio network
- Country: United States
- Broadcast area: Kentucky
- Key people: Managing Editor Ryland Barton Capitol Reporter Sylvia Goodman Enterprise Statehouse Reporter Joe Sonka Data Reporter Justin Hicks
- Launch date: December 1997
- Affiliation: National Public Radio
- Affiliates: WEKU, WFPL, WKYU, WKMS

Kentucky Public Radio (KPR) is a consortium of four public radio stations: WFPL (Louisville), WKMS-FM (Murray), WKYU-FM (Bowling Green) and WEKU (Richmond/Lexington).

The primary mission of Kentucky Public Radio is to facilitate content sharing among stations and the hiring and management of a Capitol reporter, an enterprise statehouse reporter and a data reporter.

KPR is managed by board of directors composed of the individual station managers.

In January 2015. Ryland Barton was named the State Capital Bureau Chief in Frankfort, Kentucky.

== Affiliates ==
Location	Frequency	Call sign	Owner
Richmond	88.9 FM	WEKU	Eastern Kentucky University
Louisville	89.3 FM	WFPL	Louisville Public Media
Bowling Green	88.9 FM	WKYU-FM	WKU Public Radio
Murray	91.3 FM	WKMS-FM	Murray State University
