= Erika Brady =

American folklorist

Academic background
- Education: Indiana University
- Thesis: The box that got the flourishes : the cylinder phonograph in folklore fieldwork, 1890-1937 (1985)

Erika Brady is an American folklorist and radio show host. She is a past-president of the Kentucky Folklore Society Fellows and editor of the journal Southern Folklore.

== Career ==
Brady studied at Harvard University, University of California, Los Angeles, and Indiana University Bloomington. She taught anthropology at Western Kentucky University beginning in 1989 and, as of 2022, has retired from teaching. Brady was the editor of Southern Folklore, a journal published by the University Press of Kentucky, from 1992 though 2000. She was the president of the Kentucky Folklore Society Fellows in 2015.

She worked for the Library of Congress helping preserve and make available its collection of wax cylinder recordings. Her work at the Library of Congress helped transfer audio tracks from wax cylinders onto tapes that could be preserved for future listeners, including songs from Native Americans and French folk songs sung in Missouri.

Her book, A Spiral Way: How the Phonograph Changed Ethnography, was about the impact of phonograph technology on ethnography. She also wrote a book about alternative medicine methodologies. She has also written about healing in Healing Logics: Culture and Medicine in Modern Health Belief Systems which was reviewed by the Western States Folklore Society.

== Outreach ==
Brady hosts the folk music radio show Barren River Breakdown on WKYU-FM. She co-hosted and eventually took over hosting of the radio show Barren River Breakdown which began in 1997. In 2015 she delivered the American Folklore Society's Don Yoder Lecture in Religious Folklife with a speech titled “A Subtle Thing Withal”: Reflections on the Ineffable, the Unspeakable, and the Risible in Vernacular Religion". In 2010 about the significance of full moons in folkways with ABC News.

== Awards and honors ==
In 2002, Brady received the Acorn Award from the Kentucky Advocates for Higher Education. In 2011 she received a Kentucky Governor's Award in the Arts for her work bringing regional music to Kentucky. In 2015, Brady gave the Don Yoder lecture at the American Folklore Society's annual meeting.

== Writings ==
- Brady, Erika (1999). A spiral way : how the phonograph changed ethnography. Jackson, Miss.: University Press of Mississippi. ISBN 0-585-19046-1. OCLC 44954346.
- ————— (2001). Healing logics : culture and medicine in modern health belief systems. Logan, Utah: Utah State University Press. ISBN 0-87421-454-8. OCLC 54439127.
- ————— (2013). "Contested Origins: Arnold Shultz and the Music of Western Kentucky". In Pecknold, Diane (ed.). Hidden in the mix : the African American presence in country music. Durham, NC: Duke University Press. ISBN 9780822394976.
