= The Knoxville Journal =

Daily newspaper published in Knoxville, Tennessee

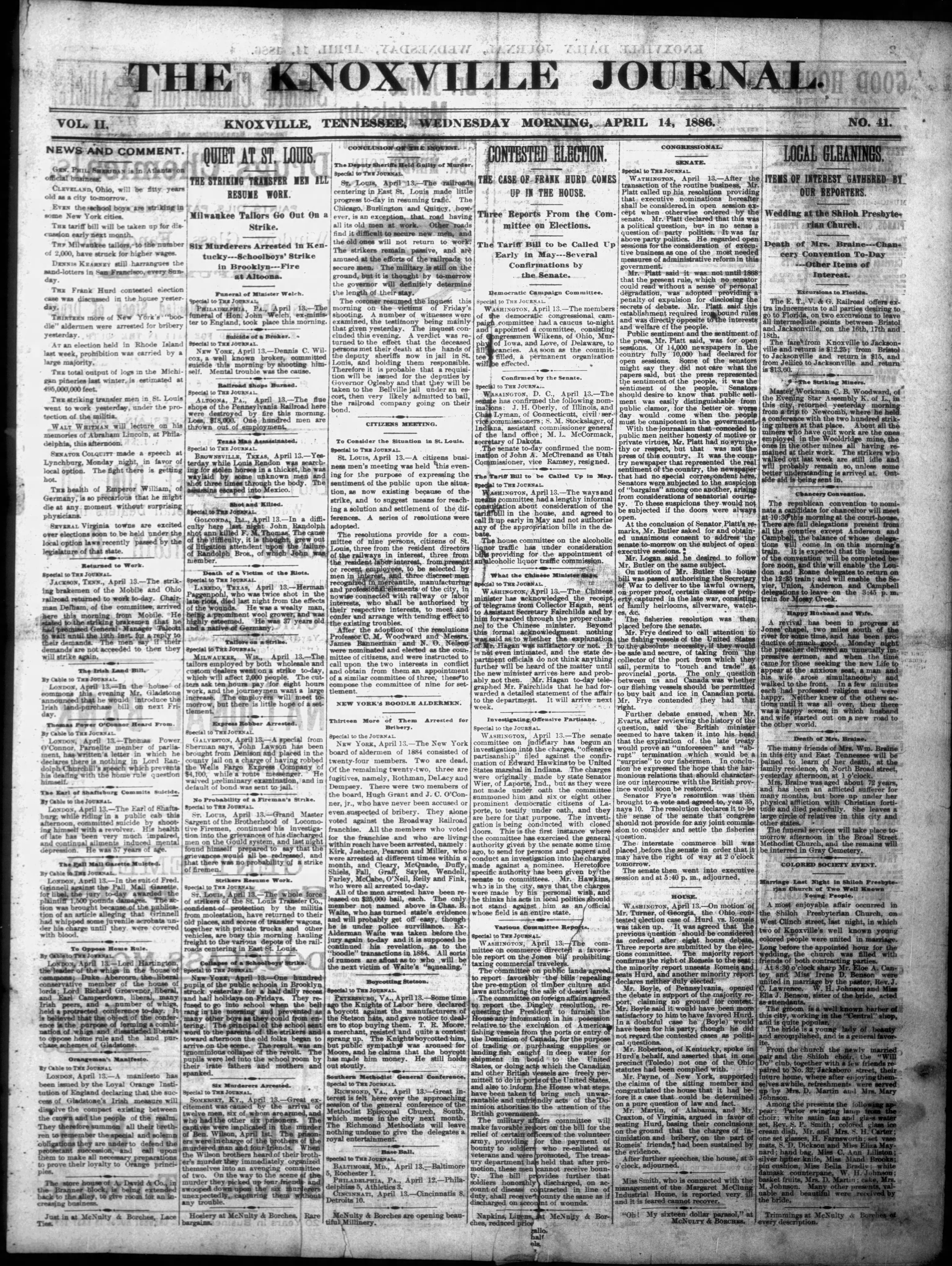
- The Knoxville Journal for Wednesday, April 14, 1886, the first issue bearing this title
- Type: Daily newspaper
- Format: Broadsheet
- Owner: Persis Corporation
- Founded: 1885; 141 years ago
- Ceased publication: December 31, 1991
- Circulation: 40,316 (1990)

The Knoxville Journal was a daily newspaper published in Knoxville, Tennessee, United States, between 1886 and 1991. It operated first as a morning and then as an afternoon publication.

On December 31, 1991, its last owner, the Persis Corporation of Honolulu, shuttered the paper at the end of its joint operating agreement (JOA) with the larger Knoxville News-Sentinel.

== Establishment ==
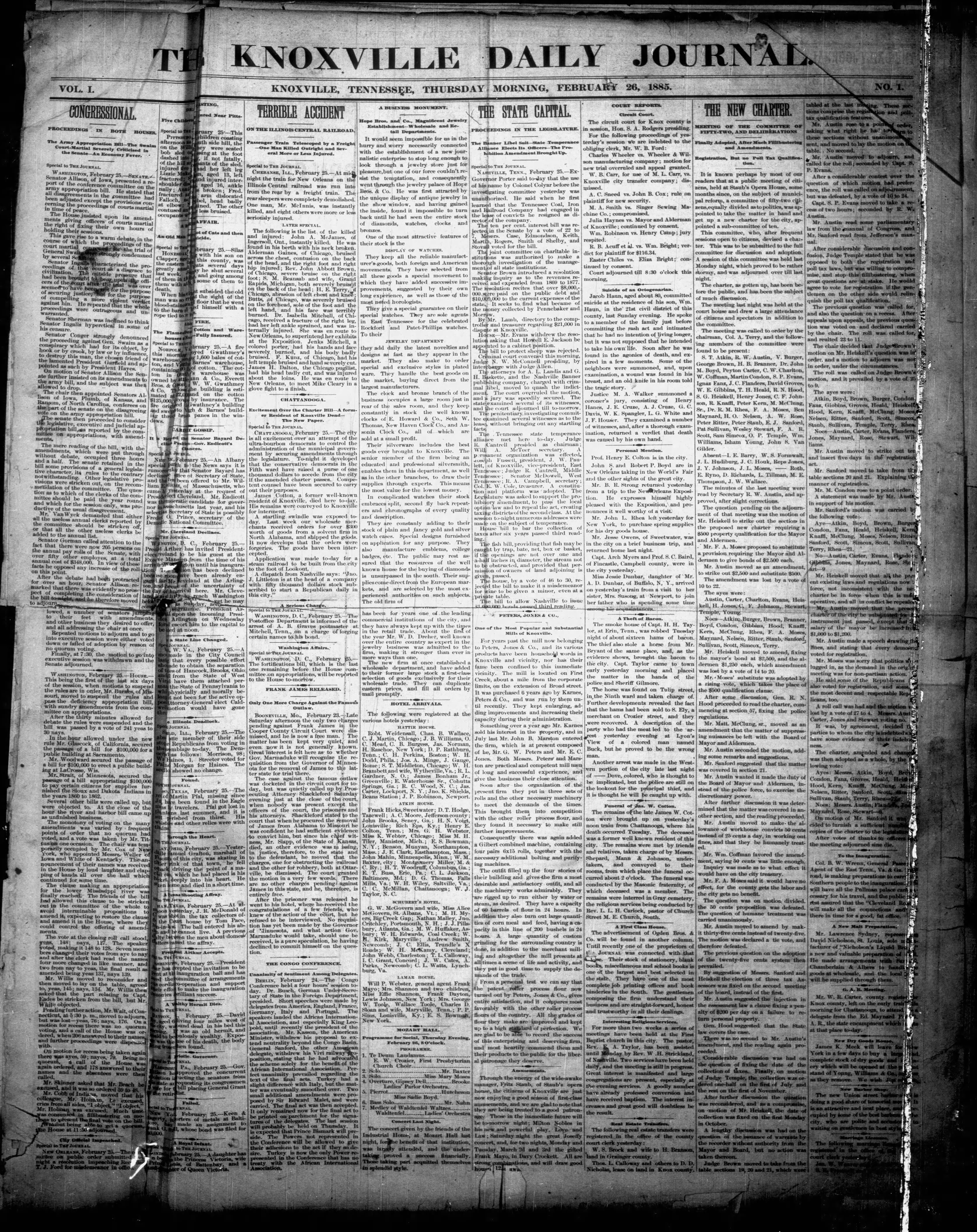
First issue of The Knoxville Daily Journal, Thursday, February 26, 1885

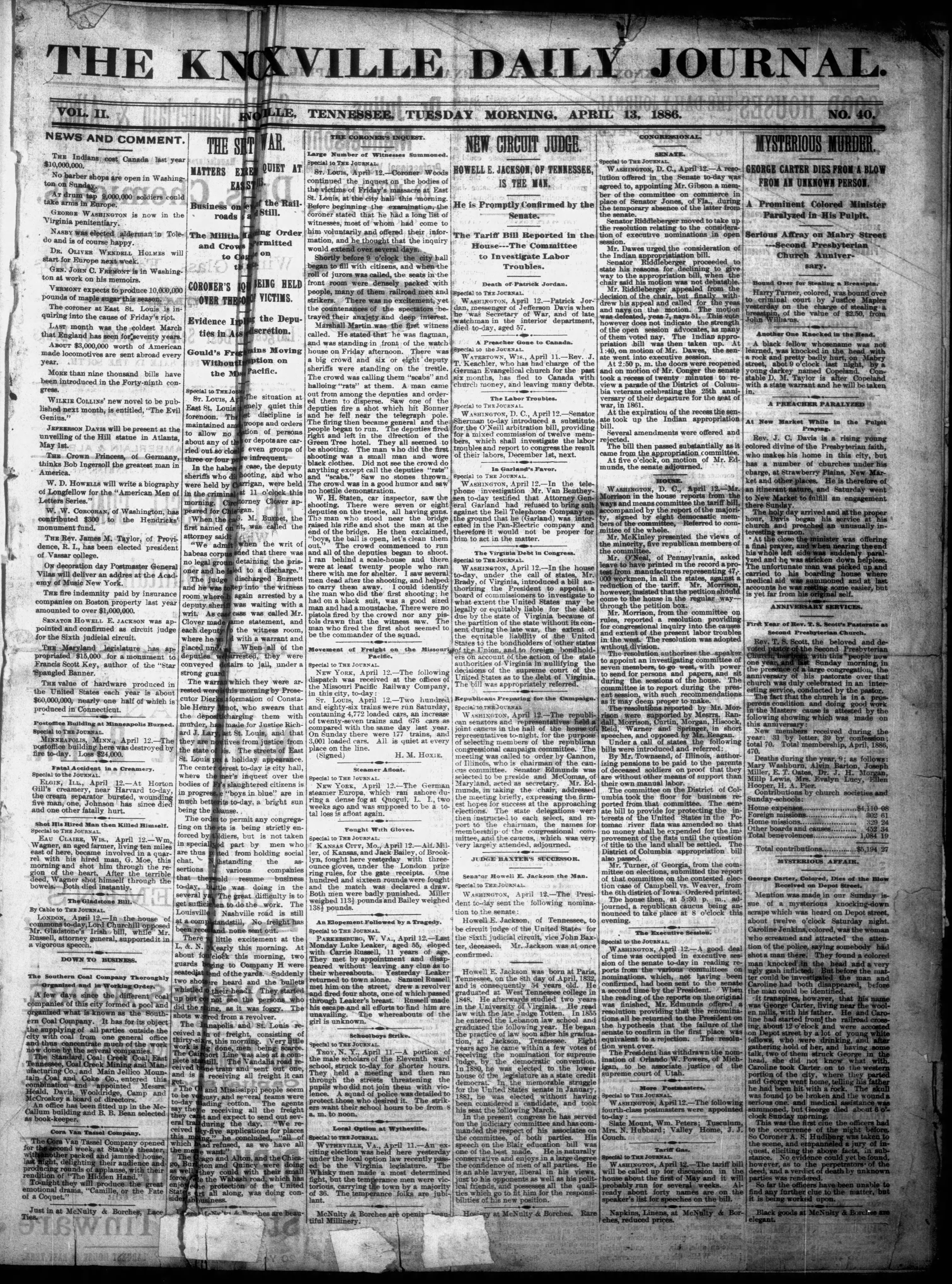
Last issue titled The Knoxville Daily Journal, Tuesday, April 13, 1886

Captain William Rule launched The Knoxville Daily Journal on February 26, 1885, after previous experience in the Tennessee newspaper industry. The paper claimed a history reaching to the Whig in Elizabethton, where Rule worked for William G. Brownlow; the two men had also launched the Chronicle and Whig in the 1870s but sold it in 1882. The title changed to The Knoxville Journal on April 14, 1886. Under Rule, the publication focused on local news; it established a Republican Party editorial stance on most national issues but was generally neutral on political topics of local import. Luke Lea, a Democrat, purchased the Journal in 1928 but retained its existing editorial positions. However, in the wake of the Great Depression, the Journal fell into receivership in 1930.

== Lotspeich ownership ==
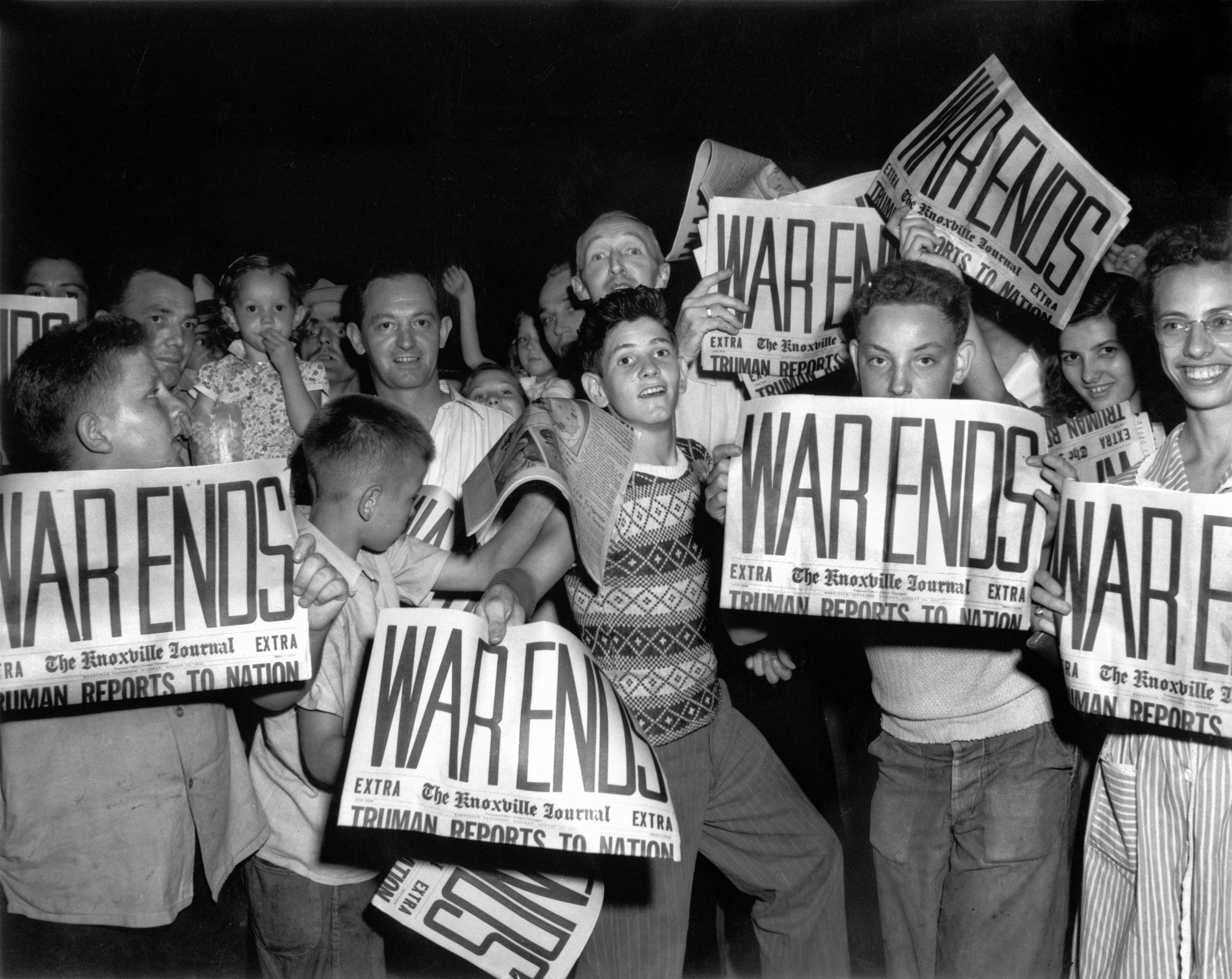
Children from Oak Ridge hold up the extra edition of the Journal from August 14, 1945, proclaiming the end of World War II

After six years, mill owner Roy Lotspeich purchased the Journal in 1936. The next year, Lotspeich hired Guy Smith, a Republican who kindled a more active editorial stance for the newspaper and remained with it until his death in 1968. In local politics, Smith was an advocate for urban renewal and development projects; annexation of surrounding municipalities into Knoxville; and a failed proposal to consolidate Knoxville and Knox County. His most significant crusade, however, was advocating for one person, one vote apportionment in the state legislature, which would favor Republican interests in East Tennessee.

In the late 1940s, the Journal made a brief incursion into broadcasting; it started WKPB (93.3 FM), an early FM station in the city, on October 15, 1947. The Journal, citing the uncertainty created by the advent of television, shuttered the station on April 15, 1949, and sold its equipment to the University of Tennessee at Knoxville (which started WUOT) and its records to the general public.

The Journal published in the morning; in the afternoon, Knoxvillians read the News-Sentinel, owned by Scripps-Howard. The two publications maintained a healthy rivalry and often took opposite sides on issues. It was thus a surprise when, in 1957, the Journal and News-Sentinel entered into a joint operating agreement, combining many back-office functions; only the News-Sentinel published on Sunday.

== Demise ==
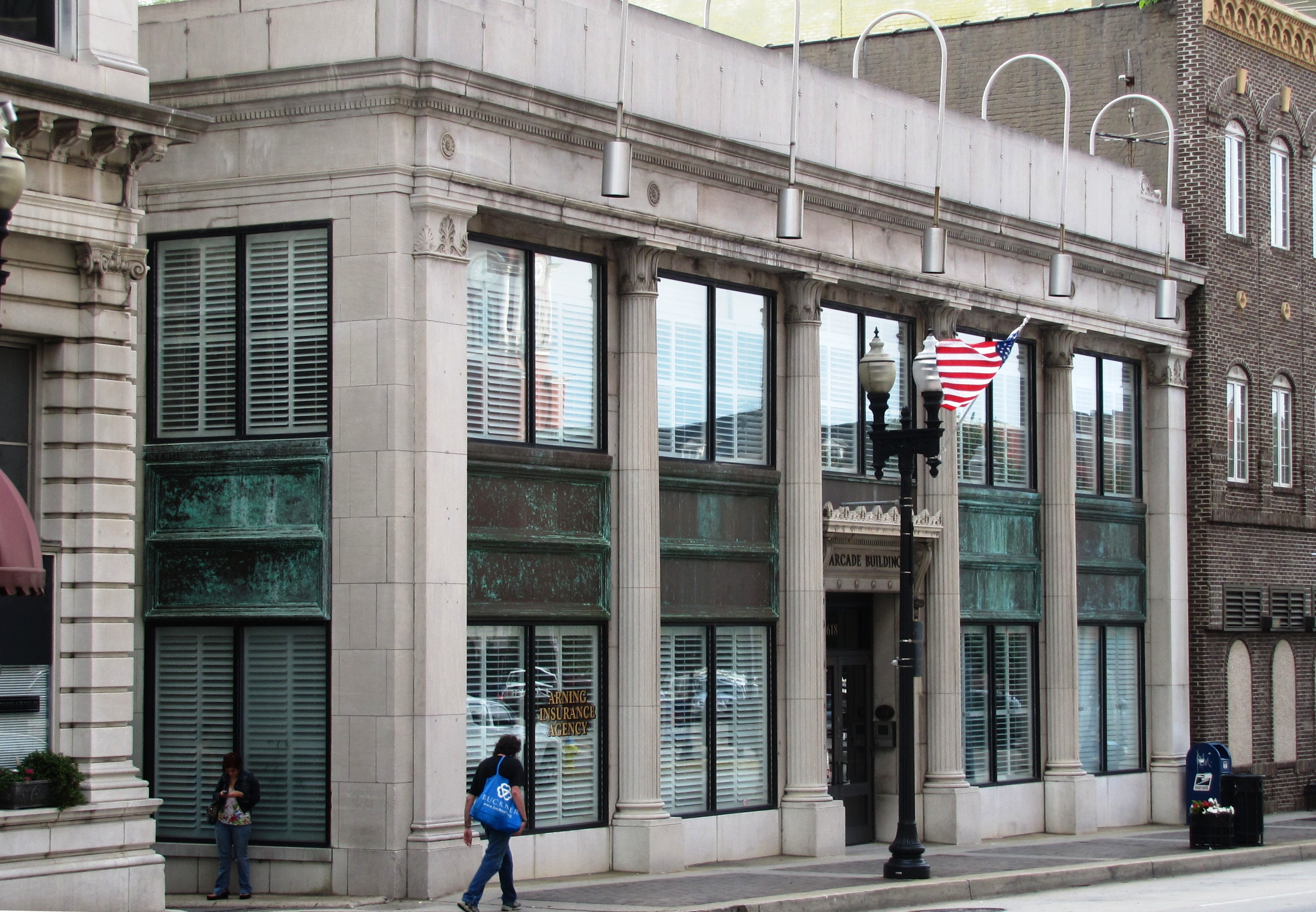
The Journal Arcade, formerly the home of the newspaper's press room, on Gay Street

The Lotspeich family sold the Journal to Gannett in 1981. As part of the renewal of the JOA, in February 1986, Gannett agreed to swap with the News-Sentinel and become an afternoon publication starting June 20, with Gannett receiving an additional 2.5 percent of the joint venture (raising its stake to 25 percent). It then put the Journal up for sale; one source believed Gannett had essentially used the Knoxville publication as leverage to improve its deal in another JOA with a Scripps newspaper in El Paso, Texas. Howard Baker considered a purchase, but Gannett ultimately found a buyer in a consortium of Journal editor Ron McMahan and William C. McKinney, publisher of the Gannett-owned The Reporter in Lansdale, Pennsylvania. McKinney and McMahan sold the newspaper to Thurston Twigg-Smith's Persis Corporation, whose holdings included The Honolulu Advertiser, in 1988; it was the first publication in an eastern state owned by Persis, whose other holdings on the U.S. mainland were all in Washington state.

In December 1989, Persis acquired The Daily Times in Maryville. Scripps alleged that this violated the JOA. It contended that Blount County was part of the marketing area of the News-Sentinel, which had begun producing a regional edition for that area, and that Persis would have information on News-Sentinel marketing strategies that might benefit their new acquisition. As a consequence, Scripps sued Persis, asking for the dissolution of the JOA (which otherwise ran through 2005) or for Persis to lose power to set advertising rates for the Journal. The two parties agreed to dissolve the JOA effective December 31, 1991, with Persis receiving $40 million in payments it would have otherwise received through 2005.

On December 2, 1991, Persis opted to shutter the paper at the end of the month, which also marked the end of the JOA. Per plans that were floated at the time, a new weekend publication, Weekend Journal, would be printed by the Persis-owned Daily Times, a plan that almost failed due to lack of investment; all 69 Journal staff would lose their jobs. In addition, 49 News-Sentinel circulation staff positions were eliminated.

The Weekend Journal only ran until August 28, 1992, when it printed its last edition, citing weak advertising sales due to the early 1990s recession.
