= Stephen Cochran =

American singer and songwriter

- Cochran in June 2009

Background information
- Born: Stephen E. Cochran II; September 17, 1979 (age 47)
- Origin: Pikeville, Kentucky, United States
- Genre: Country
- Occupations: Musician, singer-songwriter
- Instruments: Vocals, guitar, drums
- Years active: 1999 – present
- Label: Aria Records Quarterback Records Epic Record / Arista Nashville Label 22

Stephen Cochran (born September 17, 1979) is an American country music singer and songwriter. In 2009 Stephen was named as a spokesman for the United States Department of Veterans Affairs (VA) Research and Development. The VA and Cochran collaborated to produce a music video for veterans who need help.

== Life and music career ==
Born in Pikeville, Kentucky, Cochran was primarily raised by his single mother Janey Cochran, however when Cochran was four years old, he began spending summers with his grandparents Charles and Lois Maynard in Waterford, Michigan. Some of Stephen's closest friends are from that time in his life and considers Michigan just as much a hometown as Kentucky and Tennessee. After moving from eastern Kentucky to Tennessee, he was raised in Nashville's songwriting and recording community. He watched his father, Steve Cochran, wrestle with the machinery of Music Row as a struggling songwriter and artist. Country greats Bobby Bare and the late Del Reeves are just a few of the characters that influenced Cochran's early music home life. Cochran cultivated an interest in music beginning at Hunters Lane Comprehensive High School in Nashville, Tennessee. Later, he honed his craft in his college days at Western Kentucky University with a development deal. He worked his way through school writing songs and playing guitar. While at WKU he also helped found and played lacrosse.

After September 2001, Cochran joined the United States Marine Corps and served in Iraq and Afghanistan. He was a part of the 2nd Light Armored Reconnaissance Battalion; 1st Marine Expeditionary Force. In July 2004, while on convoy security Cochran was injured, leaving his back broken and without the use of his legs for some time. He was told he may never walk without pain again and he was sent home to the United States. Once he arrived home the search for a solution began. Finally, after a long struggle, Cochran's ability to walk without pain was restored when doctors at the Nashville VA Medical Center performed an experimental procedure called kyphoplasty. After an extensive rehabilitation Stephen was able to return to an active lifestyle. As part of his recovery, Cochran refocused his energy on country music.

Cochran teamed up with other country music artists and began performing with John Rich and the MuzikMafia around Nashville. He wrote with his friend from the band Trailer Choir Vinny Hickerson and eventually, they started their own writers' group. In 2007 he began Armed Forces Entertainment tours of the Middle East, scores of benefit appearances on behalf of his fellow veterans, and constant roadwork in support of his acclaimed, self-titled debut album. In November 2008, Cochran appeared on ABC's Good Morning America to promote the second annual "Salute to the Troops" benefit concert.

In 2009 the VA asked Cochran to be the face of their research and development. He and Mark Melloan wrote "Hope," which the VA used as a theme song in its national campaign to help veterans. The VA hospitals and patients are the backdrops for the video.

I'm one of the only combat vets from this era in country music, and I need to use that platform to help things change and give hope back.

— Stephen Cochran, News Channel 5 WTVF, February 11, 2010

In 2012, Cochran signed a production contract with New Voice Entertainment.

In 2013, Cochran formed the live-music group titled "Stephen Cochran Project" including bandmate "Smitty" Byrne (BGV/Bass). The Stephen Cochran Project released their first self-titled album in 2015.

In 2014, Cochran and fellow veterans turned music makers formed and began touring in support of their not for profit Stop22 tour which then linked to Romans Warrior foundation forming Romans Warrior foundation- Stop22Tour. They use their songs and songwriting to help other's understand the Veterans plight as well as the suicide epidemic that plagues the Veteran Community. "It also helps our fellow veterans heal through our music", said Dean at a concert in 2017 at the Fonanel.

Cochran then teamed up with fellow veteran and longtime friends Michael Hamilton and Daniel Broadrick to put out a non-genre EP titled "American Loser", it includes 6 new tracks all written or co-written by Cochran and Hamilton directed at helping other veterans heal and educate civilians about the veteran lifestyle. Cochran, Hamilton and Broderick continue to make music and are hoping to help many veterans navigate the songwriting maze in Nashville.

In 2020, Cochran was contacted by Hallmark Movies to buy the rights to his life. A movie was written and was awaiting the end of the 2023 writer/actor strike to begin production. Tentatively slated for the summer of 2024. Cochran and longtime friend and producer Michael Hamilton also wrote, produced and performed the soundtrack to "Learning to Walk", a Stephen Cochran story. "Keep Off", the first single off the soundtrack, marked Cochran's first release in six years.

== Personal life ==
Stephen is married to Megan Rae Cochran. They have five kids, Aaron Ryder, Addy Rae, Stephen Eugene III (Tripp), Katherine Ann and Charles Caswell. In August 2021, Stephen's longtime best friend and service dog Semper Fi died due to complications with cancer. At the end of that month Stephen's mother Janey Cochran and his grandmother Lois Maynard contracted COVID-19. Stephen's grandmother died on September 5 followed by his mother's death October 9. The three of them were Stephen's biggest support and best friends; he always referred to them as "His Ladies".

== Discography ==
=== Albums ===
- Stephen Cochran (2007)
- "Leaving Louisiana" (Walmart Flowers) (2010)
- "Pieces" (2012)
- "Stephen Cochran Project" (2015)
- "American Loser" {Americana}(2017)
- "Learning to Walk " Hallmark Movies soundtrack (2023)

=== Singles ===
- "Friday Night Fireside" (2007)
- "Everything We Knew" (2008)
- "Thinkin I'm Drinkin" (2008)
- "Wal-Mart Flowers" (2009)
- "Alone on Christmas" (2010)
- "Hope" (2011)
- "Pieces" (2012)
- "Gasoline on a Goodbye" (2014)
- "She'll thank me Later" (2015)
- "Whiskey Lies" (2016)
- "American Loser"(2017)
- "Keep On " (2023)

=== Music videos ===
- "Friday Night Fireside" (2007)
- "Pieces" (2012)
- "Hope" VA R&D theme song (2009)
- "She'll thank me later" (2015)
- "Whiskey Lies" (2015)
- "Keep On" (2023)

=== Collaborations ===
- Lindsey Cardinale's 2009 single, "Always on My Mind"
- Annabelle Bainum's 2010 single, "Alone on Christmas"
