= WKU Public Radio =

Regional network of public radio stations in Kentucky, United States

- Western Kentucky; United States
- Broadcast area: Bowling Green; Henderson; Owensboro; Somerset; Campbellsville; Elizabethtown
- Branding: WKU Public Radio

Programming
- Format: Public radio, talk and classical
- Affiliations: NPR; APM; PRX; Kentucky Public Radio

Ownership
- Owner: Western Kentucky University
- Sister stations: WKYU-TV, WWHR

History
- First air date: January 14, 1980

Links
- Website: wkyufm.org

WKU Public Radio is the public radio service of Western Kentucky University in Bowling Green, Kentucky. It is a division of the Department of Information Technology at WKU. The network consists of four FM radio stations and one FM translator. Combined, the stations cover most of Western Kentucky and parts of Indiana and Tennessee, reaching into the northern suburbs of Nashville.

== History ==
WKYU-FM signed on for the first time in November 1980 as the first public radio station for south central Kentucky. The station was spearheaded by Dr. Chuck Anderson, who had experimented with a carrier current radio station on campus at WKU since 1975.

The inception of WKYU-FM, broadcasting at 88.9 megahertz, did not come without controversy; in its first several months on the air, the station's airwaves caused some local residents to experience the station's audio overlaying with the visual reception of the "Big 3" television stations based in Nashville, Tennessee (ABC affiliate WNGE (channel 2, now WKRN-TV), NBC affiliate WSM-TV (channel 4, now WSMV-TV) and CBS affiliate WTVF (channel 5)), which all broadcast on the lower-VHF band. It even prompted residents of nearby Butler County to file a class-action federal lawsuit against the university in February 1981; the suit was dismissed in June of that year due to insufficient evidence.

Over the next ten years, WKYU would expand its coverage through three satellite stations. WDCL-FM signed-on in 1985 to serve areas of southeast central Kentucky around Somerset and Campbellsville from a tower in Adair County. WDCL obtained its calls from longtime public radio supporter Daniel Cole. In 1990, two more stations were launched to joined the network: WKUE-FM in Elizabethtown and WKPB for the Ohio River communities of Henderson and Owensboro.

The network was known as Western's Public Radio, airing mostly classical music during the day. However, on August 31, 2009, it rebranded itself as WKU Public Radio, and began airing mostly news and talk during the day. Prior to the sign-on of WKYU-FM, the only portions of the coverage area that had a clear signal from an NPR station were Henderson and Owensboro, which received NPR programming from WNIN-FM in Evansville, Indiana, and some southern Kentucky counties along the Kentucky–Tennessee state line, where WPLN-FM is received from Nashville.

In 2016, WKYU-FM signed on a new classical music radio service on a new FM translator station, W248CF, broadcasting at 97.5 megahertz. That translator airs classical music 24 hours a day. Since its signal does not reach too far outside of Warren County, it is repeated on WKYU-FM's second HD channel, and also streams live on the Internet.

== Programming ==
WKU Public Radio airs news and informational programming on weekdays, with classical music heard at night. Weekends feature informational shows by day, with jazz on Saturday nights and specialty music programs Sunday evenings. Saturdays and Sundays at noon, Erika Brady hosts the "Barren River Breakdown" show. WKU Public Radio is an affiliate of National Public Radio, with shows from American Public Media and the Public Radio Exchange also heard.

== Stations ==
The network consists of four full-power stations and two FM translators, all located in Kentucky and simulcasting the same programming at all times. Together, the five main stations reach 65% of Kentucky, including the fringes of the Louisville and Lexington areas. The stations also serve portions of Indiana, Illinois and Tennessee. Much of this area is composed of rural areas and small towns; Evansville, Indiana is by far the largest city in the region.

Callsign	Frequency	Location	FID	ERP (W)	HAAT	Class	Transmitter coordinates	Sign on date	Callsign meaning	Notes
WKYU-FM	88.9 FM	Bowling Green	71856	98,000	219 m (718.50 ft)	C1	37°5′23″N 86°38′5″W	January 14, 1980	Western Kentucky University	Flagship station of WKU Public Radio; also serves north-central Tennessee
WKPB	89.5 FM	Henderson / Owensboro	71864	43,000	115 m (377.30 ft)	C2	37°51′6.1″N 87°19′43″W	April 1, 1990	Western Kentucky Public Broadcasting	Also serves southwest Indiana and southeast Illinois, including Evansville and Carmi
WDCL-FM	89.7 FM	Somerset / Campbellsville	71857	100,000	174 m (570.87 ft)	C1	37°9′29.9″N 85°9′49.8″W	July 1985	Daniel Cole	
WKUE	90.9 FM	Elizabethtown	71860	5,200	190 m (623.36 ft)	C3	37°44′42.2″N 85°53′21.9″W	October 15, 1990	Western Kentucky University Elizabethtown	Grade B coverage available in Louisville

Broadcast translator for WDCL-FM
Call sign	Frequency	City of license	FID	ERP (W)	HAAT	Class	Transmitter coordinates	FCC info
W277AA	103.3 FM	Somerset, Kentucky	71859	250	89 m (292 ft)	D	37°7′3.3″N 84°36′41.8″W	LMS

Broadcast translator for WKUE
Call sign	Frequency	City of license	FID	ERP (W)	HAAT	Class	Transmitter coordinates	FCC info
W275BT	102.9 FM	Frankfort, Kentucky	153212	250	56 m (184 ft)	D	38°15′35.2″N 84°51′20.8″W	LMS

WKU Public Radio's network coverage area.
