= Nick Bruno =

Nick Bruno may refer to:

- Nick Bruno (academic administrator) (born 1951), eighth president of the University of Louisiana at Monroe
- Nick Bruno (film director), American film director and animator
