= University of Louisiana at Monroe =

Public university in Monroe, Louisiana, U.S.

- Former name: List: Ouachita Parish Junior College (1931–1934) Northeast Center of Louisiana State University (1934–1949) Northeast Junior College of Louisiana State University (1949–1950) Northeast Louisiana State College (1950–1969) Northeast Louisiana University (1969–1999)
- Motto: "Seek the Truth"
- Type: Public university
- Established: September 28, 1931; 94 years ago
- Parent institution: University of Louisiana System
- Accreditation: SACS
- Academic affiliations: Space-grant
- President: Carrie Castille
- Students: 8,678 (fall 2025)
- Undergraduates: 6,772 (fall 2025)
- Postgraduates: 1,906 (fall 2025)
- Location: Monroe, Louisiana, United States; 32.527°N 92.074°W
- Campus: 238 acres (0.96 km^{2}); Small city
- Newspaper: The Hawkeye
- Colors: Maroon and gold
- Nickname: Warhawks
- Sporting affiliations: NCAA Division I FBS – Sun Belt
- Mascot: Ace the Warhawk
- Website: www.ulm.edu

The University of Louisiana at Monroe (ULM) is a public university in Monroe, Louisiana, United States. It is part of the University of Louisiana System. It is made up of four colleges: the College of Business and Social Sciences; College of Pharmacy; College of Arts, Education and Sciences; and College of Health Sciences. ULM enrolled 8,678 students in fall 2025, including 1,680 graduate students.

== History ==
ULM opened in 1931 as Ouachita Parish Junior College. Three years later it became the Northeast Center of Louisiana State University. In 1936 and 1937, its dean was Stephen A. Caldwell.

Its name changed again in 1949, to Northeast Junior College of Louisiana State University. A year later, it became an autonomous four-year institution as Northeast Louisiana State College. In 1969, it granted doctoral degrees for the first time and was elevated to university status as Northeast Louisiana University (NLU).

In 1999, Northeast Louisiana University (NLU), under university president Lawson Swearingen, agreed to a controversial name change of the university. It was changed so that two schools would change to "University of Louisiana" and a geographical indicator in their name, as required by a 1995 state law that allowed the change if two or more schools in the University of Louisiana System agreed to it. Northeast Louisiana University would be renamed to University of Louisiana at Monroe (ULM) and University of Southwestern Louisiana would be renamed to University of Louisiana at Lafayette (ULL).

=== 21st century ===
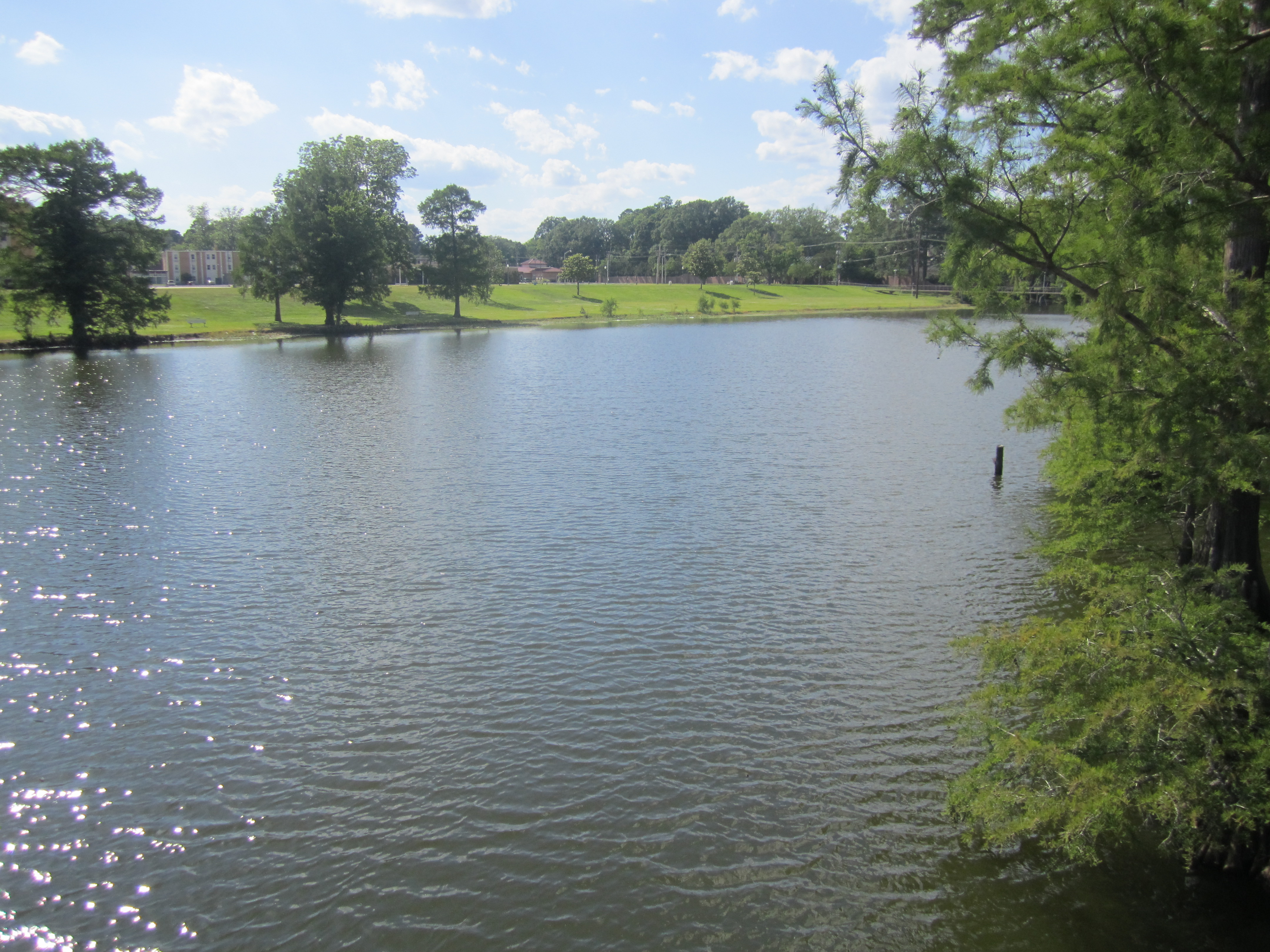
Bayou Desiard crosses the ULM campus.

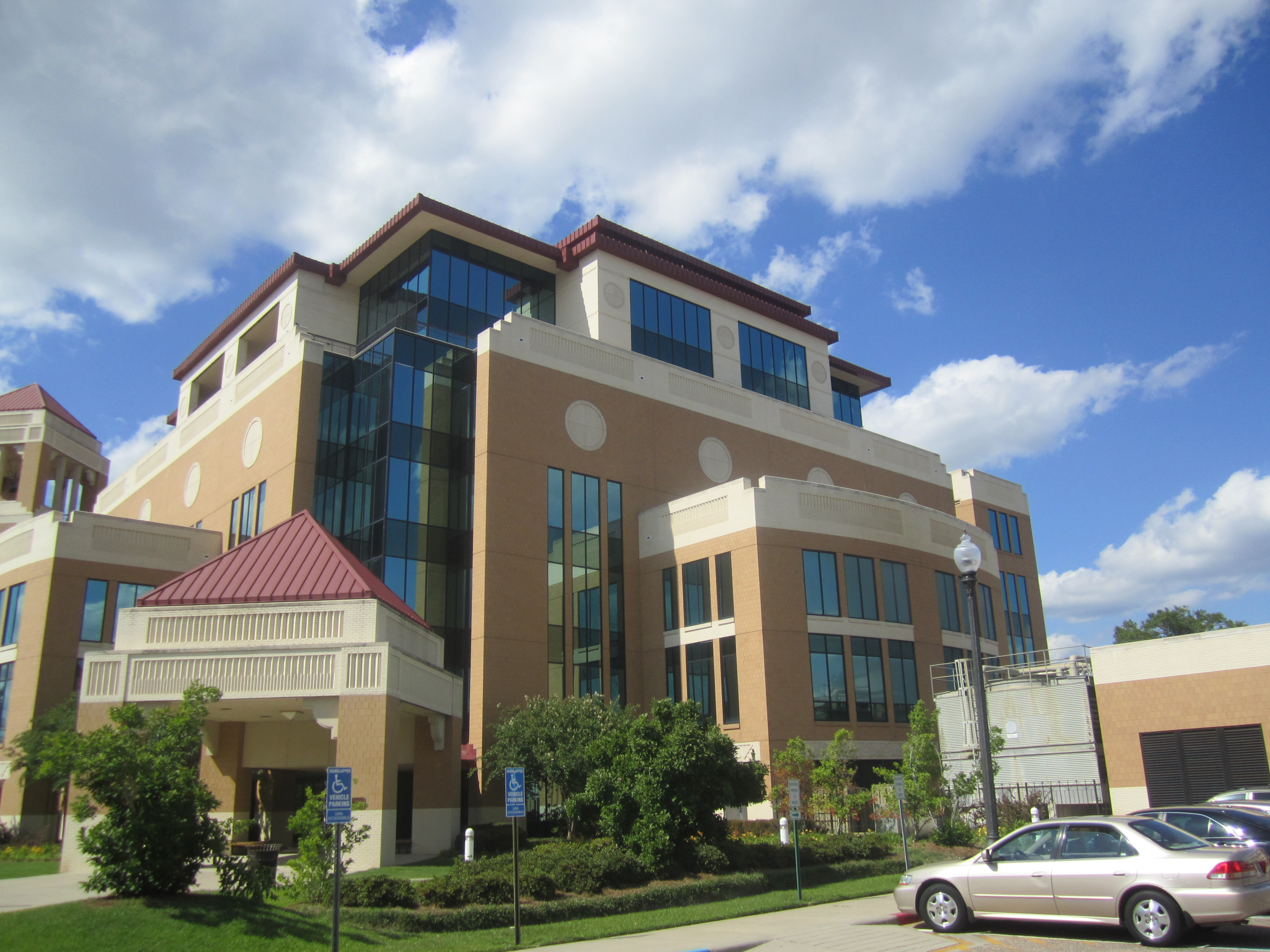
ULM Library and Conference Center

A 2002 "Reclaim Our Campus" effort targeted recovery from financial and auditing difficulties.

In 2010, James Erwin Cofer Sr., left the ULM presidency after eight years to head Missouri State University in Springfield, Missouri. He was succeeded by Nick Bruno as the eighth president of ULM.

In 2016, ULM was recognized as a military and veteran friendly campus by the state of Louisiana as a result of the approval of House Bill 485.

In 2025, Carrie Castille was named the 10th president of ULM and first female president. Following her appointment as president, Castille helped ULM and Louisiana Delta Community College improve the transfer process for students in applied sciences.

== Academics ==
=== Department of Atmospheric Science ===
The Department of Atmospheric Science at the University of Louisiana at Monroe (ULM), in Monroe, Louisiana, offers the only four-year undergraduate meteorology program in the state. It is housed in the School of Sciences within the College of Arts, Education, and Sciences and has been designated a "Program of Unique Excellence" by the Louisiana Board of Supervisors. The program is notable for owning and operating a polarimetric S-band Doppler weather radar, acquired through state homeland security funding and brought into operation in the mid-2010s. Students and faculty routinely launch weather balloons from campus in advance of hazardous weather, transmitting data to the National Weather Service to support nowcasting and short-term forecasting in northern Louisiana.

=== College of Business ===
The College of Business and Social Sciences (CBSS) seeks to prepare students for productive careers and responsible citizenship. It encompasses four colleges and provides 20 different programs.

=== Marriage & Family Therapy ===
The University of Louisiana at Monroe (ULM) first developed a master's degree program in marriage and family therapy in 1981 and first joined the ranks of COAMFTE accredited master's degree programs in marriage and family therapy in 1986. The ULM MA in MFT program is accredited by the Commission on Accreditation for Marriage and Family Therapy Education (COAMFTE), and has been continuously since 1986.

The Ph.D. Program in MFT, developed in 1995 and implemented in 1996, has been accredited by COAMFTE since 2007. As of spring, 2025, the program has graduated more than 100 Ph.D. 's in MFT. Master's in marriage and family therapy is accredited by both the Commission on Accreditation for Marriage and Family Therapy Education and The Council for Accreditation of Counseling and Related Educational Programs. A doctoral program in marriage and family therapy was approved by the Louisiana Board of Regents in June 1995.

The Ph.D. degree program in Marriage and Family Therapy at University of Louisiana at Monroe prepares graduates for careers as scholars/teachers, researchers, supervisors and senior clinicians. The 69 credit-hour program integrates systemically oriented philosophy and theory, clinical practice, and qualitative and quantitative research. ULM is one of only a few universities in the U.S. that offers both a M.A. and a Ph.D. in Marriage and Family Therapy, (COAMFTE).

=== College of Pharmacy ===
In the early fifties, there was a significant shortage of pharmacists in Louisiana. On August 11, 1956, the 5th District Pharmaceutical Association, former college president Lewis C. Slater, and others approved a pharmacy school at Northeast Louisiana State College. By 1970, a new facility was built for the School of Pharmacy and was named Sugar Hall, in honor of the late Leon Sugar, a sponsor of the pharmacy program. The Bachelor of Science program in Toxicology was initiated in 1982 and is to this day one of six toxicology programs in the U.S. In July 2005, the School of Pharmacy separated from the College of Health Sciences to form the College of Pharmacy. By 2007, the College of Pharmacy moved from the main campus to the off-campus (Bienville) building. The ULM Pharmacy program is currently the only publicly supported center in Louisiana for pharmaceutical education and research.

The college is in a 132,000 square foot, three-story building with modern classrooms, health service facilities, and research labs.

In 1999, a New Orleans physician and philanthropist Milburn E. Calhoun honored his parents with the establishment of the Mary E. and Darrell L. Calhoun Endowed Chair. With gifted funds of a total of $1 million.

A couple of years later, the Calhoun family gave another $50,000 through an estate gift to the chair, which is above $1 million. In the year of 2025, the Louisiana Legislature approved a $2 million supplement to enhance the operation and research programs of the College of Pharmacy.

=== Student Organizations ===
The University of Louisiana at Monroe (ULM) supports student life through its numerous student organizations (RSOs) that actively promote leadership, service and cultural engagement.

Student governing organizations actively lead and organize events for students to attend. The Student Government Association (SGA) advocates for student needs and manages resources. Meanwhile, the University Activities Board (UAB) plans and executes social events and campus festivities.

The 31 Ambassadors are a carefully selected group of students who actively lead their services at alumni meetings and campus events. Named after the university's founding year of 1931, they represent ULM and the Alumni Association. Members gain exclusive leadership opportunities and networking occasions.

ULM also offers students valuable hands-on experience in journalism and publishing. The Hawkeye is a weekly student publication that covers campus news, sports, arts and entertainment and opinion articles. In partnership with The Hawkeye, ULM's student yearbook, The Chacahoula is produced annually, offering students snapshots and recaps of the year's highlights.

Academic excellence is recognized at ULM through many different honor societies. Phi Kappa Phi promotes achievement across all fields of higher education while actively engaging with the community. Some other notable honor societies include the National Society of Collegiate Scholars (NSCS), Pi Sigma Alpha (Political Science) and Sigma Tau Delta (English). These organizations recognize and celebrate academic excellence in countless fields.

=== Theater Arts ===
ULM is home to the Emy-Lou Biedenharn Recital Hall, named for the opera singer and daughter of the Coca-Cola entrepreneur Joseph A. Biedenharn.

=== Natural History Museum ===
The university's Natural History Museum was home to the 6-million-specimen Neil Douglas fish collection and the 500,000-specimen R. Dale Thomas plant collection. In March 2017, museum staff announced that they had been told the collections would have to be divested to enable an expansion of the university's stadium, and that any specimens which had not been relocated to other institutions by July 2017 would be destroyed. The specimens were subsequently distributed to other institutions, with the plant collection going to the Botanical Research Institute of Texas, the herpetological collection to the University of Texas at Arlington, the entomological collection to Mississippi State University, and the ichthyological collection to Tulane University.

== Athletics ==
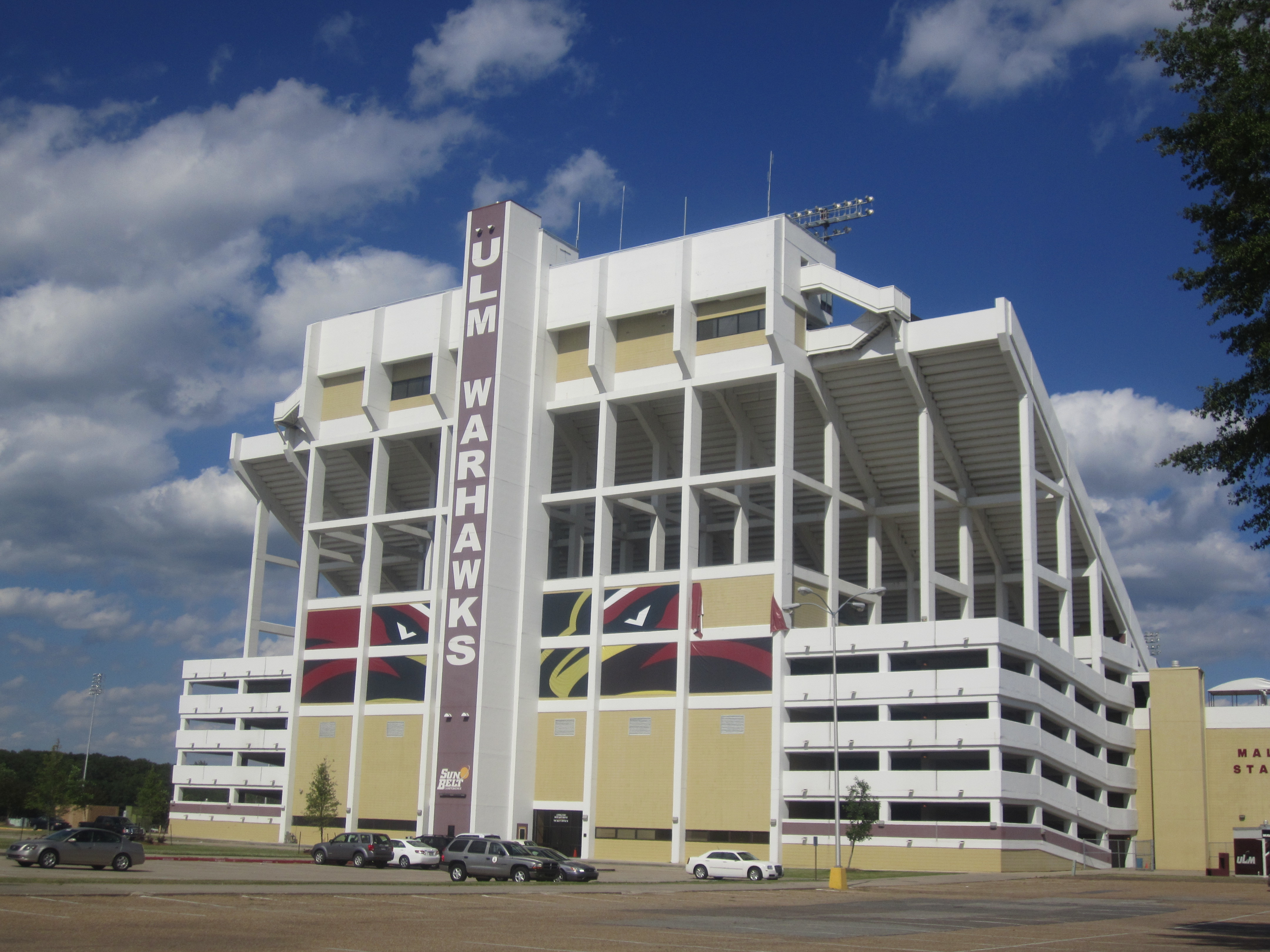
ULM Warhawks Stadium

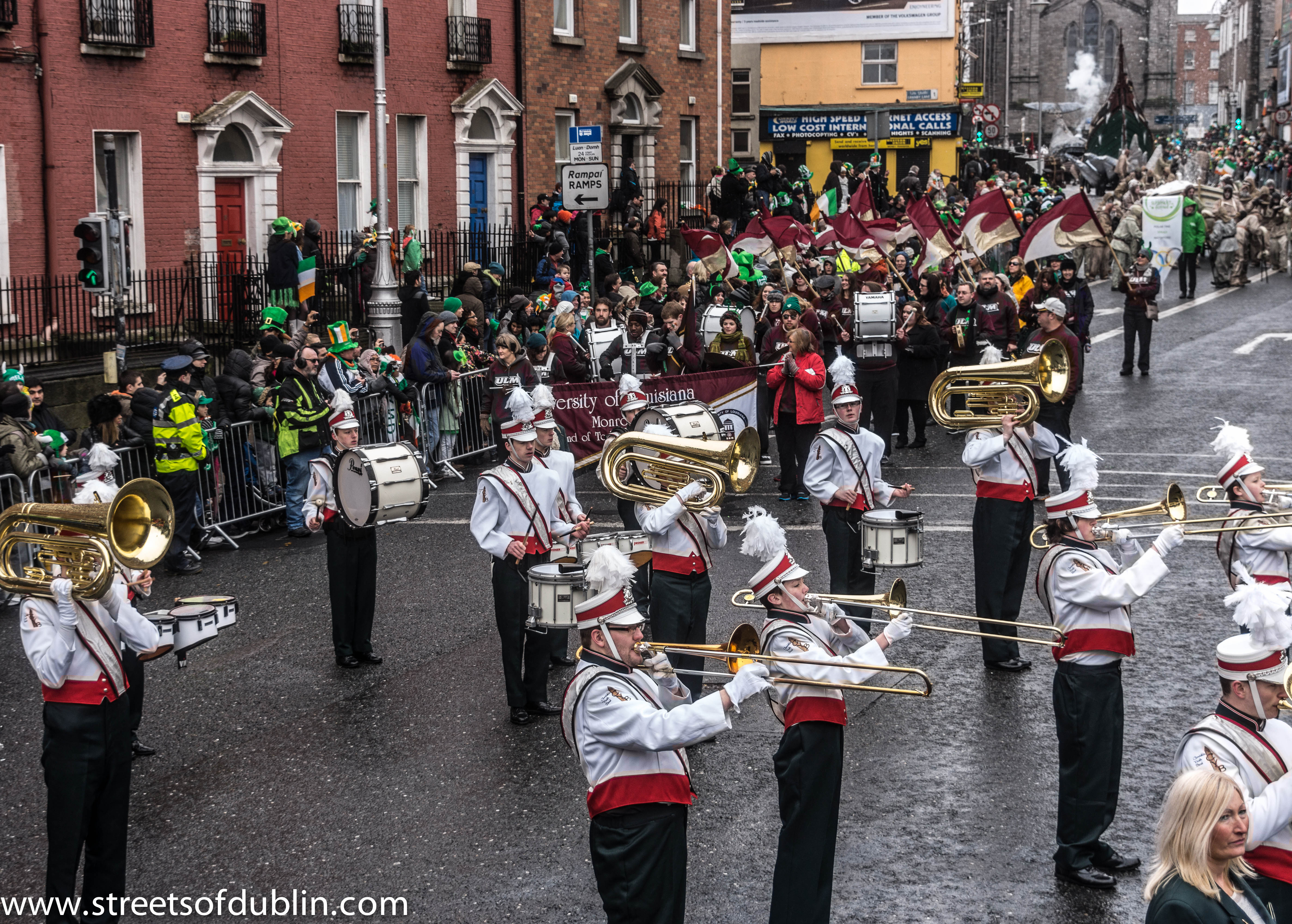
St. Patrick's Day Parade (2013) - ULM's Sound of Today band

ULM athletic teams participate in NCAA Division I (Division I FBS for football). ULM joined the Sun Belt Conference for all sports on July 1, 2006, after playing in the Southland Conference in all sports except football (swimming and diving team was in Sun Belt Conference, but was dropped in 2005). The school's sports teams previously competed as the Indians until 2006.

ULM students also participate in the Sound of Today marching band and the competition cheerleading squad.

== Residence halls and apartments ==
ULM has eight campus-based residencies for students. They are a mix of traditional residential halls, private rooms, and apartments. These residences include Madison Hall, Ouachita Hall, the University Commons, University Suites, Bayou Suites, Bayou Village Apartments, Masur Hall, and Warhawk Village Apartments. To live on campus, ULM students are required to hold a minimum GPA (varying from 2.0 to 3.3 depending on the residence), as well as full-time student status.

== Greek life ==
ULM Fraternity and Sorority Life includes the three following governing councils: National Panhellenic Conference, National Pan-Hellenic Council, and North American Interfraternity Conference. ULM recognizes fourteen Greek organizations - four fraternities within the Interfraternity Council, three sororities within the College Panhellenic Conference, and seven sororities and fraternities within the National Pan-Hellenic Council - each of which is a campus chapter of a national group.

== Notable alumni ==
Notable alumni include:

- Businessmen: Tim Brando, Marc Swayze, Willie Robertson, Rob Redding, and Joey Arbogast
- Entertainers: Tim McGraw
- Football players: Chris Harris, Marty Booker, Stan Humphries, Stepfret Williams, Jimmy Edwards, Joe Profit, Roosevelt Potts, Bubby Brister, and Doug Pederson, head coach of the Jacksonville Jaguars and formerly the Philadelphia Eagles
- Baseball players: Wayne Causey, Ben Sheets, Terry Mathews and Chuck Finley
- Basketball players: Kristy Curry and Calvin Natt
