= KSMU =

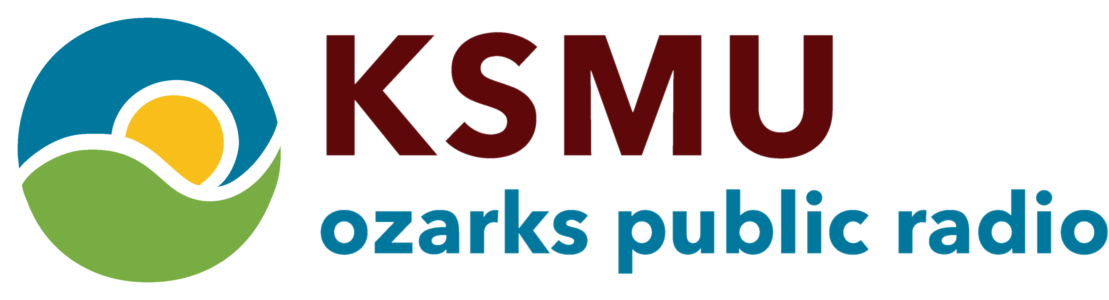
- Springfield, Missouri; United States
- Broadcast area: Southwest Missouri
- Frequency: 91.1 MHz (HD Radio)
- Branding: Ozarks Public Radio

Programming
- Format: Public radio
- Subchannels: HD2: Jazz "Jazzworks"
- Affiliations: NPR

Ownership
- Owner: Missouri State University; (Board of Governors of Missouri State University)
- Sister stations: KOZK

History
- Call sign meaning: Southwest Missouri State University former university name

Technical information
- Licensing authority: FCC
- Facility ID: 4210
- Class: C2
- ERP: 40,000 watts
- HAAT: 125 meters (410 ft)

Links
- Public license information: Public file; LMS
- Webcast: Listen live
- Website: ksmu.org

KSMU (91.1 FM) is a listener supported radio station broadcasting a Public Radio format. KSMU is licensed to Missouri State University in Springfield, Missouri, United States.

The station signed on in 1974, owned by what was then Southwest Missouri State University. In 1998, KSMU moved into Strong Hall on the Missouri State University campus on South Holland Avenue in southern Springfield.

== Programs produced ==
Each week, staff and volunteers contribute their passion for an assortment of musical genres, everything from Bluegrass to Folk.

- The Choral Tradition, an hour long showcase of more than five centuries of great choral music from both secular and liturgical traditions.
- Since 1982 The Gold Ring has brought traditional Celtic and British Isles music to the Ozarks, from the pioneers of the 1920s and 30s to today's leading Celtic folk musicians.
- The Mulberry Tree, hosted by local Springfield musician Emily Higgins, brings eclectic musical selections from singer-songwriters, and musicians of various folk and folk-pop genres.
- World Beat Broadcast is a mixture of Western pop and rock with world folk music traditions, basically anything with a beat.
- The Basement hosted by DJ Imperial is one of the country's longest running hip hop and urban influenced radio programs since 1993.

As the widest broadcasting public radio station in South-West Missouri, KSMU produces a number of local news and arts programs related to the Ozarks

- Arts News gives a run-down of upcoming events within the arts, and interviews with artists, performers, directors, and administrators of the local arts scene.
- Engaging the Community is a monthly program with Missouri State University president Clifton "Clif" Smart discussing the influence of national and international events on the university and local community
- Making a Difference: Stories of Hope and Help is produced in cooperation with the Community Foundation of the Ozarks and inspired by NPR's StoryCorps and shares personal experiences of need and generosity in the Ozarks.
- Studio Live is a monthly live music program with local musicians performing at the KSMU studios.
- History of the Ozarks used to be weekly radio show talking about the history of the Ozarks hosted by Patrick Needham

== Repeaters ==
- KSMW at 90.3 FM in West Plains (HD Radio)
- KSMS-FM at 90.5 FM in Point Lookout (HD Radio)
- K204FX at 88.7 FM in Mountain Grove
- K279AD at 103.7 FM in Neosho
