= Nick Bruno (academic administrator) =

American academic (born 1951)

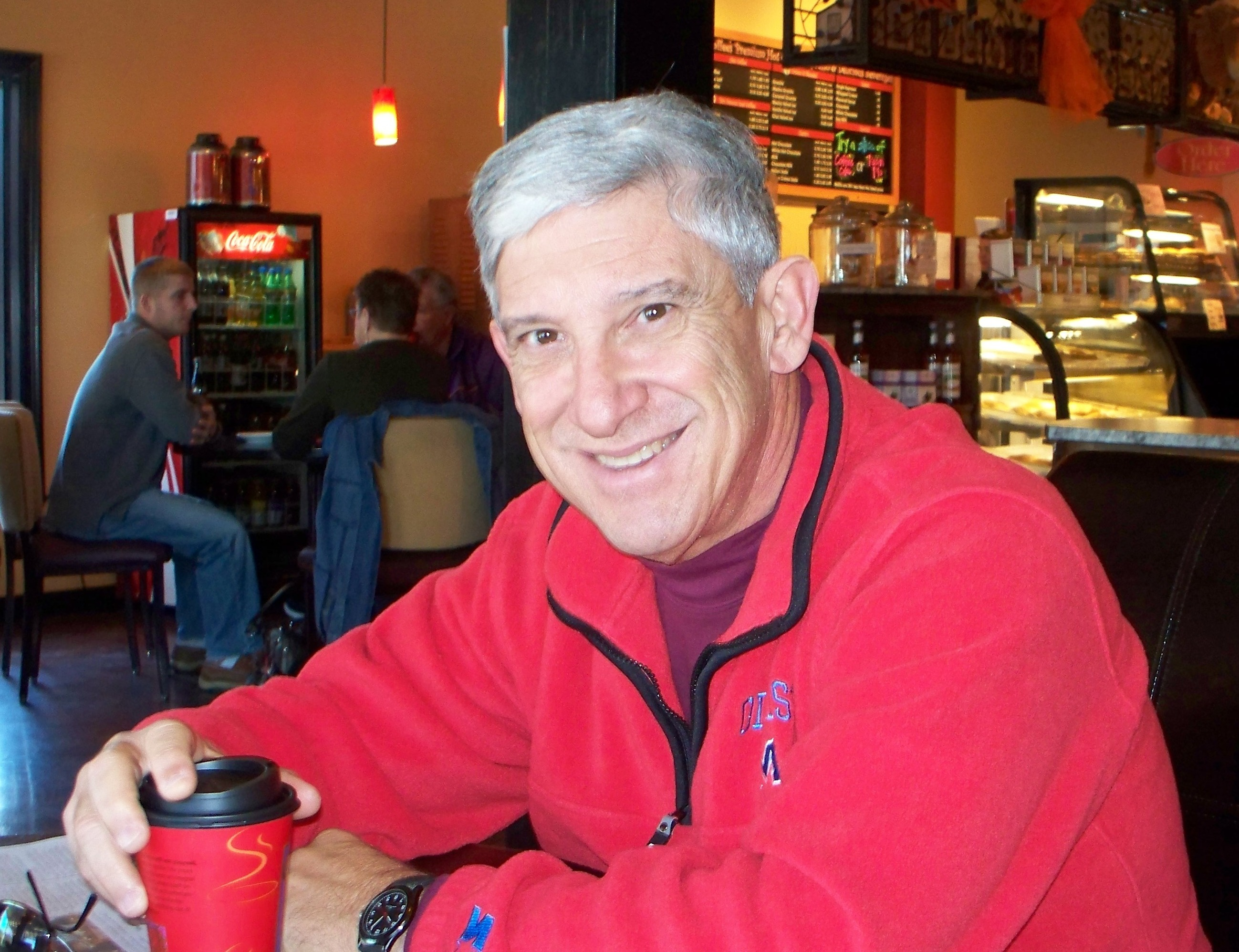
- Dr. Nick J. Bruno, eighth president of the University of Louisiana at Monroe, is an aficianado of PJ's Coffee.
- Born: June 4, 1951 (age 75); Independence; Tangipahoa Parish; Louisiana, United States
- Education: University of Mississippi; Southeastern Louisiana University
- Known for: University of Louisiana at Monroe president Business instructor Cattle farmer
- Awards: Lifetime Achievement Award (National Association of College Auxiliary Services, Southern Region)
- Scientific career
- Fields: Accounting
- Workplaces: University of Louisiana at Monroe; University of Louisiana System; Southeastern Louisiana University
- Doctoral advisor: Ray Cleere

Nick Joseph Bruno (born June 4, 1951) has been the president of the University of Louisiana at Monroe, also known as ULM, since November 8, 2010. He was appointed by the Baton Rouge-based University of Louisiana System Board of Supervisors. Bruno is the eighth president of ULM. He succeeded James E. Cofer Sr., who had resigned to become president of Missouri State University. Bruno's selection was made official in an announcement by University of Louisiana System president Randy Moffett. Bruno's official investiture was on October 2, 2011.

== Background ==
Bruno acceded to the presidency of ULM, formerly known as Northeast Louisiana University, after he had served for five years as vice president for Business and Finance in the University of Louisiana System office in Baton Rouge. He was from 2002 to 2005 the ULM Associate Vice President for Business Affairs and then Vice President for Business Affairs. From 1978 to 2002, he was adjunct instructor of management at Southeastern Louisiana University in Hammond and held a variety of administrative roles, including director of auxiliary services and assistant vice president for special initiatives.

Bruno received his baccalaureate degree in 1972 in accounting from Southeastern Louisiana University. He obtained his Ph.D. in 1994 from the University of Mississippi at Oxford in administration of higher education. He also received the Master of Business Administration in 1980 from the University of Mississippi. His doctoral dissertation is titled A Comparative Analysis of Comments from Faculty Members of Selected Public and Private Universities in Mississippi and Louisiana to Determine the Degree of Job Satisfaction as Related to the Variables of Institution, Gender, and Race. His major professor was Ray Cleere. Bruno is a 1968 graduate of Independence High School in his hometown of Independence, Louisiana. In a 2013 article Bruno commented on various attributes of his background including his upbringing as an Italian American, relatives, and positive associations with the Phil Robertson family and others in the Monroe area.

== Challenges ==
Sue Nicholson, a leader of the Monroe Chamber of Commerce who had worked with Nick Bruno during his previous administrative role at ULM, had this to say:

He's very much a people person. . . . In his division (business affairs) there was a lot of camaraderie. He had this sense of purpose in his team. He takes great pride in getting things done.

Bruno cited looming state budget cuts among the challenges facing ULM. Bruno seeks "to involve as many parties as possible in decisions that impact the future of the campus and the community."

Bruno had the support of Monroe's city administration and local and state officials who cited financial concerns in urging his appointment as competition for the position was intense. Monroe's NBC affiliate KTVE Channel 10 televised interviews with students after Bruno's appointment.

== Activities ==
Previously Bruno and his younger brother Carlo Bruno were involved in the beef cattle business. Carlo Bruno continues in that operation. Nick Bruno is a member of Beta Alpha Psi and Knights of Columbus.

== Personal life ==
Nick Bruno is married to the former Linda Capra, an alumnus and former administrator at the University of Texas at Austin. The couple has two children, Victoria and Christina. Nick also has a son, Steven, from a previous marriage. Bruno is Roman Catholic.

== Notes ==
Preceded by James E. Cofer Sr.	President of the University of Louisiana at Monroe; 2010–	Succeeded by Incumbent
