= Sound of Today =

Marching band of the University of Louisiana at Monroe

- School: University of Louisiana at Monroe
- Location: Monroe, LA
- Conference: Sun Belt
- Founded: 1932
- Members: 100+
- Fight song: "ULM Fight Song"

The Sound of Today (SOT) is the name of the marching band at the University of Louisiana at Monroe (formerly Northeast Louisiana University, Monroe, Louisiana).

Began under band director Jack W. White in 1970. Another name for the "Sound of Today" is "the House that Jack Built."

According to Jack White, band director emeritus, the name arose during a contest in the early-1970s to find a name for the band. He received a brochure from a music company advertising arrangements that would "give your band the sound of today." He realized that the name fit perfectly and named the band the Sound of Today.

What is now the Sound of Today began with 23 student musicians Sept. 21, 1932. E. Lowery Jefferson was their first director.

The original members were: Dale Cobb, Robert Taylor, David Hunt, Harold Miles, Willard Fisher, J.F. Jones Jr. (secretary-treasurer), Lloyd Guy, Ernest Brossett, Carl L. Wood, Frank Wadsworth, Harold Wilenzick, Wallace Olmstead, Vincent Fazio, W.A. McConnell (president), W.W. Sullivan Jr., Alfred Boyd (vice president), Ernest Guy, J.A. Sullivan, Byron Bayne, Keeney Devereux, Harold Hunt, Raymond Masling and J.T. Lewis. Students Louise Grymes and Gladys McGee served as sponsors.

This band played at football games on Oct. 7, Nov. 11 and Nov. 24, 1932, at the new T.O. Brown Field and gave a public concert Feb. 15, 1933.

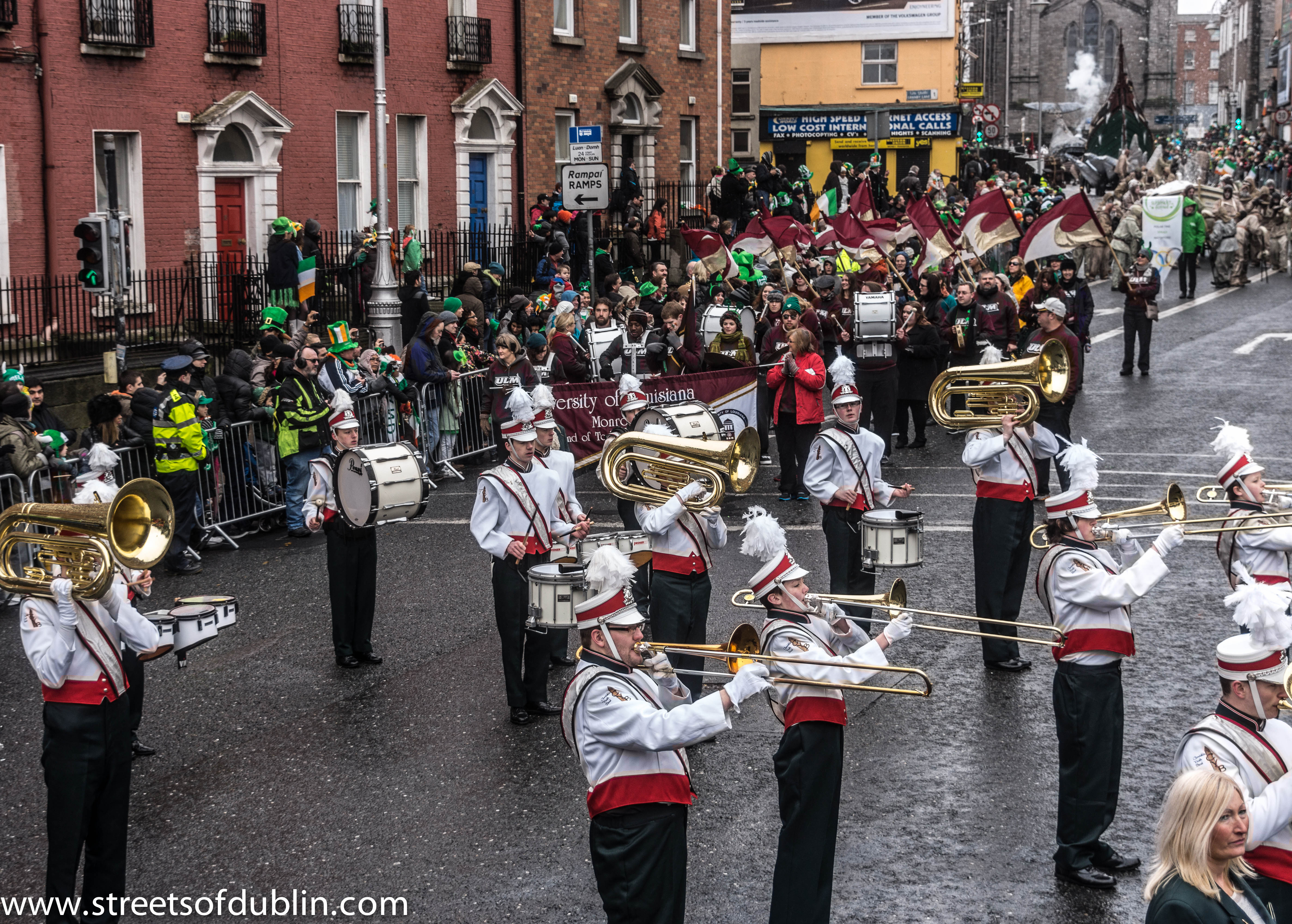
ULM's Sound of Today band at St. Patrick's Day Parade (2013)

Over the years there have been a number of directors of the marching band including, in order, Jefferson, Harry Lemert, Ralph Reschar, Harvey Nelson, Francis H. Burke, Joe Barry Mullins, B. Mack Hearne, Lowery Riggins, White and Steven Pederson. Mullins' and White's service as directors covers a total of more than 31 years. Dr. Derle Long was the director of the Sound of Today in the early-2000s. Jason Rinehart became the director of athletic bands in 2007, and in 2016, Steven Pederson returned to direct the Sound of Today. In December 2012, The University of Louisiana at Monroe made their first Bowl Game appearance ever, in the Advocare Independence Bowl. The football team was supported at several events leading up to the Independence Bowl game by the Sound of Today.

During the 1970s, the band grew to more than 300 members. Each year the Sound of Today produced an album of its "greatest hits", music from the half time shows of that football season. Unlike modern marching bands and corps, who develop one show and repeat it all season, the Sound of Today produced an entirely new halftime show for every home game in a season. The band was known for the quality of its music and for the precision of its drills. In the mid-1970s the band marched in 8-to-5 and used a knees-up bicycle step and mark time. With the uniform's white shoes, this produced flashy movements the crowds enjoyed. In subsequent years, the band moved to a corp-style step allowing for faster, more complex forms on the field. The excellence maintained by the program resulted in routine trips to play halftime shows for the New Orleans Saints in the Super Dome. These shows were recorded "live" on that year's album.
