= James E. Cofer =

10th president of Missouri State University
- In office 2010–2011

President of the University of Louisiana at Monroe
- In office 2002 - 2010

Personal details
- Born: James Erwin Cofer; 1949 (age 76–77) Vicksburg, Mississippi, U.S.
- Spouse: Deborah A. Cofer
- Education: Mississippi State University; University of Arkansas at Little Rock
- Occupation: Administrator, professor

James Erwin Cofer, Sr. (born 1949), is a former president of both Missouri State University in Springfield, Missouri, and the University of Louisiana at Monroe, Louisiana.

He served as the tenth president of Missouri State University and eight years previously at the University of Louisiana at Monroe. His tenure at Missouri State came during a difficult economic period. According to Missouri State's official account of his presidency, Cofer "opened up the budget process, balanced the budget without cutting the academic departments even in light of the state appropriation reductions, gave equity raises to 40 percent of the faculty and started the process of raising the pay grades and salaries for staff. The new long-range plan, Fulfilling Our Promise, was successfully completed under his watch. He also initiated a review of the General Education Curriculum, expanded the campus’s thinking about ways in which to offer courses and he pushed for greater emphasis on student learning outcomes."<5> Cofer resigned after eleven months as president because of what he called "the rigors of the schedule.". After a twelve-month sabbatical, Cofer was eventually reassigned to the faculty in the College of Business at a salary of $165,000 per year (his salary as President was $275,000 per year). He received a Fulbright scholarship for the 2014–2015 academic year.

From 2002 to 2010, he was president of ULM. He previously held faculty appointments at the University of Missouri in Columbia, University of Arkansas at Little Rock, Mississippi College in Clinton, Mississippi, Jackson State University in Jackson, Mississippi, and Mississippi State University in Starkville, from which he obtained the Bachelor of Science and MBA in business administration. He received the Ed.D. in administration of higher education from UALR in Little Rock, Arkansas. Eisenhower Fellowships selected Cofer as a USA Fellow in 1995.

Cofer came to ULM in 2002, when that institution was experiencing severe financial and audit problems, having succeeded Lawson L. Swearingen, Jr., a former member of the Louisiana State Senate, in the top position. He led successful efforts incrementally to return the University to solvency and generally accepted auditing standards. His "Reclaiming Our Campus" campaign effectively consolidated cooperation from the faculty, staff, students, alumni, and community in restoring a sense of pride and became a case study for ACT Survey Sources.

Cofer is married to Deborah A. Cofer, whose assistance to refugees from Hurricane Katrina led to her being chosen as the "Business & Professional Person of the Year" by the Monroe/West Monroe Business and Professional Women's organization. Although not damaged per se by the hurricane, ULM was affected by Katrina, with the campus serving as a major refugee site; additionally, President Cofer initiated an unprecedented winter session (during the normal Christmas holidays) so that students could take courses from which they had been uprooted during the Fall 2005 semester.

Preceded by Lawson L. Swearingen, Jr.	President of the University of Louisiana at Monroe; 2002–2010	Succeeded by Nick Bruno
