= Ozarks Public Television =

PBS member network in Missouri, U.S.

KOZK and KOZJ
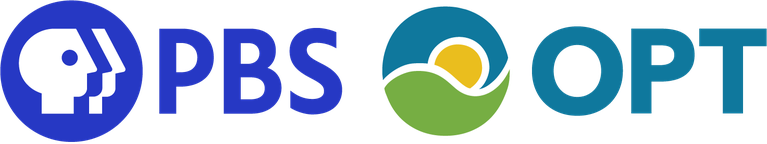

KOZK: Springfield, Missouri; KOZJ: Joplin, Missouri–Pittsburg, Kansas; United States
- Channels for KOZK: Digital: 16 (UHF); Virtual: 21
- Channels for KOZJ: Digital: 35 (UHF); Virtual: 26
- Branding: Ozarks Public Television

Programming
- Affiliations: 21.1/26.1: PBS; for others, see § Subchannels

Ownership
- Owner: Missouri State University; (Board of Governors of Missouri State University)
- Sister stations: KSMU

History
- First air date: KOZK: January 20, 1975; KOZJ: June 1, 1986
- Former channel number: KOZK: Analog: 21 (UHF, 1975–2009); Digital: 23 (UHF, until–2018); KOZJ: Analog: 26 (UHF, 1986–2009); Digital: 25 (UHF, until 2018)
- Call sign meaning: KOZK: Ozarks; KOZJ: KOZK Joplin

Technical information
- Licensing authority: FCC
- Facility ID: KOZK: 51102; KOZJ: 51101
- ERP: KOZK: 105 kW; KOZJ: 68 kW
- HAAT: KOZK: 584 m (1,916 ft); KOZJ: 281 m (922 ft)
- Transmitter coordinates: KOZK: 37°10′26″N 92°56′28.1″W; KOZJ: 37°4′34.9″N 94°32′16.4″W

Links
- Public license information: KOZK: Public file; LMS; KOZJ: Public file; LMS
- Website: www.optv.org

Ozarks Public Television (OPT) is a group of two PBS member television stations in Missouri, United States: KOZK (channel 21) in Springfield and KOZJ (channel 26) in Joplin. They are owned by Missouri State University alongside NPR member KSMU (91.1 FM) in Springfield, and their combined signals cover the Ozarks region of southwestern Missouri, southeastern Kansas, northwestern Arkansas and far northeastern Oklahoma. OPT maintains studios at Strong Hall on the Missouri State campus on South Holland Avenue in southern Springfield. KOZK's transmitter is located on Highway FF north of Fordland, while KOZJ's transmitter is on West 13th Street/Junge Boulevard in northwestern Joplin.

== History ==
KOZK's history can be traced to the founding of Springfield Community Television, a nonprofit group that was formed in 1974 to bring public television to the area. At the time, it was standard practice for PBS to offer its programming to commercial television outlets in markets without a PBS station of their own. For instance, Springfield NBC affiliate KYTV (channel 3) and Joplin ABC affiliate KODE (channel 12) aired Sesame Street at 9 a.m. during the week. After securing a license from the Federal Communications Commission (FCC) and funding from various groups, Springfield Community Television was able to launch its first station. KOZK first signed on the air on January 20, 1975, broadcasting from a former Naval Reserve center located on the campus of Drury University. From there, the station originally broadcast five days a week with seven employees on its staff (augmented by a lot of student volunteerism), eventually expanding to a 24-hour operation with 25 employees. The station borrowed transmitter space from Springfield CBS affiliate KOLR (channel 10).

On June 1, 1986, KOZJ signed on from Joplin as KOZK's sister station. Its business offices are located in downtown Joplin, with its broadcasting equipment located at Missouri Southern State University. Prior to that station's sign-on, the Joplin–Pittsburg market had been one of the few markets in the United States that did not have a PBS member station of their own, although PBS programming could be received over the air via KOED-TV (in the southwestern portion of the market), KTWU-TV (in the northwestern portion), or via KOZK (in the eastern portion).

In 1990, the station moved its operations to the new Shewmaker Communications Center on the campus of Drury College. In 2001, the board agreed to sell the station to Southwest Missouri State University (now Missouri State University); later that year, the station's operations moved to Strong Hall on the MSU campus. Two years later, in 2003, KOZK moved its transmitter facilities to a 1,980-foot (600 m) broadcast tower located on Switchgrass Road in rural southwestern Webster County (north of Fordland), which was donated to the university by KYTV station management.

On April 19, 2018, at about 9:32 a.m., the KOZK transmission tower collapsed as maintenance was being done on the structure. The maintenance involved upgrades to the tower in preparation for the station's upcoming allocation shift under the spectrum repack. The six-person maintenance crew employed with Columbia, South Carolina–based Tower Consultants Inc., who were working replacing crossbeams at about the 105-foot (32 m) mark of the tower as they began to realize that the tower had likely become structurally unstable, vacated the tower shortly before it collapsed. One worker, 56-year-old Stephen Lamay, died from injuries sustained when he became trapped under the tower debris. Three other workers were transported to area hospitals with non-life-threatening injuries and were subsequently released.

While KOZK's signal was off the air, it continued to be available to Mediacom subscribers via a direct auxiliary feed transmitted by fiber optic to the cable provider; service was restored to AT&T U-verse and DirecTV customers by April 20, while it was unavailable on Dish Network (as of April 23, 2018). The tower was also used by local NOAA Weather Radio station WXL46, whose signal also went off-air.

In March 2020, KOZK and KOZJ added World Channel to 21.4 and 26.4, respectively.

== Technical information ==
=== Subchannels ===
The stations' signals are multiplexed:

Subchannels of KOZK and KOZJ
Subchannel		Res.	Short name	Programming
KOZK	KOZJ	Res.	Short name	Programming
21.1	26.1	1080i	OPT HD	PBS
21.2	26.2	480i	OPTKIDS	PBS Kids
21.3	26.3	480i	Create	Create
21.4	26.4	480i	World	World
21.5	26.5	Audio only	KSMU	KSMU

=== Analog-to-digital conversion ===
On June 12, 2009, as part of the federally mandated transition from analog to digital television, Ozarks Public Television shut down the analog transmitters of its two stations. Listed below are the post-transition channel allocations for each analog transmitter:

- KOZK shut down its analog signal, over UHF channel 21, on June 12. The station's digital signal remained on its pre-transition UHF channel 23, using virtual channel 21.
- KOZJ shut down its analog signal, over UHF channel 26, on June 12. The station's digital signal remained on its pre-transition UHF channel 25, using virtual channel 26.

As a part of the broadcast frequency repacking process following the 2016–2017 FCC incentive auction, KOZK was to relocate its digital signal to UHF channel 23 to UHF 16 by the November 30, 2018, deadline for the first group of television stations designated for repacking to shift to new digital allocations; KOZJ was to relocate its digital signal from UHF channel 25 to UHF 35 by the April 12, 2019, deadline for the second group of stations eligible for repacking to re-allocate. KOZK continues to display its virtual channel number as 21, while KOZJ continues to display its virtual channel as 26. As of September 1, 2018, KOZJ relocated to UHF channel 35. KOZK relocated to UHF channel 16 on September 17 in coordination with KYTV.
