= Missouri State University =

Public university in Springfield, Missouri, US

- Former names: Fourth District Normal School (1905–1919); Southwest Missouri State Teachers College (1919–1945); Southwest Missouri State College (1945–1972); Southwest Missouri State University (1972–2005)
- Type: Public university
- Established: 1905
- Academic affiliations: CUMU
- Endowment: $193 million 2024
- President: Richard "Biff" Williams
- Provost: Clarenda Phillips
- Academic staff: 1,124
- Administrative staff: 1,350
- Students: 23,418
- Location: Springfield, Missouri, United States; 37.19971°N 93.28079°W
- Campus: Urban, 225 acres (91.1 ha)
- Colors: Maroon and white
- Nickname: Bears and Lady Bears (women's basketball only)
- Sporting affiliations: NCAA Division I – Conference USA
- Mascot: Boomer Bear
- Website: missouristate.edu

Missouri State University (MSU or MO State), formerly Southwest Missouri State University, is a public university in Springfield, Missouri, United States. Founded in 1905 as the Fourth District Normal School, it is the state's second-largest university by enrollment, with 23,418 students in the fall semester of 2023. The school also offers associate degree programs at two-year campus in West Plains, Missouri, and a bachelor's degree in business programs at Liaoning Normal University in China. The university operates a fruit research station in Mountain Grove, Missouri, and a Department of Defense and Strategic Studies program in Arlington, Virginia.

== History ==
Missouri State University was formed as the Fourth District Normal School by legislative action on March 17, 1905, spearheaded by local businessman, John T. Woodruff. He lobbied for Springfield to be chosen out of 13 other communities. Woodruff gathered 200 area businesspeople, secured $41,000 in funding, and assisted the committee in settling on the "Headly tract". Like other normal schools of the day, the school's primary purpose was the preparation of teachers for the public school system.

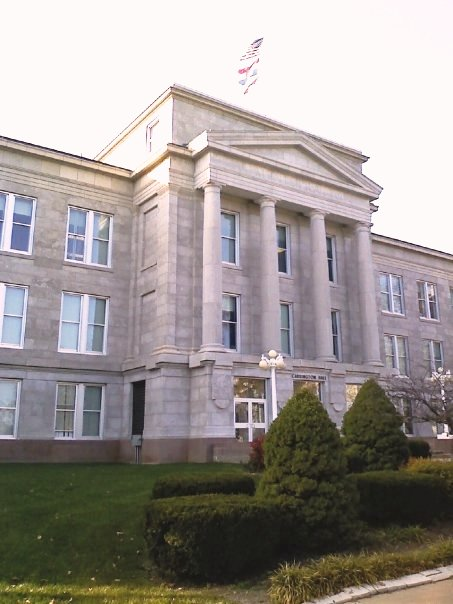
Carrington Hall

Classes began on June 11, 1906, with the first class totaling 543 students in an off-campus facility. The first permanent campus building was Academic Hall. Its cornerstone was laid on August 10, 1907, and construction was completed in January 1909. The building is now known as Carrington Hall, named after William T. Carrington, the first president of the State Normal School. It serves as the university's administrative center.

The Fourth District Normal School became Southwest Missouri State Teacher's College in 1919 to reflect its regional and academic emphasis. Throughout the interwar period, the college's programs expanded to include liberal arts and sciences in the curriculum, thus facilitating a name change to Southwest Missouri State College in 1945. A burgeoning student population throughout the 1950s and 1960s resulted in the establishment of residence halls, accompanied by a growth in postgraduate education. This led to a third name change in 1972, to Southwest Missouri State University. In 1973, enrollment surpassed 10,000 students for the first time.

By 1985, SMSU had grown into the second-largest public university in the state, leading administrators to support a bill to change the name to Missouri State University, which eventually died in committee in the Missouri General Assembly. In 1990, enrollment surpassed 20,000 students for the first time, but further attempts to rename the school throughout the 1990s and early 2000s also failed. However, the state legislature did grant the university a statewide mission in public affairs in 1995.

In 2004, with the election of Springfield native Matt Blunt to the governorship and the approaching centennial of the university's founding, new support developed for the name change. It was opposed by the University of Missouri System (which operates the four campuses of the University of Missouri), which feared that the name change would lead to duplication of academic programs and ongoing battles for students and state funding. In 2005, the name-change bill was passed, following a late-night compromise between University of Missouri System President Elson Floyd and then-Southwest Missouri State President John Keiser, stating that Missouri State University would not duplicate certain professional programs offered by the University of Missouri. The bill to rename the university finally passed the Missouri Senate (25–7). On March 1, 2005, after more than seven hours of debate, the bill passed the Missouri House (120–35). Governor Blunt signed it into law on March 17, 2005—the centennial anniversary of the university—at the Plaster Student Union, where several student and state leaders were present.

In 2006, the university modified its nondiscrimination policy to include sexual orientation as an officially protected status. The addition reads: "... the University does not discriminate on any basis (including, but not limited to, political affiliation and sexual orientation) not related to the applicable educational requirements for students or the applicable job requirements for employees." Former university president John Keiser had firmly opposed the change, as did the Student Government Association (SGA) in 2004 when Student Body President Chris Curtis moved to change the SGA constitution to mirror the university's. However, the policy was quietly changed on September 18, 2006, during a meeting held in St. Louis. This move was generally believed to avoid the mostly conservative citizens of Springfield and add this policy "under the radar" of the critics of the change. Missouri Governor Matt Blunt quickly released criticism of the policy change, calling it "unnecessary and bad", also saying the decision "bows to the forces of political correctness".

In 2011, the university's executive master of business administration (MBA) program for students from China came under scrutiny after an article in the Springfield News-Leader questioned the financial relationship between Missouri State and its Hong Kong-based agent, alleging that students were paying double the amount that MSU was receiving. The executive MBA program accepts cohorts of students who come through a sponsor - a provincial or municipal government agency, a university, or a corporation. Missouri State's agent, the International Management Education Corporation (IMEC), identifies and develops relationships with sponsors, who identify and prepare students, screening them for work experience, a minimum grade-point average at the undergraduate level (2.75), and English language proficiency. IMEC then provides MSU with a cohort of a minimum of 30 students, and the sponsors send MSU the students' applications for review. The fees students pay vary by sponsor and range from $15,000 to $22,000. IMEC was contracted to pay Missouri State between $10,103 and $11,886 per student; resulting in between 20 and 55% of the student fee being retained by IMEC. IMEC defended the fees, claiming they cover marketing/promotion/recruiting and the related overhead costs, as well as additional costs including intensive English training, examinations, advice on applications and documentations, visa application fees, and service and orientations provided by IMEC. University officials defended the program and arrangement, stating that it had allowed Missouri State to quickly grow the executive MBA program without having to spend university resources in recruiting and marketing overseas. The program has had 370 students since it started in 2007. However, the chair of the Faculty Senate said professors have periodically raised questions about the quality and oversight of the various China initiatives, and had prepared a list of questions for the president in light of the article, expressing a desire to ensure that proper oversight was in place to avoid compromising quality. Following translation and republication of information from the News-Leader article by Chinese newspapers, MSU reported that it received calls from several program sponsor organizations in China that they would no longer participate in the program. The university continued to defend the program, arguing that mistranslations of the article had provided an incorrect view of the program's academic rigor and stating that it intended to meet with sponsors and answer any questions about the program.

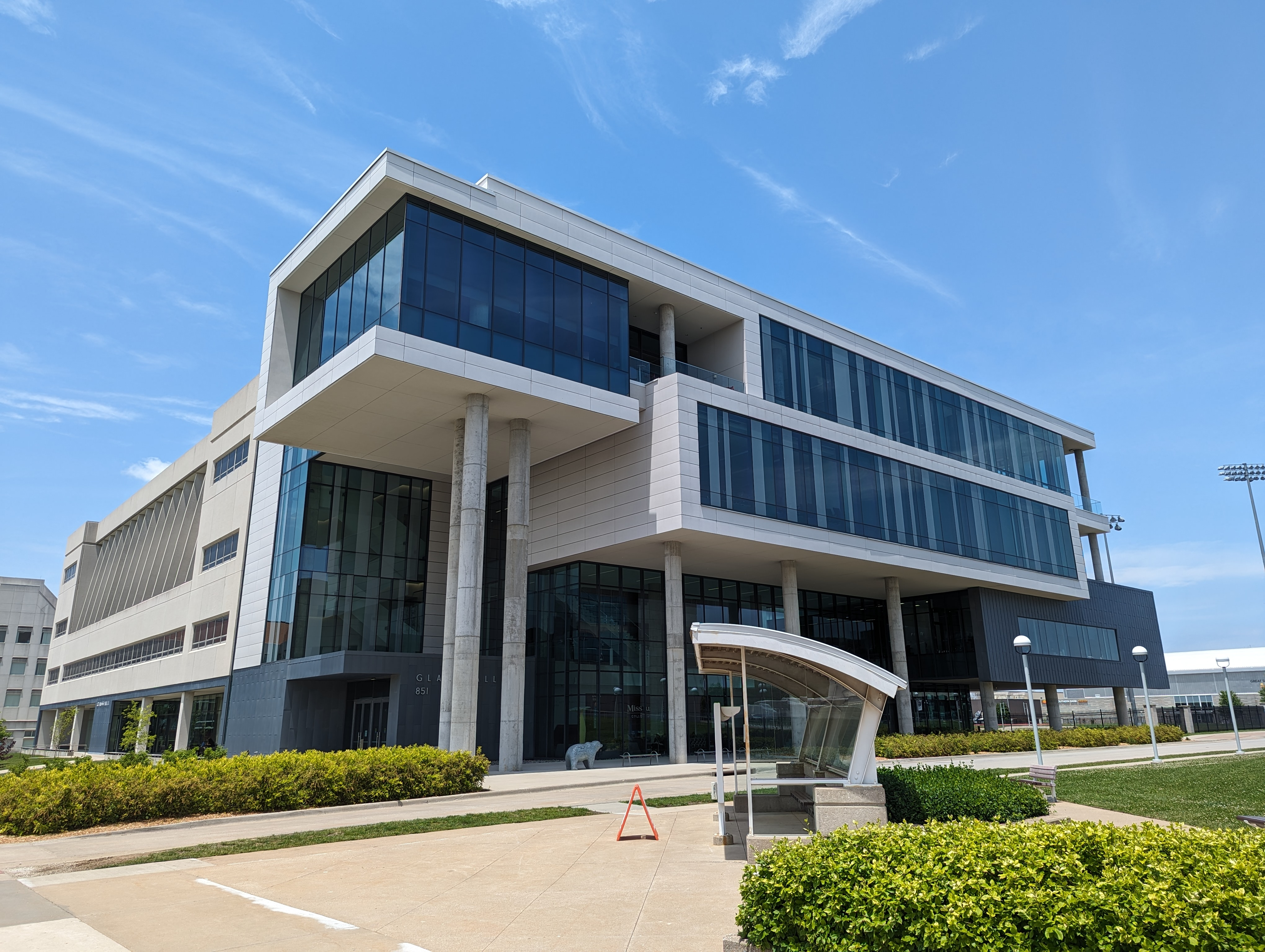
Glass Hall houses the College of Business.

The traditions of school colors and the school mascot were established during the 1906 school year, before the first permanent building (Carrington Hall) was even constructed. A joint committee of faculty and students decided on the colors of maroon and white to represent the university. The same committee also selected the Bear as the official school mascot, basing their choice on the design of the state seal of Missouri. The colors and mascots are reflected on the school seal.

In July 2025, Missouri Governor Mike Kehoe signed House Bill 419, Senate Bill 150, and Senate Bill 160, legislation granting Missouri State University the authority to independently award Doctor of Philosophy degrees. Previously, the University of Missouri system held exclusive rights to confer research doctorates and certain professional degrees in the state, including the bachelor of science in veterinary technology. Following the enactment, university officials announced plans to assess and develop new doctoral programs that align with regional and statewide workforce needs.

=== Presidents ===
Presidents of the college include:

1. William Thomas Carrington, 1906–1918
2. Clyde Milton Hill, 1918–1926
3. Roy Ellis, 1926–1961
4. Leland Eldridge Traywick, 1961–1964
5. Arthur Lee Mallory, 1964–1971
6. Duane G. Meyer, 1971–1983
7. Marshal Gordon, 1983–1992
  Russell Keeling (interim), 1992–1993
8. John Keiser, 1994–2005
9. Michael T. Nietzel, 2005–2010
10. James E. Cofer, 2010–2011
11. Clifton M. "Clif" Smart III, 2011–2024
12. Richard "Biff" Williams, 2024–present

== Academics ==
Missouri State University is classified among "Doctoral Universities".

=== Divisions ===
Missouri State University's academic divisions include:

- Reynolds College of Arts, Social Sciences, and Humanities
- College of Business
- College of Education
- McQueary College of Health and Human Services
- College of Natural and Applied Sciences
- Missouri State Outreach
- Missouri State Online
- William H. Darr College of Agriculture
- Graduate School

The university offers more than 150 undergraduate majors and over 45 graduate programs. For the 2022 fiscal year, the university awarded 4,404 degrees. The Springfield campus had 721 full-time instructional faculty in fall 2009, of which 46% were female and 60% were tenured. The student-faculty ratio is 20-to-1. Nearly 90% of full-time, ranked faculty members have the most advanced degree available in their fields. During its 2009 fiscal year, MSU received 196 grants totaling $20,901,035. Freshmen entering for the fall 2010 semester had an average ACT score of 24 and a high-school grade point average of 3.60.

=== LNU-MSU ===
In June 2000, Missouri State University entered into an agreement with Liaoning Normal University of the People's Republic of China to establish the LNU-MSU College of International Business on the campus of LNU. As an educational cooperation project between the two universities, the Branch Campus received formal approval from the governing bodies of both universities, the Missouri State Board of Governors and the Bureau of Education of Liaoning Province, China. The college currently offers an associate of arts in general studies degree and a bachelor of science, in general business degree. The Branch Campus programs are fully accredited by the Higher Learning Commission of the North Central Association of Colleges and Schools and the Associate to Advance Collegiate Business Schools (AACSB International). Dalian has a diverse student body, with students from all over the world, including South Korea, Indonesia, Senegal, Nigeria, Zambia, Iran, Japan, and the U.S. It is located atop a prominence on the North Campus of LNU overlooking the university to its south.

=== Public affairs mission ===
Missouri State University has a statewide mission in public affairs granted by the state legislature in 1995. The mission is stated as having three broad themes: Ethical Leadership, Cultural Competence, and Community Engagement. The goal of the Ethical Leadership component has been articulated by MSU as "students will articulate their value systems, act ethically within the context of a democratic society, and demonstrate engaged and principled leadership." The stated objective of the Cultural Competence component is "students will recognize and respect multiple perspectives and cultures." Two goals have been articulated for the Community Engagement portion of the mission. They are that "students will recognize the importance of contributing their knowledge and experiences to their own community and the broader society" and "students will recognize the importance of scientific principles in the generation of sound public policy." The public affairs mission is emphasized and enhanced by designated Public Affairs Professorships and a Provost Fellow for Public Affairs, special scholarship programs, grant program, Excellence in Community Service awards, a yearly week-long Missouri Public Affairs Academy for high-school students, a campus-wide public affairs emphasis week, and the annual MSU Public Affairs Conference, which brings together a diverse group of speakers and panelist for public discussions of various aspects of the public affairs mission. Past conference speakers have included Robert F. Kennedy, Jr., Nawal El Saadawi, Les Garland, John Edwards, and Frances Hesselbein.

== Campus ==
Missouri State University's main campus, containing over 40 buildings, is located on 225 acres (91.1 ha) in central Springfield. National Avenue forms the eastern boundary, with Kimbrough Avenue to the west, Elm Street to the north, and Grand Street to the south. John Q. Hammons Parkway bisects the campus, running north and south.

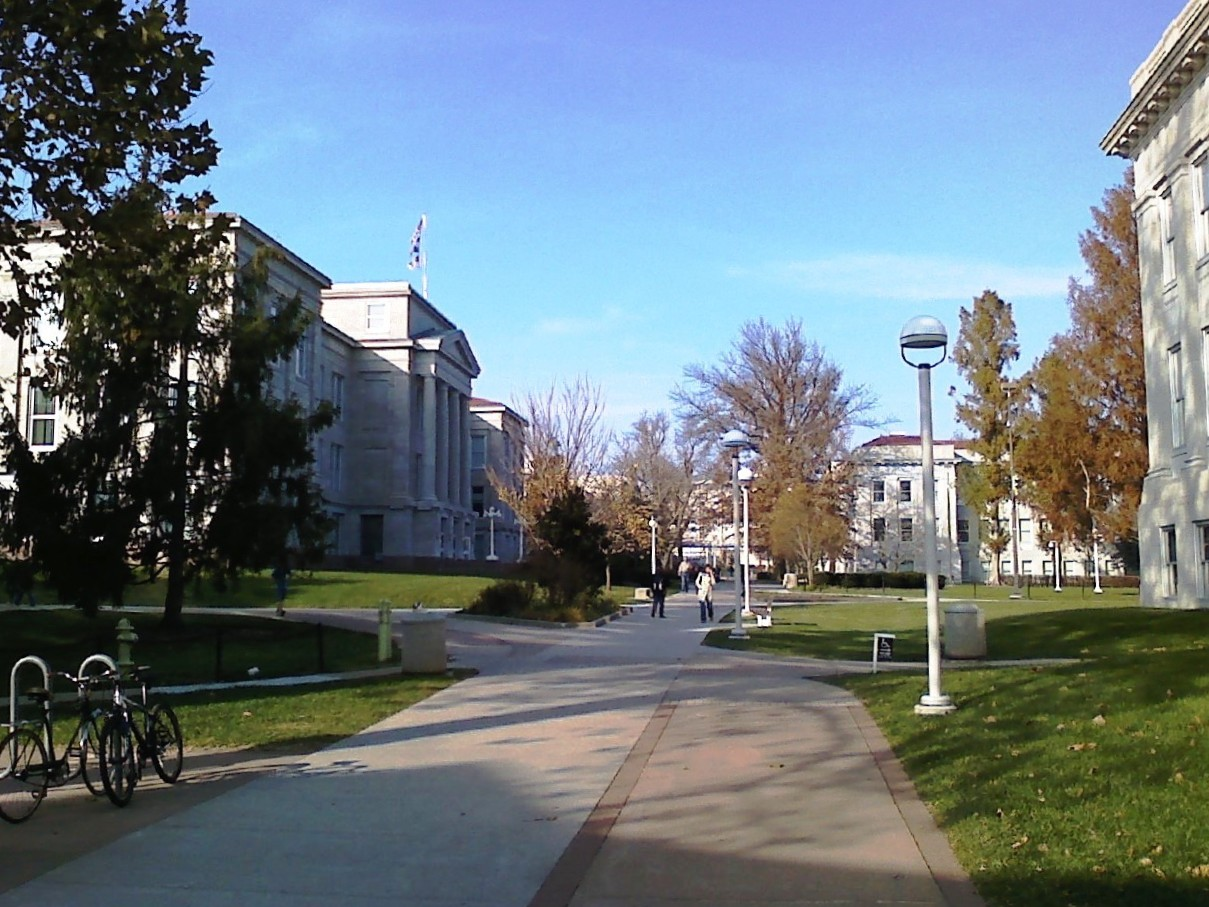
View toward Missouri State University's Historic Quadrangle

Facing National Avenue is the "Historic Quadrangle" containing Carrington Hall (1908), Hill Hall (1923), and Siceluff Hall (1927), as well as Cheek Hall (1955) and Ellis Hall (1959). South of that area is Pummill Hall (1957), Karls Hall (1958), and Craig Hall (1967), which contains the Coger Theater and is the site of an annual outdoor summer tent theatre program. It includes the Art Annex (1958) acquired from nearby Camp Crowder.

In the center of campus is the Duane G. Meyer Library, constructed in 1980 and named after a former president of the university. It contains over 877,000 books, subscriptions to over 3,500 periodicals and newspapers, with back issues on microfilm, microfiche, and microcard, and full-text electronic access to over 20,000 periodicals. In addition, the library contains over 934,000 state, federal and United Nations government documents. The Meyer Library was renovated and expanded in 2002 and included the addition of the Jane A. Meyer Carillon, one of only 164 such instruments in the United States. In front of Meyer Library is the five-level, multijet John Q. Hammons Fountain (named for the MSU alumnus and hotel developer).

Missouri State's COB is housed in David D. Glass Hall, a four-story, 185,000-square-foot (17,200 m^{2}) building. Glass Hall is named in honor of MSU alumnus and former Wal-Mart CEO David Glass. Originally built in 1988, the College of Business underwent a major renovation in 2016 to update the building and provide more space for academic activities. All programs in the College of Business are accredited by the Association to Advance Collegiate Schools of Business.

Other major academic buildings are located south and west of the Meyer Library. These include Blunt Hall (formerly Temple Hall) (1971), Kemper Hall (1976), and Strong Hall (1998). The majority of the north side of the campus is dedicated to student residences and recreational areas; however, Greenwood Laboratory School, a fully functioning kindergarten-grade 12 school, is also located in this area.

=== Jane A. Meyer Carillon ===
Duane G. Meyer Library and Jane A. Meyer Carillon with the John Q. Hammons Fountain

The Jane A. Meyer Carillon is located in the center of the Missouri State University campus, at the southwest corner of the Duane G. Meyer Library. It was dedicated on April 13, 2002. The total weight of the 48 bronze bells and cast-iron clappers is 32,000 pounds, with the largest bell weighing 5,894 pounds. The complete carillon and its supporting tower structure weigh 2.5 million pounds. Funds for the purchase of the bells and keyboard and for the construction of the tower were provided by Ken and Jane Meyer, longtime friends of the university and supporters of the arts. Jane Meyer was a former organ student of the MSU Department of Music. The carillon's 48 bronze bells, cast-iron clappers, and keyboard were purchased from and installed by Royal Eijsbouts, a prestigious bell-making firm from the Netherlands. The carillon plays the standard Westminster chime sequence every 15 minutes, with the first of the hourly bells marking the exact start of each hour. The department of music also coordinates and presents special concerts throughout the year.

=== Juanita K. Hammons Hall for the Performing Arts ===
Juanita K. Hammons Hall for the Performing Arts is a 2,220-seat center located in the northwest corner of the campus. Juanita K. (as referred to by locals) not only hosts the university's music, dance, and theatre department performances, but it also is home to the Springfield Symphony Orchestra. It is the Springfield area's major performance hall and presents a regular schedule of national touring companies and prominent individual performers. The hall includes multilevel boxes and moveable orchestra pit; spacious backstage facilities with individual, crew, and chorus dressing rooms, cast lounge, green room, loading dock, and break areas; an expansive multilevel lobby; public and private reception areas; full-service, front-of-house, technical and support staff offices; an on-site computerized box office; and a five-level parking garage adjacent to the building.

=== Athletic facilities ===
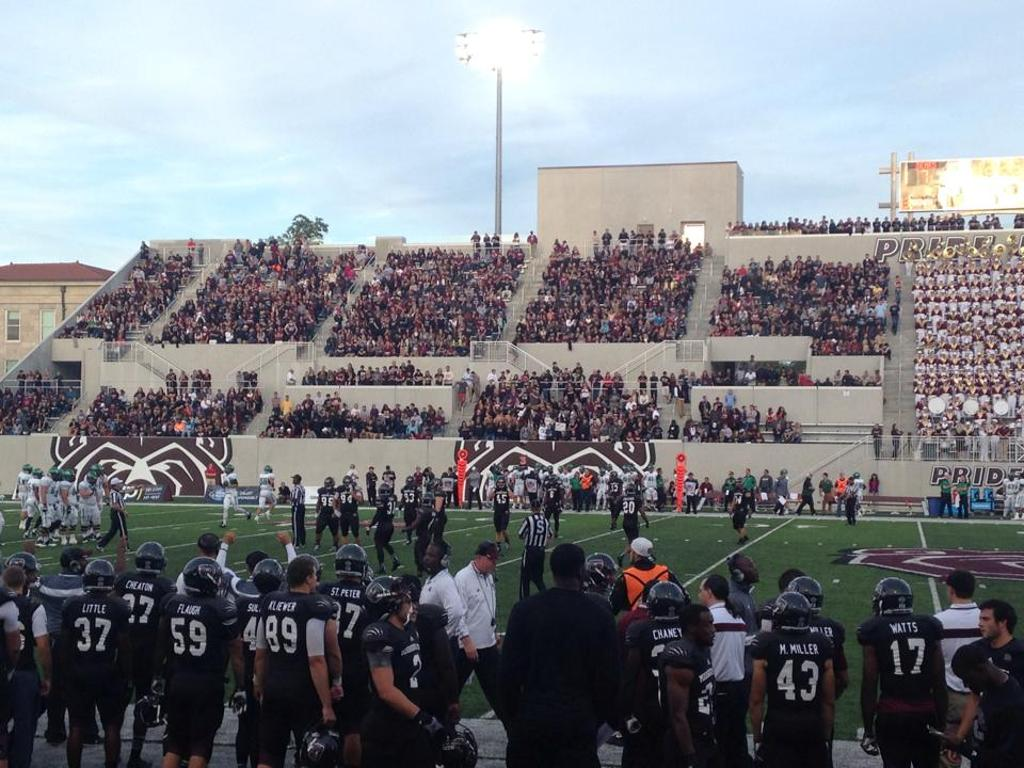
Plaster Stadium

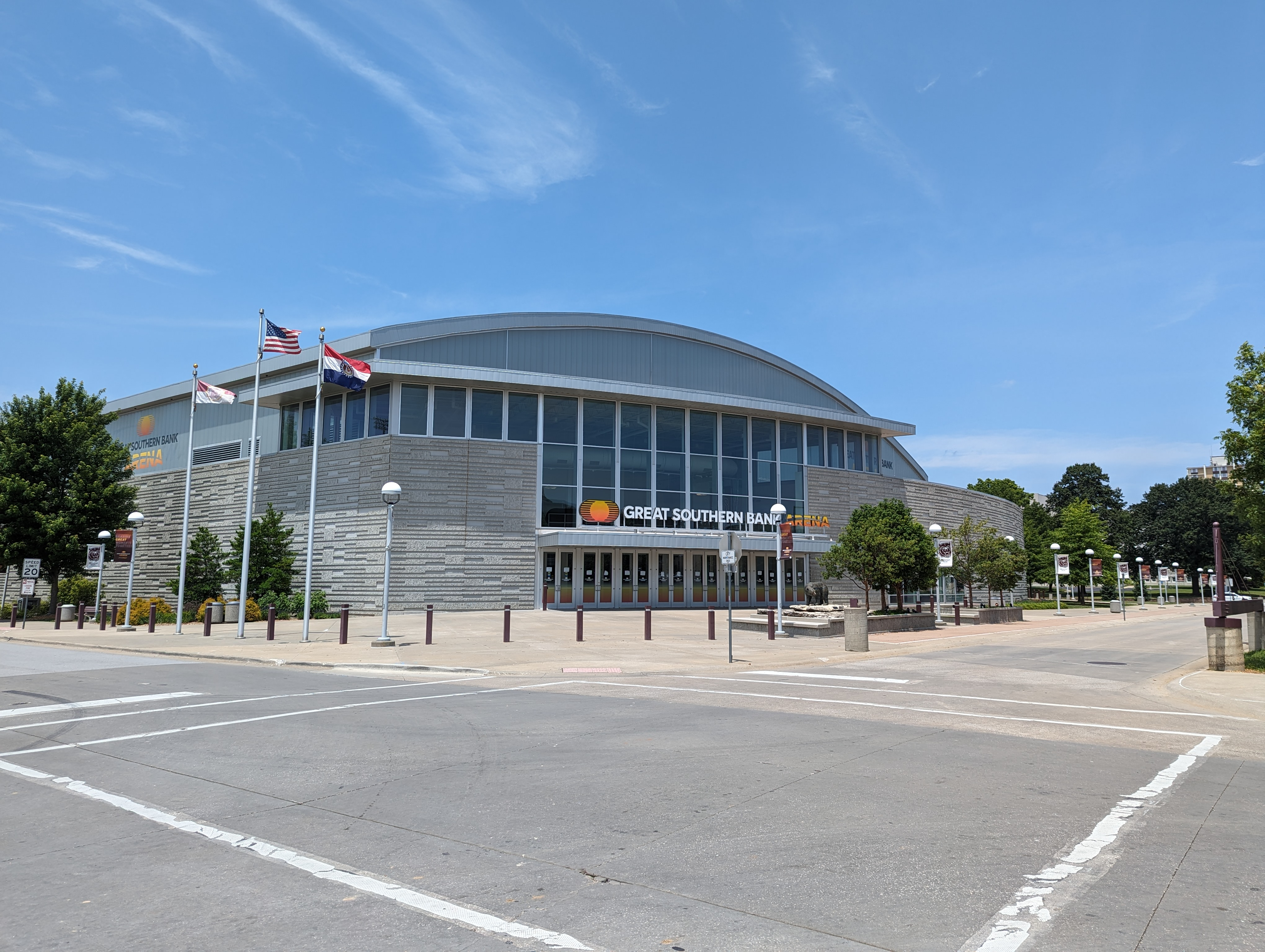
Great Southern Bank Arena

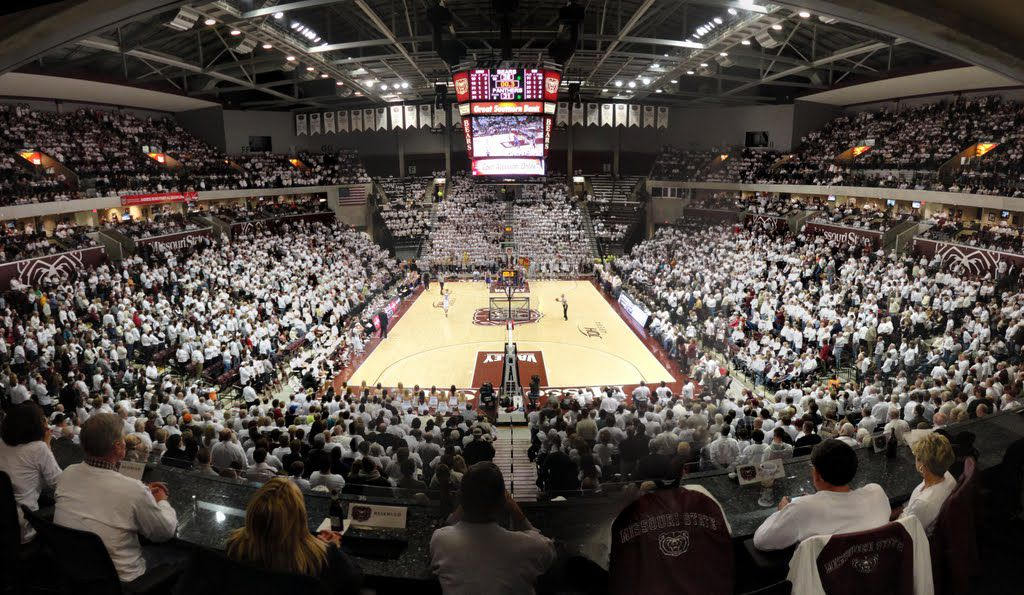
Interior of the arena

Southeast of Meyer Library is the Robert W. Plaster Sports Complex. Originally built in 1930, the athletic field became the stadium in 1941 and was known for many years as Briggs Stadium in honor of Coach A. W. Briggs, longtime head of Missouri State's athletic department. In 2014, the stadium was converted to a football-specific field surface, and other renovations were made for a more intimate fan experience. The playing surface was replaced and moved closer to the west grandstand. In addition, the student side (east side) was fully replaced from the ground up and includes game-day locker rooms, a new scoreboard, and a party platform called "The Clif". The facility was renamed after a major expansion and renovation in the 1980s that included installation of an artificial playing surface, an all-weather track, a second level of seating, 12 racquetball courts, men's and women's locker rooms, five classrooms, and a fitness center. Immediately north of Plaster Sports Complex is McDonald Arena, built by Works Progress Administration labor in 1940. It served as the university's central indoor arena until construction of the John Q. Hammons Student Center on the campus' north-west edge in 1976. That venue was, in turn, replaced as the primary indoor sporting venue by construction of the adjacent 11,000-seat Great Southern Bank Arena (formerly JQH Arena) in 2008.

=== Campus housing ===
The Missouri State University main campus contains nine residence halls and two apartment buildings.

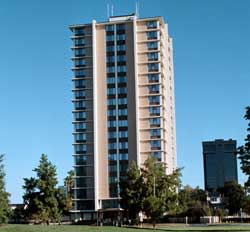
Sunvilla Tower

Kentwood Hall was originally built as the luxury Kentwood Arms Hotel (1926), whose guests included President Harry S. Truman and comedian Groucho Marx. According to the Missouri State University newspaper The Standard, it had been used as a campaign stop for Richard Nixon during his 1960 Presidential run. It was purchased by Missouri State University from John Q. Hammonds in 1984, then renovated three times since its opening (1986, 1987, and 2014). It can accommodate up to 101 students. Used as a quarantine facility in 2020 and 2021 during the COVID-19 pandemic, it has been reopened as of August 2024 for use as a dormitory, though with reduced amenities from its previous use.

Computer labs, laundry rooms, kitchen facilities, and public meeting/study spaces are located in every one of the university's residence halls. Available services include free laundry, Philo streaming internet protocol TV service, WiFi, and 24-hour front-desk assistance. Within select houses are floors designated as "Living-Learning Communities" (or LLCs). These have a particular theme that is either academically based or interest based. All residential areas are smoke and tobacco free.

Citing the proven detrimental health effects of tobacco use, effective August 15, 2010, Missouri State University enacted a policy further restricting the use of tobacco products and smokeless tobacco on the campus.

=== Robert W. Plaster Student Union ===
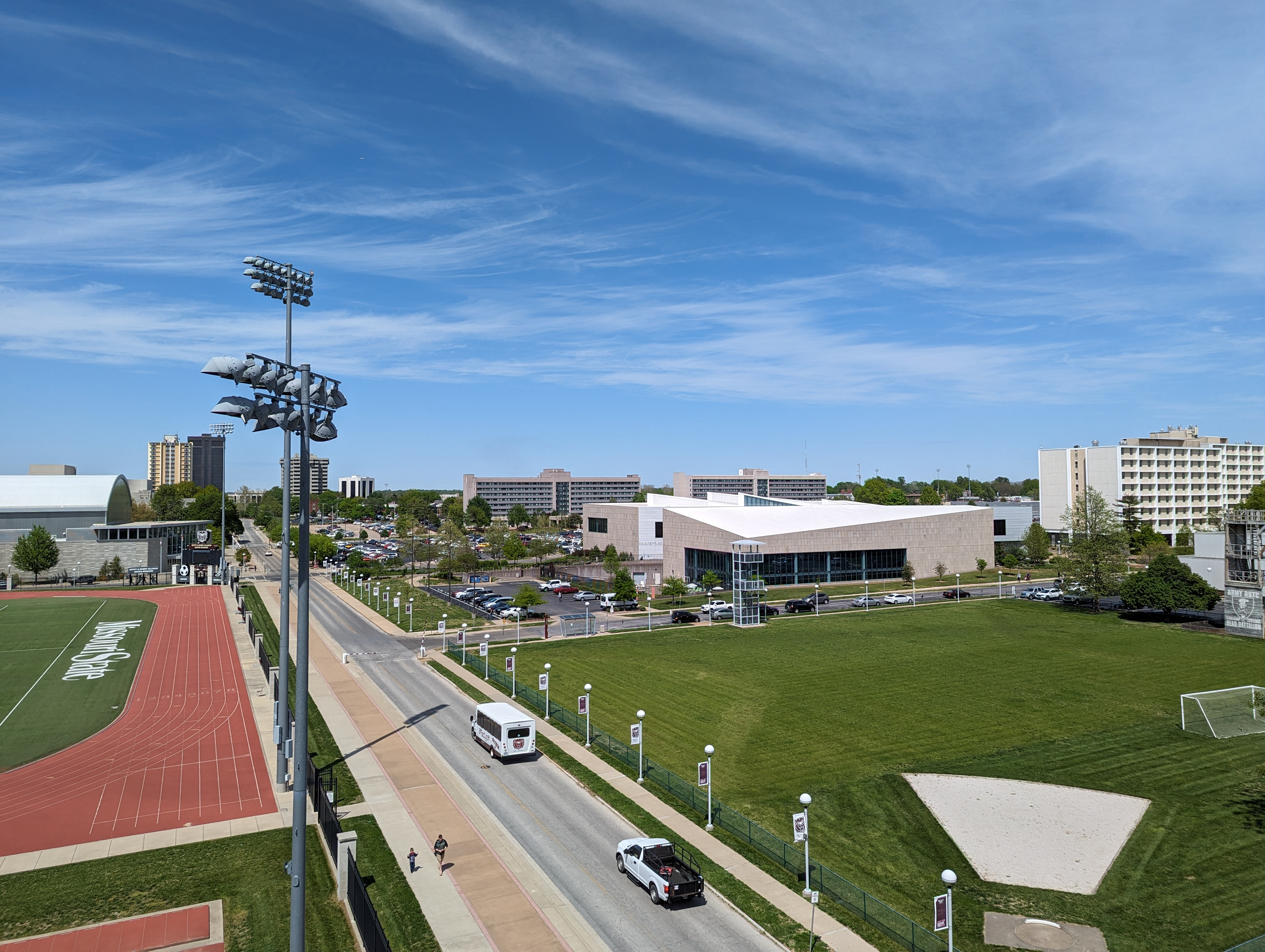
Aerial view of a portion of the campus

The four-story Robert W. Plaster Student Union (PSU) is a student activity center located in the center of campus between the main academic and residential areas. This building provides a place for students to dine, socialize, study, shop, and see films and guest speakers in the theater. Multiple restaurant locations are located within the PSU, including Chick-Fil-A, a local business named Queen City Soul Food, Freddy's Frozen Custard & Steakburgers, Subway, Panda Express, Starbucks, and a university-based venue: the Union Club. It also houses a convenience store, a copy shop, a clothing store, and an e-sports center, which replaced the former bowling alley. Several meeting rooms are also located in the PSU and over 15,000 meetings are hosted there each year. Offices located in the PSU include Student Engagement, Student Conduct, Multicultural Resources, BearPass Card (MSU's ID system), Campus Recreation, Outdoor Adventures, Citizenship and Service-Learning, Conference Services, various student organizations, the dean of students, Judicial Affairs, Disability Support Services, and Student Orientation, Advisement, and Registration (SOAR). The PSU also includes the Leland E. Traywick Parliamentary Room. Dedicated on February 18, 2004, it is named to honor a former MSU president and his introduction of shared governance, including the establishment of the Faculty Senate, during his presidency. A bronze bear statue dedicated to the university in 1999 stands at the student union's front entrance. Also located in front of the PSU is the North Mall, which is the location of the "Bear Paw", an outdoor plaza and performance area constructed for concerts, forums, rallies, demonstrations, and other public activities. Any member of the university community (such as students, faculty, or staff) may reserve the Bear Paw, and when not reserved, it is available for expressive activities on a first-come, first-served basis.

=== Recreation ===
An active intramural sports program includes competition in basketball, billiards, bowling, disc golf, dodgeball, flag football, futsal, golf, racquetball, sand volleyball, soccer, softball, table tennis, tennis, track, ultimate, volleyball, and weight lifting. Two large intramural fields with artificial turf, electronic scoreboards, and stadium lighting are located on East Harrison Street near Scholars House. A Fitness and Wellness Program offers a variety of group classes and activities to students, including classes with licensed instructors in Pilates, Yoga, Belly Dance, and Zumba. The campus Outdoor Adventures program also provides opportunity and equipment rentals for activities, such as rock climbing, caving, camping, canoeing, and kayaking in the surrounding Ozarks.

In 2012, the 100,000 sq ft (9,300 m^{2}) Bill R. Foster and Family Recreation Center was opened to the public.

=== Arlington, VA Campus ===
MSU operates a satellite campus in Arlington, Virginia. This location is home to the School of Defense and Strategic Studies. The program is located in Virginia to work in close cooperation with the federal government and various defense related think tanks located in or near the Beltway. Students may also apply for national security related internships within the region. DSS offers two graduate certificates, a master's of science with an optional focus in weapons of mass destruction, and a professional doctorate. Courses are offered both in person and online.

== Student life ==
Undergraduate demographics as of fall 2023
Race and ethnicity	Total
White	79%
Hispanic	5%
Black	4%
Two or more races	4%
International student	3%
Unknown	3%
Asian	2%
Economic diversity
Low-income (Note: The percentage of students who received an income-based federal Pell grant intended for low-income students)	30%
Affluent (Note: The percentage of students who are a part of the American middle class at the bare minimum)	70%

There are over 300 student organizations at Missouri State. Student organizations are grouped into eight categories according to their main purpose. These include academic/professional, Greek, honorary, religious, service, social, sports, and university.

=== Music ===
The Pride Marching Band is the official marching band of Missouri State University. The band consists of 300 student musicians, plays at every home football game and has been featured in the Macy's Thanksgiving Day Parade in New York City (1988, 1996, 2001), the Tournament of Roses Parade in Pasadena (1995 and 2008), and the Orange Bowl Parade in Miami (1988). They have appeared in the Louisiana Superdome for the New Orleans Saints, in the Trans World Dome for the St. Louis Rams, at Arrowhead Stadium for the Kansas City Chiefs, and at Mile High Stadium for the Denver Broncos. In December 2005 the Pride Band traveled to London, England to be the honor band in the London New Year's Day parade, and was the Honor Band in the 2009 McDonald's Thanksgiving Parade in Chicago, Illinois.

The university's chorale performed at the presidential inauguration of Donald Trump in 2017.

=== Chi Alpha ===
The first Chi Alpha Christian Fellowship (ΧΑ) was chartered on Missouri State University's campus in 1953. The national organization for Chi Alpha is headquartered in Springfield, MO.

=== News ===
The Standard is the university's student-run newspaper. It releases consistent online coverage of campus news and Springfield-area coverage, and also releases multiple print editions each semester, including an issue pertaining to student housing released once per semester. Included in its online content is multiple podcasts and various broadcast projects. The newspaper's content is entirely created and edited by the student staff.

Ozarks News Journal is a half-hour public affairs TV news magazine produced in fall and spring semesters by broadcast journalism students in the Media, Journalism & Film Department. The show airs weekly on Media Com cable 22 in Springfield.

=== Radio and television ===
KSMU 91.1 FM is the university's licensed public radio station, broadcasting National Public Radio content, local news and classical music. Its state-of-the-art studios are located in Strong Hall. The station has received numerous awards, including the 2002 National Edward R. Murrow Award from the RTNDA for News Series, the 2001 Regional Edward R. Murrow Award from the RTNDA for Feature Reporting, the 1987 National Edward R. Murrow Award from the RTNDA for Investigative Reporting, The Missouri Broadcasters Association Excellence Award in Documentary Public Affairs in 2002 and 2000, Certificates of Merit for Feature Reporting, Public Affairs Reporting, and Complete News from the Missouri Broadcasters Association, three Public Radio News Directors Incorporated Awards, and the Missouri State Teachers Association Award for Excellence in Education Reporting.

MSU is also the licensee operating Ozarks Public Television, providing PBS programming and instructional television services to 549,540 households in Southwest Missouri and the adjoining three state area. KOZK, the PBS member station in Springfield airs on digital channel 23, virtual channel 21, and a sister station, KOZJ, airs in Joplin, Missouri as digital channel 25, virtual channel 26. The stations digital signal multicasts as 21.1/26.1: OPT-High Definition; 21.2/26.2: OPT-ED (Airs telecourses from MSU as well as miscellaneous PBS programming); and 21.3/26.3: Create, a how-to/DIY network. The broadcast and studio facilities are located in Strong Hall.

== Athletics ==
=== Varsity sports ===
Missouri State University sponsors 17 NCAA Division I intercollegiate athletic teams in men's and women's basketball, golf, soccer, swimming and diving; men's baseball and football; and women's beach volleyball, cross country, softball, tennis, track, and volleyball. MSU teams are nicknamed the Bears, and team colors are maroon and white. The Missouri State University Bears are members of Conference USA. Football competes in the NCAA Division I Football Bowl Subdivision. Missouri State teams have made 52 NCAA championship appearances since moving to Division I in the 1982–83 season. The men's basketball team reached the Sweet Sixteen in 1999 and women's basketball made the Final Four in 1992 and 2001, and the Sweet Sixteen in 1993, 2019, and 2021. Baseball made the College World Series in 2003 and volleyball earned their 1000th win Nov. 17, 2006 (only the second team in NCAA history to do so). In 1974, the women's softball team won the AIAW national championship.

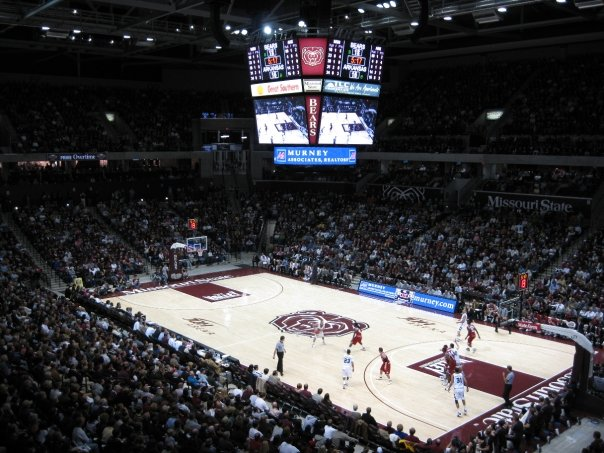
Bears basketball at JQH Arena

=== Club teams ===
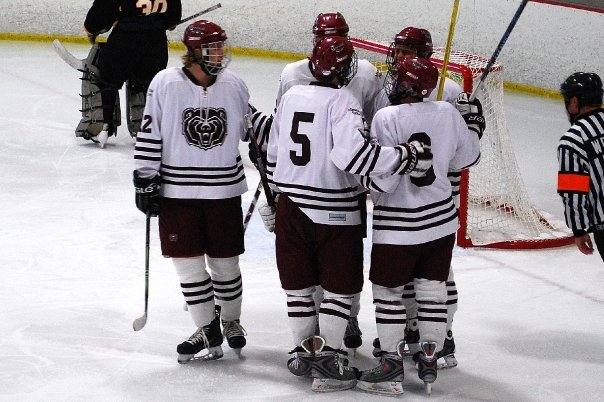
MSU Ice Bears hockey team

Missouri State University sponsors several club teams. The MSU Handball team has won several championships.

In 2001, Missouri State started a club ice hockey team, Missouri State University Ice Bears Hockey, that competes in the American Collegiate Hockey Association (ACHA) Division I and Division ӀӀӀ Western Collegiate Hockey League. In 2009 the Ice Bears made their fourth straight ACHA Central Region post season tournament appearance in ACHA Division 2. In 2014, the Missouri State University Ice Bears won the Central Division Regionals and made their first ACHA National Championship Appearance in their 13-year existence. In 2015 the Ice Bears made their second consecutive National Championship Tournament appearance in Salt Lake City Utah. After a 30–2 vote the Ice Bears joined the WCHL in ACHA Division 1 for the 2015–16 season. Ice Bears home games are played at Mediacom Ice Park.

Additional club sports at Missouri State include a men’s lacrosse team, bowling team, pistol team, rodeo team, roller hockey club, water ski team, wrestling club, and men's and women's club soccer teams.
