= KCND =

Radio station in Bismarck, North Dakota

Coordinates: 46.590°N 100.801°W

Bismarck, North Dakota; United States
- Broadcast area: Bismarck-Mandan
- Frequency: 90.5 MHz (HD Radio)
- Branding: Prairie Public

Programming
- Format: Public radio; jazz, classical, news
- Subchannels: HD2: Relay of KFJM Grand Forks
- Network: Prairie Public Radio
- Affiliations: NPR

Ownership
- Owner: Prairie Public Broadcasting

History
- First air date: September 1, 1981
- Call sign meaning: "Capital of North Dakota"

Technical information
- Licensing authority: FCC
- Facility ID: 53317
- Class: C1
- ERP: 50,000 watts
- HAAT: 371 meters (1,217 ft)

Links
- Public license information: Public file; LMS
- Webcast: Listen live
- Website: www.prairiepublic.org

KCND (90.5 FM) is a public radio station licensed to Bismarck. It signed on the air in 1981 as Prairie Public Radio, which later became part of the statewide North Dakota Public Radio network, the entirety of which was later renamed Prairie Public Radio. It currently broadcasts with an effective radiated power of 50 kW on 90.5 MHz.

News Director Dave Thompson worked at KCND for over 40 years, becoming one of the most recognizable voices in North Dakota journalism. He was the first person to speak on Prairie Public’s radio network when KCND-FM launched on September 1, 1981, and remained a key figure in the station’s news coverage for decades.
