= KWTL =

Real Presence Radio flagship station in Grand Forks, North Dakota

- Grand Forks, North Dakota; United States
- Frequency: 1370 kHz
- Branding: Real Presence Radio

Programming
- Format: Catholic
- Affiliations: Real Presence Radio, EWTN Radio

Ownership
- Owner: Real Presence Radio

History
- First air date: October 9, 1923
- Former call signs: KFJM (1923–1997); KUND (1997–2004)
- Former frequencies: 1080 kHz (1927); 900 kHz (1927–1928); 550 kHz (1928); 1370 kHz (1928–1936); 1410 kHz (1936–1941); 1440 kHz (1941–1957)
- Call sign meaning: Knowing the Way, the Truth, and the Life

Technical information
- Licensing authority: FCC
- Class: B
- Power: 12,000 watts (day); 270 watts (night)
- ERP: =
- Transmitter coordinates: 47°52′59″N 97°06′46″W
- Translator: 92.5 K223DF (Grand Forks)

Links
- Public license information: Public file; LMS
- Webcast: Listen Live!
- Website: RPR website

KWTL (1370 AM) is a radio station licensed to Grand Forks, North Dakota which airs Catholic talk radio programming. It is the flagship station for Real Presence Radio, and also airs Eternal Word Television Network (EWTN) National radio programming and features local shows like "Real Presence Live" plus interviews and guests from across the Red River Valley and the Area Dioceses. KWTL also broadcasts on translator K223DF (92.5 FM) in Grand Forks.

KWTL's signal covers parts of three states and two Canadian provinces. It is the second oldest radio station in North Dakota, after WDAY in Fargo.

== History ==
KWTL's first license, with the sequentially assigned call letters KFJM, was granted on August 13, 1923 to the University of North Dakota, making it one of the first college radio stations. The station signed on the air in October 9, 1923. Its initial assignment was to 1310 kHz, however its frequency was changed multiple times throughout the years, including 900, 550, 1370, 1410, and 1440 kHz. It changed back to 1370 kHz in 1957.

In 1930, a station filing stated that KFJM had been established "to provide laboratory facilities for the students studying radio engineering and to further the educational programs of the university". At this time it was broadcasting about eight hours per day.

In 1976 the University of North Dakota established an FM station, KFJM-FM. In 1995, KFJY signed on as the university's second FM station, simulcasting KFJM (AM) with an AAA format and jazz overnight. During April 1997, both stations went off the air as the floodwaters went through the transmitter site.

On August 15, 1997 all three University of North Dakota stations changed call signs. KFJM became KUND and KFJM-FM on 89.3 MHz became KUND-FM, while KFJY on 90.7 MHz inherited the historic KFJM call letters. KUND later became known as Northern Lights Public Radio, as some of its funding came from the listening audience.

On July 31, 2002, KUND (AM) and KFJM (FM) went off the air due to shortages from public funding, although KUND-FM (89.3) continued to be operated by Prairie Public Radio. The stations signed back on in August 2002 with an adult album alternative format along with programming from North Dakota Public Radio and National Public Radio.

In 2004 KUND (AM) was sold to Real Presence Radio, a Roman Catholic organization. The call sign changed to KWTL on November 4, and it began airing programming from EWTN's radio service. On December 25, 2007, KWTL began operating with 12,000 watts during daylight hours.
