= The Forum of Fargo–Moorhead =

Daily newspaper in Fargo, North Dakota

Coordinates: 46.877759°N 96.785766°W

- The Forum front page for April 16, 2008
- Type: Daily newspaper
- Format: Broadsheet
- Owner: Forum Communications Company
- Founder(s): Alanson W. Edwards and H. C. Plumley
- Publisher: Bill Marcil, Jr.
- Editor: Matthew Von Pinnon
- Founded: November 17, 1891 (with heritage dating to 1878)
- Language: English
- Headquarters: 101 5th Street North; Fargo, ND 58102-4826; US
- Circulation: 10,000 digital subscribers 34,029 (as of 2024)
- ISSN: 0895-1292
- OCLC number: 9563116
- Website: inforum.com

The Forum of Fargo–Moorhead or more recently The Forum is an American, English language newspaper. It is the major newspaper for Fargo, North Dakota and the surrounding region, including Moorhead, Minnesota. It is the flagship and namesake of Forum Communications. It is the primary paper for southeast North Dakota, and also much of northwest Minnesota.

== History ==
In September 1878, J.B. Hall founded The Fargo Republican. In February 1884, Hall retired and A.C. Jordan replaced him. In May 1877, A.C. Jordan sold out to his brother, J.J. Jordan.

On November 17, 1891, Major Alanson W. "A. W." Edwards and H.C. Plumley published the first edition of The Fargo Forum. In February 1892, J.J. Jordan was appointed postmaster. In October 1894, Jordan sold the Republican to Edwards and Plumley who consolidated it into the Forum.

In February 1908, Edwards died. Outside the Forum, his other accomplishments included founding the Fargo Argus, serving as Fargo mayor, as a member of the state assembly and as U.S. consul general in Montreal. In August 1912, the Forum entered receivership, and in November 1912 was sold at public auction to J.P. Dotson, editor of the Crookston Times, for $52,500. At that time Plumley left the business.

In May 1913, The Forum Publishing Co. was incorporated with Dotson as president. In April 1917, Dotson sold the business to Norman B. Black, former general manager of the Grand Forks Herald, for over $100,000. Black took on his son, Norman D. Black, and H. D. Paulson as minority partners. In 1924, the Blacks and Paulson bought the Daily Tribune, successor to the Argus, bringing all of the papers founded by Edwards under one umbrella. This allowed the Forum to expand to a seven-day paper with morning and evening editions during the week.

N.B. Black died in January 1931 at age 65, and was succeeded as publisher by his son, Norman D. Black. In January 1933, N.B. Black became one of the first two inductees in the North Dakota Newspaper Hall of Fame.

In August 1951, Jenny C. Black, company president and widow of N.B. Black, died at age 81. In August 1944, N.D. Black died of a sudden heart attack at age 57, and then was succeeded as publisher by his son, Noman D. Black, Jr. In November 1954, the Black family acquired the Moorhead Daily News. In June 1957, the Daily News was merged into the Forum. In 1966, the paper was modified to its current name, The Forum of Fargo-Moorhead.

In September 1969, N.D. Black, Jr. died at age 56, and was succeeded as publisher by his nephew, William C. Marcil. In May 1986, N.D. Black, Jr. was inducted into the state's newspaper hall of fame. In May 2005, Marcil was also inducted. In September 2010, Marcil retired and was succeeded by his son, Bill Marcil, Jr. In May 2020, the Forum reduced its print schedule to Wednesdays and Saturdays and switched from carrier to postal delivery due to the COVID-19 pandemic.

== TV/Radio ==
The Forum is also co-owned with TV stations WDAY-TV and WDAZ-TV. It used to own KOYY under the call sign WDAY-FM, as well as WDAY-AM. In spring 2008, The Forum's news staff merged with WDAY-AM's news team, forming one of the first joint radio-print news-gathering operations in the country. This ended in 2025 when The Forum sold WDAY-AM. The Forum has been in broadcasting since 1935, when it led a syndicate that bought in WDAY-AM in 1935. WDAY-TV signed on in 1953. The Forum bought full control of the WDAY stations in 1958.

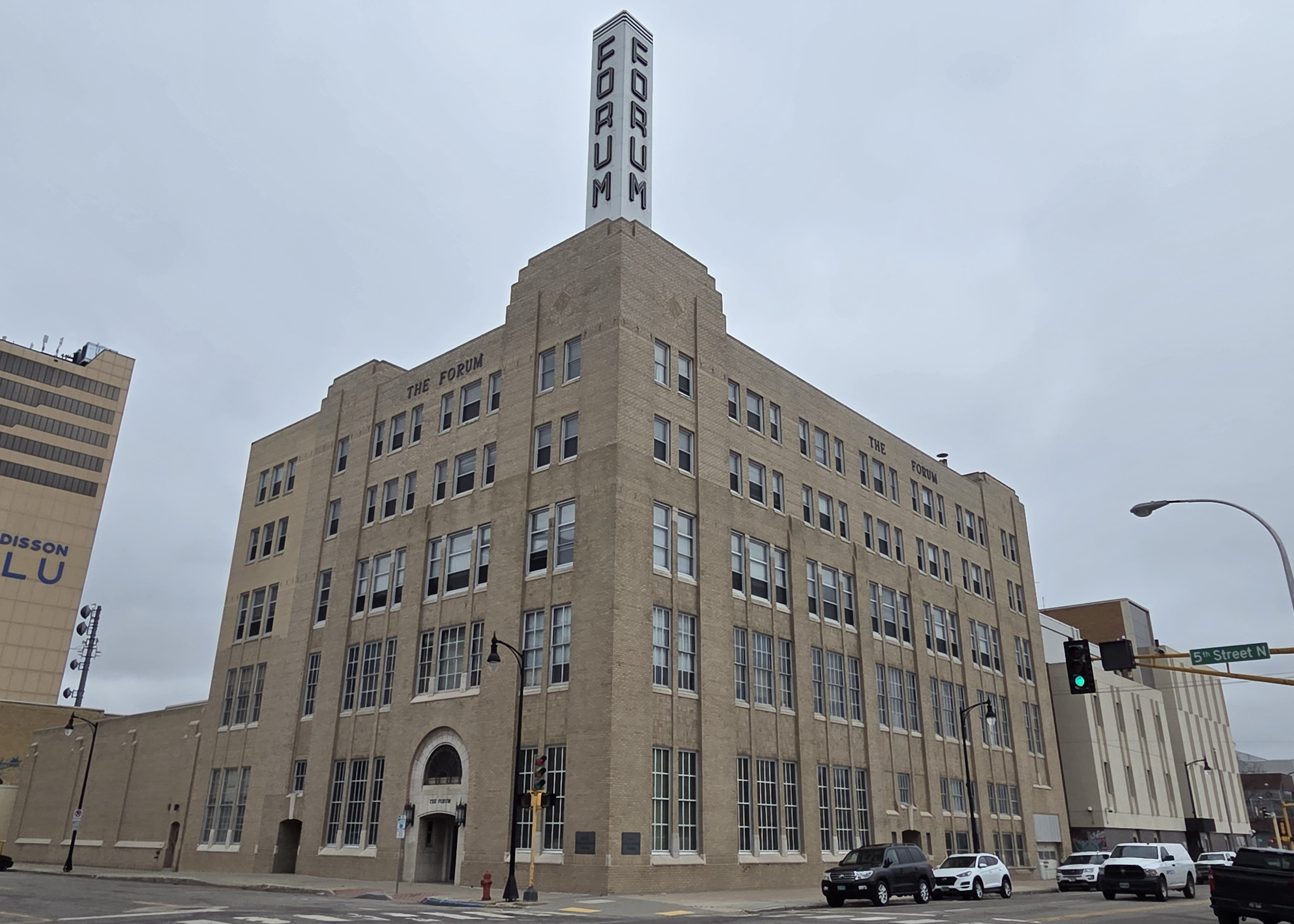
Headquarters in Fargo

== See also ==
- List of newspapers in Minnesota
- WDAY-TV
- WDAY AM
