= Prairie Public Radio =

Public radio network serving North Dakota, United States

Prairie Public
- Type: Public radio network
- Country: United States
- Headquarters: Fargo, North Dakota

Programming
- Affiliations: National Public Radio, American Public Media, Public Radio International, Public Radio Exchange

Ownership
- Owner: Prairie Public Broadcasting, North Dakota State University (KDSU)
- Sister stations: Prairie Public Television (PBS)
- Key people: Bill Thomas, Director of Radio

History
- Launch date: February 1, 1999
- Former names: Prairie Public Radio, North Dakota Public Radio

Coverage
- Availability: North Dakota, northwestern Minnesota, eastern Montana

Links
- Webcast: Listen
- Website: PrairiePublic.org/radio

Prairie Public's radio service is a network of ten radio frequencies in North Dakota. It is a service of Prairie Public Broadcasting based in Fargo.

Prairie Public maintains active studios on 5th Street North in Fargo and on North 15th Street in Bismarck. It is a member station of National Public Radio (NPR) and provides NPR news and programming, local and regional news, and two distinct music formats: the News and Classical network, and the adult album alternative formatted Roots, Rock, and Jazz network.

== Programming ==
Prairie Public produces and broadcasts Main Street, a weekday interview show hosted by Ashley Thornberg and Craig Blumenshine, Dakota Datebook, Into the Music with Mike Olson, Prebys on Classics, and Why?, hosted by UND philosophy professor Dr. Jack Weinstein. Prairie Public is also the distributor for Listening to America with Clay Jenkinson.

Prairie Public offers news programming on weekday mornings and afternoons from its newsrooms in Bismarck and Fargo. It also airs news from NPR.

Prairie Public is a member station of National Public Radio, airing programs such as All Things Considered, and also carries programming from Public Radio International (such as The World) and American Public Media, as well as from Public Radio Exchange (such as This American Life).

Prairie Public's radio network offers two programming services. The primary News and Classical network originating from KCND in Bismarck is carried on most stations, and split into eastern and western schedules. The adult album alternative formatted Roots, Rock, and Jazz network originating from KFJM in Grand Forks has gradually expanded its programming to additional stations since its launch in 2002. KDSU in Fargo carries a combination of both networks, airing Roots, Rock and Jazz programming when the rest of the main network airs classical music.

=== News and Classical network (FM1) ===
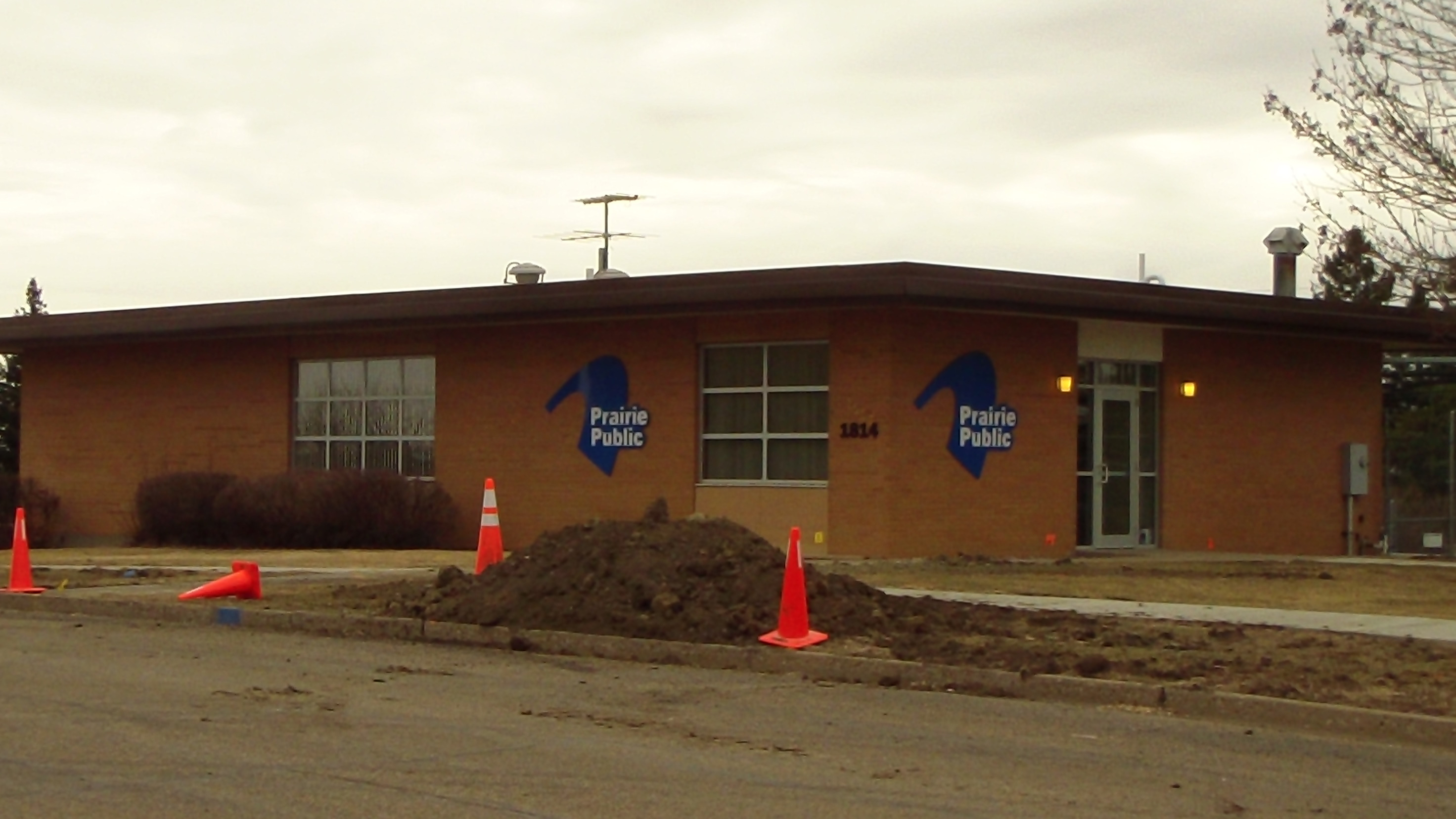
Most news and classical programming is produced at the Bismarck studio.

The primary network of Prairie Public airs classical music, news, talk, and weekend specialty shows, including jazz.

=== Roots, Rock, and Jazz network (FM2) ===
KFJM originates Prairie Public's second music format, a mixture of adult album alternative, blues, folk, and jazz. The network is rebroadcast full-time on KPPR Williston and the HD-2 channel of Prairie Public's other full-power News and Classical stations. KDSU of Fargo broadcasts the network midday weekdays and overnights.

== Stations ==
Prairie Public has 10 full power stations and 5 low-power translators broadcasting across North Dakota, northwest Minnesota, and eastern Montana.

=== News and Classical stations ===
Call sign	Frequency	City of license	FID	ERP (W)	HAAT	Class	Transmitter coordinates	FCC info
KCND	90.5 FM	Bismarck, North Dakota	53317	50000	371 m (1,217 ft)	C1	46°35′22.8″N 100°48′3.5″W	LMS
KPPD	91.7 FM	Devils Lake, North Dakota	165891	24000	214.3 m (703 ft)	C2	48°3′47.8″N 99°20′10.2″W	LMS
KDPR	89.9 FM	Dickinson, North Dakota	53326	12500	150 m (492 ft)	C2	46°43′34″N 102°54′57.6″W	LMS
KDSU	91.9 FM	Fargo, North Dakota	49213	100000	302 m (991 ft)	C	47°0′47.9″N 97°11′38.3″W	LMS
KUND-FM	89.3 FM	Grand Forks, North Dakota	69127	50000	89 m (292 ft)	C2	48°11′39.7″N 97°11′29.7″W	LMS
KPRJ	91.5 FM	Jamestown, North Dakota	53314	18500	108 m (354 ft)	B1	46°46′35.9″N 98°31′21.3″W	LMS
KMPR	88.9 FM	Minot, North Dakota	53319	50000	283 m (928 ft)	C1	48°3′3″N 101°23′25.6″W	LMS
KPPW	88.7 FM	Williston, North Dakota	174363	50000	237.4 m (779 ft)	C1	48°8′30.1″N 103°53′35.7″W	LMS

Broadcast translators for KDPR
Call sign	Frequency	City of license	FID	ERP (W)	HAAT	Class	Transmitter coordinates	FCC info
K218FO	91.5 FM	Beach, North Dakota	53341	19	32 m (105 ft)	D	46°54′33″N 104°0′25.7″W	LMS
K220FJ	91.9 FM	Bowman, North Dakota	90955	8	24 m (79 ft)	D	46°11′6″N 103°23′38.7″W	LMS
K220FG	91.9 FM	Hettinger, North Dakota	53338	9	36 m (118 ft)	D	46°0′9″N 102°37′51.6″W	LMS

Broadcast translator for KPPW
Call sign	Frequency	City of license	FID	ERP (W)	HAAT	Class	Transmitter coordinates	FCC info
K220FE	91.9 FM	Plentywood, Montana	53337	8	−27 m (−89 ft)	D	48°46′23.1″N 104°33′36.8″W	LMS

=== Roots, Rock and Jazz stations ===
Call sign	Frequency	City of license	FID	ERP (W)	HAAT	Class	Transmitter coordinates	FCC info
KFJM	90.7 FM	Grand Forks, North Dakota	69406	4000	34 m (112 ft)	A	47°54′16.9″N 97°6′54.2″W	LMS
KPPR	89.5 FM	Williston, North Dakota	53327	10500	150 m (492 ft)	C3	48°8′30.1″N 103°53′35.7″W	LMS

=== HD Radio ===
Prairie Public's full power stations broadcast HD Radio signals, adding full-digital simulcasts of their analog channel, plus the Roots, Rock, and Jazz network on subchannel "HD-2" of the News and Classical stations.

=== Cable systems ===
Shaw Cable's Winnipeg system carried Prairie Public's News and Classical service at 107.9 FM (via KUND-FM), until Shaw discontinued FM distribution in 2012.

Prairie Public's News and Classical network is carried on Bell MTS Fibe TV across Manitoba, on channel 733.

== History ==
Prairie Public was established on February 1, 1999 as the North Dakota Public Radio network. It consisted of three partners — Prairie Public Broadcasting, the North Dakota State University, and the University of North Dakota — with the goal of providing a full public radio service to all of North Dakota.

At the time of North Dakota Public Radio's formation, the University of North Dakota operated three stations in Grand Forks: KUND (AM), KUND-FM (89.3 FM) which dated to 1976, and KFJM (90.7 FM) which started in 1995. KUND (AM) had been established, as KFJM, in 1923 as one of the first college radio stations in the United States. It left the network after it was sold in 2004. North Dakota State University's station, KDSU (91.9 FM) in Fargo dated to 1966. These stations were early members of NPR, but this left western North Dakota without public radio. Prairie Public Television had broadened its mission to include radio in the late 1970s, and in 1981 KCND in Bismarck signed on as the first public radio station in the western part of the state, under the on-air name of Prairie Public Radio. Between 1981 and 1993, four more stations signed on.

On September 26, 2006, North Dakota Public Radio was renamed Prairie Public, chosen to achieve brand consistency with Prairie Public Broadcasting's television and other operations.

In 2009, KPPD signed on as a full-power station for the Devils Lake region, and HD Radio was rolled out to all Prairie Public full-power stations. In 2012, KPPW signed on as the new full-power News and Classical network station for Williston, with KPPR moving to the Roots, Rock, and Jazz network.

In September 2018, KFJM and KUND-FM were sold by the University of North Dakota to Prairie Public Broadcasting.

== See also ==
- Prairie Public Television
