= KUND-FM =

Prairie Public Radio station in Grand Forks, North Dakota

Grand Forks, North Dakota; United States
- Frequency: 89.3 MHz (HD Radio)
- Branding: Prairie Public Radio

Programming
- Format: Public; Jazz, Classical, News; HD2: Relay of KFJM Grand Forks
- Affiliations: Prairie Public, NPR

Ownership
- Owner: Prairie Public Radio; (Prairie Public Broadcasting, Inc.)
- Sister stations: KFJM

History
- First air date: May 30, 1976
- Former call signs: KFJM-FM (1976–1997)
- Call sign meaning: University of North Dakota (former owner)

Technical information
- Licensing authority: FCC
- Facility ID: 69127
- Class: C2
- ERP: 50,000 watts
- HAAT: 89 meters (292 ft)
- Transmitter coordinates: 48.194°N 97.192°W

Links
- Public license information: Public file; LMS
- Webcast: Stream
- Website: prairiepublic.org

KUND-FM (89.3 FM) is a radio station licensed to Grand Forks, North Dakota. It airs a format consisting of jazz, classical music and news and talk programming. KUND-FM and sister station KFJM share their coverage area with Minnesota Public Radio outlets KNTN and KQMN, both licensed to Thief River Falls, Minnesota. This makes Grand Forks one of the smallest markets with competing NPR stations.

== History ==
KUND-FM's first license was granted, as KFJM-FM, on June 17, 1976, operating on 89.3 MHz. It was the second station licensed to the University of North Dakota, joining the original KFJM, an AM station that dated to 1923.

In 1995, the university's third station, KFJY, began broadcasting on 90.7 MHz. On August 15, 1997, all three University of North Dakota stations changed call signs. KFJM-FM became KUND-FM, while the original KFJM became KUND and KFJY on 90.7 MHz inherited the historic KFJM call letters.

In September 2018, KUND-FM, along with KFJM, was sold by the University of North Dakota to Prairie Public Radio.
