= Painting with Paulson =

American television program

Painting with Paulson was a painting TV series hosted by artist Buck Paulson. The series teaches a variety of techniques, primarily with landscapes, using mixed oil and acrylic paints. 13 half-hour episodes have been produced annually since 1997, with all but the first season produced by Prairie Public Television. Paulson and Prairie Public have also produced more instructionally focused programs, called Painting Concepts and Beyond the Canvas.
