= Dahlen, North Dakota =

- Census-designated place & unincorporated community
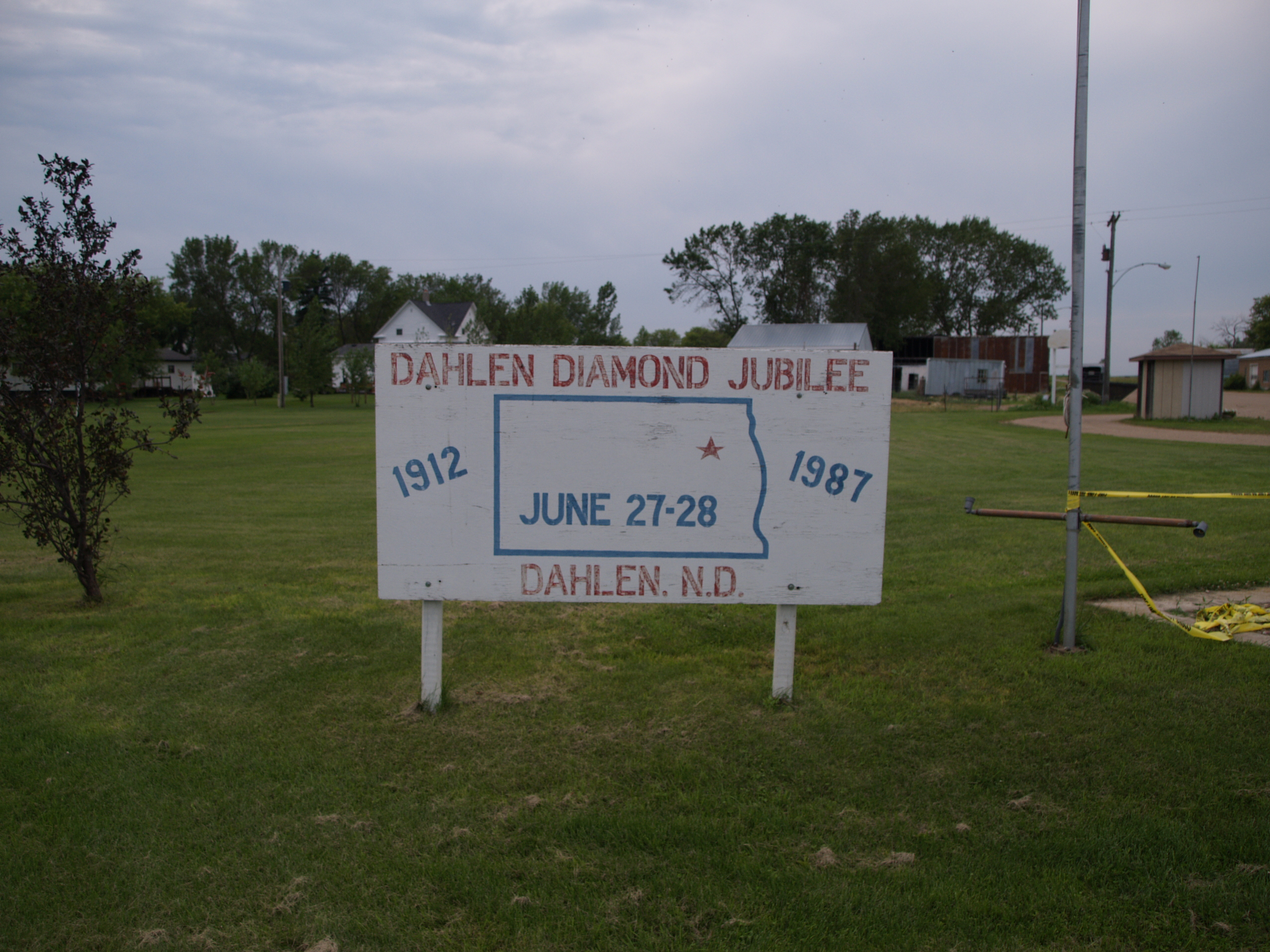

- Location within the state of North Dakota
- Coordinates: 48°09′32″N 97°55′57″W
- Country: United States
- State: North Dakota
- County: Nelson
- Founded: 1912
- Founder: Elling Nilsen Dahlen

Area
  - Total: 0.14 sq mi (0.36 km^{2})
  - Land: 0.14 sq mi (0.36 km^{2})
  - Water: 0 sq mi (0.00 km^{2})
- Elevation: 1,414 ft (431 m)

Population (2020)
  - Total: 17
  - Density: 121.6/sq mi (46.96/km^{2})
- Time zone: UTC-6 (Central (CST))
  - Summer (DST): UTC-5 (CDT)
- ZIP code: 58224
- Area code: 701
- FIPS code: 38-17620
- GNIS feature ID: 2584339

Dahlen (Urban East Norwegian: [ˈdɑːɳ]) is a census-designated place and an unincorporated community in Nelson County, North Dakota, United States. It was not counted separately during the 2000 census, but was included in the 2010 census, where a population of 18 was reported. The population was 17 at the 2020 census.

Dahlen is also the home to North Dakota's third tallest tower, the WDAZ TV Tower, which is 445.2 meters (1,461 feet) tall. The tower is used by television station WDAZ of Grand Forks. The tower was also used by KGFE of Grand Forks until an ice storm damaged equipment in 2004.

== Demographics ==
Historical population
Census	Pop.	Note	%±
2010	18		—
2020	17		−5.6%
U.S. Decennial Census; 2020 Census
