= Prairie Public Television =

PBS member network in North Dakota

Prairie Public
- statewide North Dakota; United States

Programming
- Subchannels: see § Subchannels
- Affiliations: PBS, APT

Ownership
- Owner: Prairie Public Broadcasting
- Sister stations: Prairie Public Radio

History
- First air date: January 19, 1964
- Former affiliations: NET (1964–1970)

Links
- Website: www.prairiepublic.org

Prairie Public Television is a state network of public television signals operated by Prairie Public Broadcasting. It comprises all of the PBS member stations in the U.S. state of North Dakota.

The state network is available via flagship station KFME in Fargo and eight satellite stations covering all of North Dakota, plus portions of Minnesota, Montana, and South Dakota. It also has substantial viewership in portions of the Canadian province of Manitoba. Prairie Public is also available on most satellite and cable television outlets serving North Dakota and on Hulu.

Prairie Public is headquartered on 5th Street North in Fargo, with a satellite studio on North 15th Street in Bismarck.

== History ==
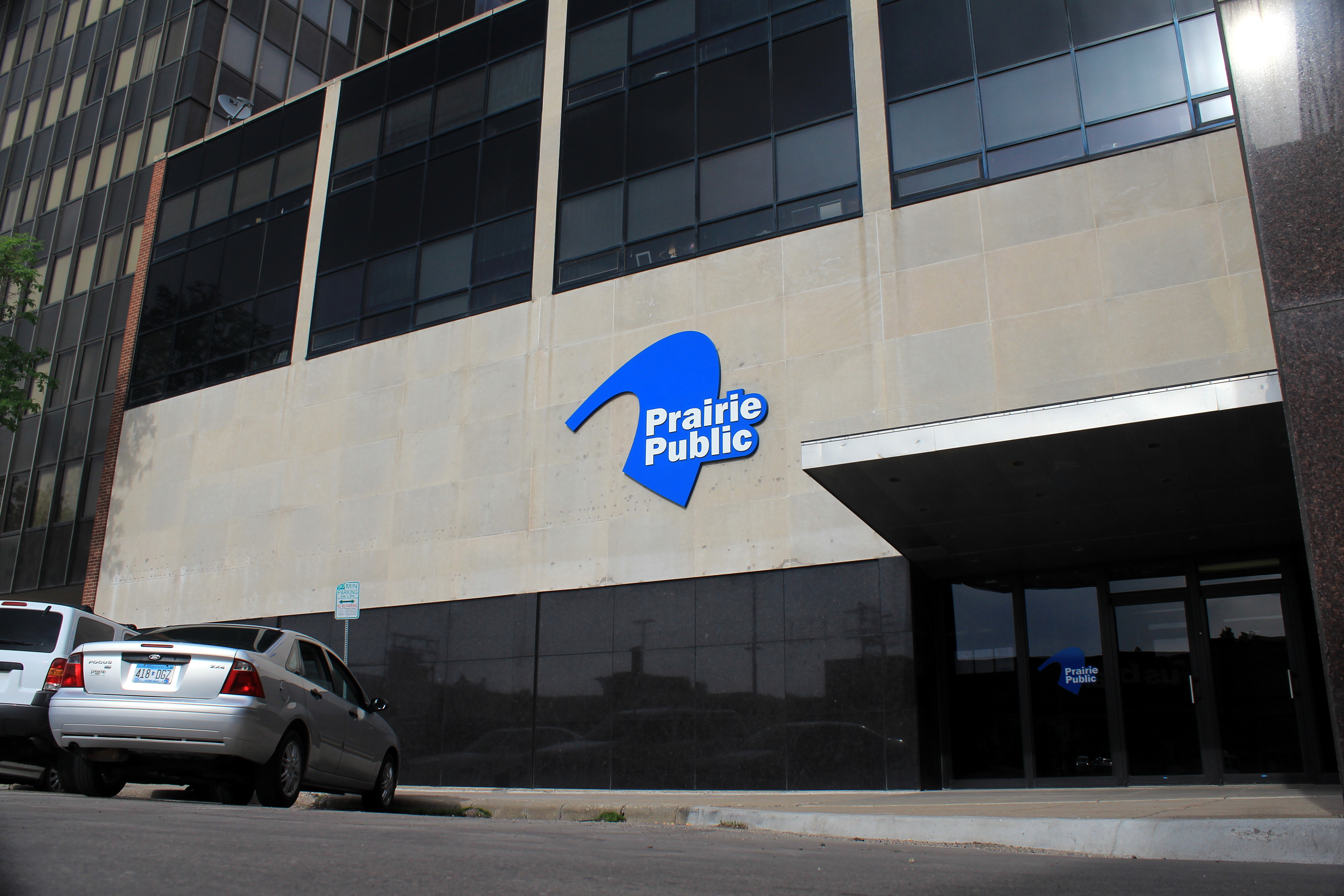
Prairie Public television studio in Fargo, North Dakota

In 1959, North Central Educational Television, the predecessor organization to Prairie Public, was incorporated. On January 19, 1964, KFME signed on from Fargo as North Dakota's first educational television station.

The Prairie Public name was adopted in 1974, the same year the first satellite station, KGFE in Grand Forks, signed on, marking the beginning of the statewide network. A year earlier, KFME almost shut down due to lack of funding. KFME acquired a color video tape recorder in 1967, and color cameras in 1975.

The FCC allocated educational frequencies to Bismarck, Minot, Williston and Dickinson in the 1960s. While KFME was picked up on cable in Bismarck in the early 1970s, most of the western part of the state was one of the few areas of the country without educational programming. It would be 1977 before the state legislature granted Prairie Public funding to build a statewide public television network. KBME in Bismarck was established in 1979, bringing over-the-air public television to the western portion of the state for the first time. KSRE in Minot followed suit in 1980 and KDSE in 1982. Prairie Public purchased the Fargo American Life Building in 1983 and moved its studios there in 1984. In 1989 KFME and cable feeds went to a 24-hour television broadcast schedule. The Prairie Satellite Network distance education state network, with 70 sites, was completed in 1994. Later, KWSE in Williston signed on in 1983, and KJRE in Ellendale/Jamestown signed on in 1992.

Prairie Public became the first broadcaster in North Dakota to broadcast in high definition, with KFME-DT and KBME-DT debuting in 2002. Digital-only station KCGE-DT Crookston/Grand Forks signed on in 2003, with the rest of the Prairie Public stations broadcasting in HDTV by 2004.

The transmitter for KGFE on the WDAZ-TV tower mast was damaged in May 2004, due to ice buildup on the tower, which caused very large chunks of ice to fall off and go through the roof of the transmitter building. This caused water damage to the transmitter's equipment, as well as damage to the roof of the transmitter site. KGFE went back on the air in February 2005 at low power, then later became a secondary station from the KCGE tower. KMDE of Devils Lake signed on in 2006 to cover the western half of KGFE's viewing area, as KCGE covered the eastern half of KGFE's viewing area.

== Manitoba ==
Prairie Public is carried on cable systems in southern Manitoba, including Winnipeg. Manitoba has historically been a significant supporter of Prairie Public. Indeed, the network's audience there is far larger than its American one; the Winnipeg area alone has almost as many people as the entire state of North Dakota.

Prairie Public has produced numerous local documentaries, including many about southern Manitoba, including Portage Avenue: Dreams of Castles in the Sky, Red River Divide, Assiniboine Park: A Park for all Seasons, Lake Winnipeg's Paradise Beaches, among others.

Prairie Public has been available in Manitoba in 1974. When KGFE signed on VHF channel 2 from the WDAZ TV Tower in Dahlen, its signal was easily received in the Morden-Winkler area. Prairie Public has been carried on cable in Manitoba since 1975, when KGFE was picked up by cable systems in Winnipeg and Brandon, Manitoba. In 1986, Prairie Public was nearly dropped from cable in Winnipeg. After the crisis, Prairie Public set up a fixed microwave link to carry stronger signals into Winnipeg. In 1998, a signal link failure forced PPTV off cable in Brandon for several months.

Not only must Prairie Public take its large Canadian audience into account in its programming, but a significant portion of its donations during fundraising drives are in Canadian dollars. The station has opened up many of its contests for Canadian residents. It also has been involved in family events in Manitoba, including the International Friendship Festival in Winnipeg, and a Mister Rogers' Neighborhood Sweater Drive.

Canadians are well-represented in Prairie Public's leadership. Two of its directors are from Winnipeg, and a Manitoban chairs the television programming advisory board.

Since KGFE's analog service went off the air in 2004, Prairie Public has been available only by cable in Manitoba. KCGE's tower is located too far east to provide an acceptable signal across the Canadian border. In 2012, MTS brought Prairie Public's signal into northern Manitoba for the first time when its Ultimate TV service launched in Thompson and The Pas. Coverage is not complete, however; cable systems as far south as Winkler use alternate PBS feeds. Prairie Public is also absent from the lineups of satellite providers Shaw Direct and Bell Satellite TV, making it unavailable to many rural residents and cottages.

Elsewhere in Canada, another local PBS member station is carried on cable in Kenora, Ontario, and is available over-the-air near Estevan, Saskatchewan. Prairie Public was formerly on cable throughout Saskatchewan, until 1984. Cable companies in Saskatchewan largely carry WTVS from Detroit instead, while SaskTel carries WGBH-TV from Boston.

== Programming ==
Many original Prairie Public productions are available on the broadcaster's YouTube channel. The stations also carry programs from PBS, American Public Television, and other distributors, as well as from independent producers.

=== Local ===
Current programs

- Prairie Pulse with John Harris
- Prairie Mosaic
- Prairie Musicians
- Painting with Paulson

==== Archives ====
Weekly regional programs

- SPIN (1976)
- North Dakota This Week (1980)
- Skyline (early 1980s)
- Prairie News Journal (1990–1997)
- PlainsTalk (1998)
- Prairie Pulse (2004–present)

=== Regional ===
As a member of Minnesota Public Television Association Prairie Public also broadcasts Almanac from Twin Cities PBS in Minneapolis–Saint Paul, as well as Minnesota Channel on Prairie Public's digital channels throughout North Dakota.

== Technical information ==
=== Transmitters ===
Prairie Public Television is serviced by nine full-power stations and four low-powered translators throughout North Dakota, western Minnesota and eastern Montana:

Prairie Public Television stations
Station	City of license	Channel; TV (RF)	Facility ID	ERP	HAAT	Transmitter coordinates	First air date	Public license information
KFME	Fargo	13 (13)	53321	56.2 kW	342 m (1,122 ft)	47°0′45″N 97°11′41″W	January 19, 1964	Public file; LMS
KGFE	Grand Forks	2 (15)	53320	22.6 kW	186.1 m (611 ft)	47°58′38″N 96°36′18″W	September 9, 1974	Public file; LMS
KBME-TV	Bismarck	3 (22)	53324	97.3 kW	392 m (1,286 ft)	46°35′23″N 100°48′2″W	June 18, 1979	Public file; LMS
KSRE	Minot	6 (15)	53313	146 kW	249.4 m (818 ft)	48°3′2″N 101°23′25″W	January 25, 1980	Public file; LMS
KDSE	Dickinson	9 (9)	53329	8.35 kW	243.5 m (799 ft)	46°43′35″N 102°54′57″W	August 4, 1982	Public file; LMS
KWSE	Williston	4 (11)	53318	84.9 kW	278 m (912 ft)	48°8′30″N 103°53′34″W	April 8, 1983	Public file; LMS
KJRE	Ellendale–Jamestown	19 (20)	53315	72.3 kW	162.5 m (533 ft)	46°17′56″N 98°51′56″W	May 11, 1992 (Note: The Broadcasting and Cable Yearbook says KJRE signed on May 12, while the Television and Cable Factbook says it signed on May 11.)	Public file; LMS
KCGE	Crookston, MN–East Grand Forks, MN	16 (16)	132606	105 kW	219.6 m (720 ft)	47°58′38″N 96°36′18″W	2003	Public file; LMS
KMDE	Devils Lake	25 (25)	162016	134 kW	244.5 m (802 ft)	48°3′47.8″N 99°20′8.7″W	2006	Public file; LMS

Prairie Public Television translators
Callsign	City of license	Channel	Facility ID	ERP	HAAT	Transmitter coordinates	Translating
K04IH-D	Baker, MT	4	3624	0.015 kW	9 m (30 ft)	46°18′45.0″N 104°12′26.7″W	KDSE
K17OB-D	Plevna, MT	17	52825	0.754 kW	42 m (138 ft)	46°20′05.0″N 104°30′46.8″W	KDSE
K13PZ-D	Poplar, MT	13	53011	0.054 kW	37 m (121 ft)	48°08′25.0″N 105°07′16.9″W	KWSE
K26PD-D	Scobey, MT	26	191359	0.239 kW	68 m (223 ft)	48°47′51.0″N 105°21′26.3″W	KWSE

=== Network map ===
Grade A signal contours for Prairie Public Television stations and associated translators.

=== Subchannels ===
All transmitters broadcast the same four subchannels.

Prairie Public Television subchannels
Channel	Res.	Short name	Programming
xx.1	1080i	PPB1	PBS
xx.2	480i	PPB2	World
xx.3	480i	PPB3	Minnesota Channel (Note: KGFE carries the Minnesota Channel in 1080i high-definition resolution; all other transmitters carry it in 480i standard definition.)
xx.4	480i	PPB4	PBS Kids

=== Analog-to-digital conversion ===
Prairie Public's stations converted to digital during the 2009 analog-to-digital transition on a staggered basis. KBME-TV, KSRE and KJRE shut down their analog transmitters on February 17, 2009, with all three remaining on their pre-transition digital signals (UHF channel 22, UHF channel 40 and UHF channel 20, respectively). KFME, KGFE, KDSE and KWSE shut down their analog transmitters on June 12, 2009. KFME's digital signal relocated from pre-transition UHF channel 23 to VHF channel 13; KGFE's digital signal relocated from pre-transition UHF channel 56 to UHF channel 15; KDSE's digital signal relocated from pre-transition UHF channel 20 to VHF channel 9; and KWSE's digital signal remained on pre-transition UHF channel 51. KCGE-DT and KMDE were digital-only stations when they signed on, but both temporarily suspended transmissions during the transition process.

=== Cable and satellite ===
Prairie Public is carried on many cable systems in North Dakota, as well as on a number of cable systems in northwestern Minnesota and eastern Montana. In Manitoba, Prairie Public is carried by Shaw Cable on most systems south of the Interlake (including Winnipeg), and by Westman across southwest Manitoba. MTS carries Prairie Public on their phone-line service, MTS TV. In Ontario, Shaw Cable carries Prairie Public in Kenora.

On satellite, KFME is carried on the Fargo/Grand Forks DirecTV and Dish Network local feeds, while KBME is carried on the Bismarck/Minot/Williston/Dickinson DirecTV and Dish Network feeds.

== See also ==
- Prairie Public Radio
