= KDSU =

Prairie Public Radio station in Fargo, North Dakota, United States

- Fargo, North Dakota; United States
- Frequency: 91.9 MHz (HD Radio)
- Branding: Prairie Public Radio

Programming
- Format: Public; News, adult album alternative, Classical, Jazz; HD2: Relay of KFJM Grand Forks
- Affiliations: Prairie Public, NPR

Ownership
- Owner: North Dakota State University

History
- First air date: 1952 (carrier current on AM); January 17, 1966 (on FM)
- Last air date: 1964 (carrier current on AM)
- Call sign meaning: North Dakota State University

Technical information
- Licensing authority: FCC
- Facility ID: 49213
- Class: C
- ERP: 100,000 watts
- HAAT: 302 meters (991 ft)
- Transmitter coordinates: 47°00′47.9″N 97°11′38.3″W

Links
- Public license information: Public file; LMS
- Webcast: Stream
- Website: prairiepublic.org

KDSU (91.9 FM) is a radio station licensed to Fargo, North Dakota. The station is owned by North Dakota State University, but is operated by Prairie Public Radio. It airs NPR news and talk programming for most of the day, but simulcasts KFJM's Roots, Rock and Jazz programming from 9 am to 3 pm and from 8 pm to 4 am on weekdays. The rest of the main Prairie Public Radio network airs classical music during these times.

KDSU shares its coverage area with Moorhead, Minnesota-based Minnesota Public Radio outlets KCCD and KCCM, making Fargo/Moorhead one of the smallest markets with competing NPR member stations.

== History ==
In 1952, students at the then-North Dakota Agricultural College signed on a very low-powered campus AM carrier current station. It adopted the fictional call letters "KDSC""; since the station didn't need a license, this was never officially assigned by the Federal Communications Commission. The station began using "KDSU" as an identifier sometime in the early 1960s, after the college became North Dakota State University. It went off the air in 1964 due to technical difficulties.

It returned on June 17, 1966 as a fully licensed FM station, now officially assigned the KDSU call letters. It originally tried to satisfy all tastes, airing jazz, blues, folk music, classical music, rock and opera. By 1981, however, it had evolved into a more traditional public radio station, airing news and jazz during the week and specialty programming on weekends.
