= WDAY-TV =

Television station in Fargo, North Dakota

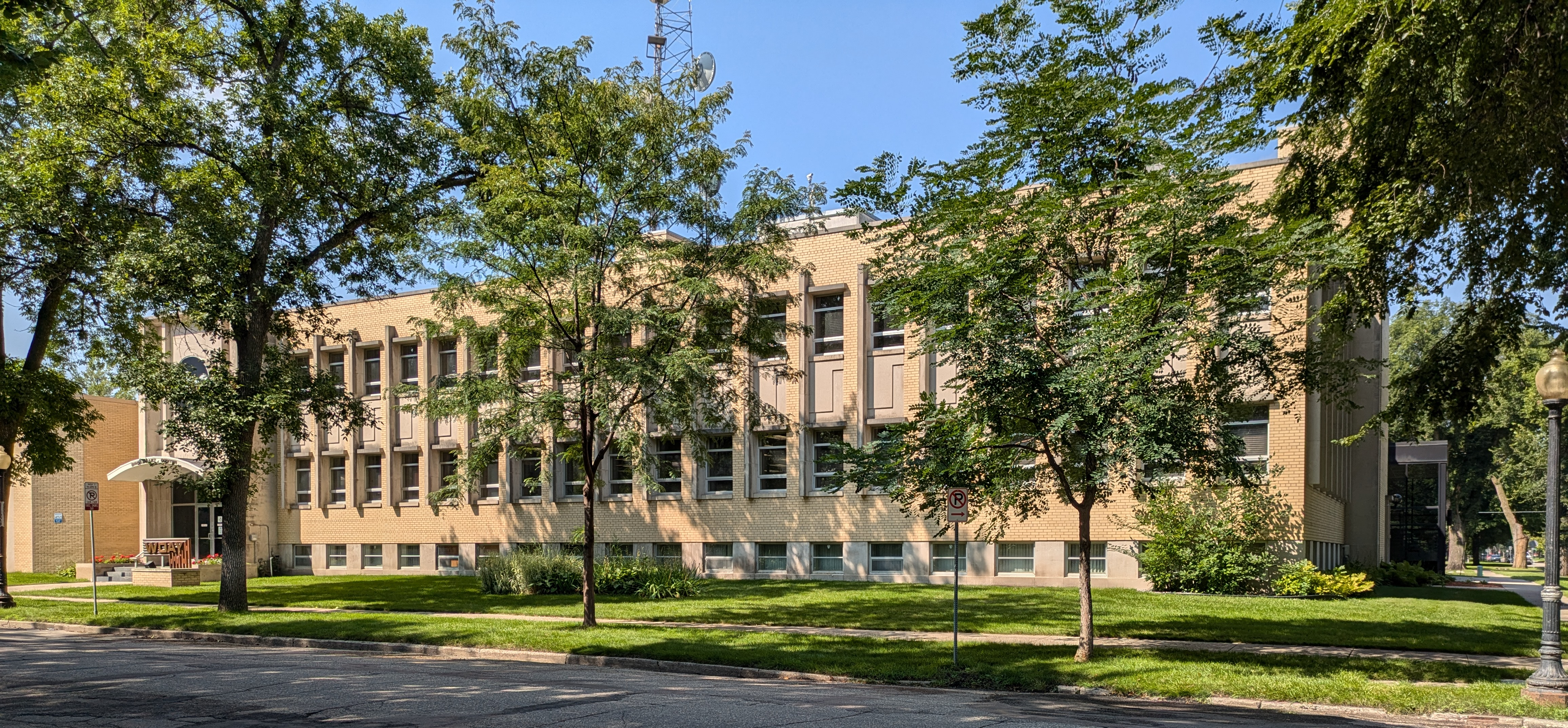
- Broadcast Center in Fargo
- Fargo, North Dakota; Moorhead, Minnesota; United States
- City: Fargo, North Dakota
- Channels: Digital: 21 (UHF); Virtual: 6
- Branding: WDAY; WDAY News, The News Leader; WDAY Xtra (6.3)

Programming
- Affiliations: 6.1: ABC; for others, see § Technical information and subchannels

Ownership
- Owner: Forum Communications Company
- Sister stations: WDAZ-TV

History
- First air date: May 28, 1953
- Former channel numbers: Analog: 6 (VHF, 1953–2009)
- Former affiliations: NBC (1953–1983); CBS (secondary, 1953−1954); DuMont (secondary, 1953−1955); ABC (secondary, 1953–1959)
- Call sign meaning: taken from former sister radio station WDAY, which was randomly assigned by the FCC

Technical information
- Licensing authority: FCC
- Facility ID: 22129
- ERP: 1,000 kW
- HAAT: 322 m (1,056 ft)
- Transmitter coordinates: 47°0′28″N 97°12′3″W

Links
- Public license information: Public file; LMS
- Website: www.wday.com

WDAY-TV (channel 6) is a television station in Fargo, North Dakota, United States, affiliated with ABC. It serves as the flagship television property of locally based Forum Communications Company, which also owns The Forum of Fargo-Moorhead. WDAY-TV's studios are located on South 8th Street in downtown Fargo, and its transmitter is located near Amenia.

== Semi-satellites ==
WDAY-TV serves one of the largest geographic viewing areas of any station in the United States. It consists of all of North Dakota as well as northwestern Minnesota, northern South Dakota, and eastern Montana. It covers this region with a network of three full-power semi-satellites: WDAZ-TV (channel 8) in Grand Forks, KBMY (channel 17) in Bismarck, and KMCY (channel 14) in Minot, which itself is a semi-satellite of KBMY.

=== WDAZ-TV ===
WDAZ-TV (channel 8), serving Grand Forks and licensed to Devils Lake, operates as a semi-satellite of WDAY-TV. As such, it simulcasts all network and syndicated programming as provided through WDAY-TV, and the two stations share a website. However, WDAZ-TV airs separate legal identifications and commercial inserts targeting the Grand Forks metro and northern portion of the Fargo–Grand Forks market. Local newscasts, produced by WDAY-TV, are simulcast on both stations. The two stations are counted as a single unit for ratings purposes. WDAZ has long been available on cable in Manitoba, Canada, including Winnipeg, which has double the population of the Fargo–Grand Forks market. WDAZ also claims far western Ontario, including Kenora, as part of its coverage area.

=== KBMY/KMCY ===
KBMY (channel 17) in Bismarck, and KMCY (channel 14) in Minot, clear all network programming as provided through WDAY-TV and simulcast WDAY-TV's newscasts, but airs a separate offering of syndicated programming; there are also separate commercial inserts and legal station identifications. Internal operations are based at WDAY-TV's studios in Fargo. Since August 2026, subchannels of the two stations have served as the CBS affiliates for western North Dakota.

== History ==
The construction on the transmitter tower began on March 1953. WDAY-TV began test broadcasts on May 28, 1953, and officially started its daily schedule on June 1, 1953, as the second television station in North Dakota (after KCJB-TV, now KXMC-TV, in Minot) and the first in Fargo and the eastern part of the state. It was owned by a group of Fargo investors led by Norman Black, owner and publisher of The Forum. It took its call letters from WDAY radio, which was owned by The Forum from 1935 to 2024. Black bought the remaining shares in 1958.

It originally carried programming from all four networks of the day–CBS, NBC, ABC and DuMont. However, it was a primary NBC affiliate owing to its radio sister's long affiliation with NBC radio. It lost CBS to KXJB-TV (channel 4) in 1954, lost DuMont later in 1955 as that network was winding up operations, and lost ABC in 1959 when KXGO-TV (channel 11, now KVLY-TV) signed on. In 1983, WDAY-TV swapped affiliations with channel 11, then known as KTHI-TV, and became an ABC affiliate.

Although it was apparent that Fargo and Grand Forks were going to be a single market, channel 6 did not cover the northern portion of this vast market very well. It was required to conform its signal to protect CBC Television's Winnipeg station, CBWT, which took to the air on channel 6 a year after WDAY-TV signed on. As a result, it was barely viewable in northern Grand Forks and could not be seen at all in much of the northern part of the market. To solve this problem, it signed on WDAZ-TV in 1967 as a semi-satellite for the northern portion of the market.

WDAY-TV and WDAZ-TV used these logos in 1972–73 (top) and 1973–74 (bottom).

WDAY-TV and WDAZ-TV began operating cable-only WB affiliate "WBFG" in 1998. WDAY/WDAZ replaced The CW Plus successor of "WBFG" with the Justice Network (which moved from 6.4) on new digital broadcast subchannels WDAY 6.2 and WDAZ 8.2 on September 12, 2016, and WDAY'Z Xtra (which launched in 2013) on digital subchannel 6.3 in the Fargo area and 8.3 in the Grand Forks area. WDAY-DT4 returned to the air in 2017 as an affiliate of Ion Television.

WDAY-TV is one of the westernmost stations in the country whose call sign begins with W. Most stations west of the Mississippi River begin with K; however, WDAY radio signed on in 1922, a year before the U.S. government moved the K-W boundary from the state borders between 102 and 104 degrees West longitude (including the North Dakota–Montana border) to the Mississippi River.

== WDAY Xtra ==
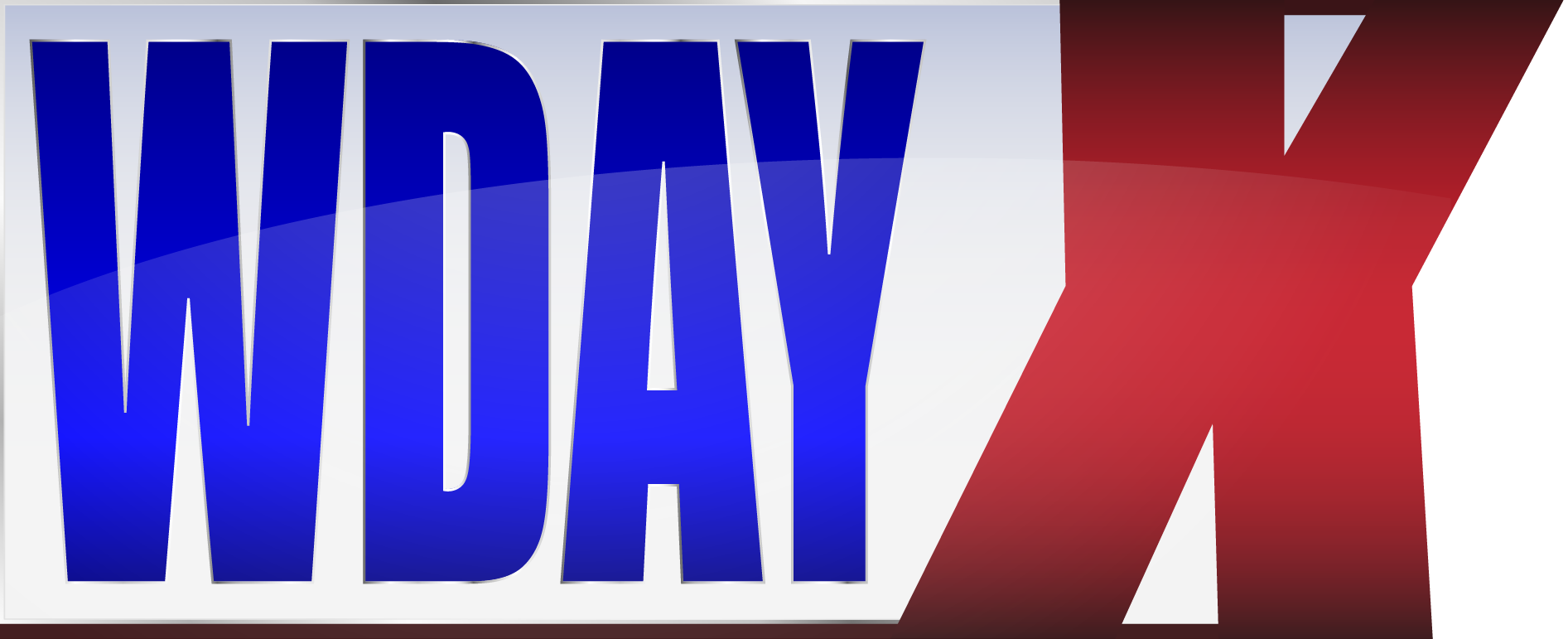
WDAY Xtra logo

WDAY Xtra is a digital subchannel carried on WDAY 6.3, WDAZ 8.3, KBMY 17.3, and KMCY 14.3, programmed as an independent station, with a secondary MyNetworkTV affiliation on KBMY and KMCY. This subchannel airs syndicated programming, North Dakota and Minnesota high school sports, North Dakota high school state tournaments, Minnesota State University Moorhead athletics, and select North Dakota State University athletic events.

WDAY Xtra became available in HD in 2014, and in 2016, MyNetworkTV programming began airing in prime time, although on KBMY and KMCY only (in Bismarck and Minot respectively) but not on WDAY or WDAZ; KRDK-TV in Valley City serves as Fargo's MyNetworkTV affiliate.

== News operation and programming ==
WDAY-TV presently broadcasts 36 1/2 hours of locally produced newscasts and other programming each week (with 6 1/2 hours each weekday, 2 1/2 hours on Saturdays, and two hours on Sundays). WDAY's newscasts have traditionally led the ratings in the Fargo–Grand Forks market.

WDAZ once had a larger news presence, as it aired separate 5 p.m., 6 p.m., 10 p.m., and weekend newscasts, with the only WDAY newscast airing being the morning First News. WDAZ's weekend news was taken over by WDAY in 2011 and its 5 p.m. weekday newscast was taken over in July 2014. The decision to replace the 5 p.m. broadcast was met with an immediate backlash from viewers, including those who circulated a petition on Change.org demanding that Forum restore the local 5 p.m. news to WDAZ.

On February 22, 2012, WDAY-TV began broadcasting its local newscasts in high definition. KBMY and KMCY began airing some of WDAY's newscasts in 2014.

WDAY-TV signs off briefly in the overnight hours; as a result, ABC's overnight news program, World News Now, is not broadcast. The station goes off the air at 3:37 a.m. and signs on again at 4 a.m. to broadcast America This Morning.

In August 2016, WDAY-TV launched a half-hour prime time newscast on its second and third subchannels called WDAY Xtra News at 9. It is simulcast on WDAZ's subchannels in Grand Forks, as well as KBMY/KMCY's subchannels in the Bismarck–Minot market.

On September 11, 2017, WDAY-TV launched a 4 p.m. weekday newscast that is simulcast on sister station WDAZ. It was the first afternoon newscast ever to air in the market.

On November 30, 2018, it was announced that WDAZ would merge its news department with that of WDAY-TV, resulting in the cancellation of WDAZ's separate 6 and 10 p.m. newscasts, effective December 21. General manager Joshua Rohrer cited "changes to distribution of television, emerging technologies and economic factors in our area" as reasons for the consolidation, in a statement to the Grand Forks Herald. WDAY-TV continues to maintain a news bureau and sales office in Grand Forks.

On September 5, 2021, WDAY-TV launched a Sunday morning newscast that is simulcast on sister stations WDAZ and KBMY/KMCY. It was the first Sunday morning newscast to air in the market.

=== Past on-air staff ===
- Ed Schultz

== Technical information and subchannels ==
WDAY-TV's transmitter is located near Amenia, North Dakota. The station's signal is multiplexed:

Subchannels of WDAY-TV
Subchannel	Res.	Short name	Programming
6.1	720p	WDAYABC	ABC
6.2	720p	CRIME	True Crime Network
6.3	720p	XTRA	WDAY X
6.4	480i	ION	Ion
6.5	480i	IONPLUS	Ion Plus
6.6	480i	GRIT	Grit

=== Analog-to-digital conversion ===
WDAY-TV shut down its analog signal, over VHF channel 6, on June 12, 2009, the official date on which full-power television stations in the United States transitioned from analog to digital broadcasts under federal mandate. The station's digital signal remained on its pre-transition UHF channel 21, using virtual channel 6.

== See also ==
- Channel 6 virtual TV stations in the United States
- Channel 7 branded TV stations in the United States
- Channel 8 branded TV stations in the United States
- Channel 21 digital TV stations in the United States
