= WDAZ-TV =

Television station in Devils Lake, North Dakota

Semi-satellite of WDAY-TV, Fargo, North Dakota
- Devils Lake–Grand Forks, North Dakota; United States
- City: Devils Lake, North Dakota
- Channels: Digital: 8 (VHF); Virtual: 8
- Branding: WDAZ; WDAY News

Programming
- Affiliations: 8.1: ABC; for others, see § Technical information and subchannels

Ownership
- Owner: Forum Communications Company
- Sister stations: WDAY-TV

History
- First air date: January 29, 1967
- Former channel numbers: Analog: 8 (VHF, 1967–2009); Digital: 59 (UHF, until 2009)
- Former affiliations: NBC (1967–1983)
- Call sign meaning: disambiguation from WDAY-TV as second station

Technical information
- Licensing authority: FCC
- Facility ID: 22124
- ERP: 19 kW
- HAAT: 451 m (1,480 ft)
- Transmitter coordinates: 48°8′18″N 97°59′36″W
- Translator(s): see § Translators

Links
- Public license information: Public file; LMS
- Website: www.wday.com

WDAZ-TV (channel 8) is a television station licensed to Devils Lake, North Dakota, United States, serving the Grand Forks area as an affiliate of ABC. It is owned by the Forum Communications Company, which also owns the Grand Forks Herald. WDAZ-TV's news bureau and advertising sales office are located on South Washington Street in Grand Forks, and its transmitter is located near Dahlen, North Dakota. Despite Devils Lake being WDAZ-TV's city of license, the station maintains no physical presence there.

Although identifying as a separate station in its own right, WDAZ-TV is considered a semi-satellite of sister station and company flagship WDAY-TV (channel 6) in Fargo, which operates two other semi-satellites: KBMY (channel 17) in Bismarck and KMCY (channel 14) in Minot, which itself is a semi-satellite of KBMY. As such, WDAZ-TV simulcasts all network and syndicated programming as provided by WDAY-TV, and the two stations share a website. However, WDAZ-TV airs separate commercial inserts and legal identifications. Local newscasts, produced by WDAY-TV, are simulcast on both stations. WDAZ-TV serves the northern half of the Fargo–Grand Forks market while WDAY-TV serves the southern portion. The two stations are counted as a single unit for ratings purposes. Internal operations are based at WDAY-TV's studios on South 8th Street in Fargo.

WDAZ-TV is widely carried on cable in the Canadian province of Manitoba (including Winnipeg, Portage la Prairie, Selkirk, Steinbach and Winkler), and in Kenora, Ontario.

== History ==
WDAY-TV and WDAZ-TV used these logos in 1972–73 (top) and 1973–74 (bottom).

WDAZ-TV began test broadcasts in December 1966, and went on the air for the first time on January 29, 1967. The station began to broadcast local color programs in July 1969. For its first 15 years on the air, WDAY-TV had significant coverage problems in the northern portion of the vast Fargo–Grand Forks market. Channel 6 was required to conform its signal to protect CBC Television station CBWT in Winnipeg, which was also on channel 6. While the other Fargo stations covered the northern portion of the market very well, WDAY-TV only provided grade B coverage to most of Grand Forks and could not be seen at all in much of the northern part of the market. WDAZ was signed on to fill this coverage gap. (WDAY's coverage problem would become moot with the 2009 digital television transition in the United States and the 2011 transition in Canada, in which WDAY would broadcast its digital signal on channel 21 and CBWT broadcast theirs on channel 27.) It is one of the few stations west of the Mississippi River allowed to use a "W" call sign at sign-on. Most stations west of the Mississippi begin with the K; however, WDAY radio received its call letters before the U.S. Government moved the K-W boundary in 1923 from the state borders between 102 and 104 degrees West longitude (including the North Dakota–Montana border) to the Mississippi River.

Originally an NBC affiliate, WDAZ switched to ABC along with sister station WDAY-TV on August 22, 1983.

WDAY/WDAZ began operating cable-only WB affiliate "WBFG" in 1998. WDAY/WDAZ replaced The CW Plus successor of "WBFG" with the Justice Network (which launched in early 2016) on new digital broadcast subchannels WDAY 6.2 and WDAZ 8.2 and WDAY'Z Xtra (which launched in 2013) on digital subchannel 6.3 in the Fargo area and 8.3 in the Grand Forks area. WDAZ-DT4 returned to the air in 2017 as an affiliate of Ion Television.

== WDAY Xtra ==
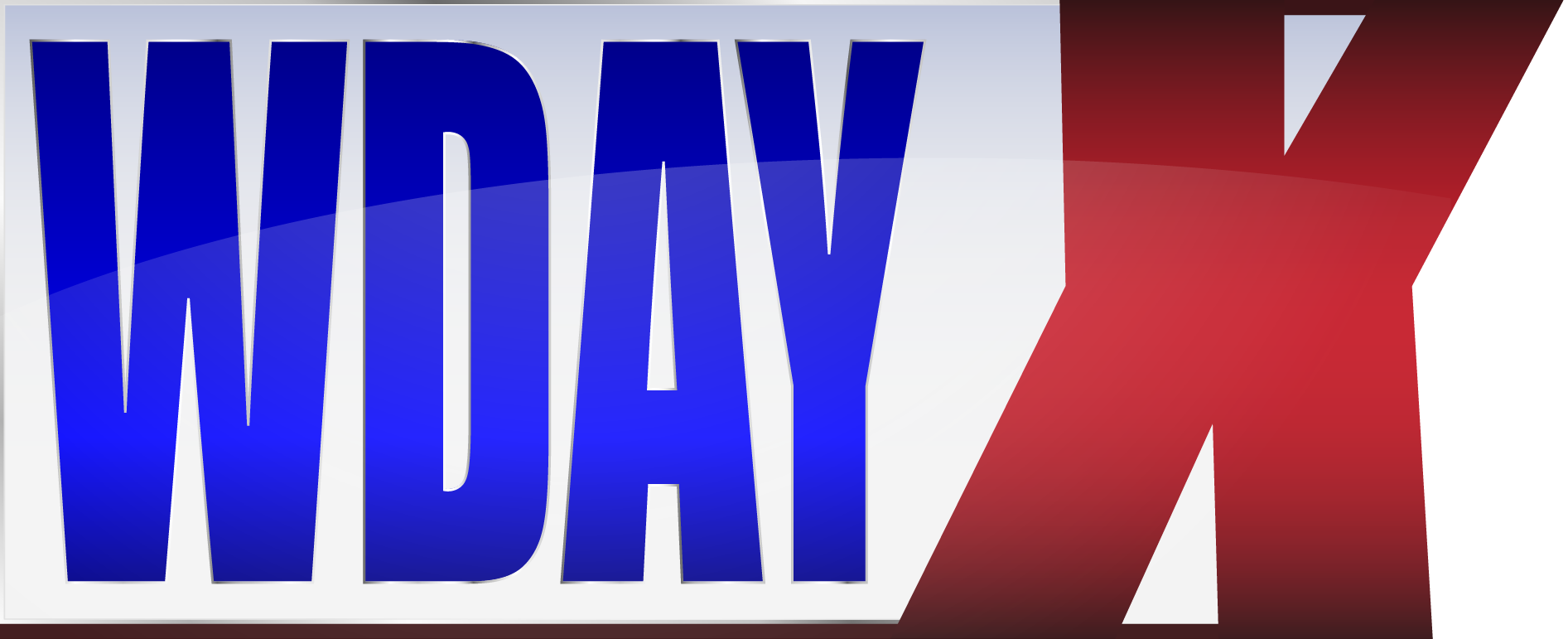
WDAY Xtra logo

WDAY Xtra is a digital subchannel carried on WDAY 6.3, WDAZ 8.3, KBMY 17.3, and KMCY 14.3, programmed as an independent station, with a secondary MyNetworkTV affiliation on KBMY and KMCY. This subchannel airs syndicated programming, North Dakota and Minnesota high school sports, North Dakota high school state tournaments, Minnesota State University Moorhead athletics, and select North Dakota State University athletic events. It airs Doppler weather radar and "Storm Tracker" weather loop with easy listening music during overnights. It is offered on Midco cable channel 596 and Sparklight channel 29.

WDAY Xtra became available in HD in 2014, and in 2016, MyNetworkTV programming began airing in prime time on the version of the subchannel seen on KBMY and KMCY but not on WDAY or WDAZ (MyNetworkTV was seen in Grand Forks on KCPM before its license was canceled in 2020, and on KRDK-TV from Valley City–Fargo since 2021).

== News operation and programming ==
Until December 21, 2018, WDAZ aired its own locally produced newscasts from Grand Forks on weekdays at 6 and 10 p.m. (five hours each week), and simulcast WDAY-TV's other newscasts with resources from WDAZ. From 1997 until 2011, WDAZ broadcast nine hours of locally produced newscasts each week (with 1 1/2 hours each weekday, one hour on Saturdays, and the 30-minute Sunday 10 p.m. newscast).

WDAY's morning show First News has been broadcast on WDAZ since its inception, although the broadcast went statewide in April 2014 as it debuted on sister ABC affiliates KBMY in Bismarck and KMCY in Minot. WDAZ's weekend news was taken over by WDAY in 2011 and its 5 p.m. weekday newscast was taken over in July 2014. The decision to replace the 5 p.m. broadcast, which had been anchored by long-time personality Terry Dullum, was met with an immediate backlash from viewers, including those who circulated a petition on Change.org demanding that Forum restore the local 5 p.m. news to WDAZ. General manager Mari Ossenfort defended the cutbacks at WDAZ, believing that the stations were to focus more on producing "content" rather than "shows".

WDAZ is noted for being nationally honored with the prestigious Edward R. Murrow Award for Continuing Coverage during the Red River Flood of 1997. WDAZ received two Upper Midwest Regional Emmy Awards in 2014.

On February 22, 2012, WDAZ began presenting its local newscasts in 16:9 widescreen standard definition, while the morning and weekend newscasts originating from WDAY were presented in high definition. WDAZ began presenting its locally produced newscasts in high definition on October 15, 2013.

WDAZ signs off briefly in the overnight hours; as a result, ABC's overnight news program, World News Now, is not broadcast. The station goes off the air at 3:37 a.m. and signs on again at 4 a.m. to broadcast America This Morning. WDAZ previously broadcast a weekly political talk show called Agenda, which was primarily on local and regional issues.

Starting on August 29, 2016, WDAY Xtra and the Justice Network aired WDAY Xtra News weekdays at 9 p.m.

WDAZ began airing a 4 p.m. weekday newscast on September 11, 2017, that originates from Fargo–based sister station WDAY-TV. It was the first afternoon newscast ever to air in the market.

On November 30, 2018, it was announced that WDAZ would merge its news department with that of WDAY-TV, resulting in the cancellation of WDAZ's separate 6 and 10 p.m. newscasts, effective December 21. General manager Joshua Roher cited "changes to distribution of television, emerging technologies and economic factors in our area" as reasons for the consolidation, in a statement to the Grand Forks Herald. WDAZ's studio continued as WDAY-TV's Grand Forks news bureau and sales office.

=== Sports coverage ===
WDAZ was known for its coverage of University of North Dakota athletics, with former longtime sports director Pat Sweeney serving as play-by-play announcer. The station produced telecasts in conjunction with the University of North Dakota for its own airwaves, often simulcast on its sister ABC stations statewide, from 1984 until 2012. UND play-by-play coverage began being simulcast on WDAZ's airwaves and a cable network known as the University of North Dakota Sports Network (UNDSN, formerly the Fighting Sioux Sports Network or FSSN), which was launched in 2002. This network broadcast UND hockey, football, and basketball games which were distributed on cable television by Midcontinent Communications and other cable systems in North Dakota, Minnesota, and South Dakota. The UND Sports Network was also available all across the North American continent via free-to-air satellite. Pat Sweeney also handled play-by-play commentating on UNDSN. UNDSN was folded into the regional Midco Sports Network in 2012, and UND athletics play-by-play broadcast rights were taken over by the new regional network.

== Technical information and subchannels ==
WDAZ-TV's transmitter is located near Dahlen, North Dakota. The station's signal is multiplexed:

Subchannels of WDAZ-TV
Subchannel	Res.	Short name	Programming
8.1	720p	WDAZABC	ABC
8.2	480i	CRIME	True Crime Network
8.3	720p	XTRA	WDAY Xtra
8.4	480i	ION	Ion
8.5	480i	IONPLUS	Ion Plus
8.6	480i	GRIT	Grit

True Crime Network is carried on a digital subchannel of WDAY 6.2 in Fargo, WDAZ 8.2 in Devils Lake/Grand Forks, KBMY 17.2 in Bismarck and KMCY 14.2 in Minot. WDAY 6.2 and WDAZ 8.2 were previously Fargo CW (the successor to Fargo WB "WBFG") until that network's affiliation moved to KXJB-LD 30.2/28.2 in September 2016.

=== Analog-to-digital conversion ===
WDAZ-TV shut down its analog signal, over VHF channel 8, on February 17, 2009, the original target date on which full-power television stations in the United States were to transition from analog to digital broadcasts under federal mandate (which was later pushed back to June 12, 2009). The station's digital signal relocated from its pre-transition UHF channel 59, which was among the high band UHF channels (52–69) that were removed from broadcasting use as a result of the transition, to its analog-era VHF channel 8.

=== WDAZ-TV tower mast ===
WDAZ-TV broadcasts from a 445.2-meter (1,461 ft) high guy-wired aerial mast, making it the third tallest tower in North Dakota after the KVLY-TV tower and the KRDK-TV tower. The tower is located in Dahlen, North Dakota, roughly located between Grand Forks and Devils Lake. The tower was also used by Prairie Public Television's KGFE until an ice storm damaged equipment in 2004.

=== Translators ===
WDAZ serves its large coverage area with three translators. All are owned by local municipalities.

==== Active translators ====
- K16KE-D Baudette, Minnesota
- K28PL-D Roseau, Minnesota
- K36LW-D Williams, Minnesota

==== Defunct translators ====
- K51EX Belcourt, North Dakota
- K57AS Grygla, Minnesota
- K67BC Norris Camp (Roosevelt, Minnesota)

== Out-of-market and Canadian coverage ==
Although WDAZ reaches only 82,000 American television households, the station is also carried on Shaw Communications and MTS TV in southern Manitoba, including the Winnipeg area, reaching an additional 256,000 homes. Winnipeg is the center of a market with over 1 million people—more than three times the entire population of WDAZ's American coverage area (and indeed double the entire population of the Fargo–Grand Forks market).

WDAZ continues to be carried on Canadian cable systems, while other North Dakota broadcasts were replaced with stations from Detroit and/or Toledo, Ohio, and then Minneapolis–Saint Paul station KARE. WDAZ even maintained a sales office in Winnipeg. In 1986, WDAZ was nearly dropped from cable in Winnipeg. After the crisis, WDAZ and Prairie Public Television's KGFE set up a fixed microwave link to carry stronger signals into Winnipeg.

WDAZ and Prairie Public Television (through KGFE) are the only Fargo stations that still air in Manitoba, after KVLY-TV (formerly KTHI) and KXJB-TV were replaced with other network affiliates in March 1986. This was due to a Canadian Radio-television and Telecommunications Commission (CRTC) decision that allowed the Winnipeg cable companies to replace the CBS and NBC affiliates with Detroit stations (WJBK (later WWJ-TV) and WDIV-TV, respectively) because of complaints about poor reception, but denied them the ability to replace WDAZ with WXYZ or KGFE/PPT with WTVS (although the latter station would later be added as a second PBS station to cable customers). Shaw Cable airs WDAZ on cable channel 7 and MTS TV airs WDAZ on cable channel 13. For several years in the 1980s, WDAZ was also fed in Saskatchewan as a replacement for KTHI on its Telecable (Saskatoon) (now Shaw Communications) and Cable Regina (now Access Communications) systems, before it (along with two Williston stations and PPT) were also replaced by Detroit stations in the aftermath of a similar CRTC decision in October 1984.

WDAZ can also be seen over the air in extreme southern Manitoba, and in southern parts of Winnipeg, with a rooftop antenna. WDAZ's over-the-air signal is spotty at best in Manitoba, as its transmitter is more than 100 miles (160 km) from Winnipeg.

WDAZ sometimes airs ads from Winnipeg businesses, although this is sometimes ineffective due to simultaneous substitution. This practice requires Shaw and MTS to replace WDAZ's signal with that of a Winnipeg station (usually either CKY-DT, CKND-DT, or CHMI-DT) whenever the same program and episode airs at the same time. Because WDAZ is carried on cable in southern Manitoba, it has become somewhat of a regional superstation.

WDAZ is also available on cable or IPTV providers in the northeastern portion of the Minot–Bismarck market (in Rolette, Pierce and Wells counties). Cable or IPTV providers in this area, which includes Belcourt, Rolla, Rugby, Harvey, and Fessenden, have carried WDAZ for decades, and have continued to do so despite the presence of sister ABC affiliate KMCY in Minot. WDAZ is also carried in Red Lake, Minnesota (Beltrami County), located on the northern edge of the Minneapolis–Saint Paul television market.

== See also ==
- Grand Forks Herald
- WDAY-TV
- KBMY/KMCY
- WDAY (AM)
- Channel 8 digital TV stations in the United States
- Channel 8 virtual TV stations in the United States
