= WDAY (AM) =

- Fargo, North Dakota; United States
- Broadcast area: Fargo-Moorhead media market
- Frequency: 970 kHz
- Branding: 970 WDAY AM and 93.1 FM

Programming
- Format: News–talk
- Affiliations: ABC News Radio; Bloomberg Radio; Westwood One; KVLY-TV

Ownership
- Owner: Flag Family Media; (Bakken Beacon Media LLC)
- Sister stations: WZFG

History
- First air date: June 14, 1922
- Call sign meaning: Randomly assigned by the Department of Commerce

Technical information
- Licensing authority: FCC
- Facility ID: 22126
- Class: B
- Power: 10,000 watts
- Transmitter coordinates: 46°38′47.9″N 96°21′51.2″W
- Translator: 93.1 K226CL (Fargo)

Links
- Public license information: Public file; LMS
- Webcast: Listen Live
- Website: wdayradionow.com

WDAY (970 kHz "News-Talk 970 AM and 93.1 FM") is North Dakota's oldest radio station, having first signed on in 1922. WDAY is licensed to Fargo, North Dakota, owned and operated by Flag Family Media alongside WZFG. The transmitter site is near 210th Street South in Barnesville, Minnesota, and studios are on 8th Street South in Fargo.

WDAY's power is 10,000 watts, and its transmitter site has three towers. Two towers are used for the daytime directional antenna, and all three at night, in order to protect other stations on 970 kHz from interference. WDAY's daytime signal covers the eastern half of North Dakota, west central Minnesota, northeastern South Dakota, and southern Manitoba.

== Programming ==
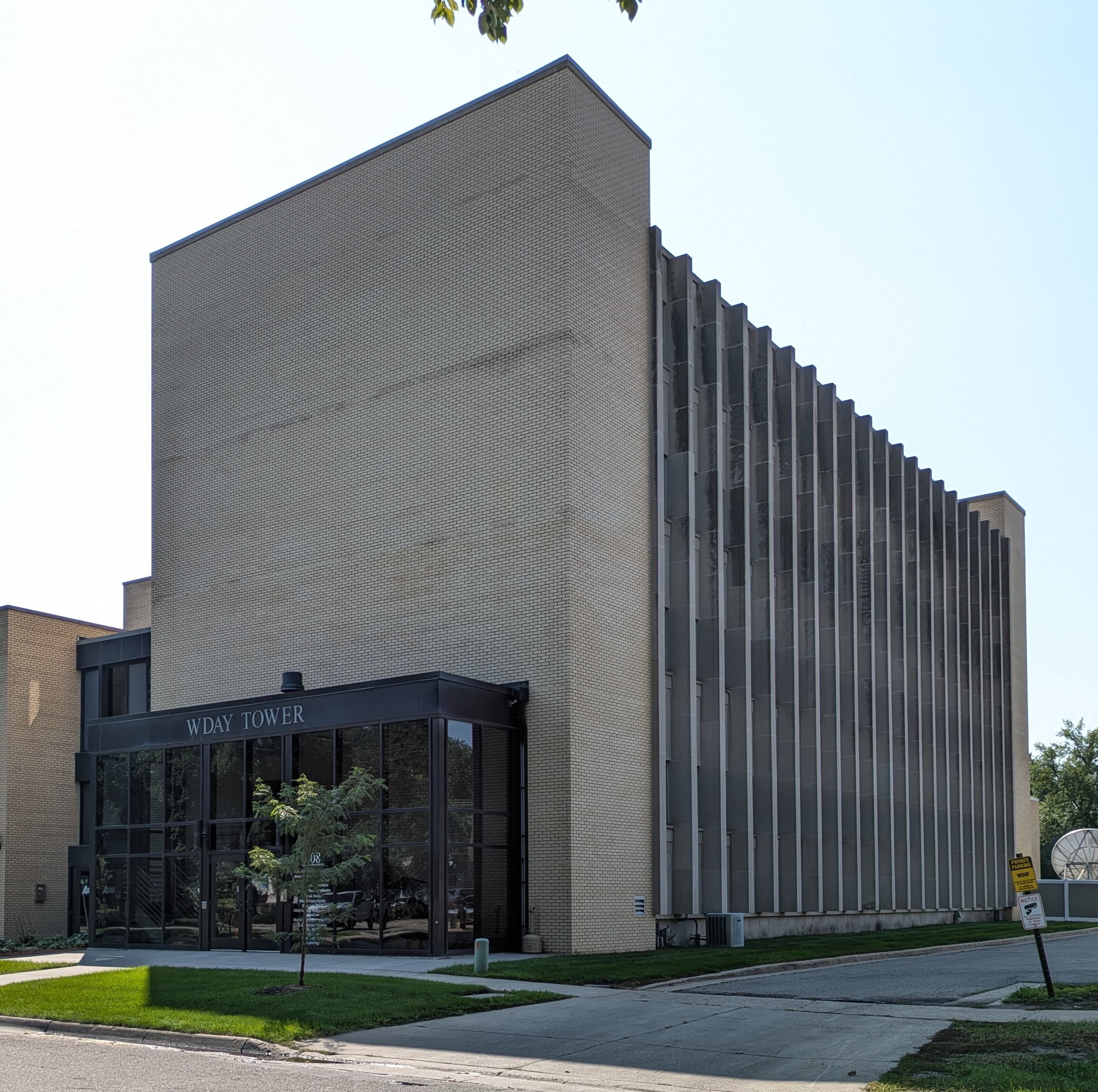
WDAY Tower in Fargo

WDAY features local talk shows weekdays hosted by Bonnie Amistadi, Jace Denman, Steve Hallstrom, Ronnie Lee, Janae White, and Jay Thomas, as well as local news and weather updates and national news updates from ABC News Radio. WDAY radio also airs newscasts simulcast from Valley News Live. Until 2025, it simulcast newscasts from WDAY-TV everyday, featured live sports play-by-play, and nationally syndicated programming. Shows include Markley, Van Camp, and Robbins, Ben Shapiro, Red Eye Radio, Kim Komando, Gary Sullivan and Leo Laporte. From 1953 to 2025, through its co-ownership with WDAY-TV, the radio station had the capability to simulcast on WDAY-TV in the event of an emergency during WDAY-TV's typical off air hours. This occurred in 2009 during the Red River floods. This ended when the previous owner, Forum Communications Company, sold the station.

== History ==
Effective December 1, 1921, the Department of Commerce, which regulated radio at this time, adopted regulations setting aside two wavelengths for use by broadcasting stations: 360 meters (833 kHz) for "entertainment" programs, and 485 meters (619 kHz) for "market and weather" reports. On May 23, 1922, WDAY's first license, as North Dakota's first radio station, was issued to Kenneth M. Hance at 117 Broadway in Fargo for operation on both wavelengths; on June 14, it started broadcasting weather reports. The station would later start its broadcasts on Mondays and Thursdays, effective August 17, 1922.

The WDAY call sign was randomly assigned from a sequential list of available call letters. Currently most stations west of the Mississippi River have call letters beginning with "K". However, WDAY was licensed before the government changed the dividing line between W and K call signs. Prior to the January 1923 establishment of the Mississippi River as the boundary, call letters beginning with "W" were generally assigned to stations east of an irregular line formed by the western state borders from North Dakota south to Texas, with calls beginning with "K" going only to stations in states west of that line.

In July, WDAY's schedule on 360 meters was reported to be musical programs on Monday, Wednesday and Friday plus baseball scores and general news daily at 7:30 p.m. except Sunday, and, on 485 meters, weather reports daily at 7:30 p.m., both by voice and by Morse Code. In 1923 ownership was changed to Fargo Radio Service (Kenneth N. Hance), which later became the Radio Equipment Corporation.

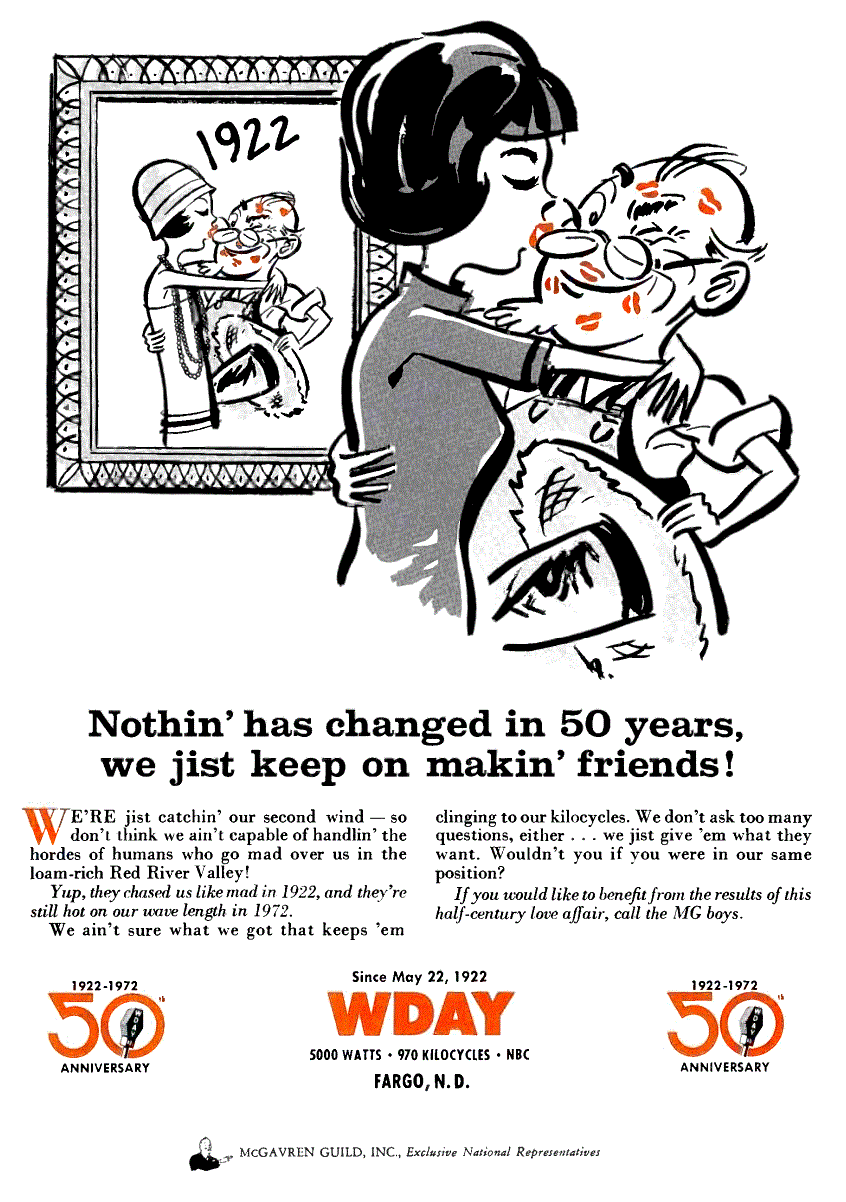
WDAY celebrated its 50th anniversary on May 22, 1972.

On November 11, 1928, under the provisions of the Federal Radio Commission's General Order 40, WDAY was assigned to 1280 kHz on a timeshare basis with WEBC, then in Superior, Wisconsin. The next year WDAY moved to 940 kHz, now with unlimited hours of operation. On January 8, 1935, the U.S. Federal Communications Commission (FCC) approved increasing WDAY's power to 5,000 watts. The Fargo Forum newspaper obtained a minority interest in the station in 1935, and gained controlling interest of WDAY and WDAY-TV in 1960. On March 29, 1941, stations on 940 kHz moved to 970 kHz, with the implementation of the North American Regional Broadcasting Agreement.

On May 30, 2011, a severe thunderstorm badly damaged WDAY's radio towers located on Main Avenue in West Fargo, North Dakota, knocking the station off the air. Of the three towers, one completely collapsed, a second snapped approximately two-thirds of the way up, and the third remained standing but severely mangled. WDAY was able to get back on the air several days later using the remaining tower, with the full 5,000 watt non-directional signal during the day, but only 1,200 watts at night, as the two towers which were lost were used for the directional 5,000 watt nighttime signal. The FCC granted WDAY a construction permit to make it a 10,000 watt full-time signal from a new transmitter, which began broadcasting at full power in March 2013.

An FM translator at 93.1 FM signed on the air Thursday, July 20, 2017.

In 2020, Forum Communications Company entered into a local marketing agreement with Bakken Beacon Media, giving Flag Family Media full programming control of AM 970 and 93.1 FM. Flag Family Media bought full control of WDAY radio in 2025.

== See also ==
- Black Building (Fargo, North Dakota): originally built to hold the studios
- WDAY-TV
- WDAZ-TV
- The Forum of Fargo-Moorhead
- List of initial AM-band station grants in the United States
