= KFJM =

Grand Forks, North Dakota; United States
- Frequency: 90.7 MHz
- Branding: Prairie Public Radio

Programming
- Format: College/Public; Adult album alternative
- Affiliations: Prairie Public Radio, NPR

Ownership
- Owner: Prairie Public Radio; (Prairie Public Broadcasting, Inc.)
- Sister stations: KUND-FM

History
- First air date: March 6, 1995
- Former call signs: KFJY (1995–1997)

Technical information
- Facility ID: 69406
- Class: A
- ERP: 4,000 watts
- HAAT: 34 meters
- Transmitter coordinates: 47.905°N 97.115°W

Links
- Webcast: Listen Live
- Website: www.prairiepublic.org

KFJM (90.7 FM) is a public radio station in Grand Forks, North Dakota airing an adult album alternative format with news in the mornings, jazz in the late evenings and blues and folk on the weekends. It carries programs from NPR and Public Radio International. KFJM shares its coverage area with Minnesota Public Radio outlets KNTN and KQMN, both licensed to Thief River Falls, Minnesota. This makes Grand Forks one of the smallest markets with competing NPR stations.

== History ==
=== KFJY ===
KFJM signed on March 6, 1995, as KFJY on 90.7 MHz. It was the University of North Dakota's third radio station, joining the original KFJM, an AM station dating back to 1923, and KFJM-FM on 89.3 MHz, which had been established in 1976. KFJY simulcast KFJM with an adult album alternative (AAA) format and jazz overnight. During April 1997, both stations went off the air as the floodwaters went through the transmitter site.

=== KFJM ===
On August 15, 1997, all three University of North Dakota stations changed call signs. KFJY inherited the historic KFJM call letters, while the original KFJM became KUND and KFJM-FM on 89.3 MHz became KUND-FM.

On July 31, 2002, KUND and KFJM went off the air due to shortages from public funding, although KUND-FM continued to be operated by Prairie Public Radio. The stations signed back on on August 6, 2002 with its AAA format featuring the long running "Into the Music with Mike Olson" along with NPR's The World Cafe with David Dye, American Routes, and Morning Edition from NPR.

KUND was sold to Real Presence Radio, a Roman Catholic organization, in 2004, which changed that station's call letters to KWTL. The sale financed a transmitter move for KFJM from the University of North Dakota campus to a tower located in the Grand Forks industrial park, which was completed on August 22, 2006.

In 2006, KDSU 91.9 FM in Fargo began simulcasting some of KFJM's programming, including "Into the Music with Mike Olson" and The World Cafe with David Dye during the midday. KPPR 89.5 FM of Williston was added to the network in 2011 as Prairie Public moved the news and classical programming to new station KPPW 88.7.

In September 2018, KFJM, along with KUND-FM, was sold by the University of North Dakota to Prairie Public Radio.
