= Prairie Public =

Community-owned public broadcaster based in North Dakota

Prairie Public Broadcasting is a community-owned public broadcaster based in North Dakota, with television coverage extending into South Dakota, Montana, northwestern Minnesota, and Manitoba, and radio service to North Dakota and online to the world. It operates a radio network and a television network.
