= List of radio stations in Sonora =

This is a list of CRT-licensed radio stations in the state of Sonora, Mexico, which can be sorted by their call signs, frequencies, location, ownership, names, and programming formats.

Frequency	Call sign	Location	Name	Format	Operator
730 kHz	XESOS-AM	Agua Prieta (El Sifón)	La Ranchera (Note: Linked to XHSOS-FM, which must keep XESOS-AM on the air until there are no listeners in its service area unserved by other radio stations.)	Regional Mexican	Arnoldo Rodríguez Zermeño
92.7 MHz	XHAGP-FM	Agua Prieta	Radio Alcance, La Poderosa	Christian	María de Lourdes Robeson Chávez
97.3 MHz	XHSOS-FM	Agua Prieta	La Ranchera	Regional Mexican	Arnoldo Rodríguez Zermeño
98.5 MHz	XHSAP-FM	Agua Prieta	La Tremenda	Regional Mexican	Arnoldo Rodríguez Zermeño
99.9 MHz	XHNNO-FM	Naco	Los 40	Top 40 (CHR)	Arnoldo Rodríguez Zermeño
101.3 MHz	XHAPS-FM	Agua Prieta	Radio Sonora	Public radio	Government of the State of Sonora
106.9 MHz	XHAQ-FM	Agua Prieta	Radio Mundo	Instrumental	Radio Internacional del Comercio
107.9 MHz	XHFH-FM	Agua Prieta	Radio Plan	Grupera	Héctor Rivera Esquer
94.7 MHz	XHCPEE-FM	Álamos	Radio Sonora	Public radio	Government of the State of Sonora
94.7 MHz	XHZPE-FM	Arizpe	Radio Sonora	Public radio	Government of the State of Sonora
101.1 MHz	XHRFS-FM	Bacadéhuachi			Grupo Radio Fiesta Sierreña, A.C.
101.1 MHz	XHRFB-FM	Bacerac			Grupo Radio Fiesta Sierreña, A.C.
90.1 MHz	XHHIL-FM	Benjamín Hill	Radio Sonora	Public radio	Government of the State of Sonora
93.3 MHz	XHSCA-FM	Cananea	La Consentida	Romantic	Multifrontera's S.A. de C.V.
97.7 MHz	XHSEA-FM	Cananea	Radio Sonora	Public radio	Government of the State of Sonora
102.3 MHz	XHTSC-FM	Cananea	Radio Tecnológico	Public radio	Instituto Tecnológico Superior de Cananea
103.1 MHz	XHFQ-FM	Cananea	La FQ	Public radio	Instituto Mexicano de la Radio
104.7 MHz	XHCNE-FM	Cananea	La Poderosa		Radio Cananea, S.A. de C.V.
107.3 MHz	XHSCAG-FM	Cananea	Oro Radio	Community radio	Cananea Alternativa, A.C.
94.7 MHz	XHRBO-FM	Carbó	Radio Sonora	Public radio	Government of the State of Sonora
760 kHz	XEEB-AM	Ciudad Obregón	La Zeta (Note: Linked to XHEB-FM, which must keep XEEB-AM on the air until there are no listeners in its service area unserved by other radio stations.)		Difusión Radiofónica de Ciudad Obregón, S.A.
810 kHz	XERSV-AM	Ciudad Obregón	Tribuna Radio		Empresas Editoriales del Noroeste, S.A. de C.V.
90.5 MHz	XHFL-FM	Ciudad Obregón	La Invasora		Radio Difusora XHFL, S.A. de C.V.
92.1 MHz	XHOBS-FM	Ciudad Obregón	Con Madre		XEOBS-AM, S.A. de C.V.
92.9 MHz	XHGON-FM	Ciudad Obregón	La Kaliente	Regional Mexican	Carlos de Jesús Quiñones Armendáriz
94.7 MHz	XHCDO-FM	Ciudad Obregón	Radio Sonora	Public radio	Government of the State of Sonora
95.3 MHz	XHCOB-FM	Ciudad Obregón			Fundación Cultural para la Sociedad Mexicana
95.7 MHz	XHCSGJ-FM	El Álamo (Ciudad Obregón)	B-FM		Aligerare, A.C.
96.9 MHz	XHAP-FM	Ciudad Obregón	La Número Uno		X.E.A.P., S.A. de C.V.
97.7 MHz	XHHO-FM	Ciudad Obregón	Máxima		XEHO de Obregón, S.A. de C.V.
98.5 MHz	XHEB-FM	Ciudad Obregón	Zeta		Difusión Radiofónica de Ciudad Obregón, S.A.
99.3 MHz	XHOX-FM	Ciudad Obregón	Exa FM		Radio Cajeme, S.A.
100.1 MHz	XHCSAE-FM	Ciudad Obregón	Radio Vida		Francisco Elmer Santacruz Germán
100.9 MHz	XHSM-FM	Ciudad Obregón	La Poderosa	Grupera	XHSM-FM, S.A. de C.V.
101.7 MHz	XHHX-FM	Ciudad Obregón	La Mia		XEHX, S.A. de C.V.
102.5 MHz	XHIQ-FM	Ciudad Obregón	Oreja 102.5 FM		Ingenio Radiofónico, S.A. de C.V.
103.3 MHz	XHVJS-FM	Villa Juárez–Ciudad Obregón	La Mejor		Luis Felipe García de León Martínez
104.9 MHz	XHESO-FM	Ciudad Obregón	Studio		XESO-AM, S.A. de C.V.
105.7 MHz	XHOS-FM	Ciudad Obregón	La Única		Organización Sonora, S.A. de C.V.
101.1 MHz	XHRFD-FM	Divisaderos			Grupo Radio Fiesta Sierreña, A.C.
700 kHz	XEETCH-AM	Etchojoa	La Voz de los Tres Ríos		National Institute of Indigenous Peoples
94.7 MHz	XHGRA-FM	Granados	Radio Sonora	Public radio	Government of the State of Sonora
630 kHz	XEFX-AM	Guaymas	Amor 101.3 (Note: Linked to XHFX-FM, which must keep XEFX-AM on the air until there are no listeners in its service area unserved by other radio stations.)		Radio Sonora, S.A.
1240 kHz	XEBQ-AM	Guaymas	FM 105 + 105.3 FM		Gilhaam, S.A. de C.V.
88.3 MHz	XHCSGL-FM	San Carlos Nuevo Guaymas	La Número Uno		Aligerare, A.C.
90.1 MHz	XHGYS-FM	Guaymas	La Que Manda		XEGYS, S.A. de C.V.
90.9 MHz	XHPUAY-FM	Guaymas	Pop Extremo		Medios y Editorial de Sonora, S.A. de C.V.
91.7 MHz	XHCSEG-FM	Guaymas	NRGY FM		Radio Agricultores Del Valle De Sinaloa, A.C
93.3 MHz	XHPGYM-FM	Guaymas	Red 93.3		Sonora Emedios, S.A. de C.V.
94.7 MHz	XHGUA-FM	Guaymas	Radio Sonora		Government of the State of Sonora
99.5 MHz	XHDR-FM	Guaymas	La Patrona		Claudia Elena Lizárraga Verdugo
100.5 MHz	XHPMAS-FM	Guaymas	Sonora Grupera		Medios y Editorial de Sonora, S.A. de C.V.
101.3 MHz	XHFX-FM	Guaymas	Amor 101.3		Radio Sonora, S.A.
102.1 MHz	XHEPS-FM	Guaymas	La Súper Grupera		Radio Amistad de Sonora, S.A. de C.V.
103.7 MHz	XHGYM-FM	Guaymas			Organiden, A.C.
105.3 MHz	XHBQ-FM	Guaymas	FM 105		Gilhaam, S.A. de C.V.
650 kHz	XEHEEP-AM	Hermosillo	Acustik Radio		Escápate al Paraíso, S.A. de C.V.
88.1 MHz	XHRMO-FM	Hermosillo	La Voz del Pitic	Variety	Democracia y Deliberación Desértica, A.C.
88.5 MHz	XHCCCK-FM	Hermosillo			Irratia, S.A.P.I. de C.V.
88.9 MHz	XHESON-FM	Hermosillo	La Poderosa		Radiodifusora de Hermosillo, S.A. de C.V.
89.7 MHz	XHEDL-FM	Hermosillo	Radio Activa		Carlos de Jesús Quiñones Armendáriz
90.7 MHz	XHHLL-FM	Hermosillo	La Kaliente		GIM Televisión Nacional, S.A. de C.V.
91.5 MHz	XHYF-FM	Hermosillo	Radio Fórmula	News/talk	Transmisora Regional Radio Fórmula, S.A. de C.V.
92.3 MHz	XHUSS-FM	Hermosillo	Suave		Radio XHUSS Hermosillo, S.A. de C.V.
93.1 MHz	XHEPB-FM	Hermosillo	Love	Romantic	Carlos de Jesús Quiñones Armendáriz
93.9 MHz	XHMV-FM	Hermosillo	Toño		XHMV-FM, S.A. de C.V.
94.7 MHz	XHHB-FM	Hermosillo	Radio Sonora	Public radio	Government of the State of Sonora
95.5 MHz	XHCD-FM	Hermosillo	Zoom 95	Community radio	Comunicadores del Desierto, A.C.
96.3 MHz	XHVS-FM	Hermosillo	Máxima	Contemporary hit radio	Carlos de Jesús Quiñones Armendáriz
97.1 MHz	XHHQ-FM	Hermosillo	Los Número 1	Regional Mexican	CRNM Corporativo Radiofónico del Noroeste de México, S.A. de C.V.
98.5 MHz	XHBH-FM	Hermosillo	La Mejor	Grupera	Stereorey México, S.A.
99.5 MHz	XHFEM-FM	Hermosillo	BFM Best Pop	Contemporary hit radio	Radio XHFEM, S.A. de C.V.
99.9 MHz	XHCCCL-FM	Hermosillo	—N/a		Irratia, S.A.P.I. de C.V.
100.3 MHz	XHSD-FM	Hermosillo	Stereo 100		Radiodifusora XHSD, S.A. de C.V.
100.7 MHz	XHSCMF-FM	Hermosillo	Radio Son-Horas Alternativas, A.C.	Manzana Radio	Community radio
101.1 MHz	XHVSS-FM	Hermosillo	Arroba FM	Pop	La Súper de Hermosillo, S.A. de C.V.
101.9 MHz	XHHOS-FM	Hermosillo (La Paloma)	La Invasora		Radiodifusora XEHOS, S.A. de C.V.
102.7 MHz	XHDM-FM	Hermosillo	La Zeta 102.7		Radio XHDM, S. de R.L. de C.V.
103.5 MHz	XHRMO-FM	Hermosillo	Lobos FM	University radio	Fomento Educativo y Cultural Francisco de Ibarra, A.C.
104.7 MHz	XHCSCH-FM	Hermosillo	Sol 104.7 FM		Preparatoria Educativa Pirámide del Sol, S.C.
105.1 MHz	XHMMO-FM	Hermosillo	La Raza	Regional Mexican	Comunicaciones Alrey, S.A. de C.V.
105.9 MHz	XHHER-FM	Hermosillo	Click FM		Organiden, A.C.
106.7 MHz	XHSILL-FM	Hermosillo	Política y Rock'n'roll Radio	Community radio	Autogestión Comunicativa, A.C.
107.5 MHz	XHUSH-FM	Hermosillo	Radio Universidad	University radio	Universidad de Sonora
570 kHz	XEUK-AM	Caborca	La UK (Note: Linked to XHUK-FM, which must keep XEUK-AM on the air until there are no listeners in its service area unserved by other radio stations.)		Radio Palacios, S.A. de C.V.
89.9 MHz	XHIB-FM	Caborca	La Que Manda		XEIB-AM, S.A. de C.V.
90.7 MHz	XHEZ-FM	Caborca	La Gran Z		Radio Palacios, S.A. de C.V.
91.5 MHz	XHSOA-FM	Caborca	Radio Sonora	Public radio	Government of the State of Sonora
94.5 MHz	XHCAB-FM	Caborca	Radio Universidad	University radio	Universidad de Sonora
95.3 MHz	XHUK-FM	Caborca	La UK		Radio Palacios, S.A. de C.V.
100.1 MHz	XHCBR-FM	Caborca	Max 100		Radio Palacios, S.A. de C.V.
760 kHz	XENY-AM	Nogales	Radio XENY	Vatiety	Sucesión de Ramón Guzmán Rivera
89.1 MHz	XHEHF-FM	Nogales	Radio Fórmula		Transmisora Regional Radio Fórmula, S.A. de C.V.
89.5 MHz	XHCG-FM	Nogales	La Poderosa		Radio Nogales, S.A. de C.V.
89.9 MHz	XHHN-FM	Nogales	Studio	Classic Hits	XEHN, S.A. de C.V.
90.3 MHz	XHXW-FM	Nogales	KY	Urban	Radio 13, S.A.
96.7 MHz	XHNGS-FM	Nogales	La Mejor	Grupera	Stereorey México, S.A.
102.7 MHz	XHQT-FM	Nogales	Exa FM		Stereorey México, S.A.
103.5 MHz	XHRZ-FM	Nogales	La Bestia Grupera	Grupera	XHRZ-FM, S.A. de C.V.
104.3 MHz	XHAZE-FM	Nogales	Urbana 104.3	Spanish Rhythmic	Gusar Telecomunicaciones, S.A. de C.V.
105.1 MHz	XHNI-FM	Nogales	Stereo Genial	Regional Mexican	María del Carmen Guzmán Muñoz
105.9 MHz	XHNES-FM	Nogales	Radio Sonora	Public radio	Government of the State of Sonora
106.7 MHz	XHSN-FM	Nogales	La Número Uno	Regional Mexican	XHSN-FM, S.A. de C.V.
92.5 MHz	XHSIBG-FM	Huatabampo (Júpare)	Sisigok Yorem Jiawi'	Indigenous radio	Comunidad Indígena Yoreme, Asentada en Júpare
102.1 MHz	XHYO-FM	Huatabampo	Radio Lobo		Manuel Oswaldo Alvarado Quintero
94.7 MHz	XHMUR-FM	Ímuris	Radio Sonora	Public radio	Government of the State of Sonora
90.7 MHz	XHLDC-FM	Magdalena de Kino	KY	Urban	Radio XHLDC Sonora, S.A. de C.V.
95.5 MHz	XHCPEG-FM	Magdalena de Kino	Radio Sonora	Public radio	Government of the State of Sonora
103.1 MHz	XHMAN-FM	Miguel Alemán	Radio Sonora	Public radio	Government of the State of Sonora
94.7 MHz	XHMOC-FM	Moctezuma	Radio Sonora	Public radio	Government of the State of Sonora
101.5 MHz	XHRFM-FM	Moctezuma	Radio Fiesta		Grupo Radio Fiesta Sierreña, A.C.
94.7 MHz	XHCHI-FM	Nácori Chico	Radio Sonora	Public radio	Government of the State of Sonora
99.1 MHz	XHNZI-FM	Nacozari de García	Toño		Claudia Elena Lizárraga Verdugo
105.5 MHz	XHARI-FM	Nacozari de García	Radio Sonora	Public radio	Government of the State of Sonora
1270 kHz	XEGL-AM	Navojoa	La Verdad Radio	Variety	Renovando la Comunicacion, S.A. de C.V.
88.9 MHz	XHENS-FM	Navojoa	Z 88.9	Spanish Classic Hits	Promotora Radiovisión, S.A. de C.V.
89.7 MHz	XHPNAV-FM	Navojoa	Sonora Grupera	Regional Mexican	Medios y Editorial de Sonora, S.A. de C.V.
93.7 MHz	XHNVS-FM	Navojoa	Radio Universidad	University radio	Universidad de Sonora
94.7 MHz	XHNAV-FM	Navojoa	Radio Sonora	Public radio	Government of the State of Sonora
95.5 MHz	XHNAS-FM	Navojoa	KY	Urban	Grupo Audiorama Comunicaciones
98.1 MHz	XHPJOA-FM	Navojoa	Pop Extremo	Pop	Medios y Editorial de Sonora, S.A. de C.V.
104.5 MHz	XHKE-FM	Navojoa	KE 104.5 FM	Regional Mexican	Promotora Unimedios, S.A. de C.V.
93.5 MHz	XHPPO-FM	Puerto Peñasco	La Bestia Gurpera	Grupera	XHPPO, S.A. de C.V.
105.3 MHz	XHPPU-FM	Puerto Peñasco	Radio Sonora	Public radio	Government of the State of Sonora
94.7 MHz	XHIPA-FM	Sahuaripa	Radio Sonora	Public radio	Government of the State of Sonora
92.3 MHz	XHPEDW-FM	Sahuaripa (Bámori)	El Gato	Regional Mexican	Apoyamos tu Superación, A.C.
102.3 MHz	XHCPEH-FM	San Felipe de Jesús	Radio Sonora	Public radio	Government of the State of Sonora
1460 kHz	XECB-AM	San Luis Río Colorado	Radio Ranchito (Note: Simulcast of XHDY-FM, a regional station nominally based in Ciudad Morelos, Baja California)	Regional Mexican	Radio Impulsora de San Luis, S.A. de C.V.
1520 kHz	XEEH-AM	San Luis Río Colorado	La Primera	Variety	Sucesión de Francisco Encinas Angulo
88.5 MHz	XHCRS-FM	San Luis Río Colorado	Radio Sonora	Public radio	Government of the State of Sonora
89.5 MHz	XHRCL-FM	San Luis Río Colorado	Variedades FM	Variety	Radio Rocola, S.A. de C.V.
91.1 MHz	XHEMW-FM	San Luis Río Colorado	Río Digital	Variety hits	Radio Impulsora de San Luis, S.A. de C.V.
93.9 MHz	XHLBL-FM	San Luis Río Colorado	Radio Centro	Adult hits	Radio Impulsora de San Luis, S.A. de C.V.
102.5 MHz	XHLPS-FM	San Luis Río Colorado	Fuerza Latina	Grupera	XHLPS, FM, S.A. de C.V.
107.9 MHz	XHSLR-FM	San Luis Río Colorado	La Consentida	Grupera	Radio y Televisión Internacional, S.A. de C.V.
94.7 MHz	XHSPD-FM	San Pedro de la Cueva	Radio Sonora	Public radio	Government of the State of Sonora
89.1 MHz	XHNTA-FM	Santa Ana	Radio Universidad	University radio	Universidad de Sonora
94.7 MHz	XHSTN-FM	Santa Ana	Radio Sonora	Public radio	Government of the State of Sonora
98.7 MHz	XHAB-FM	Santa Ana	La Raza + 1400 AM		Carlos de Jesús Quiñones Armendáriz
88.9 MHz	XHSSA-FM	Sonoyta	Radio Sonora	Public radio	Government of the State of Sonora
96.5 MHz	XHITA-FM	Sonoyta	Super	Pop	Arnoldo Rodríguez Zermeño
99.3 MHz	XHMZQ-FM	Tepache	Radio Sonora	Public radio	Government of the State of Sonora
1010 kHz	XEXN-AM	Ures	Radio Ures		
92.9 MHz	XHCSGK-FM	Ures	La Número Uno		Aligerare, A.C.
103.9 MHz	XHURS-FM	Ures	Radio Sonora	Public radio	Government of the State of Sonora
89.3 MHz	XHCPCT-FM	Vícam	La Voz del Río Yaqui	Indigenous radio	National Institute of Indigenous Peoples
107.9 MHz	XHSIBH-FM	Vícam		Indigenous radio	Comunidad Indígena Yaqui, Asentada en Vicam
94.7 MHz	XHYEC-FM	Yécora	Radio Sonora	Public radio	Government of the State of Sonora

== Defunct ==
- XEDJ-AM 1450, Magdalena de Kino
- XEQC-AM 1390, Puerto Peñasco
- XHNOS-FM 97.5, Nogales
