= Arizona Diamondbacks Radio Networks =

US radio networks

The Arizona Diamondbacks Radio Networks are 2 radio networks, of 24 total stations with 2 F.M. translators, carrying games of the Arizona Diamondbacks. There is an English-language network consisting of 20 stations and a Spanish-language network of five stations, including four in Mexico. The English-language network originates at KTAR/620 and KMVP-FM/98.7 in Phoenix, Arizona, while the Spanish-language network originates at KHOV-FM/105.1 serving Phoenix. The main play-by-play announcer on the English-language network is Chris Garagiola. The color analyst is former major-leaguer Tom Candiotti. The games' pre- & post-game host is Jeff Munn who also fills in on play-by-play. On the Spanish-language network, the play-by-play announcer is Oscar Soria and the color analyst is Miguel Quintana. Arturo Ochoa is the fill-in Spanish play-by-play announcer, and the fill-in color analyst is Richard Saenz.

== Station list ==
=== Flagships ===
| Callsign | Frequency | Location |
|---|---|---|
| KTAR (AM) | 620 AM | Phoenix |
| KMVP-FM | 98.7 FM | Phoenix |
| KHOV-FM | 105.1 FM | Wickenburg/Phoenix |

==== United States ====
===== Arizona =====
| Callsign | Frequency | Location |
|---|---|---|
| KDDL | 94.3 FM | Chino Valley |
| KVNA | 600 AM | Flagstaff |
| KZUA | 92.1 FM | Holbrook |
| KNTR | 980 AM | Lake Havasu City |
| K232EI | 94.3 FM | Lake Havasu City |
| K263BM | 100.5 FM | Bullhead City |
| KIKO | 1340 AM | Miami (Globe area) |
| KQNA | 1130 AM | Prescott Valley |
| K260BL | 99.9 FM | Prescott |
| KATO | 1230 AM | Safford |
| KAZM | 780 AM | Sedona |
| KZKE | 103.3 FM | Seligman |
| K236BH | 95.1 FM | Kingman |
| KNKI | 106.7 FM | Show Low |
| KRVZ | 1400 AM | Springerville |
| KFFN | 1490 AM | Tucson |
| K285DL | 104.9 FM | Tucson |
| KINO | 1230 AM | Winslow |
| KCYK | 1400 AM | Yuma |

===== New Mexico =====
| Callsign | Frequency | Location |
|---|---|---|
| KNMZ | 103.7 FM | Alamogordo |

==== Mexico ====
All four Mexican affiliates are in the state of Sonora and owned by Grupo Larsa Comunicaciones.

| Callsign | Frequency | Location |
|---|---|---|
| XHCNE-FM | 104.7 FM | Cananea (2014-) |
| XHVSS-FM | 101.1 FM | Hermosillo (2014-) |
| XEHN-AM | 1130 AM | Nogales (2014-) |
| XHIQ-FM | 102.5 FM | Obregon (2014-) |

==== Unsure status ====
| Callsign | Frequency | Location |
|---|---|---|
| KZUZ | 93.5 FM | Show Low (simulcasts KZUA but not listed as the affiliate of record for Show Low). |

=== Former flagships ===
| Callsign | Frequency | Location |
|---|---|---|
| KBMB | 710 AM | Black Canyon City (????-2013) |
| KSUN | 1400 AM | Phoenix (2014-2016) |

=== Former affiliates ===
| Callsign | Frequency | Location |
|---|---|---|
| KHIL | 1250 AM | Willcox |
| XEHOS-AM | 1540 AM | Hermosillo, Sonora, Mexico (????-2013) |
| XHITA-FM | 96.5 FM | Sonoita/Puerto Peñasco, Sonora, Mexico (????-????) |
| XHLDC-FM | 90.7 FM | Magdalena, Sonora, Mexico (2014-2016) |

Notes:

- Spanish-language stations are listed in italics.
- Translators are listed smaller than full-power stations.
