= XHAB =

XHAB may refer to:

- XHAB-FM, a radio station (98.7 FM) in Santa Ana, Sonora, Mexico
- XHAB-TDT, a television station (channel 30, virtual 8) in Matamoros, Tamaulipas, Mexico
