= 1010 AM =

AM radio frequency

The following radio stations broadcast on AM frequency 1010 kHz: 1010 AM is a Canadian clear-channel frequency. CFRB Toronto and CBR Calgary are both Class A, 50,000 watt stations.

== In Argentina ==
- LV16 Rio Cuarto in Rio Cuarto, Córdoba
- Onda Latina in Buenos Aires

== In Canada ==
Stations in bold are clear-channel stations.

Call sign	City of license	Daytime power (kW)	Nighttime power (kW)	Transmitter coordinates
**CBR**	Calgary, Alberta	50	50	50.938056°N 113.961667°W
**CFRB**	Toronto, Ontario	50	50	43.505611°N 79.630712°W

== In Cuba ==
- Radio Mil Diez, defunct

== In Mexico ==
- XEHGO-AM in Huejutla de Reyes, Hidalgo
- XEHL-AM in San Juan de Ocotán, Jalisco
- XEPA-AM in Puebla, Puebla
- XEXN-AM in Ures, Sonora

== In the United States ==
Call sign	City of license	Facility ID	Class	Daytime power (kW)	Nighttime power (kW)	Critical hours power	Transmitter coordinates
KBBW	Waco, Texas	1322	B	10	2.5		31.568333°N 97.000278°W (daytime); 31.501944°N 96.965°W (nighttime)
KCHI	Chillicothe, Missouri	63377	D	0.25	0.037		39.764167°N 93.555833°W
KCHJ	Delano, California	35111	B	5	1		35.811111°N 119.321667°W
KDJW	Amarillo, Texas	31462	B	5	0.5		35.184167°N 101.691111°W
KIHU	Tooele, Utah	35687	D	50	0.194	42	40.720833°N 112.041389°W
KIND	Independence, Kansas	9799	D	0.25	0.032		37.261667°N 95.766389°W
KIQI	San Francisco, California	50703	B	10	10		37.826111°N 122.310278°W
KLAT	Houston, Texas	67063	B	5	3		29.896389°N 95.290278°W
KOOR	Milwaukie, Oregon	68212	D	4.5		1.1	45.484167°N 122.411111°W
KRNI	Mason City, Iowa	69035	D	0.76	0.016		43.141944°N 93.111111°W
KSIR	Brush, Colorado	48396	B	25	0.28		40.313889°N 103.591667°W
KXEN	St. Louis, Missouri	54739	D	0.16	0.014		38.762778°N 90.059722°W (daytime); 38.766944°N 90.058889°W (nighttime)
KXXT	Tolleson, Arizona	54742	B	23	0.3	9.8	33.445278°N 112.206389°W
WCKW	Garyville, Louisiana	115	D	0.5	0.042		30.076389°N 90.621389°W
WCNL	Newport, New Hampshire	35406	D	10	0.037		43.364444°N 72.179722°W
WCSI	Columbus, Indiana	72261	D	0.33	0.018		39.186667°N 85.95°W
WCST	Berkeley Springs, West Virginia	68205	D	0.27	0.017		39.616667°N 78.2175°W
WHIN	Gallatin, Tennessee	72178	D	5	0.047		36.433333°N 86.466667°W
WINS	New York, New York	25451	B	50	50		40.803889°N 74.106667°W
WIOI	New Boston, Ohio	60035	D	1	0.022		38.73°N 82.952778°W
WJBR	Seffner, Florida	28629	B	50	5		27.990278°N 82.251667°W
WJXL	Jacksonville Beach, Florida	63600	B	50	30		30.299167°N 82.007222°W
WKJW	Black Mountain, North Carolina	5972	D	47	0.09		35.591389°N 82.414722°W
WMIN	Sauk Rapids, Minnesota	161428	B	2.5	0.23		45.605°N 94.139167°W
WMOX	Meridian, Mississippi	7073	B	10	1		32.395°N 88.657778°W
WOLB	Baltimore, Maryland	54711	D	0.25	0.03		39.301667°N 76.569167°W
WORM	Savannah, Tennessee	24100	D	0.25	0.027		35.24°N 88.241389°W
WPCN	Stevens Point, Wisconsin	2106	D	1	0.01		44.538056°N 89.595278°W
WSPC	Albemarle, North Carolina	49041	D	1	0.064		35.386944°N 80.192222°W
WUKZ	Marion, Virginia	63710	D	1			36.856111°N 81.505°W
WWMC	Kinston, North Carolina	20408	D	1	0.078		35.284167°N 77.664722°W
WXKG	Atlanta, Georgia	72134	D	50	0.078	45	33.698611°N 84.289722°W

== In Uruguay ==
- CX 24 Nuevo Tiempo in Montevideo
