= KCKY =

Radio station in Coolidge, Arizona (1964–2024)

- Coolidge, Arizona; United States
- Frequency: 1150 kHz

Ownership
- Owner: Cortaro Broadcasting Corporation

History
- First air date: November 17, 1964
- Last air date: February 16, 2024

Technical information
- Facility ID: 48814
- Class: B
- Power: 5,000 watts (day); 1,000 watts (night)
- Transmitter coordinates: 33°0′27″N 111°32′54″W

Links
- Webcast: La Nueva Radio Kasa

KCKY (1150 AM) was a radio station licensed to Coolidge, Arizona, United States, and serving much of Pinal County. The station operated from 1964 until 2024 and was last owned by the Cortaro Broadcasting Corporation.

KCKY aired mostly Spanish language Christian programming, simulcasting with KSAZ in Tucson much of the time through a local marketing agreement with that station's owner.

== History ==
=== Original KCKY license ===
The first license for KCKY was issued in 1948 to the Gila Broadcasting Co., with the station going on air August 1. The station broadcast with 1,000 watts. KCKY was a KOOL radio affiliate, carrying Mutual Broadcasting System programs upon launch; on January 1, 1950, it switched with KOOL to CBS. Other programs carried over KCKY included, at various times, University of Arizona Wildcats football. On November 1, 1952, tragedy struck when the station's transmitter site burned down; the station was back on the air within two days and a new building was completed by the following April.

By the late 1950s, Gila owned five AM stations and one FM: KCKY, KCLF 1400 Clifton, KGLU 1480 Safford, KVNC 1010 Winslow, and KZOW 1240/KWJB-FM 100.3 Globe. Gila Broadcasting's undoing was accusations that a contract with a company called Radio Associates, owned by Gila Broadcasting managers, constituted a loss of control by the licensee. Additionally, the Federal Communications Commission (FCC) also contended that the Gila stations refused to join the CONELRAD civil defense system, charges denied by Gila's engineer who said that the systems were installed at great difficulty due to the remote locations of their facilities, and that inspectors found improperly maintained meters, missing logs, and gates that were not padlocked. At KCKY, the FCC claimed an unlicensed transmitter was in use.

On October 15, 1960, at a hearing in Phoenix, Gila asked the FCC to approve the renewal of the Gila stations' license and their sale to Earl Perrin, Jr., of Chicago. The stations went dark on October 29 despite the FCC denying Gila's request to take them silent, with Gila citing the fact that nervous employees fearing for their futures were already leaving their jobs and the company's financial state for the closures. In denying the request, the FCC warned that the affected communities had no other radio stations.

In August 1962, Arizona radio station owner Carleton W. Morris asked for FCC permission to set up new stations using the Gila facilities, having paid $100,000 for their equipment. The call letters were canceled on January 17, 1963.

=== Second KCKY license ===
The day before the FCC canceled the Gila chain's callsigns, on January 16, 1963, the Coolidge Broadcasting Corporation, owned by Craig and Kathleen Davids and Paul Dean Ford, applied to build a new station using KCKY's facilities. After reorganizing as the Pinal County Broadcasting System, the new KCKY signed on November 17, 1964, as an English-language country music station. Singers Lee Hazlewood and Waylon Jennings worked at KCKY briefly. Hazlewood hosted a weekly Saturday night show on the station which featured guitarist Duane Eddy and a house band.

In 1979, the station was sold to Grande Voz, Inc. Grande Voz filed to increase daytime power to 5,000 watts, which was approved in 1984. In its later years with Grande Voz, KCKY was the first all-sports station in Arizona, with affiliations with the Chicago Cubs and later Colorado Rockies radio networks as well as carriage of Phoenix Suns games and University of Nebraska Cornhuskers football. The sports format ended in late 1994 upon KCKY's sale to Nicamex, Inc., which converted it to a Spanish religious format. The station formed a trimulcast with KASA 1540 in Phoenix and KSAZ 580 in Tucson; 1540 later broke off to become its own, non-religious radio station.

KCKY's license was canceled on June 29, 2017, for not paying debts it owed to the FCC, which prevented the renewal of the station's license. The license was restored on November 8, 2017, after the FCC ruled that the cancellation was "premature"; concurrently, it initiated license revocation proceedings over the station not paying regulatory fees.

The FCC cancelled the station’s license again on February 16, 2024.
