= XHUSH-FM =

Radio station of the Universidad de Sonora

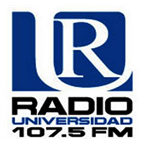
- Hermosillo, Sonora; Mexico
- Broadcast area: Sonora
- Frequency: 107.5 FM
- Branding: Radio Universidad

Programming
- Format: Cultural/university

Ownership
- Owner: Universidad de Sonora
- Sister stations: XHUS-TDT

History
- First air date: October 8, 1962 (AM); 2002 (FM)
- Former frequencies: 850 AM
- Call sign meaning: Universidad de Sonora Hermosillo

Technical information
- Licensing authority: CRT
- Class: B1
- ERP: 10 kW
- HAAT: 100 m (330 ft)

Links
- Webcast: 148.225.54.10/broadwavehigh.mp3
- Website: radio.uson.mx

XHUSH-FM is a radio station in Hermosillo, Sonora. It is owned by the Universidad de Sonora and broadcasts from its campus, with three repeaters in Caborca, Navojoa and Santa Ana.

== History ==
XEUS-AM 850 signed on October 8, 1962, as the first broadcasting station of the Universidad de Sonora. It was joined in 1963 by XEUDS on shortwave and in 1965 by a TV station, XHUS-TV channel 8.

In 2002, Radio Universidad expanded into a statewide network with the inauguration of four FM radio stations, including the new XHUSH-FM 107.5 in Hermosillo. The AM station was later discontinued, as was the shortwave service.

== Satellite stations ==
XHUSH has several satellite stations:

Call sign	Frequency	City of license	Class	ERP	HAAT
XHCAB-FM	94.5	Caborca	A	3 kW	26.5 m (87 ft)
XHNTA-FM	89.1	Santa Ana	A	3 kW	10.2 m (33 ft)
XHNVS-FM	93.7	Navojoa	2.83 kW		
