= XHSD-FM =

Two Mexican radio stations bear the XHSD-FM callsign:

- XHSD-FM (Guanajuato), 99.3 "@FM" in Silao/León, Guanajuato
- XHSD-FM (Sonora), 100.3 FM "Stereo 100.3" in Hermosillo, Sonora
