= Radio Sonora =

Public radio network of the Mexican state of Sonora

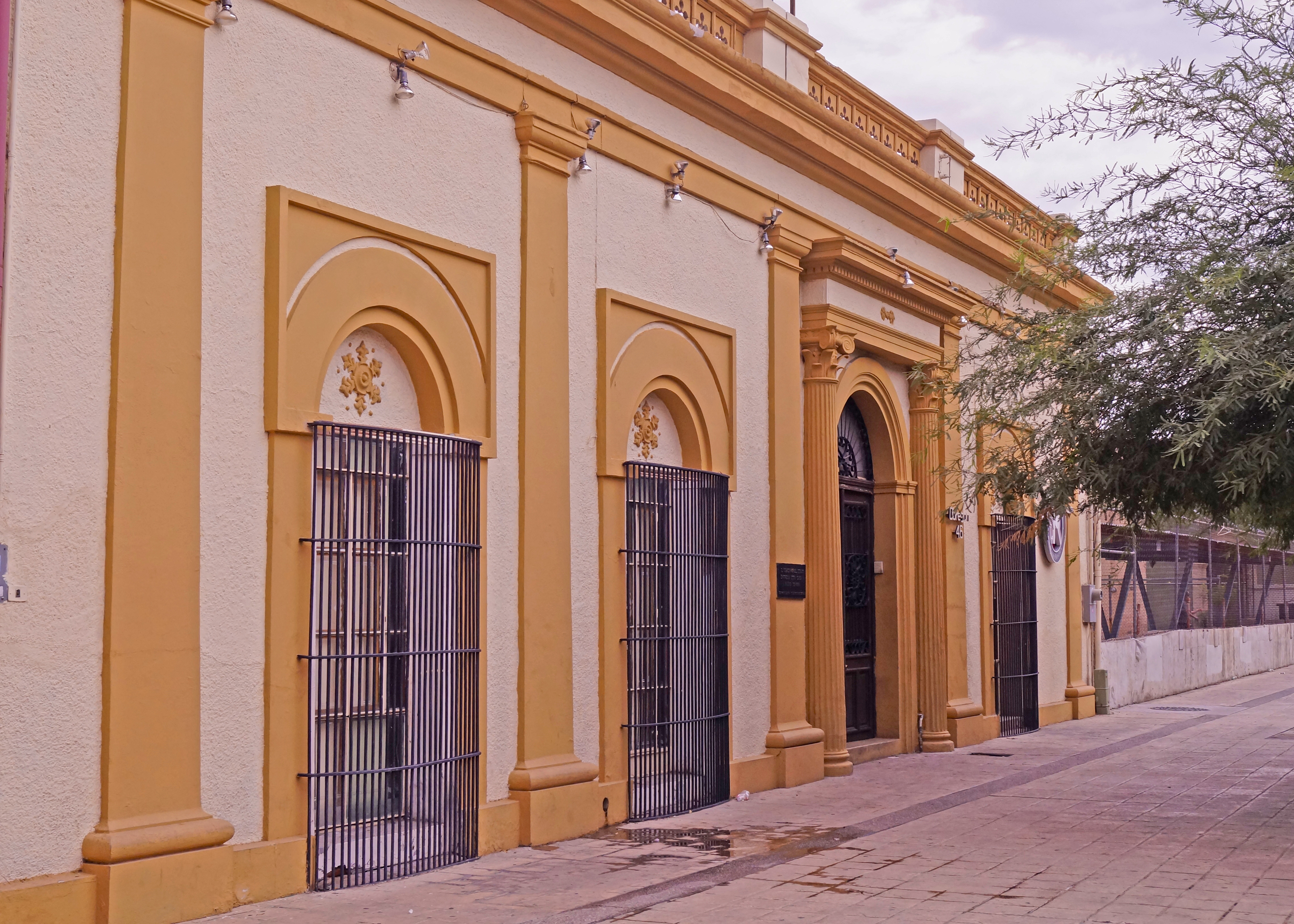
- Sonora; Mexico
- Broadcast area: Sonora
- Frequency: (see table)
- Branding: Radio Sonora

Programming
- Format: Public Radio

Ownership
- Owner: Government of the State of Sonora
- Sister stations: Telemax

Technical information
- Licensing authority: CRT
- Class: (see table)
- ERP: (see table)
- HAAT: (see table)

Links
- Webcast: Radio Sonora
- Website: www.radiosonora.com.mx

Radio Sonora is the state radio network of the Mexican state of Sonora. It serves 95% of the state through its 30 FM transmitters, making it the second-largest state radio network in Mexico.

It began operations during the government of Samuel Ocaña García (1979–85).

== Transmitters ==
The state of Sonora owns 30 radio transmitters, the second-most of any state in Mexico, to carry the Radio Sonora network. Bacerac and San Javier were added in September 2021.

Call sign	Frequency	City	Class	ERP	HAAT
XHAPS-FM	101.3 FM	Agua Prieta	A	1.538 kW	−7.57 m (−24.8 ft)
XHCPEE-FM	94.7 FM	Álamos	A	0.534 kW	−87 m (−285 ft)
XHZPE-FM	94.7 FM	Arizpe	A	0.59 kW	−227.7 m (−747 ft)
XHCPBQ-FM	104.5 FM	Bacerac	A	0.195 kW	−235 m (−771 ft)
XHHIL-FM	90.1 FM	Benjamin Hill	A	0.115 kW	1.2 m (3 ft 11 in)
XHSOA-FM	91.5 FM	Caborca	A	1.51 kW	23.5 m (77 ft)
XHSEA-FM	97.7 FM	Cananea	A	1.21 kW	66.6 m (219 ft)
XHRBO-FM	94.7 FM	Carbó	A	0.537 kW	−25.5 m (−84 ft)
XHCDO-FM	94.7 FM	Ciudad Obregón	B1	3.95 kW	162.4 m (533 ft)
XHGRA-FM	94.7 FM	Granados	A	0.59 kW	−331.2 m (−1,087 ft)
XHGUA-FM	94.7 FM	Guaymas	AA	0.36 kW	235.8 m (774 ft)
XHHB-FM (Note: Flagship station)	94.7 FM	Hermosillo	B	15.4 kW	216.8 m (711 ft)
XHMUR-FM	94.7 FM	Imuris	A	0.59 kW	−142.4 m (−467 ft)
XHCPEG-FM	95.5 FM	Magdalena de Kino	A	0.531 kW	−16 m (−52 ft)
XHMOC-FM	94.7 FM	Moctezuma	A	0.59 kW	−145.1 m (−476 ft)
XHCHI-FM	94.7 FM	Nácori Chico	A	0.59 kW	−215.5 m (−707 ft)
XHARI-FM	105.5 FM	Nacozari	A	0.045 kW	247.3 m (811 ft)
XHNAV-FM	94.7 FM	Navojoa	AA	0.5 kW	280.2 m (919 ft)
XHNES-FM	105.9 FM	Nogales	B1	0.6 kW	−35 m (−115 ft)
XHPPU-FM	105.3 FM	Puerto Peñasco	A	0.75 kW	32.4 m (106 ft)
XHIPA-FM	94.7 FM	Sahuaripa	A	0.59 kW	−183.4 m (−602 ft)
XHCPEH-FM	102.3 FM	San Felipe de Jesús	A	0.525 kW	200.5 m (658 ft)
XHCPBR-FM	99.7 FM	San Javier	A	0.195 kW	191.7 m (629 ft)
XHCRS-FM	88.5 FM	San Luis Río Colorado	A	0.400 kW	41.5 m (136 ft)
XHSPD-FM	94.7 FM	San Pedro de la Cueva	A	0.59 kW	−194.4 m (−638 ft)
XHSTN-FM	94.7 FM	Santa Ana	A	0.59 kW	−32.9 m (−108 ft)
XHSSA-FM	88.9 FM	Sonoyta	A	0.6 kW	−46.4 m (−152 ft)
XHMZQ-FM	99.3 FM	Tepache	D	0.046 kW	−53.8 m (−177 ft)
XHURS-FM	103.9 FM	Ures	A	0.59 kW	63.4 m (208 ft)
XHYEC-FM	94.7 FM	Yécora	A	0.59 kW	−75.1 m (−246 ft)
