= KVNC =

KVNC may refer to:

- Venice Municipal Airport (ICAO code KVNC)
- KVNC (FM), a radio station (90.9 FM) licensed to serve Minturn, Colorado, United States
- KVNC, a defunct radio station in Winslow, Arizona
