= XHAQ =

XHAQ may refer to:

- XHAQ-FM, a radio station (106.9 FM) in Agua Prieta, Sonora, Mexico
- XHAQ-TDT, a television station (channel 28, virtual 1) in Mexicali, Baja California, Mexico
