= XHMIX-FM =

Radio station in La Rumorosa, Baja California, Mexico

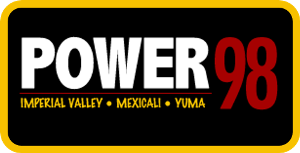
- La Rumorosa, Tecate Municipality, Baja California; Mexico
- Broadcast area: Imperial Valley, California; Yuma, Arizona/El Centro, California; Mexicali-San Luis Río Colorado
- Frequency: 98.3 MHz
- Branding: Power 98 Jams

Programming
- Language: English
- Format: Contemporary hit radio
- Affiliations: Grupo Radio Centro

Ownership
- Owner: California Medios; (Sistemas de Comunicación Bajacaliforniana, S.A. de C.V.)
- Sister stations: Radio Grupo OIR Sonora: XHEMW-FM, XHLBL-FM, XHLPS-FM, XHSLR-FM, XECB-AM, XHDY-FM, XHRCL-FM

History
- First air date: November 23, 1994
- Former call signs: XHRBN-FM (1994-August 5, 1996), XHFJ-FM (August 5, 1996-November 11, 2003)
- Call sign meaning: Station was known as Mix 98

Technical information
- Licensing authority: CRT
- Class: C1
- ERP: 50 kW
- HAAT: 381 m (1,250 ft)
- Transmitter coordinates: 32°33′11.35″N 116°01′42.3″W

Links
- Webcast: Listen live
- Website: power98jams.com

XHMIX-FM (98.3 FM) is an English-language commercial radio station located in La Rumorosa, Baja California, Mexico, broadcasting to Mexicali, Baja California and San Luis Río Colorado, Sonora in Mexico and the Imperial Valley, California and Yuma, Arizona in the United States. XHMIX airs a Contemporary hit radio music format branded as "Power 98 Jams".

== History ==
The 98.3 frequency in La Rumorosa, Baja California was put out for bid in 1992 as XHRBN-FM. Francisco Javier Fimbres Durazo, who already ran XEKT 1390 AM in Tecate, won the concession and built the station, changing the call sign to XHFJ-FM for his initials on August 5, 1996. During this time, Fimbres operated his stations in association with Cadena Baja California, which owned XEMBC-AM 1190 XEWV-AM, & XEWV-FM. At that time, XHFJ adopted an alternative rock music format as "Modern Rock". On November 11, 2003, XHFJ became XHMIX-FM to go with the station's name at the time, "Mix 98". In 2005, the station became known as "Zona 98" with a rock format.

The current concessionaire, controlled 60% by Fimbres Durazo, was created in 2007.

In 2010, the station changed formats again to the present "Power 98 Jams".

In 2016, XHMIX was authorized to increase its effective radiated power from 30,000 watts to 50,000.
