= KINO =

- Winslow, Arizona; United States
- Frequency: 1230 kHz
- Branding: Route 66 Radio

Programming
- Format: Country
- Affiliations: Arizona Diamondbacks

Ownership
- Owner: Sunflower Communications, Inc.

History
- First air date: 1963
- Last air date: February 28, 2026
- Former call signs: KVNC (1952–1963)

Technical information
- Facility ID: 63925
- Class: C
- Power: 1,000 watts (unlimited)
- Transmitter coordinates: 35°2′7.5″N 110°42′58.7″W

KINO (1230 AM, "Route 66 Radio") was a radio station in Winslow, Arizona, United States. The station was owned by Sunflower Communications, Inc. and aired a country music format. Other programming consisted of local news, weather, and sports which included the Arizona Diamondbacks and live broadcasts of the local Winslow High School sports teams.

KINO began broadcasting in 1963 as the replacement for KVNC, an earlier station forced off the air by ownership conflicts. For most of its history, it was owned by Loy Engelhardt, who served as sportscaster for Winslow sports. He retired in 2026 and shut down the station.

== History ==
A predecessor to KINO began broadcasting in 1952. It originally had the call sign KVNC ("Voice of Navaho County"), licensed to Gila Broadcasting Co., and broadcast at the 1010 AM frequency. In 1960, Gila had intended to sell KVNC and four other stations to Earl Perrin, Jr., of Chicago. However, the stations went dark on October 29, 1960, after several conflicts with the Federal Communications Commission (FCC). The stations were ultimately sold to Carleton W. Morris for $100,000 USD (equivalent to $1,064,356 in 2025), which led to Morris asking the FCC for permission to set up new stations with the former Gila facilities in August 1962. The former call letters were then canceled on January 17, 1963.

Under the ownership of Morris, the station received the call sign of KINO and formally moved to the 1230 AM frequency in 1963. The station was sold in 1977 to former KABI sports host Loy Engelhardt, who moved in from Abilene, Kansas, with the desire to own a radio station. For most of his ownership tenure, Engelhardt doubled as the announcer for the station's broadcasts of Winslow High School sports. KINO closed down permanently on February 28, 2026, and surrendered its license to the FCC. The license was cancelled on March 12, 2026.
