= XHUS-TDT =

Educational television station at the University of Sonora

- Hermosillo, Sonora; Mexico
- Channels: Digital: 8 (VHF); Virtual: 8
- Branding: Unison TV

Ownership
- Owner: Universidad de Sonora
- Sister stations: XHUSH-FM

History
- Founded: 1965
- Call sign meaning: Universidad de Sonora

Technical information
- Licensing authority: CRT
- ERP: 38.43 kW
- HAAT: 192 m (630 ft)
- Transmitter coordinates: 29°03′41″N 110°56′32″W

Links
- Website: television.unison.mx

XHUS-TDT (channel 8), known as "Unison TV", is an educational television station owned and operated by the University of Sonora (UniSon) in Hermosillo, Sonora, Mexico.

== History ==
XHUS-TV signed on air in 1965 with 1 kW of power; it was officially launched on December 4 of that year. It shared studio facilities with XEUS-AM "Radio Universidad" and broadcast from 8 to 10pm, Monday through Friday. It broadcast local events such as the 1969 Juegos Universitarios, which were hosted by UniSon.

Due to economic problems, channel 8 signed off in 1973. In the late 1970s, work began to bring the station back to the air; in 1977, paperwork was filed to bring channel 8 back on air and new videotape equipment was acquired the next year. However, the conversion of the original DWM transmitter to color operation caused problems.

At last, in 1979, channel 8 returned to the air under agreement with the Instituto Politécnico Nacional, through which XHUS rebroadcast its Canal Once via microwave link. This was replaced by a satellite connection in 1981.

In 2002, XHUS went off the air yet again, not returning until fall 2010. The bulk of XHUS's programming is sourced via contract with Canal Once, Canal 22 and TV UNAM.

The station had not built digital facilities by late 2015; in order to remain on air for an additional year, XHUS reduced power to 1 kW. In 2016, XHUS migrated to digital on channel 8—one of very few VHF digital TV stations in Mexico.

On December 4, 2017, XHUS rebranded as "Unison TV".
