= XHEHF-FM =

Radio station in Nogales, Sonora, Mexico

- Nogales, Sonora; Mexico
- Frequency: 89.1 MHz (HD Radio)
- Branding: Radio Fórmula

Programming
- Format: News/Talk

Ownership
- Owner: Grupo Fórmula Sonora; (Transmisora Regional Radio Fórmula, S.A. de C.V.)
- Sister stations: XHYF-FM (Hermosillo)

History
- First air date: 1934; July 30, 2018 (FM)
- Former call signs: XEHF-AM (1941–2019)
- Former frequencies: 1370 kHz (1940s–2019)

Technical information
- Licensing authority: CRT
- Class: A
- ERP: 3,000 watts
- HAAT: −37.4 m (−123 ft)

Links
- Webcast: Listen live
- Website: radioformula.mx

XHEHF-FM is a radio station on 89.1 FM in Nogales, Sonora, Mexico. It is owned by Grupo Fórmula and carries its Radio Fórmula format.

== History ==
An antecedent of XHEHF was the first radio station to operate in the state of Sonora. Manuel Mascareñas built and signed on XEAF-AM in 1934; soon after, he died, leaving the station to his brother Gastón. The early XEAF broadcast at a frequency of 990 kHz. XEAF's concession was revoked for political reasons in 1939, after Manuel Ávila Camacho made a presidential campaign stop in Nogales. While XEAF, whose owners sympathized with Ávila Camacho, began to cover the event, transmission staff pulled the plug, as stations were prevented from broadcasting political content; the concession was revoked a short time later. A concession was issued on June 14, 1941, as a 1,000-watt radio station on 1000 kHz, moved within several years to 1370 kHz. The station was authorized for 5,000 watts, but did not use all of its power often due to the expense of running at full power. Aside from the short-lived XEY, which was unable to obtain a concession and folded within a year, XEHF would remain the only radio station in Nogales, Sonora until XEXW-AM signed on in 1955.

In 1973, José Alberto Padilla Navarro became the concessionaire of XEHF. The station was sold to Radio Fórmula in 2000.

In 2017, XEHF and almost all of the other AM radio stations in Nogales were authorized to migrate to the FM band as part of a second round of AM-FM migration. XEHF was selected to move to 89.1 MHz and change its callsign to XHEHF-FM as a result. XHEHF-FM signed on in July 2018.

Like other second-wave migrants owned by Radio Fórmula, the FM station offers three total subchannels, including the national Segunda Cadena feed and the Trión musical format. The AM station was closed on July 30, 2019, after the requisite year of simulcasting.

Between the early 2010s and May 2019, Grupo Larsa Comunicaciones sold ad time and added some local programming to XHEHF and XHYF-FM in Hermosillo in an operating agreement with Radio Fórmula. That agreement ended May 10, 2019, and on May 13, a newscast from the Expreso newspaper began to air on the stations instead as the newspaper took over local operations. Expreso continued to represent XHYF and XHEHF through the end of 2021.

On March 1, 2022, it changed to Trión a rock format. In 2024, XHEHF changed formats to Spanish contemporary format branded as Felix.

On April 6, 2026, he will leave the Fénix format to return to spoken programming on Radio Fórmula.
