= XHESO-FM =

Radio station in Ciudad Obregón, Sonora, Mexico

- Ciudad Obregón, Sonora; Mexico
- Frequency: 104.9 FM
- Branding: Studio 104.9

Programming
- Format: English and Spanish classic hits

Ownership
- Owner: Grupo Radiorama; (XESO-AM, S.A. de C.V.)
- Sister stations: XHAP-FM, XHOBS-FM

History
- First air date: December 10, 1992 (concession)
- Call sign meaning: "Sonora"

Technical information
- Licensing authority: CRT
- Class: B1
- ERP: 25 kW
- HAAT: 55.5 m (182 ft)
- Transmitter coordinates: 27°30′04″N 109°58′37″W

Links
- Website: radioramasonora

XHESO-FM is a radio station on 104.9 FM in Ciudad Obregón, Sonora, Mexico. The station is owned by Grupo Radiorama and carries its Studio 104.9 with English and Spanish classic hits format.

== History ==
XESO-AM 1150 received its concession on December 10, 1992. It was owned by Radio Signo, S.A., a subsidiary of Radiorama, and operated with 5 kW day and 300 watts at night. Radiorama leased most of its Sonora stations to Grupo Larsa Comuncaciones in the early 2010s.

In December 2011, XESO was cleared to move to FM as XHESO-FM 104.9.

In April 2018, XHESO ditched its Fiesta Mexicana name and took on imaging matching that of its Hermosillo then-sister station XHHQ-FM as "La Número Uno". As a result of XHHQ's alliance with Larsa being dismantled, XHESO was relaunched as "La Más Chingona", in line with XHVSS-FM, in November of that year.

In August 2019, XHESO temporarily went silent as Larsa ceased its own operations in Ciudad Obregón, affecting three stations. It reemerged in September as Los 40 under ISA Multimedia management.

ISA ceased radio operations throughout the state of Sonora on December 31, 2021. A new format under direct Radiorama management, the @FM pop hits brand, was debuted in February 2022.

On September 1, 2025, a major change occurred: the Studio format moved from XHAP-FM 96.9 to XHESO, upon an operator change.
