= KASA (AM) =

Regional Mexican radio station in Phoenix, Arizona

- Phoenix, Arizona; United States
- Broadcast area: Phoenix metropolitan area
- Frequency: 1540 kHz
- Branding: La Indiscreta FM

Programming
- Language: Spanish
- Format: Defunct, was classic regional Mexican

Ownership
- Owner: KASA Radio Hogar, Inc.

History
- First air date: January 6, 1966
- Last air date: May 8, 2024 (58 years, 123 days)
- Call sign meaning: Derived from "casa" ("house" in Spanish)

Technical information
- Licensing authority: FCC
- Facility ID: 33451
- Class: D
- Power: 10,000 watts (day); 19 watts (night)
- Transmitter coordinates: 33°22′36.16″N 112°5′27.53″W
- Translator: 106.7 K294CW (Phoenix)

Links
- Public license information: Public file; LMS
- Website: www.laindiscretafm.com

KASA (1540 kHz) was a commercial radio station broadcasting a classic regional Mexican radio format. It was licensed to Phoenix, Arizona, and was owned by KASA Radio Hogar, Inc. The studios are on West Baseline Road in Phoenix.

By day, KASA transmitted with 10,000 watts. Because 1540 AM is a clear channel frequency, KASA reduced power at night to 19 watts to avoid interference to other stations. It used a directional antenna at all times. The transmitter was on West Baseline Road in Phoenix at South 15th Avenue. Programming was also heard on 150-watt FM translator K294CW at 106.7 MHz in Phoenix.

== History ==
KASA signed on January 6, 1966. It originally was a daytimer station, powered at 10,000 watts but required to go off the air at night. The call sign KASA had once been assigned to a radio station in Elk City, Oklahoma. It was a Christian radio station, the second in Phoenix behind KHEP at 1280 kHz, and was built by Seattle-based Eastside Broadcasting, which also owned four religious radio stations in Washington state. George T. Wilson served as President and General Manager.

In April 1980, it built and signed on an FM sister station, 107.9 KMLE, which broadcast a mix of religious programs and easy listening music. On October 24, 1988, Shamrock Broadcasting purchased the FM station.

After airing Christian programming for much of its history, in 2018, KASA made a change. It relaunched as "La Indiscreta 106.7 FM" with a classic regional Mexican format. The dial position came from the frequency of its FM translator.

On May 8, 2024, the Federal Communications Commission (FCC) ordered KASA and K294CW off the air after finding that KASA had not operated from an authorized facility for over a year, resulting in the expiration of its license. K294CW had also been found to be interfering with KFUE.

The Federal Communications Commission cancelled the station’s license on May 8, 2024.

== Translator ==
Call sign	Frequency	City of license	FID	ERP (W)	Class	Transmitter coordinates	FCC info
K294CW	106.7 FM	Phoenix, Arizona	148238	150	D	33°35′39.1″N 112°5′10.5″W	LMS
