= XHPMAS-FM =

Radio station in Guaymas, Sonora

XHPMAS-FM/XHPNAV-FM
- Guaymas, Sonora Navojoa, Sonora; Mexico
- Frequencies: 100.5 MHz (HD Radio); 89.7 MHz (HD Radio)
- Branding: Sonora Grupera

Programming
- Format: Grupera

Ownership
- Owner: Expreso; (Medios y Editorial de Sonora, S.A. de C.V.)
- Sister stations: XHPUAY-FM/XHPJOA-FM "Pop Extremo"

History
- First air date: 2018
- Call sign meaning: GuayMAS; NAVojoa

Technical information
- Licensing authority: CRT
- Class: B1, A
- ERP: XHPMAS: 1,503 watts XHPNAV: 531 watts
- HAAT: XHPMAS: 462.1 m (1,516 ft); XHPNAV: 292.3 m (959 ft)
- Transmitter coordinates: 27°56′29.7″N 110°54′19″W; 27°04′59.7″N 109°17′21.4″W

Links
- Website: sonoragrupera.com

XHPMAS-FM and XHPNAV-FM are radio stations broadcasting on 100.5 FM in Guaymas and 89.7 FM in Navojoa, Sonora, owned by the Expreso newspaper. The stations form a simulcast known as Sonora Grupera, carrying a grupera format.

XHPMAS transmits from a tower atop Cerro El Vigía, while XHPNAV broadcasts from Cerro Prieto.

== History ==
Medios y Editorial de Sonora initially won two stations, one each in Guaymas and Navojoa, in the IFT-4 station auction of 2017. This included XHPMAS, which cost 11 million pesos. XHPNAV was subsequently won after the initial winning bidder for the frequency dropped out, with a winning bid of 5.5 million pesos.

The stations signed on at the end of August 2018 in a simulcast.
