= XHDR-FM =

Radio station in Guaymas, Sonora, Mexico

- Guaymas, Sonora; Mexico
- Frequency: 99.5 MHz
- Branding: La Patrona

Programming
- Format: Regional Mexican

Ownership
- Owner: Grupo Radio Guaymas; (Claudia Elena Lizárraga Verdugo)
- Sister stations: XHEPS-FM, XHNZI-FM

History
- First air date: March 29, 1938 (concession); 1994 (on FM)
- Former call signs: XEDR-AM (1938–2018)
- Former frequencies: 1490 kHz (1938–2000s); 830 kHz (2000s–2018)

Technical information
- Licensing authority: CRT
- Class: A
- ERP: 2.21 kW
- HAAT: 132.1 m (433 ft)

Links
- Website: www.gruporadioguaymas.com

XHDR-FM 99.5 is a radio station in Guaymas, Sonora, Mexico. It carries a regional Mexican format known as La Patrona and is owned locally by Grupo Radio Guaymas.

== History ==
XEDR received its first concession in 1938, as the first radio station in Guaymas. It was owned by Modesto Ortega and broadcast on 1490 kHz. By the 1960s, Ortega had died, and his successors owned the station.

The station added an FM combo in 1994, XHDR-FM 99.5. In the mid-2000s, it also moved from 1490 to 830, changing from a 1 kW day/0.25 kW night station to offer 2.5 kilowatts of power during the day.

In 2012, the station was sold after decades of being owned by Ortega's successors, to Radio Amistad de Sonora, owned by the Lizárraga Verdugo family. In a letter dated December 11, 2017, Radio Amistad de Sonora told the Federal Telecommunications Institute of its decision not to renew the AM station, leaving XHDR as an FM-only operation.
