= XHAQ-FM =

Radio station in Agua Prieta, Sonora, Mexico

- Agua Prieta, Sonora; Mexico
- Frequency: 106.9 MHz
- Branding: Radio Mundo

Programming
- Format: Instrumental

Ownership
- Owner: Radio Internacional del Comercio, S. de R.L. de C.V.

History
- First air date: July 2, 1946 (concession)

Technical information
- Licensing authority: CRT
- Class: B1
- ERP: 20 kW
- HAAT: 23.8 m (78 ft)
- Transmitter coordinates: 31°19′38″N 109°34′07″W

Links
- Website: radiomundo.com.mx

XHAQ-FM is a radio station on 106.9 FM in Agua Prieta, Sonora, Mexico. It is known as Radio Mundo.

== History ==
XEAQ-AM originated in 1946 with test transmissions, picking up its concession on April 1, 1947. It was Agua Prieta's first regularly licensed radio station, owned by Manuel Rodríguez Verdugo doing business as Radio Internacional del Comercio, S. de R.L. XEAQ was assigned the frequency of 1490 kHz and operated with 250 watts.

In 1951, Manuel opted to get out of the radio business. He transferred XEAQ to his brother Jesús Rodríguez Verdugo and Héctor Rivera Esquer, who owned XEFH-AM Radio Plan. XEAQ and XEFH, now sister stations, engaged in a sort of "friendly competition" with each other, which remained until the 1980s, a turbulent decade that involved many changes for the stations. The first of these came when XEAQ and XEFH moved to new facilities after Rodríguez Verdugo sold his stakes in the business. XEAQ affiliated to Grupo ACIR, while the arrival of Mexican television in Agua Prieta via repeaters of the XEW and Canal 13 networks from Mexico City attracted attention away from radio listeners.

In 1997, XEAQ flipped from a format of popular ballads to grupera as "La Caliente", putting it in competition with XHSAP-FM which had signed on four years earlier as the first commercial FM station in the area.

XEAQ was cleared for AM-FM migration in December 2011.
