= XHEPS-FM =

Radio station in Guaymas, Sonora

- Guaymas, Sonora; Mexico
- Frequency: 102.1 FM
- Branding: La Rielera

Programming
- Format: Grupera

Ownership
- Owner: Radio Amistad de Sonora, S.A. de C.V.
- Sister stations: XHDR-FM

History
- First air date: January 9, 1969 (concession)

Technical information
- Licensing authority: CRT
- Class: B
- ERP: 6 kW
- HAAT: 462.1 m (1,516 ft)
- Transmitter coordinates: 27°55′44″N 110°53′35″W

Links
- Website: www.gruporadioguaymas.com

XHEPS-FM is a radio station on 102.1 FM in Guaymas, Sonora. It is owned by Radio Amistad de Sonora, S.A. de C.V. and is known as La Rielera with a grupera format.

== History ==
XEPS-AM 1400, based in Empalme, received its concession on January 9, 1969. The 500-watt day/250-watt night station was owned by Hugo Águilar Flores. By the 1980s, it was sold to Radio Amistad de Sonora and broadcast on 710 kHz, with a higher daytime power of 1,000 watts.

XEPS migrated to FM in 2010 as XHEPS-FM 102.1.
