= XHLBL-FM =

Radio station in San Luis Río Colorado, Sonora, Mexico

- San Luis Río Colorado, Sonora; Mexico
- Frequencies: 1350 KHz; 93.9 MHz (HD Radio)
- Branding: Radio Centro

Programming
- Language: Spanish
- Format: Adult hits

Ownership
- Owner: Radio Grupo OIR Sonora; (Radio Impulsora de San Luis, S.A. de C.V.)
- Sister stations: XECB-AM, XHLPS-FM, XHSLR-FM, XHRCL-FM, XHMIX-FM, XHEMW-FM, XHDY-FM

History
- First air date: March 5, 1965 (concession)
- Call sign meaning: Initials of owner Luis Blando López

Technical information
- Licensing authority: CRT
- Class: A (FM); B (AM)
- Power: AM: 8,000 watts day
- ERP: FM: 3,000 watts
- HAAT: FM: 22.8 m (75 ft)
- Transmitter coordinates: 32°26′58.7″N 114°45′25.0″W (AM); 32°27′39″N 114°49′01″W (FM)

XHLBL-FM/XELBL-AM is a combo radio station on 93.9 FM and 1350 AM in San Luis Río Colorado, Sonora. It is owned by Radio Grupo OIR Sonora and carries a Spanish-language Adult hits format known as Radio Centro.

== History ==
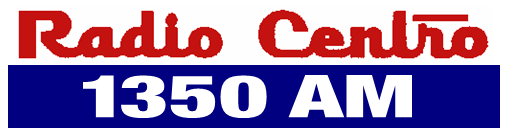
Final logo as Radio Centro on 1350 AM

XEXV-AM received its concession on March 5, 1965. It was owned by Enrique Escalera García and came to the air as a 500-watt daytimer. The callsign was changed by 1972, and García sold XELBL to Radiodifusora del Colorado in 1978. The current concessionaire acquired the station in 1994 and the station increased power to 8,000 watts.

In 2018, Radio Grupo OIR selected XEMW 1260 and XELBL to migrate to FM. Coinciding with the launch of XHLBL-FM 93.9, a format shuffle ensued in which the Río Digital pop music format was moved from XHDY-FM 107.1 to XHLBL, and XELBL's old Radio Centro adult hits format was moved to the newly migrated XHEMW-FM 91.1. In February 2019, XHEMW and XHLBL swapped formats, with Radio Centro being moved to 93.9 and Río Digital being moved to 91.1.
