= XENY-AM =

Radio station in Nogales, Sonora

- Nogales, Sonora; Mexico
- Frequency: 760 AM
- Branding: Radio XENY

Programming
- Format: Variety

Ownership
- Owner: Sucesión de Ramón Guzmán Rivera
- Sister stations: XHNI-FM

History
- First air date: September 11, 1961

Technical information
- Licensing authority: CRT
- Class: B
- Power: 5 kW day/0.1 kW night

Links
- Webcast: Listen live
- Website: xenygenial.com

XENY-AM is a radio station on 760 AM in Nogales, Sonora, Mexico.

== History ==
Ramón Guzmán Rivera obtained the concession for XENY, then on 1270 kHz, on September 11, 1961. It operated with 1,000 watts day and 250 watts night. Guzmán Rivera died in the mid-1990s and the station has continued in the family.

XENY moved to 760 kHz by the 1980s and raised its power to current levels by the 2000s.

The XENY-AM frequency was not migrated to FM, as the XEXW-AM frequency was the last to migrate to FM in Nogales.
