= XHRZ-FM =

Radio station in Nogales, Sonora

- Nogales, Sonora; Mexico
- Frequency: 103.5 MHz
- Branding: La Bestia Grupera

Programming
- Format: Grupera

Ownership
- Owner: Grupo Radiorama; (XHRZ-FM, S.A. de C.V.)
- Operator: Grupo Audiorama Sonora
- Sister stations: XHXW-FM

History
- First air date: November 30, 1973 (concession)

Technical information
- Licensing authority: CRT
- Class: B1
- ERP: 20.85 kW
- HAAT: 32.5 m (107 ft)

Links
- Webcast: Listen live
- Website: audioramasonora.mx

XHRZ-FM is a radio station on 103.5 FM in Nogales, Sonora, Mexico. The station is operated by Grupo Audiorama Sonora and carries its La Bestia Grupera format.

== History ==
XHRZ received its concession on November 30, 1973. It was owned by Manuel Montoya Obregón. XHRZ was originally slated to be on 89.1 MHz.

Radiorama bought the station in 2002 and then leasing it to Larsa in 2012 when Radiorama shed many of its stations in Sonora.

This station reverted to Radiorama control but the station is operated by Audiorama, a related company to Radiorama, until October 4, 2021, the station formally launched La Bestia Grupera 103.5 FM, a regional mexican format.
