= XHOBS-FM =

Radio station in Ciudad Obregón, Sonora, Mexico

- Ciudad Obregón, Sonora; Mexico
- Frequency: 92.1 MHz
- Branding: Con Madre

Programming
- Format: Grupera

Ownership
- Owner: Grupo Radiorama; (XEOBS-AM, S.A. de C.V.)
- Sister stations: XHAP-FM, XHESO-FM

History
- First air date: March 11, 1988 (concession)
- Former call signs: XEOBS-AM
- Former frequencies: 1070 kHz (1988–2018)
- Call sign meaning: "Obregón, Sonora"

Technical information
- Licensing authority: CRT
- Class: B1
- ERP: 25 kW
- HAAT: 49.85 m (163.5 ft)
- Transmitter coordinates: 27°29′34″N 109°56′44.45″W

Links
- Webcast: Listen live
- Website: radioramasonora.com

XHOBS-FM is a radio station on 92.1 FM in Ciudad Obregón, Sonora, Mexico. It is owned by Grupo Radiorama and carries a grupera format known as Con Madre.

== History ==
XEOBS-AM 1070 received its concession on March 11, 1988. It was a daytime-only station owned by Grupo Radiorama subsidiary Futuro Sonoro, S.A. It migrated to FM in 2011, and soon after, Radiorama largely exited Sonora and leasing its stations to Grupo Larsa Comunicaciones.

In April 2018, Larsa ditched the Xtasis English classic hits format for pop using the Arroba FM brand owned by Radiorama.

On June 4, 2019, ISA Corporativo, an outdoor advertising company, entered broadcasting by assuming operations of XHOBS and XHAP-FM 96.9. It immediately flipped XHOBS to La Ke Buena format from Televisa Radio and instituted a news service powered by the Diario del Yaqui and Diario del Mayo newspapers.

ISA ceased radio operations throughout the state of Sonora on December 31, 2021. A new format under direct Radiorama management, known as Con Madre, was debuted in February 2022. Con Madre moved to XHAP-FM in June 2022 to allow Radiovisa to take over operations of the two stations, with the La Que Manda brand already used by Radiovisa in Guaymas (XHGYS-FM) and Caborca (XHIB-FM) placed on XHOBS. 3 days later they undo the changes and return to Con Madre, ending La Que Manda.
