= XHGON-FM =

Radio station in Ciudad Obregón, Sonora

- Ciudad Obregón, Sonora; Mexico
- Broadcast area: Ciudad Obregón, Sonora
- Frequency: 92.9 FM
- Branding: La Kaliente

Programming
- Format: Grupera

Ownership
- Owner: Radio S.A.; (Carlos de Jesús Quiñones Armendáriz)
- Sister stations: XHHO-FM

History
- First air date: August 7, 1992 (concession)
- Call sign meaning: Last three letters of Ciudad Obregón

Technical information
- Licensing authority: CRT
- Class: B
- ERP: 50 kW
- HAAT: 92.5 m (303 ft)

Links
- Webcast: Listen live
- Website: maxplay.com.mx

XHGON-FM is a radio station on 92.9 FM in Ciudad Obregón, Sonora. The station is owned by Radio S.A. and carries a grupera format known as La Kaliente.

== History ==
XHGON received its concession on August 7, 1992. It was owned by Roberto Torres García. In March 2004, Torres García sold the station to Radio S.A.

Until late 2021 the station was known as Grupera and became La Kaliente in 2022.

Unionized workers at XHGON-FM La Kaliente 92.9, facing what they consider an unfair situation, decided several weeks ago to stage a protest by stopping all on-air speaking during regular programming. Instead, they limited their broadcasts to playing music and airing the scheduled commercial advertisements.

However, on Thursday, November 19, they decided to take their protest a step further in an effort to get the company's owners to hear their demands.

Throughout the station's entire broadcast schedule, they have been playing just one song: “No Tengo Dinero” by Juan Gabriel, in its version featuring Kumbia Kings and Gran Silencio.

The protest action is endorsed by the Mexican Republic's Union of Workers in the Broadcasting, Television, Telecommunications, Related and Allied Industries (STIRTT).

This measure will remain in effect until an agreement is reached with the owners of Radio, S.A.
