= XHDY-FM =

Radio station in Ciudad Morelos, Baja California, Mexico

Simulcast of XECB-AM 1460
- Ciudad Morelos, Baja California; Mexico
- Broadcast area: San Luis Río Colorado, Sonora
- Frequency: 107.1 FM
- Branding: Radio Ranchito

Programming
- Format: Regional Mexican

Ownership
- Owner: Radio Grupo OIR Sonora; (Radio y Producción de Calidad, S.A. de C.V.)
- Sister stations: XHEMW-FM, XHLBL-FM, XHSLR-FM, XHMIX-FM, XHLPS-FM, XHRCL-FM

History
- First air date: February 22, 1966 (concession)
- Former call signs: XEDY-AM
- Former frequencies: 1080 kHz (1966-2010s)

Technical information
- Licensing authority: CRT
- Class: B1
- ERP: 25 kW
- HAAT: 48.92 meters (160.5 ft)
- Transmitter coordinates: 32°38′01″N 114°50′43″W

XHDY-FM is a radio station on 107.1 FM in Ciudad Morelos, Baja California, licensed to San Luis Río Colorado, Sonora. The station is owned by Radio Grupo OIR Sonora and carries a simulcast of XECB-AM known as Radio Ranchito, which carries a Regional Mexican format.

== History ==
XHDY began as XEDY-AM on 1080 kHz, which received its concession on February 22, 1966, after signing on in 1965. It was owned by Eloisa Eguía Tello de Brassea. Her brother, Antonio, had founded XEAA-AM and owned it for four years before dying in a car accident in 1942. By the mid-80s, XEDY was the last locally owned station in Mexicali, being courted by Francisco Aguirre Jiménez's Organización Impulsora de Radio (OIR). After initially turning down OIR's offer of affiliation, the network offered her son Antonio Brassea Eguía an administrative post, and she accepted; several years later, OIR acquired the station.

XEDY was approved to migrate to FM in 2011, later shutting off its AM transmitter. Operation of the station was also moved across the Colorado River from Ciudad Morelos, Baja California to San Luis Río Colorado, Sonora.

In 2018, upon migrating two of its four AM stations in San Luis Río Colorado to FM, Radio Grupo OIR placed a simulcast of XECB-AM 1460, one of the two stations not migrated, on XHDY-FM; the Río Digital pop music format was moved to one of the new stations, XHLBL-FM 93.9.
