= XHEB-FM =

Radio station in Ciudad Obregón, Sonora

XHEB-FM and XEEB-AM
- Ciudad Obregón, Sonora; Mexico
- Frequency: 98.5 FM
- Branding: La Zeta

Programming
- Format: Pop

Ownership
- Owner: Uniradio; (Difusión Radiofónica de Ciudad Obregón, S.A. de C.V.)

History
- First air date: March 2, 1959 (concession)

Technical information
- Licensing authority: CRT
- Class: B1 (FM); B (AM)
- Power: 5,000 watts (daytime) (AM)
- ERP: 5.4 kW (FM)
- HAAT: 238.6 m (783 ft)
- Transmitter coordinates: 27°26′50″N 109°46′44″W (FM), 27°34′34.36″N 109°56′33.31″W (AM)

Links
- Website: www.uniradioinforma.com/player/z98

XHEB-FM and XEEB-AM is a radio station in Ciudad Obregón, Sonora. Broadcasting on 98.5 FM and 760 AM, XHEB is owned by Uniradio and carries a pop format known as La Zeta.

== History ==
XEEB-AM 1010 received its concession on March 2, 1959. It was owned by Radiofónicas de Sonora, S. de R.L., and broadcast from Esperanza, Sonora. In 1972, it was sold to Radio XEEB, S.A., which marked the start of Grupo ACIR operation of the station and its move into Ciudad Obregón. In the early 2000s, XEEB increased its power by moving to 760 kHz.

Uniradio took control of XEEB in 2010 and moved it to FM, with transmitter facilities on Cerro La Cabana.
