= XHEPB-FM =

Radio station in Hermosillo, Sonora, Mexico

- Hermosillo, Sonora; Mexico
- Frequency: 93.1 FM
- Branding: Love

Programming
- Format: Spanish hits

Ownership
- Owner: Radio SA; (Carlos de Jesús Quiñones Armendáriz)
- Sister stations: XHEDL-FM, XHVS-FM, XHMMO-FM

History
- First air date: June 11, 1993 (concession)
- Call sign meaning: Hugo Pennock Bravo (original concessionaire)

Technical information
- Class: B1
- ERP: 25 kW
- Transmitter coordinates: 29°04′36″N 110°59′26″W

Links
- Webcast: Listen live
- Website: maxplay.com.mx

XHEPB-FM is a radio station in Hermosillo, Sonora, Mexico. Broadcasting on 93.1 FM, XHEPB is owned by Radio SA.

== History ==
XEPB-AM received its concession on December 27, 1960. It took its calls from concessionaire Hugo Pennock Bravo and broadcast on 1400 kHz with 250 watts. In 1969, control passed to Radio Pitic, S.A., and power was increased to one kilowatt. Sometime in the early 2000s, XEPB moved to 950 kHz and increased its power to 10 kW. Radio SA bought XEPB in the 2000s and moved the station to FM in 2011.

In April 2019, the station rebranded from Grupera 93.1 to Latino 93.1. The new format ended on August 31, 2020, when the station began airing El Heraldo Radio.

In August 2021 ends El Heraldo Radio and become Love.
