= XHFH-FM =

Radio station in Agua Prieta, Sonora, Mexico

- Agua Prieta, Sonora; Mexico
- Frequency: 107.9 MHz
- Branding: Radio Plan de Agua Prieta

Programming
- Format: Grupera

Ownership
- Owner: Héctor Rivera Esquer

History
- First air date: May 1, 1950

Technical information
- Licensing authority: CRT
- Class: B1
- ERP: 25 kW
- HAAT: −16.2 m (−53 ft)
- Transmitter coordinates: 31°17′35″N 109°32′28″W

XHFH-FM is a radio station on 107.9 FM in Aqua Prieta, Sonora, Mexico. It is known as Radio Plan de Agua Prieta.

== History ==
XEFH-AM 1310 was Agua Prieta's second regularly licensed radio station, coming to air on May 1, 1950 after receiving its concession the previous fall. It was owned by Jesús Rodríguez Verdugo and Héctor Rivera Esquer, who acquired XEAQ-AM in 1951. XEFH used a homemade transmitter made by an engineer in Bisbee. XEAQ and the 1,000-watt XEFH, now sister stations, engaged in a sort of "friendly competition" with each other, which remained until the 1980s, a turbulent decade that involved many changes for the stations. The first of these came when XEAQ and XEFH moved to new facilities after Rodríguez Verdugo sold his stakes in the business. XEFH affiliated to Cadena RASA for news programs, while the arrival of Mexican television in Agua Prieta via repeaters of the XEW and Canal 13 networks from Mexico City attracted attention away from radio listeners.

XEFH was cleared for AM-FM migration in December 2011.
