= XHEDL-FM =

Radio station in Hermosillo, Sonora

- Hermosillo, Sonora; Mexico
- Frequency: 89.7 MHz
- Branding: Activa 89.7

Programming
- Format: Pop in Spanish

Ownership
- Owner: Radio S.A.; (Carlos de Jesús Quiñones Armendáriz)
- Sister stations: XHEPB-FM, XHVS-FM, XHMMO-FM

History
- First air date: May 21, 1944 (concession)

Technical information
- Class: B1
- ERP: 25 kW
- Transmitter coordinates: 29°02′59.23″N 110°57′58.64″W

Links
- Webcast: Listen live
- Website: maxplay.com.mx

XHEDL-FM is a radio station on 89.7 FM in Hermosillo, Sonora. The station is owned by Radio S.A. and carries a pop format in Spanish known as Activa 89.7.

== History ==
XHEDL began as XEDL-AM 1250 in 1944, though its concession history dates only to 1958. It was owned by Francisco Vidal and later by Eufemia Esquer de Vidal.

In 1980, the station was among the first to be represented by Grupo Radio Comunicación, S.A. This formed the basis for what became known as Radio S.A. After Esquer de Vidal's death, the station was transferred from her estate to Carlos de Jesús Quiñones Armendáriz, the owner of Radio S.A.

In 2012, XEDL migrated to FM on 89.7 MHz and became known as "DL Radio 89.7, La Gran Diferencia", taking its slogan from sister station XEDA-AM in Mexico City. At that time, the station primarily had a talk format. At the end of 2013, XHEDL switched its talk format to pop in Spanish and became known as Activa 89.7.
