= XHSLR-FM =

Radio station in San Luis Río Colorado, Sonora

- San Luis Río Colorado, Sonora; Mexico
- Frequency: 107.9 MHz
- Branding: La Consentida

Programming
- Language: Spanish
- Format: Grupera
- Affiliations: Grupo Radio Centro

Ownership
- Owner: Radio Grupo OIR Sonora; (Radio y Televisión Internacional, S.A. de C.V.)
- Sister stations: XECB-AM, XHLPS-FM, XHLBL-FM, XHRCL-FM, XHMIX-FM, XHEMW-FM, XHDY-FM

History
- First air date: September 4, 1991 (concession)
- Call sign meaning: San Luis Río (Colorado)

Technical information
- Licensing authority: CRT
- Class: C
- ERP: 100 kW
- HAAT: 57.7 m (189 ft)
- Transmitter coordinates: 32°26′58.7″N 114°45′25.0″W

Links
- Website: www.radiogrupooir.com/consentida/

XHSLR-FM is a radio station in San Luis Río Colorado, Sonora, Mexico. Broadcasting on 107.9 FM, XHSLR is owned by Radio Grupo OIR Sonora and carries a grupera format known as La Consentida.

== History ==
The station's concession was awarded in 1994 to Elsa Gabriela Guajardo Tijerina. The concession was transferred in 2000.
