= XHDM-FM =

Radio station in Hermosillo, Sonora

- Hermosillo, Sonora; Mexico
- Frequency: 102.7 FM
- Branding: La Zeta

Programming
- Format: Spanish adult contemporary

Ownership
- Owner: Uniradio; (Promotora Unimedios, S.A. de C.V.)
- Sister stations: XHSD-FM, XHHOS-FM

History
- First air date: November 30, 1950 (concession)

Technical information
- Class: AA
- ERP: 5 kW
- Transmitter coordinates: 29°03′41″N 110°56′28″W

Links
- Webcast: Listen live
- Website: www.lazeta1027.com

XHDM-FM is a radio station on 102.7 FM in Hermosillo, Sonora, Mexico. It is owned by Uniradio and broadcasts Spanish-language adult contemporary format known as La Zeta.

== History ==
XEDM-AM 1580 received its concession on November 30, 1950. It was owned by Radio Pacífico, S.A., with a 50,000-watt signal at all hours.

On October 20, 1998, XEDM was approved to move its tower to Cerro La Cementera and reduced power to 10,000 watts.

XEDM was approved to migrate to FM in 2011 as XHDM-FM 102.7.

In September 2022, Grupo ACIR ceased operating the station with its La Comadre Regional Mexican format. The move came as ACIR sold several stations in various markets. Uniradio then began programming XHDM, resulting in the migration of La Zeta to that frequency from XHMV-FM 93.9, which it did not own outright. The concession transfer finally announced by IFT in 2024.
