= XEQC-AM =

Former radio station in Puerto Peñasco, Sonora

Puerto Peñasco, Sonora; Mexico
- Frequency: 1390 kHz

Programming
- Format: Pop
- Affiliations: Radio S.A.

Ownership
- Owner: Ángel Tanori Cruz

History
- First air date: June 5, 1972 (concession)
- Last air date: June 5, 2014 (expiration of last concession); 2017 (seizure of station)

Technical information
- Power: 1,000 watts day 150 watts night
- Transmitter coordinates: 31°19′24″N 113°31′50″W

XEQC-AM was a radio station broadcasting on 1390 kHz in Puerto Peñasco, Sonora. It was owned by Ángel Tanori Cruz and known as La Reyna del Mar.

XEQC's concession was not renewed following its expiration in 2014. The station continued broadcasting as a pirate until 2017, when its broadcasting equipment was seized.

== History ==
XEQC received its concession on June 5, 1972, making it the first radio station in Puerto Peñasco. It was a 500-watt daytimer and later broadcast with 1,000 watts during the day and 150 at night.

In 2009, XEQC was authorized to move to FM as XHEQC-FM 93.5. The move never materialized, and the station ultimately ceased transmitting eight years later when the Federal Telecommunications Institute shut down 1390 AM as a pirate, imposing a fine on Tanori Cruz and seizing the station's equipment.

The station was affiliated to Radio S.A.
