= XHAP-FM =

Radio station in Ciudad Obregón, Sonora, Mexico

- Ciudad Obregón, Sonora; Mexico
- Frequency: 96.9 FM
- Branding: La Número Uno

Programming
- Format: Grupera

Ownership
- Owner: Grupo Radiorama; (XEAP, S.A. de C.V.)
- Operator: Bura Grupo Multimedia
- Sister stations: XHESO-FM, XHOBS-FM

History
- First air date: March 8, 1936 (concession)

Technical information
- Licensing authority: CRT
- Class: B1
- ERP: 25 kW
- HAAT: 56.5 m (185 ft)
- Transmitter coordinates: 27°30′04″N 109°38′57″W

Links
- Webcast: Listen live
- Website: losnumerouno.com

XHAP-FM is a radio station on 96.9 FM in Ciudad Obregón, Sonora, Mexico.

== History ==
XEAP-AM received its concession on March 8, 1936, broadcasting with 100 watts on 1290 kHz and owned by Emilio Manzanilla. After his death, his successors continued to own the station, now at 1,000 watts, until 1982. It was then operated by Radiorama, and later by Grupo García de León. Ultimately, Radiorama took control of the station again, and it was under Radiorama in 2012 that XHAP-FM 96.9 came to air.

Radiorama largely exited Sonora in the early 2010s, leaving most of its stations there to Larsa to operate.

On June 4, 2019, ISA Corporativo, an outdoor advertising company, entered broadcasting by assuming operations of XHAP and XHOBS-FM 92.1. While XHAP's format was retained, ISA instituted a new news service powered by the Diario del Yaqui and Diario del Mayo newspapers.

ISA ceased radio operations throughout the state of Sonora on December 31, 2021. A new format under direct Radiorama management, the Studio English classic hits brand, was debuted in February 2022. It was used for four months before Con Madre, a grupera format, moved from XHOBS in June upon an operator change, 3 days later they undo the changes and return to Studio.

On September 1, 2025, XHAP 96.9 and XHSN-FM in Nogales leased to Bura Multimedia management based in Hermosillo, resulting the Studio format moved to XHESO-FM 104.9.
