= XHNI-FM =

Radio station in Nogales, Sonora

- Nogales, Sonora; Mexico
- Frequency: 105.1 FM
- Branding: Estéreo Genial

Programming
- Format: Grupera

Ownership
- Owner: María del Carmen Guzmán Muñoz
- Sister stations: XENY-AM

History
- First air date: June 22, 1979 (concession)

Technical information
- Licensing authority: CRT
- Class: B
- ERP: 25 kW
- HAAT: 140.1 m (460 ft)

Links
- Webcast: Listen live
- Website: xenygenial.com

XHNI-FM is a radio station on 105.1 FM in Nogales, Sonora, Mexico. The station is known as Estéreo Genial and carries a grupera format.

== History ==
XHNI received its concession on June 22, 1979. It is co-owned with XENY-AM.
