= XHBQ-FM =

Radio station in Guaymas, Sonora

XEBQ-AM/XHBQ-FM
- Guaymas, Sonora; Mexico
- Broadcast area: Guaymas, Sonora
- Frequencies: 1240 kHz; 105.3 MHz
- Branding: FM 105

Programming
- Format: Grupera

Ownership
- Owner: Grupo Padilla Hermanos; (GILHAAM, S.A. de C.V.)

History
- First air date: March 9, 1948; 1994 (FM)

Technical information
- Licensing authority: CRT
- Class: C1 (FM); C (AM)
- Power: 1 kW
- ERP: 10 kW
- HAAT: 485.3 m (1,592 ft)

Links
- Website: www.fm105.com.mx

XHBQ-FM 105.3/XEBQ-AM 1240 is a combo radio station in Guaymas, Sonora. It is owned by Grupo Padilla Hermanos and carries a grupera format known as FM 105.

== History ==
XEBQ received its first concession in 1948. It was owned by Raymundo López Lerma. In 1970, Alejandro Padilla Reyes bought XEBQ, and in 1994, it gained an FM combo, XHBQ-FM 105.3.

After Padilla Reyes's death, the Padilla family — Gloria Ruíz Leyva and Gloria Icela, Luis Héctor, Alejandro Alberto, and Mario Padilla Ruiz — inherited the station and organized as GILHAAM, S.A. de C.V. The name GILHAAM, an acronym of the names of the Padilla Ruiz siblings, is also used for another Padilla Hermanos venture, GILHAAM Grupo Funerario, which offers funeral services.
