= Universidad de Sonora =

University in Sonora, Mexico

University of Sonora
- Motto: El saber de mis hijos hará mi grandeza
- Motto in English: The knowledge of my children will be my greatness
- Type: Public
- Established: October 12, 1942; 83 years ago
- Rector: María Rita Plancarte Martínez
- Academic staff: 2481
- Students: 38148
- Location: Hermosillo, Sonora, Mexico; 29.083°N 110.962°W
- Colors: Blue & yellow
- Mascot: Owl
- Website: www.unison.mx

The University of Sonora (Universidad de Sonora, abbreviated as Unison) is a public university with a strong research program in the northwestern Mexican state of Sonora. The university was founded in 1942 and is considered the main cultural and educational driver in the state. The university motto is El saber de mis hijos hará mi grandeza ("The knowledge of my children will be my greatness"). It is the largest university of Sonora with about 30,000 students (about 28,000 for undergraduate studies and 2,000 for postgraduate studies) distributed in five campuses.

Dr. Enrique Velázquez Contreras started his tenure as the University Rector in June 2017 for a period of four years (renewable). Under his leadership the university has prepared its Strategic Initiative putting special emphasis on the Internationalization of its academic and research programs.

== Overview ==
According to the National Center for Evaluation for Higher Education (CENEVAL), Sonora has recently ranked fifth in the Mexican university ranking survey. It has six post-graduate subjects accredited in the level of academic excellence for the National Science and Technology Council (Consejo Nacional de Ciencia y Tecnología de México, CONACYT). It is currently leader of the National Association of Mexican Higher Education Institutions (ANUIES) in northwestern Mexico.

=== Academics ===
The University of Sonora has research departments and teaching schools in most academic disciplines. The university provides educational programs in the following colleges:

- Natural Science
- Engineering
- Exact Sciences
- Biological and Health Sciences
- Social Sciences
- Economics and Administration
- Humanities and Fine Arts

=== Postgraduate programs ===
At the postgraduate level, Unison tends to be biased towards scientific subjects, but it also has a number of strong humanities and social science schools. There are 6 subjects accredited in the level of academic excellence for CONACYT.

- Physics, PhD and Masters
- Mathematics, PhD and Masters
- Material Science, PhD and Masters
- Geology, Masters
- Engineering, Masters
- Food Science and Technology, PhD and Masters
- Inmunohematology, Postgraduate certificate
- Integral postgraduate of social sciences, PhD and Masters
- Psychology, PhD and Masters
- Business Administration, Masters

=== Admission ===
Admissions processes at Sonora are based on qualifications relevant to their chosen undergraduate course, admission tests given by the university, and, in some subjects, interviews between applicants and faculty members.

Postgraduate admission is first decided by the department or research center relating to the applicant's subject. In recent years, UNISON has made greater efforts to attract overseas students.

=== Research institutes ===
- Physics Department (DIFUS)
- Research Centre of Physics (CIFUS)
- DICTUS Research Centre
- DIPA Research Centre

== Campuses ==
There are five campuses. Its main campus is located in the capital of the state of Sonora, Hermosillo.

- Hermosillo
- Caborca
- Navojoa
- Nogales
- Santa Ana
- Cajeme
- Huatabampo

== Mobility of students ==
UNISON intends to increase the access and mobility of its students within the Americas and the European Union area of higher education, contributing to the improvement of their professional skills and their access to better working opportunities in the northwestern region of the country.

== Other items of interest ==
The university is part of the UN Regional Coordination of Activities in Basic Space Science for America, an aerospace consortium based in Vienna, Austria, and co-sponsored by the European Space Agency.

Starting in the 2011 season, the university will have a team named "Búhos" (Owls) playing in one league of College Football in Mexico, the CONADEIP premier league.

== Rectors ==
Period	Rector's name
1942–1943	Prof. Aureliano Esquivel Casas
1944–1946	Ing. Francisco Antonio Astiazarán
1946–1953	Prof. Manuel Quiróz Martínez
1953–1956	Ing. Norberto Aguirre Palancares
1956–1961	Lic. Luis Encinas Johnson
1961–1967	Dr. Moisés Canale Rodríguez
1967–1968	Lic. Roberto Reynoso Dávila
1968–1972	Dr. Federico Sotelo Ortiz
1973–1982	Lic. Alfonso Castellanos Idiáquez
1982–1987	Ing. Manuel Rivera Zamudio
1987–1989	Ing. Manuel Balcázar Meza
1989–1993	Mat. Marco Antonio Valencia Arvizu
1993–2001	M.C. Jorge Luis Ibarra Mendívil
2001–2009	Dr. Pedro Ortega Romero
2009–2017	Dr. Heriberto Grijalva Monteverde
2017–2021	Dr. Enrique Fernando Velázquez Contreras
2021–present	Dr. María Rita Plancarte Martínez

== Collaborations with other universities ==
- Sonora State University ("Universidad Estatal de Sonora")
- Universidad Miguel Hernández

== See also ==
- XHUS-TDT ("Televisión Universitaria", Unison's television station)
