= XHMMO-FM =

Radio station in Hermosillo, Sonora, Mexico

- Hermosillo, Sonora; Mexico
- Frequency: 105.1 MHz
- Branding: La Raza

Programming
- Format: Regional Mexican

Ownership
- Owner: Radio S.A.; (Comunicaciones ALREY, S.A. de C.V.)
- Sister stations: XHEDL-FM, XHEPB-FM, XHVS-FM

History
- First air date: July 7, 1992 (concession)

Technical information
- Licensing authority: CRT
- Class: B
- ERP: 39.56 kW
- HAAT: 96 m (315 ft)
- Transmitter coordinates: 29°7′40″N 110°56′34.2″W

Links
- Webcast: Listen live
- Website: maxplay.com.mx

XHMMO-FM is a radio station on 105.1 FM in Hermosillo, Sonora, Mexico. It is owned by Radio S.A. and known as La Raza.

== History ==
XHMMO received its concession on July 7, 1992. It was owned by María de Lourdes Palacios Andrade, but Radio S.A. began to operate the new station nearly immediately. In 1993, the group launched “FM 105.1 5 – 5 Canciones Continuas”, a format emphasizing playlists of five songs in a row. In 1994, the station flipped to grupera as "La Picuda 105.1". During this time, Radio S.A. also managed La Kaliente XHHLL-FM. In 1999, the concession was transferred to Comunicaciones ALREY.

Retaining the regional Mexican format, XHMMO became "La Raza 105.1" in 2000. The station flipped to oldies with the launch of Sonika 105.1 in 2012.

On February 3, 2023, the station changed its format to regional Mexican, relaunching as La Raza 105.1 FM.

However, XHMMO has been mired in the same labor problems affecting Radio S.A., including expired concessions, low pay, several strikes, as well as technical problems with FM transmitters.
