= XHCBR-FM =

Radio station in Caborca, Sonora, Mexico

- Caborca, Sonora; Mexico
- Frequency: 100.1 FM
- Branding: Max 101

Programming
- Format: Pop

Ownership
- Owner: Grupo Radio Palacios; (Radio Palacios, S.A. de C.V.)
- Sister stations: XHUK-FM, XHEZ-FM

History
- First air date: August 16, 1994 (concession)

Technical information
- Licensing authority: CRT
- Class: B
- ERP: 50 kW
- HAAT: 61.6 m (202 ft)

XHCBR-FM is a radio station in Caborca, Sonora, Mexico. Broadcasting on 100.1 FM, XHCBR is owned by Grupo Radio Palacios and branded as Max 101 with a pop format.

== History ==
XHCBR received its concession on August 16, 1994. It was owned by José Emilio López Silva, general manager of Grupo ACIR. In 2006, control of the station passed to Grupo Radio Palacios.
