= XHGYM-FM =

Radio station in Guaymas, Sonora, Mexico

Currently silent
- Guaymas, Sonora; Mexico
- Frequency: 103.7 MHz

Ownership
- Owner: Organiden, A.C.
- Sister stations: XHHER-FM

History
- First air date: February 2018
- Call sign meaning: Guaymas

Technical information
- Class: A
- ERP: 3 kW
- HAAT: 366.6 meters (1,203 ft)
- Transmitter coordinates: 27°56′51″N 110°54′00″W

XHGYM-FM is a noncommercial radio station on 103.7 FM in Guaymas, Sonora, Mexico. It is one of two social stations owned by concessionaire Organiden, A.C.

== History ==
Organiden applied for the permit for XHGYM in 2013. It was not awarded until December 14, 2016, and it took the station another year to come to air, signing on in January 2018. It operated as Voz Sonora, a noncommercial station under Radiovisa management, for slightly over a year.

In February 2019, XHGYM went silent. It returned on August 2, 2019, as grupera station La Más Chingona, operated by Grupo Larsa Comunicaciones. Larsa controlled no commercial radio stations in Guaymas. On November 10, 2019, XHGYM and XHHER-FM in Hermosillo changed from La Más Chingona to Toño, the company's adult hits format.

XHGYM went silent in October 2021, by which time it was just one of three stations programmed by Larsa.
