= XHRCL-FM =

- San Luis Río Colorado, Sonora; Mexico
- Frequency: 89.5 MHz
- Branding: Variedades FM

Programming
- Format: Variety

Ownership
- Owner: Radio Grupo OIR Sonora; (Radio Rocola, S.A. de C.V.)
- Sister stations: XHLPS-FM, XHLBL-FM, XHSLR-FM, XECB-AM, XHMIX-FM, XHEMW-FM, XHDY-FM

History
- First air date: August 16, 1994 (concession)
- Call sign meaning: "Río Colorado"

Technical information
- Licensing authority: CRT
- Class: B1
- ERP: 15 kW
- HAAT: 50.2 m (165 ft)

XHRCL-FM is a radio station on 89.5 FM in San Luis Río Colorado, Sonora. The station is known as Variedades FM.

== History ==
XHRCL received its concession in August 1994. It was owned by Ángel Mario Borja Navarrete. In 2000, ownership passed to Grupo ACIR. It carried its La Comadre grupera format when it was owned by ACIR.

ACIR would sell most of its Sonora stations to Radiorama, but XHRCL wound up being operated by Radio Grupo OIR, which controls almost all of the commercial radio stations in San Luis Río Colorado.
