= XEGL-AM =

Radio station in Navojoa, Sonora

- Navojoa, Sonora; Mexico
- Broadcast area: Navojoa, Sonora
- Frequency: 1270 AM
- Branding: La Nuestra Radio

Programming
- Format: Variety

Ownership
- Owner: Renovando la Comunicación, S.A. de C.V.

History
- First air date: November 1940

Technical information
- Licensing authority: CRT
- Class: C
- Power: 1,000 watts daytime (500 watts nighttime)
- Transmitter coordinates: 27°03′49.51″N 109°28′04.33″W

XEGL is a radio station on 1270 AM in Navojoa, Sonora.

== History ==
XEGL received its concession on June 11, 1941, months after coming to air in November 1940. It was owned by Fausto Marco Gómez Cota and transferred to his estate. In 2016, the estate awarded the station to José Raúl Gómez Ballesteros, and in 2018, the transfer of the station to Renovando la Comunicación was approved.

In 2014, as a result of the station's inability to migrate to FM and competition from larger station groups such as Larsa and Uniradio which absorbed most of the local advertising market, operation was taken over by La Verdad, a local newspaper. La Verdad proceeded to start from scratch, firing XEGL's entire air staff. The station eventually changed its name to La Nuestra Radio. Its news programs also air on XHNAS-FM "Toño 95.5" in Navojoa.
