= XHRMO-FM =

Radio station in Hermosillo, Sonora, Mexico

- Hermosillo, Sonora; Mexico
- Frequency: 88.1 FM
- Branding: La Voz del Pitic

Programming
- Format: Cultural

Ownership
- Owner: Democracia y Deliberación Desértica, A.C.

History
- First air date: January 2019
- Call sign meaning: HeRMOsillo

Technical information
- Licensing authority: CRT
- Class: A
- ERP: 610 watts
- HAAT: 221.5 m (727 ft)
- Transmitter coordinates: 29°03′47″N 110°56′30.3″W

Links
- Webcast: Listen live
- Website: lavozdelpitic.com.mx

XHRMO-FM is a noncommercial radio station on 88.1 FM in Hermosillo, Sonora, Mexico. The station is owned by Democracia y Deliberación Desértica, A.C. and features a cultural format known as La Voz del Pitic.

== History ==
XHRMO-FM was one of four stations awarded simultaneously by the IFT in Hermosillo on December 19, 2017, to resolve permit applications filed prior to 2014. Democracia y Deliberación Desértica, A.C., had filed for its station on August 5, 2013. La Voz del Pitic began operations online in August 2018 and began broadcasting on 88.1 FM in January 2019.
