= XHNNO-FM =

Radio station in Naco, Sonora, Mexico, serving Agua Prieta

- Naco, Sonora; Mexico
- Broadcast area: Agua Prieta, Sonora
- Frequency: 99.9 MHz
- Branding: Los 40

Programming
- Format: Top 40 (CHR)
- Affiliations: Radiópolis

Ownership
- Owner: Grupo Radiofónico Zer; (Arnoldo Rodríguez Zermeño)
- Sister stations: XHSAP-FM, XHSOS-FM

History
- First air date: November 23, 1994 (concession)

Technical information
- Licensing authority: CRT
- Class: B
- ERP: 27.4 kW
- HAAT: 150.2 meters (493 ft)
- Transmitter coordinates: 31°16′43.6″N 109°44′54.1″W

Links
- Webcast: Listen live
- Website: grupozer.mx

XHNNO-FM is a radio station in Naco, Sonora, Mexico, serving Agua Prieta, Sonora. Broadcasting on 99.9 FM, XHNNO is owned by Grupo Radiofónico Zer and carries the Los 40 format from Radiópolis.

== History ==
The concession for XHNNO was awarded on November 23, 1994. The station has always been owned by Rodríguez Zermeño.

Until January 2021, the station carried the Exa FM pop format from MVS Radio.

The station began carrying the Los 40 format on February 3, 2021.
