= XHPPO-FM =

Radio station in Puerto Peñasco, Sonora, Mexico

- Puerto Peñasco, Sonora; Mexico
- Frequency: 93.5 MHz
- Branding: La Bestia Grupera

Programming
- Format: Grupera

Ownership
- Owner: Grupo Radiorama; (XHPPO, S.A. de C.V.)
- Operator: Grupo Audiorama Sonora
- Sister stations: XHITA-FM

History
- First air date: October 28, 1994 (concession)
- Former frequencies: 106.1 MHz (1994–2019)
- Call sign meaning: Puerto Peñasco

Technical information
- Licensing authority: CRT
- Class: B
- ERP: 15 kW
- HAAT: −2.8 m (−9.2 ft)
- Transmitter coordinates: 31°18′19.9″N 113°32′12.1″W

Links
- Webcast: www.audioramasonora.mx/LaBestiaGrupera/

XHPPO-FM is a radio station on 93.5 FM in Puerto Peñasco, Sonora, Mexico. It is operated by Grupo Audiorama Sonora and carries its La Bestia Grupera format.

== History ==
XHPPO received its concession on October 28, 1994. The station was owned by Humberto Huesca Bustamante on behalf of Grupo ACIR. ACIR sold many of its stations to Radiorama, XHPPO included, in the late 2000s, with a concession transfer taking place in 2015.

XHPPO had previously been known as Sol FM for most of its history prior to flipping to Los 40. In July 2017, XHPPO and other Audiorama stations ditched Los 40 to take on the company's own Súper brand.

XHPPO moved to 93.5 MHz in October 2019 as a condition of the renewal of its concession, in order to clear 106-108 MHz as much as possible for community and indigenous stations.

XHPPO and Audiorama sister station XHITA-FM 96.5 exchanged formats, with Súper moved to XHITA and the La Bestia Grupera format to XHPPO.
