= XHNAS-FM =

Radio station in Navojoa, Sonora, Mexico

- Navojoa, Sonora; Mexico
- Frequency: 95.5 MHz
- Branding: KY

Programming
- Format: Urban

Ownership
- Owner: Grupo Audiorama Comunicaciones; (XENAS-AM, S.A. de C.V.)

History
- First air date: October 4, 1994 (concession)
- Call sign meaning: "Navojoa, Sonora"

Technical information
- Licensing authority: CRT
- Class: B1
- ERP: 12 kilowatts
- HAAT: 50.2 m (165 ft)
- Transmitter coordinates: 27°04′29″N 109°24′24″W

Links
- Webcast: Listen live
- Website: audiorama.mx

XHNAS-FM is a radio station on 95.5 FM in Navojoa, Sonora, Mexico. It is owned by Grupo Audiorama Comunicaciones and is known as KY (pronounced like "calle") with an urban format.

== History ==
XENAS-AM received its concession on October 4, 1994. It was owned by Grupo Radiorama subsidiary Mensajes Musicales, S.A., and broadcast with 500 watts on 1400 kHz. It later moved to 1100 kHz in order to raise its daytime power to 1,000 watts. It was known as La Poderosa and broadcast grupera and norteña music before flipping to a romantic format as Nova 1100. In 2005, the station adopted the Los 40 Principales pop format from Televisa Radio. In May 2009, Radiorama's only station in Navojoa was leased to Grupo Larsa Comunicaciones, allowing it to switch to grupera under the name La Única.

In 2011, XENAS migrated to FM as XHNAS-FM 95.5. In mid-2013, it switched to pop as Sin Límites. It kept the pop format by returning to Los 40 Principales in early March 2015, which only lasted until August 1, when Larsa debuted its Toño adult hits format on the station.

In mid-2021, Larsa ceased operating XHNAS-FM. It reverted to control of its owner, Grupo Audiorama Comunicaciones (a related company to Radiorama). On October 4, 2021, the station formally relaunched as KY using imaging debuted on Audiorama's XHDK-FM Guadalajara in 2020.

During this time, some news programs from XEGL-AM 1270 "La Nuestra Radio" aired on XHNAS-FM.
