= XHUK-FM =

Radio station in Caborca, Sonora, Mexico

XHUK-FM / XEUK-AM
- Caborca, Sonora; Mexico
- Frequency: 95.3 FM / 570 AM
- Branding: La UK

Programming
- Format: Regional Mexican

Ownership
- Owner: Grupo Radio Palacios; (Radio Palacios, S.A. de C.V.)
- Sister stations: XHCBR-FM, XHEZ-FM

History
- First air date: August 22, 1984 (concession)

Technical information
- Licensing authority: CRT
- Class: AA (FM); C (AM)
- Power: 0.5 kW
- ERP: 6.5 kW
- HAAT: -1.4 m
- Transmitter coordinates: 30°43′31″N 112°09′46″W

Links
- Webcast: Listen Live
- Website: lauk.com.mx

XHUK-FM/XEUK-AM is a radio station in Caborca, Sonora. Broadcasting on 95.3 FM and 570 AM, XHUK is owned by Grupo Radio Palacios and branded as La UK with a Regional Mexican format.

== History ==
XEUK-AM received its concession on August 22, 1984. It was owned by Bernardo Cruz Bedolla and broadcast as a 500-watt daytimer on 1470 kHz. By the 1990s, XEUK was on 570 kHz and had begun nighttime broadcasts with 250 watts.

XEUK was authorized to migrate to FM in 2011, but it was required to maintain its AM station, as communities could lose radio service were the AM station to go off the air.
