= XECB-AM =

Radio station in San Luis Río Colorado, Sonora, Mexico

Simulcast with XHDY-FM 107.1
- San Luis Río Colorado, Sonora; Mexico
- Frequency: 1460 AM
- Branding: Radio Ranchito

Programming
- Language: Spanish
- Format: Regional Mexican

Ownership
- Owner: Radio Grupo OIR Sonora; (Radio Impulsora de San Luis, S.A. de C.V.)
- Sister stations: XHLBL-FM, XHSLR-FM, XHLPS-FM, XHRCL-FM, XHMIX-FM, XHEMW-FM

History
- First air date: October 20, 1950
- Call sign meaning: Carlos Blando, (original concessionaire)

Technical information
- Licensing authority: CRT
- Class: B
- Power: 10,000 watts day/250 watts night
- Transmitter coordinates: 32°27′39″N 114°49′01″W

Links
- Webcast: Listen live
- Website: radiogrupooir.com/ranchito

XECB-AM is a radio station on 1460 AM in San Luis Río Colorado, Sonora. It is owned by Radio Grupo OIR Sonora and is known as Radio Ranchito, carrying a Regional Mexican format.

== History ==
XECB-AM logo until 2018 as AM-only station.

XECB received its concession on October 20, 1950. It broadcast on 1450 kHz and was owned by and named for Carlos Blando, a radio pioneer from Mexicali, Baja California. The 250-watt station upgraded power to 1,000 watts by the 1980s and was sold to its current concessionaire in 1994.

On November 13, 2002, XECB was moved to 1460 kHz and increased power with 10,000 watts during the day and 250 watts at night.
