= XHSOS-FM =

Radio station in Agua Prieta, Sonora, Mexico

XESOS-AM/XHSOS-FM
- El Sifón, Agua Prieta, Sonora; Mexico
- Frequencies: 730 kHz; 97.3 MHz
- Branding: La Ranchera

Programming
- Format: Regional Mexican

Ownership
- Owner: Grupo Radiofónico ZER; (Arnoldo Rodríguez Zermeño)
- Sister stations: XHSAP-FM, XHNNO-FM

History
- First air date: 1941
- Former call signs: XETM-AM (1941–2000)
- Former frequencies: 1350 kHz (1941–2000); 670 kHz (2000–2003)
- Call sign meaning: "Sonora El Sifón"

Technical information
- Licensing authority: CRT
- Class: B1 (FM); B (AM)
- Power: 2,000 kW (daytime) (AM)
- ERP: 25 kW (FM)
- HAAT: 68.7 m (225 ft)

Links
- Website: grupozer.net/radios.php?estacion=26

XESOS-AM 730/XHSOS-FM 97.3 is a radio station in Agua Prieta Municipality, Sonora, Mexico. It is owned by Grupo Radiofónico ZER and airs a Regional Mexican format as La Ranchera.

== History ==
The history of XHSOS begins on the AM band, with a station licensed to Naco. XETM-AM on 1350 kHz was awarded to Jesús Manuel Franco Martínez on March 19, 1941. The station was originally licensed for operation at 1 kW day and night.

Francisco Ernesto Ruiz, who would go on to become the Spanish radio play-by-play voice of the Houston Astros, was a disc jockey at XETM from 1972 to 1981.

In 2000, XETM was sold to Arnoldo Rodríguez Zermeño, founder of Grupo Radiofónico ZER. Zermeño moved the station to El Sifón (with studios in Agua Prieta), changed its callsign to XESOS-AM and increased its power to 50 kW daytime on 670 kHz. In 2003, after the United States Federal Communications Commission complained about interference to other stations on 670, Mexico moved XESOS to 730 kHz at 300 watts of power.

The AM-FM migration saw XESOS become XHSOS-FM 97.3 with 25 kW of effective radiated power.
