= XHPJOA-FM =

Radio station in Navojoa, Sonora

XHPJOA-FM/XHPUAY-FM
- Navojoa, Sonora Guaymas, Sonora; Mexico
- Frequencies: 98.1 MHz; 90.9 MHz (HD Radio)
- Branding: Pop Extremo

Programming
- Format: Pop

Ownership
- Owner: Expreso; (Medios y Editorial de Sonora, S.A. de C.V.)
- Sister stations: XHPMAS-FM/XHPNAV-FM "Sonora Grupera"

History
- First air date: 2018
- Call sign meaning: NavoJOA; GUAYmas

Technical information
- Licensing authority: CRT
- Class: AA, B1
- ERP: XHPJOA: 1,036 watts XHPUAY: 1,503 watts
- HAAT: XHPJOA: 298.3 m (979 ft); XHPUAY: 462.1 m (1,516 ft)
- Transmitter coordinates: 27°04′59.7″N 109°17′21.4″W; 27°56′29.7″N 110°54′19″W

Links
- Website: popextremo.com

XHPJOA-FM and XHPUAY-FM are radio stations broadcasting on 98.1 FM in Navojoa, Sonora and 90.9 FM in Guaymas, Sonora, owned by the Expreso newspaper. The stations form a simulcast known as Pop Extremo, carrying a pop format.

XHPJOA transmits from a tower atop Cerro Prieto, while XHPUAY broadcasts from Cerro El Vigía.

== History ==
Medios y Editorial de Sonora initially won two stations, one each in Guaymas and Navojoa, in the IFT-4 station auction of 2017. This included XHPJOA, which cost 6.5 million pesos. XHPUAY was subsequently won after the initial winning bidder for the frequency dropped out, with a winning bid of 12 million pesos.

The stations signed on at the end of August 2018 in a simulcast.
