= XHEZ-FM =

Radio station in Caborca, Sonora

- Caborca, Sonora; Mexico
- Frequency: 90.7 FM (HD Radio)
- Branding: La Gran Zeta

Programming
- Format: Regional Mexican

Ownership
- Owner: Grupo Radio Palacios; (Radio Palacios, S.A. de C.V.)
- Sister stations: XHCBR-FM, XHUK-FM

History
- First air date: December 20, 1957 (concession)

Technical information
- Licensing authority: CRT
- Class: AA
- ERP: 6 kW
- HAAT: 64.1 m (210 ft)
- Transmitter coordinates: 30°43′31″N 112°09′46″W

Links
- Webcast: Listen Live
- Website: www.lagranzeta.com.mx

XHEZ-FM (branded as La Gran Zeta) is a Regional Mexican radio station in Caborca, Sonora.

== History ==
XEEZ-AM 970 received its concession on December 20, 1957. It was owned by José de Jesús Palacios Lares, and upon his death, ownership transferred to his widow, Josefina Enciso Vda. de Palacios. In 2006, ownership was placed in a company controlled by members of the Palacios family.

On October 19, 2011, XEEZ was authorized to move to FM as XHEZ-FM 90.7, sharing a tower with co-owned XHCBR-FM 100.1.
