= XHHER-FM =

Radio station in Hermosillo, Sonora

- Hermosillo, Sonora; Mexico
- Frequency: 105.9 MHz
- Branding: Click FM

Ownership
- Owner: Organiden, A.C.
- Sister stations: XHGYM-FM

History
- First air date: October 2018
- Call sign meaning: Hermosillo

Technical information
- Licensing authority: CRT
- Class: A
- ERP: 750 watts
- HAAT: 219.7 m (721 ft)
- Transmitter coordinates: 29°03′48″N 110°56′17″W

XHHER-FM is a noncommercial radio station on 105.9 FM in Hermosillo, Sonora, Mexico. The concession for XHHER-FM is owned by Organiden, A.C., a civil association.

== History ==
XHHER-FM was one of four stations awarded simultaneously by the IFT in Hermosillo on December 19, 2017, to resolve permit applications filed prior to 2014. Organiden, A.C., had filed for its station on August 30, 2013. In the IFT's resolution clearing these applications, it was stated that Organiden was related with entities that owned two commercial radio stations. In early 2018, the other Organiden station, XHGYM-FM Guaymas, signed on. However, when the station signed on, it was operated by Larsa with the romantic format jettisoned two months earlier by XHVSS-FM 101.1. When Larsa ceased local operations of XHYF-FM, many talk programs migrated to XHHER.

Effective July 31, 2019, the XHVSS grupera format "La Más Chingona" moved wholesale from 101.1 to 105.9, resulting in the cancellation of the romantic format and many of the programs that had moved. This came days after Larsa announced, then retracted, plans to move the Toño format from XHESON-FM to XHHER. In November, Larsa reversed course and flipped XHHER-FM to Toño. Larsa continued to operate XHHER-FM until April 25, 2023, when it abruptly dropped all Larsa programming and began branding as "Organiden 105.9". The station then went silent on May 1, due to change in location. The station returned to air in April 2024.
