= XEXN-AM =

Radio station in Ures, Sonora

- Ures, Sonora; Mexico
- Frequency: 1010 kHz
- Branding: Radio Ures

Ownership
- Owner: Sucesión de Francisco Vidal Esquer

History
- First air date: November 25, 1969

Technical information
- Licensing authority: CRT
- Class: C
- Power: 500 watts day/200 watts night

Links
- Website: www.radioures.com.mx

XEXN-AM is a radio station on 1010 AM in Ures, Sonora, Mexico. It is owned by the successors of Francisco Vidal Esquer and known as Radio Ures.

== History ==
XEXN received its concession on November 25, 1969.

In 2019, Grupo Larsa Comunicaciones began operating the station with its Toño format, ending 50 years as Radio Ures. And dropped Toño and resuming to return to Radio Ures.
