= XHVS-FM =

Radio station in Hermosillo, Sonora

XEVS-AM/XHVS-FM
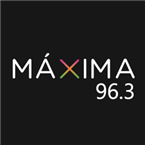
- Hermosillo, Sonora; Mexico
- Broadcast area: Hermosillo, Sonora
- Frequencies: 1110 kHz (silent); 96.3 MHz
- Branding: Máxima

Programming
- Format: Adult contemporary

Ownership
- Owner: Radio S.A.; (Carlos de Jesús Quiñones Armendáriz)
- Sister stations: XHEDL-FM, XHEPB-FM, XHMMO-FM

History
- First air date: August 24, 1960 (concession); 1994 (FM)
- Call sign meaning: Villa de Seris (original transmitter location)

Technical information
- Class: A (FM); C (AM)
- Power: 1 kW day/0.25 kW night
- ERP: 3 kW

Links
- Webcast: Listen live
- Website: maxplay.com.mx

XHVS-FM 96.3 is a combo radio station in Hermosillo, Sonora. It carries the Máxima adult contemporary format from its owner, Radio S.A.

== History ==
The concession for XEVS-AM 1110 was awarded to Francisco Vidal Moreno in 1960, with an original transmitter location of Villa de Seris, a neighborhood of Hermosillo. Vidal Moreno had previously built and signed on XEDL-AM in the 1940s. In 1994, XEVS was authorized to add an FM station, XHVS-FM 89.7 (later 96.3) and become an AM-FM combo.

After Vidal's death, his estate sold its radio stations to Radio S.A.

XEVS discontinued AM broadcasts in 2017, but the station never formally surrendered its AM authorization.
