= XHUSS-FM =

Radio station in Hermosillo, Sonora, Mexico

- Hermosillo, Sonora; Mexico
- Frequency: 92.3 FM
- Branding: Suave

Programming
- Format: Romantic

Ownership
- Owner: Bura Grupo Multimedia; (CRNM Corporativo Radiofónico del Noroeste de México, S.A. de C.V.)
- Sister stations: XHHQ-FM, XHFEM-FM

History
- First air date: August 16, 1994
- Call sign meaning: From Ures, Sonora, the original location of the station

Technical information
- Licensing authority: CRT
- Class: C1
- ERP: 50 kWs
- HAAT: 238.5 m (782 ft)
- Transmitter coordinates: 29°03′41″N 110°56′28″W

Links
- Webcast: Listen live
- Website: www.suaveoficial.com

XHUSS-FM is a radio station on 92.3 FM in Hermosillo, Sonora, Mexico. The station is owned by Bura Grupo Multimedia and carries a romantic format known as Suave.

== History ==
XHUSS was originally located in Ures, Sonora on 95.1 MHz. It received its concession on August 16, 1994 and was owned by Jorge Torio Castellanos. It moved to Hermosillo in the late 1990s and changed frequencies to 92.3 MHz.

Grupo ACIR operated this station with its Amor romantic format until January 2024, when it was sold to Bura Grupo Multimedia. Bura kept the format but rebranded it as Suave ("Soft").
