= XHSM-FM =

Radio station in Ciudad Obregón, Sonora

- Ciudad Obregón, Sonora; Mexico
- Frequency: 100.9 FM
- Branding: La Poderosa

Programming
- Format: Grupera

Ownership
- Owner: Grupo AS Comunicación; (XHSM-FM, S.A. de C.V.)
- Sister stations: XHIQ-FM

History
- First air date: November 28, 1988 (concession)

Technical information
- Licensing authority: CRT
- Class: B1
- ERP: 13.37 kW
- HAAT: 44.8 m (147 ft)

XHSM-FM is a radio station in Ciudad Obregón, Sonora. Broadcasting on 100.9 FM, XHSM is owned by Grupo AS Comunicacion and carries a grupera format known as La Poderosa.

== History ==
XHSM received its concession on November 28, 1988. It was owned by Sociedad de Radiodifusión y Televisión, S.A., a subsidiary of Radiorama, and broadcast a Spanish-language contemporary format branded as Estereo Vida. In mid-2000s, Radio S.A. operated the station, which became Máxima FM with a pop and rock format. Radiorama resumed running the station in late 2007 and flipped it to a franchise of the Los 40 Principales pop format.

In May 2009, all Radiorama stations in Ciudad Obregón were leased to Grupo Larsa Comunicaciones, with the station rebranded as Sin Límites but retaining its pop format. In August 2019, XHSM went silent as Larsa ceased its operations in Ciudad Obregón, affecting three stations. In November, Radiorama took over direct operation of XHSM and XHIQ-FM 102.5, with XHSM flipping to grupera as La Poderosa.
