= XEDJ-AM =

Former radio station in Magdalena de Kino, Sonora

Magdalena de Kino, Sonora, Mexico; Mexico
- Broadcast area: Magdalena de Kino, Sonora
- Frequency: 1450 AM
- Branding: Radio Clave

Ownership
- Owner: Jesús L. Rochín

History
- First air date: January 10, 1947
- Last air date: 2004 or 2007

Technical information
- Power: 500 watts

XEDJ-AM was a radio station broadcasting on 1450 AM in Magdalena de Kino, Sonora. It was owned by Jesús Lara Rochín and last branded as Radio Clave.

== History ==
Jesús Rochín was the only owner of XEDJ. He received its concession on January 8, 1947, and the station came to air two days later. When XEDJ came to air, it broadcast with 250 watts during the day and 100 at night. By the early 1980s, this had increased to 500 watts, a power level that remained for the rest of the station's life. On two occasions, members of the Rochín Durazo family served as municipal president of Magdalena. Programs and special content over the years included broadcasting the Moon landing to Magdalena and baseball coverage from the Liga Norte de Sonora.

Its most famous station employee was one Luis Donaldo Colosio, who worked as a part-time and backup announcer for two years.

In 2004, XEDJ went off the air due to legal problems, though some sources say 2007. The concession expired on January 8, 2017.
