= XHAB-FM =

Radio station in Santa Ana, Sonora

- Santa Ana, Sonora; Mexico
- Frequency: 98.7 FM
- Branding: La Raza

Ownership
- Owner: Radio S.A.; (Carlos de Jesús Quiñones Armendáriz)

History
- First air date: December 12, 1947
- Former call signs: XEAB-AM
- Former frequencies: 1400 AM

Technical information
- Class: A
- ERP: 6 kW
- Transmitter coordinates: 30°32′50″N 111°07′19″W

XHAB-FM is a radio station in Santa Ana, Sonora, Mexico.

== History ==
XEAB-AM 1400 hit the air on December 12, 1947, known as "Las Cuatro Iniciales de Oro de Santa Ana". The 250-watt station was owned by Alfredo Marín Castro and had received its concession the previous August. By the 1980s, XEAB was broadcasting with 500 watts (later reduced to 250 again).

In November 1989, XEAB was transferred to 15 members of the Marín family: Guadalupe and Luis Alfredo Marín Méndez; Leticia, Rubén, Griselda, and Jackeline (Note: Listed by the SCT as Jacqueline) Marín Yescas; Yolanda, Gilberto and Eduardo Marín González; Elisa Marín Martínez de Gutiérrez; Aurora Yescas; Micaela Méndez Alvarez; Eloisa Martínez Arvizu; and Adolfo and Leopoldo Marín Martínez. In 2006, the Marín successors were cleared to sell XEAB to Radio S.A.

In 2011, Radio S.A. was approved to migrate XEAB from the AM band to the FM band as XHAB-FM 98.7. However, XEAB has been mired in the same labor problems affecting Radio S.A. in Hermosillo, including several strikes, as well as technical problems with its AM and FM transmitters.
