= WORM (AM) =

- Savannah, Tennessee; United States
- Frequency: 1010 kHz

Programming
- Format: Oldies

Ownership
- Owner: Gerald W. Hunt
- Sister stations: WORM-FM

Technical information
- Licensing authority: FCC
- Facility ID: 24100
- Class: D
- Power: 250 watts day 27 watts night
- Transmitter coordinates: 35°14′24.00″N 88°14′29.00″W

Links
- Public license information: Public file; LMS

WORM (1010 AM, Savannah's Pure Gold Station) is a radio station broadcasting an oldies music format. Licensed to Savannah, Tennessee, United States, the station is currently owned by Gerald W. Hunt.
