= XHXW-FM =

Radio station in Nogales, Sonora, Mexico

- Nogales, Sonora; Mexico
- Frequency: 90.3 FM (HD Radio)
- Branding: KY

Programming
- Format: Urban music

Ownership
- Owner: Grupo Audiorama Comunicaciones; (Radio 13, S.A.)
- Sister stations: XHRZ-FM

History
- First air date: April 11, 1955; 2019 (FM)
- Former call signs: XEXW-AM

Technical information
- Licensing authority: CRT
- Class: A
- ERP: 3 kW
- HAAT: 56.7 m (186 ft)
- Transmitter coordinates: 31°18′59.2″N 110°57′54.4″W

Links
- Webcast: Listen live
- Website: audiorama.mx

XHXW-FM is a radio station on 90.3 FM in Nogales, Sonora, Mexico. It is owned by Grupo Audiorama Comunicaciones and is known as KY (pronounced like "calle") with an urban music format.

== History ==
Roque Chávez Castro received the concession for XEXW-AM on January 21, 1955; it signed on nearly three months later, on April 11. Chávez Castro, who primarily operated radio stations in Sinaloa, sold the station in 1977. Eventually, XEXW became a Radiorama-owned station and was spun off to Larsa when Radiorama exited many Sonora markets.

On May 10, 2019, XEXW became the last AM station in Nogales to move to FM (Since the XENY-AM frequency was not migrated to FM) as XHXW-FM 90.3, changing to the La Más Chingona brand already used by Larsa in Hermosillo and Ciudad Obregón. Six months later, in November, it changed to pop under the "Sin Límites" banner.

This station reverted to Radiorama control, until October 4, 2021, the station formally launched as KY 90.3, a brand new music format, based in XHDK-FM on Guadalajara.
