= XHEMW-FM =

Radio station in San Luis Río Colorado, Sonora, Mexico

- San Luis Río Colorado, Sonora; Mexico
- Frequencies: 1260 kHz; 91.1 MHz (HD Radio)
- Branding: Río Digital

Programming
- Format: English and Spanish Variety hits

Ownership
- Owner: Radio Grupo OIR Sonora; (Radio Impulsora de San Luis, S.A. de C.V.)
- Sister stations: XECB-AM, XHDY-FM, XHLBL-FM, XHSLR-FM, XHMIX-FM, XHRCL-FM, XHLPS-FM

History
- First air date: January 20, 1962 (concession)

Technical information
- Licensing authority: CRT
- Class: A (FM); C (AM)
- Power: AM: 1,000 watts day/250 watts night
- ERP: FM: 2,000 watts
- HAAT: FM: 30.6 m (100 ft)
- Transmitter coordinates: 32°27′39″N 114°49′01″W

XEMW-AM/XHEMW-FM is a combo radio station on 1260 AM and 91.1 FM in San Luis Río Colorado, Sonora, Mexico. It is owned by Radio Grupo OIR Sonora and is known as Río Digital with a Variety hits format.

== History ==
Logo used as Sonido Zeta

XEMW received its concession on January 20, 1962. It was owned by Francisco González Magallanes and originally broadcast on 1270 kHz as a 1,000-watt daytimer.

On February 1, 1978, the concession was transferred to XEMW, S.A. de C.V. The station had moved to 1260 by the late 1980s, which allowed it to begin nighttime service. Through 2018, XEMW was known as Sonido Zeta with Regional Mexican music.

Upon second-wave AM-FM migration of XEMW and XELBL, a format shuffle brought XELBL's romantic format to the new XHEMW-FM 91.1. In February 2019, XHEMW and XHLBL swapped formats, with Radio Centro moving to 93.9 and Río Digital to 91.1.
