= XHLPS-FM =

Radio station in San Luis Río Colorado, Sonora, Mexico

- San Luis Río Colorado, Sonora; Mexico
- Frequency: 102.5 MHz
- Branding: Fuerza Latina

Programming
- Format: Grupera

Ownership
- Owner: Radiorama; (XHLPS, FM, S.A. de C.V.)
- Operator: Organización Impulsora de Radio Sonora
- Sister stations: XECB-AM, XHSLR-FM, XHLBL-FM, XHRCL-FM, XHMIX-FM, XHEMW-FM, XHDY-FM

History
- First air date: October 21, 1994 (concession)

Technical information
- Licensing authority: CRT
- Class: B
- ERP: 3 kW
- HAAT: 48.9 m (160 ft)
- Transmitter coordinates: 32.684288°N 114.757276°W

XHLPS-FM (102.5 FM) is a radio station in San Luis Río Colorado, Sonora, Mexico, with a transmitter 25 kilometres (16 mi) away at Colonia Ladrillera, in Mexicali Municipality, Baja California. The station is operated by OIR Sonora, a company owned by members of the Aguirre family but separate from Grupo Radio Centro, and is known as Fuerza Latina.

== History ==
The station's concession was awarded on October 21, 1994. XHLPS was originally owned by Humberto Aréchiga Espinoza, from a family with prolific broadcasting interests in Baja California Sur, and operated by Radio Grupo OIR, the dominant broadcaster in San Luis. By the late 2000s, it was known as Radio Río Digital.

In 2003, XHLPS was cleared to put in place its modern technical facilities. The tower in Colonia Ladrillera is further north than those of all other stations in San Luis Río Colorado, Sonora, Mexico, approximately 1.35 kilometres (0.84 mi) from the international border and closer to Yuma, Arizona.

In 2011, XHLPS was sold to its current concessionaire, a Radiorama subsidiary.
