= WMOX =

Coordinates: 32°23′42″N 88°39′28″W

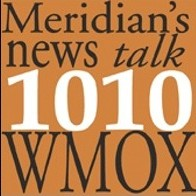
- Meridian, Mississippi; United States
- Broadcast area: Meridian, Mississippi
- Frequency: 1010 kHz

Programming
- Format: Talk radio
- Affiliations: WTOK-TV

Ownership
- Owner: Magnolia State Broadcasting, Inc.

History
- First air date: March 8, 1946

Technical information
- Licensing authority: FCC
- Facility ID: 7073
- Class: B
- Power: 10,000 watts (day); 1,000 watts (night)

Links
- Public license information: Public file; LMS
- Website: wmox.net

WMOX (1010 AM) is a radio station broadcasting in the Meridian, Mississippi, Arbitron market. The station carries a News/Talk format.

The station's license was cancelled by the Federal Communications Commission on June 2, 2020 for failure to file a license renewal application. The license was reinstated on August 6.
