= XHHO-FM =

Radio station in Ciudad Obregón, Sonora, Mexico

- Ciudad Obregón, Sonora; Mexico
- Frequency: 97.7 FM
- Branding: Máxima

Programming
- Format: Pop

Ownership
- Owner: Radio S.A.; (XEHO de Obregón, S.A. de C.V.)
- Sister stations: XHGON-FM

History
- First air date: March 2, 1959 (concession)

Technical information
- Licensing authority: CRT
- Class: B1
- ERP: 25 kW
- Transmitter coordinates: 27°34′31″N 109°56′28″W

Links
- Webcast: Listen live
- Website: maxplay.com.mx

XHHO-FM is a radio station on 97.7 FM in Ciudad Obregón, Sonora, Mexico. It is owned by Radio S.A. and carries its Máxima format.

== History ==
XEHO-AM 910 received its concession on February 7, 1957. It was owned by Josefina María de García de León and broadcast with 1,000 watts day and 250 night. XEHO was bought by Radio Son, S.A. (in 1972), Sistemas Publicitarios y de Mercadotecnia de Obregón, S.A. de C.V. (in 1992), and Fantasía Musical 58, S.A. de C.V. (in 2004). By the time of the latter acquisition, XEHO had moved to 580 kHz.

The current concessionaire was created in 2011, the same year that XEHO was cleared to move to FM as XHHO-FM 97.7.

Unionized workers at XHHO-FM Máxima 97.7 are also joining the protest against the situation at the company.

As part of their demonstration, the station has been playing just one song throughout its programming: “Happy” by Pharrell Williams, replacing its regular music rotation with the popular hit.

The protest is endorsed by the Mexican Republic's Union of Workers in the Broadcasting, Television, Telecommunications, Related and Allied Industries (STIRTT).

This measure will remain in effect until an agreement is reached with the owners of Radio, S.A.
