= XHYF-FM =

Radio station in Hermosillo, Sonora, Mexico

- Hermosillo, Sonora; Mexico
- Frequency: 91.5 MHz
- Branding: Radio Fórmula

Programming
- Format: News/talk

Ownership
- Owner: Grupo Fórmula Sonora; (Transmisora Regional Radio Fórmula, S.A. de C.V.)
- Sister stations: XHEHF-FM Nogales

History
- First air date: June 11, 1993 (concession)
- Former call signs: XEYF-AM
- Former frequencies: 1200 kHz

Technical information
- Licensing authority: CRT
- Class: B1
- ERP: 25 kW
- HAAT: 8.9 m (29 ft)
- Transmitter coordinates: 29°04′28.8″N 110°59′0.06″W

Links
- Website: www.radioformula.com.mx/sonora/

XHYF-FM is a radio station in Hermosillo, Sonora, Mexico. Broadcasting on 91.5 FM, XHYF is owned by Radio Fórmula.

== History ==
XEYF-AM 1200 received its concession on June 11, 1993. It was a daytime-only station owned by Grupo Radiorama subsidiary Radio Universo, S.A., until its 2006 sale to Radio Fórmula. It migrated to FM in 2011.

Between the early 2010s and May 2019, Grupo Larsa Comunicaciones sold ad time and added some local programming to XHYF and XEHF-AM/XHEHF-FM in Nogales in an operating agreement with Radio Fórmula. That agreement ended May 10, 2019, and on May 13, a newscast from the Expreso newspaper began to air on the stations instead as that newspaper took over local operations. Much of the displaced Larsa programming moved to XHHER-FM 105.9. Expreso continued to represent XHYF and XHEHF through the end of 2021.
