= XHFEM-FM =

Radio station in Hermosillo, Sonora, Mexico

- Hermosillo, Sonora; Mexico
- Frequency: 99.5 FM
- Branding: BFM (Best Pop)

Programming
- Format: Pop

Ownership
- Owner: Grupo ACIR; (Radio XHFEM, S. de R.L. de C.V.)
- Operator: Bura Grupo Multimedia
- Sister stations: XHHQ-FM, XHUSS-FM

History
- First air date: March 23, 1988 (concession)

Technical information
- Licensing authority: CRT
- Class: B1
- ERP: 3 kW
- HAAT: 244 m (801 ft)
- Transmitter coordinates: 29°03′41″N 110°56′28″W

Links
- Webcast: Listen live
- Website: www.boficial.com

XHFEM-FM is a radio station in Hermosillo, Sonora, Mexico. Broadcasting on 99.5 FM, XHFEM is owned by Grupo ACIR but operated by Bura Grupo Multimedia and carries a pop format known as BFM Best Pop.

== History ==
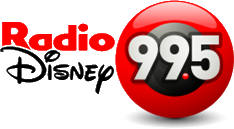
Logo as Radio Disney used from April 14, 2014 until December 25, 2019

XEYH-AM 1170 received its concession on March 23, 1988. It was owned by Proyección Radiofónica de Calidad, S.A. de C.V., a company of Juan José Espejo. By the early 2000s, the station had changed its callsign to XEFEM-AM under ACIR ownership. It migrated to FM in 2011.

On December 25, 2019, Disney and ACIR announced they were mutually ending their relationship, which had covered twelve Mexican cities. Ten of the twelve Radio Disney stations, including XHFEM, were transitioned to ACIR's replacement pop format, Match.

Grupo ACIR operated this station until January 2024, when it was sold to Bura Grupo Multimedia. Bura kept the format but rebranded it as BFM.
