= XHIQ-FM =

Radio station in Ciudad Obregón, Sonora, Mexico

- Ciudad Obregón, Sonora; Mexico
- Frequency: 102.5 FM
- Branding: Oreja FM

Programming
- Format: Spanish adult hits

Ownership
- Owner: Grupo AS Comunicación; (Ingenio Radiofónico, S.A. de C.V.)
- Sister stations: XHSM-FM

History
- First air date: April 9, 1958 (concession)
- Former call signs: XEIQ-AM
- Former frequencies: 960 kHz

Technical information
- Licensing authority: CRT
- Class: B1
- ERP: 25 kW
- HAAT: 39.08 m (128.2 ft)
- Transmitter coordinates: 27°30′47″N 109°57′05″W

Links
- Webcast: Listen live
- Website: orejafm.com

XHIQ-FM is a radio station on 102.5 FM in Ciudad Obregón, Sonora, Mexico. The station is owned by Grupo AS Comunicación and known as Oreja FM with a Spanish adult hits format.

== History ==
XEIQ-AM 960 received its concession on April 9, 1958. It was owned by Jesús Corral Ruiz and eventually was bought by Grupo ACIR. ACIR downsized and sold many of its stations to Radiorama, which in turn sold many of its Sonora outlets to Grupo Larsa. (ACIR remains the concessionaire)

In April 2012, XEIQ was cleared to move to FM as XHIQ-FM 102.5.

In August 2019, XHIQ went silent as Larsa ceased its own operations in Ciudad Obregón, affecting three stations. In November, Radiorama took over direct operation of XHIQ and XHSM-FM 100.9, with XHIQ remaining in the Spanish adult hits format, but going by a new name, "Madre 102.5". The station changed brands to Oreja FM in June 2020.
