= XHSAP-FM =

Radio station in Agua Prieta, Sonora

- Agua Prieta, Sonora; Mexico
- Frequency: 98.5 FM
- Branding: La Tremenda

Programming
- Format: Grupera

Ownership
- Owner: Grupo Radiofónico ZER; (Arnoldo Rodríguez Zermeño)
- Sister stations: XHNNO-FM, XHSOS-FM

History
- First air date: August 31, 1993 (concession)
- Call sign meaning: Sonora Agua Prieta

Technical information
- Licensing authority: CRT
- Class: A
- ERP: 3 kW
- HAAT: −8.9 m (−29 ft)

Links
- Webcast: XHSAP-FM

XHSAP-FM is a radio station in Agua Prieta, Sonora. Broadcasting on 98.5 FM, XHSAP is owned by Grupo Radiofónico ZER and is known as La Tremenda.

== History ==
The concession for XHSAP was awarded on August 31, 1993. The station has always been owned by Zermeño.
