= XHITA-FM =

Radio station in Sonoyta–Puerto Peñasco, Sonora

- Sonoyta, Sonora; Mexico
- Broadcast area: Puerto Peñasco, Sonora
- Frequency: 96.5 FM
- Branding: Super

Programming
- Format: Pop

Ownership
- Owner: Grupo Radiofónico ZER; (Arnoldo Rodríguez Zermeño)
- Operator: Grupo Audiorama Sonora
- Sister stations: XHPPO-FM

History
- First air date: November 10, 1988 (concession)
- Call sign meaning: Last three letters of Sonoita

Technical information
- Licensing authority: CRT
- Class: B
- ERP: 40.56 kW
- HAAT: 177.9 m (584 ft)
- Transmitter coordinates: 31°43′43.0″N 113°14′09.0″W

Links
- Website: www.audioramasonora.mx/super/

XHITA-FM is a radio station on 96.5 FM in Sonoyta, Sonora, Mexico serving Puerto Peñasco, Sonora. The station is owned by Grupo Radiofónico ZER, operated by Grupo Audiorama, and known as Súper with a Pop format.

== History ==
XHITA received its concession on November 10, 1988.

XHITA is owned by ZER and used to be known as La Tremenda. It is now operated by Audiorama.

XHITA and Audiorama sister station XHPPO-FM 93.5 exchanged formats, with La Bestia Grupera moving to XHPPO and the Súper format to XHITA.
