= XHHQ-FM =

Radio station in Hermosillo, Sonora, Mexico

- Hermosillo, Sonora; Mexico
- Frequency: 97.1 MHz
- Branding: La Número Uno

Programming
- Format: Grupera

Ownership
- Owner: Bura Grupo Multimedia; (CRNM Corporativo Radiofónico del Noroeste de México, S.A. de C.V.)
- Sister stations: XHUSS-FM, XHFEM-FM

History
- First air date: July 29, 1942 (concession)

Technical information
- Licensing authority: CRT
- Class: C1
- ERP: 25 kW
- HAAT: 226.9 m (744 ft)
- Transmitter coordinates: 29°07′46.7″N 110°56′14.38″W

Links
- Webcast: Listen live
- Website: losnumerouno.com

XHHQ-FM is a radio station on 97.1 FM in Hermosillo, Sonora, Mexico. The station is owned by Bura Grupo Multimedia and carries a grupera format known as La Número Uno.

== History ==
XEHQ-AM 590 received its concession on July 29, 1942, owned by Radio Hermosillo, S. de R.L. In the 2000s, XEHQ moved to 920 kHz (switching frequencies with XEBH) and was sold to Capital Media. The station migrated to FM in 2011.

In December 2017, operation of the station passed from Corporativo Radiofónico del Noroeste to Grupo Larsa Comunicaciones, bringing its Hermosillo station count to four. The relationship between the two ended by August, when Larsa flipped competing station XHVSS-FM to grupera as "La Más Chingona".

On August 22, 2018, the IFT approved the transfer of the station's concession from Capital Media to Corporativo Radiofónico del Noroeste de México, S.A. de C.V.
