= XHSD-FM (Sonora) =

Radio station in Hermosillo, Sonora, Mexico

- Hermosillo, Sonora; Mexico
- Frequency: 100.3 MHz
- Branding: Stereo 100.3

Programming
- Format: Classic hits

Ownership
- Owner: Uniradio; (Radiodifusora XHSD, S.A. de C.V.)
- Sister stations: XHDM-FM, XHHOS-FM

History
- First air date: September 12, 1978 (concession)

Technical information
- Licensing authority: CRT
- Class: B
- ERP: 9,800 watts
- HAAT: 128.8 m (423 ft)

Links
- Website: www.uniradionoticias.com/stereo100/inicio

XHSD-FM is a radio station in Hermosillo, Sonora. Broadcasting on 100.3 FM, XHSD is owned by Uniradio and carries a classic hits format known as Stereo 100.3.
