= Bacerac =

Town in Sonora, Mexico

Coordinates: 30°21′N 108°55′W

Bacerac is a town in Bacerac Municipality in the Mexican state of Sonora.

== Geography ==
Bacerac is situated in the northeast of the state and the municipality has boundaries with Bavispe Municipality in the north, with Huachinera in the south, with the state of Chihuahua in the east, and with the municipalities of Nacozari de García and Villa Hidalgo in the west. The municipal seat lies at an elevation of 1,432 meters above sea level.

The area of the municipality is 1,275.8 km^{2}.

=== Climate ===
Climate data for Bacerac (1991–2020 normals, extremes 1978–present)
Month	Jan	Feb	Mar	Apr	May	Jun	Jul	Aug	Sep	Oct	Nov	Dec	Year
Record high °C (°F)	31 (88)	34 (93)	39 (102)	42 (108)	45 (113)	50 (122)	49 (120)	48 (118)	44 (111)	43 (109)	50 (122)	33 (91)	50 (122)
Mean daily maximum °C (°F)	19.8 (67.6)	22.0 (71.6)	26.1 (79.0)	30.3 (86.5)	35.0 (95.0)	39.6 (103.3)	37.3 (99.1)	36.4 (97.5)	35.0 (95.0)	30.9 (87.6)	24.6 (76.3)	19.5 (67.1)	29.7 (85.5)
Daily mean °C (°F)	10.9 (51.6)	12.7 (54.9)	15.9 (60.6)	19.6 (67.3)	24.3 (75.7)	29.2 (84.6)	28.5 (83.3)	27.5 (81.5)	25.7 (78.3)	20.8 (69.4)	14.7 (58.5)	10.8 (51.4)	20.0 (68.0)
Mean daily minimum °C (°F)	2.0 (35.6)	3.5 (38.3)	5.7 (42.3)	8.9 (48.0)	13.6 (56.5)	18.8 (65.8)	19.7 (67.5)	18.7 (65.7)	16.4 (61.5)	10.7 (51.3)	4.9 (40.8)	2.2 (36.0)	10.4 (50.7)
Record low °C (°F)	−9 (16)	−11 (12)	−5 (23)	−4 (25)	4 (39)	9 (48)	9 (48)	6 (43)	7 (45)	−2 (28)	−9 (16)	−14 (7)	−14 (7)
Average precipitation mm (inches)	25.4 (1.00)	26.2 (1.03)	13.9 (0.55)	6.1 (0.24)	3.5 (0.14)	27.7 (1.09)	117.9 (4.64)	98.7 (3.89)	46.0 (1.81)	25.7 (1.01)	29.1 (1.15)	38.3 (1.51)	458.5 (18.05)
Average rainy days	4.5	4.4	2.9	1.4	1.2	4.1	15.3	12.1	6.1	3.7	3.3	4.2	63.2
Source: Servicio Meteorológico Nacional

== Population ==
The total population was 1,019 in 2020. Most of the inhabitants lived in the municipal seat.

The population has been diminishing since 1995 when it was 1,535. Causes are the lack of employment and the absence of middle-level schools for families to better educate their children.

The territory once was occupied by the Opata people. In 1645, the Jesuit missionary Cristóbal García founded a settlement to which he gave the name of Santa María de Bacerac, which is derived from the Opata language and means "place where water is seen".

== Economy ==
Agriculture is the mainstay of the economy and the crops are destined to support the occupation of cattle raising, the herd consisting of approximately 10,000 head of cows.
