= XHHOS-FM =

Radio station in Hermosillo, Sonora

- La Paloma, Hermosillo, Sonora; Mexico
- Frequency: 101.9 FM
- Branding: La Invasora

Programming
- Format: Grupera

Ownership
- Owner: Uniradio; (Radiodifusora XEHOS, S.A. de C.V.)
- Sister stations: XHSD-FM, XHDM-FM

History
- First air date: September 29, 1984 (concession)
- Former frequencies: 1540 kHz (1984–2017)
- Call sign meaning: "Hermosillo"

Technical information
- Licensing authority: CRT
- Class: B1
- ERP: 9.4 kW
- HAAT: 183.7 m (603 ft)
- Transmitter coordinates: 29°06′43″N 110°55′58″W

Links
- Website: www.invasora1019.com/invasora1019/inicio

XHHOS-FM is a radio station on 101.9 FM in Hermosillo, Sonora. It is owned by Uniradio and known as La Invasora with a grupera format.

== History ==
XEHOS-AM 1540 received its concession on September 29, 1984. It was owned by Fernando Fernández Almada and broadcast with 5 kW day and 2 kW night. The current concessionaire acquired XEHOS in 1993 and raised its nighttime power to 5 kW.

XEHOS was approved to migrate to FM in 2011 but did not shut off its AM transmitter for another six years.
