= Santa Ana, Sonora =

City in Sonora, Mexico

Coordinates: 30.5406°N 111.1205°W

Santa Ana is a small city and municipal seat of Santa Ana Municipality in the Mexican state of Sonora. It is located 168 kilometres (104 mi) north of the state capital Hermosillo and 100 kilometres (62 mi) south of Nogales on the United States border. The town had a 2005 census population of 10,593 inhabitants.

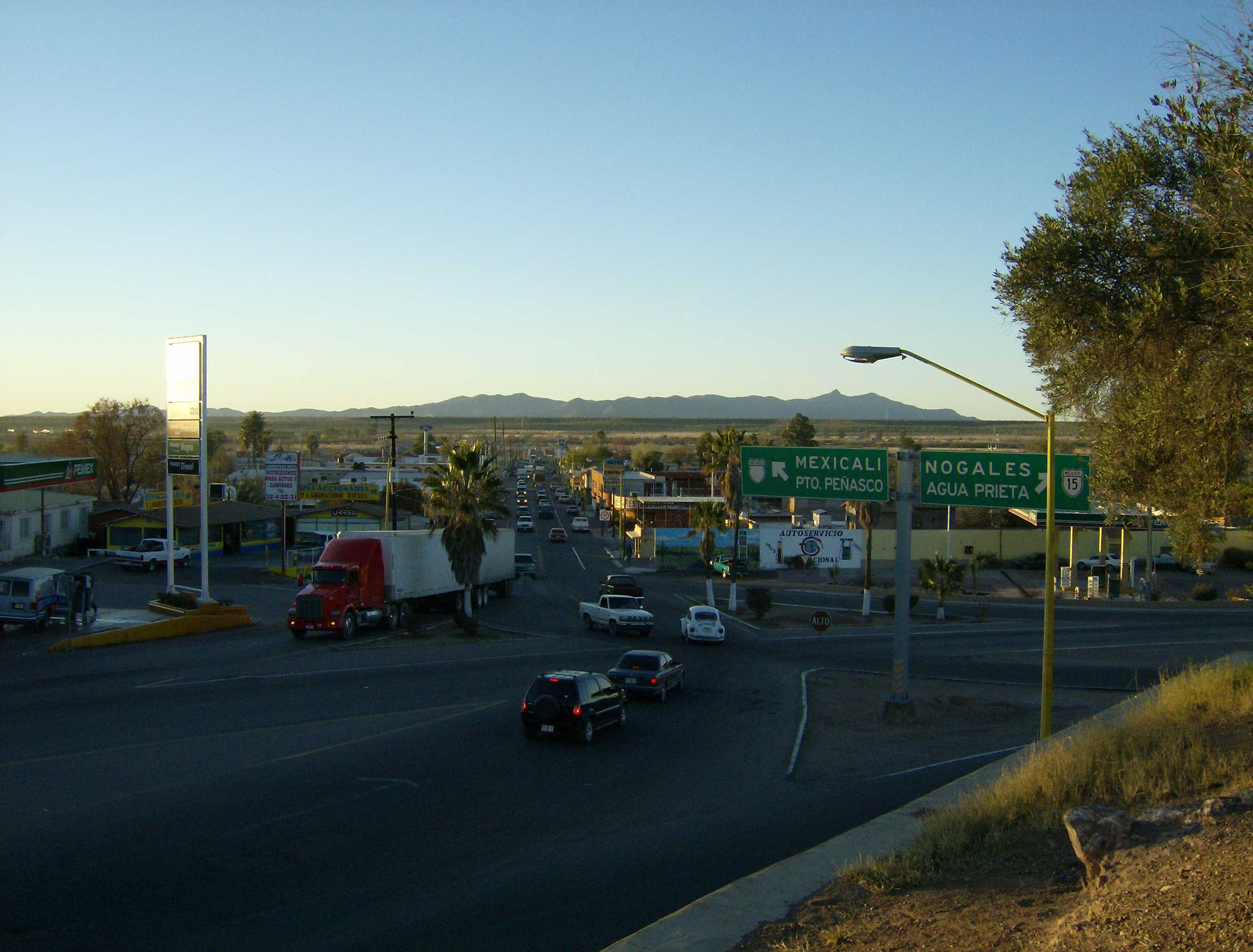
Highway junction in Santa Ana

== History ==
This settlement originated when the Pimas (indigenous people in northwest Mexico) settled in the area now called Santa Ana Viejo attracted by the mission established by the Jesuits. The town was well-established by 1751.

The present town of Santa Ana was founded by Diego A. Moreno in the year 1883, when the Sonoran Railroad was being built in this area of the state. Santa Ana achieved the status of a municipality in 1935. The movie The Fast and The Furious was filmed throughout the months of June and July, 2008, in Santa Ana as well as Magdalena de Kino, Sonora.

The main tourist attraction in Santa Ana is the church built in the 1900s to honor Our Lady of Saint Ana. Every year during the month of July, the whole town celebrates the day of their Saint with a fair and dances.

== Economy ==
Agriculture is an important economic activity with the main crops being wheat, corn, vegetables, and grasses for cattle fodder. Another important economic activity is cattle raising with over 20,000 head counted in the 2000 census. Calves are exported to the United States of America.

The industrial sector is small but one maquiladora plant alone employs around 800 workers.
