= 98.3 FM =

FM radio frequency

The following radio stations broadcast on FM frequency 98.3 MHz:

== Australia ==
- 1XXR in Canberra, Australian Capital Territory
- Radio National in Port Stephens, New South Wales

== Canada (Channel 252) ==
- CBAL-FM in Moncton, New Brunswick
- CBRM-FM in Medicine Hat, Alberta
- CBRU-FM in Squamish, British Columbia
- CBW-FM in Winnipeg, Manitoba
- CFLY-FM in Kingston, Ontario
- CFPX-FM in Pukatawagan, Manitoba
- CFWP-FM in Wahta First Nation, Ontario
- CHER-FM in Sydney, Nova Scotia
- CHNC-FM-2 in Chandler, Quebec
- CHQX-FM-2 in La Ronge, Saskatchewan
- CHUN-FM in Rouyn-Noranda, Quebec
- CIAX-FM in Windsor, Quebec
- CIEL-FM-3 in Cabano, Quebec
- CIFM-FM in Kamloops, British Columbia
- CIWV-FM in Vancouver, British Columbia
- CJMK-FM in Saskatoon, Saskatchewan
- CKRS-FM in Chicoutimi, Quebec
- CKSR-FM in Chilliwack, British Columbia
- CKUA-FM-10 in Athabasca, Alberta
- VF2321 in Kuujjuaq, Quebec
- VOAR-8-FM in Grand Falls, Newfoundland and Labrador

== China ==
- CNR The Voice of China in Jiaxing
- CNR Business Radio in Quanzhou and Putian

== India ==
- Radio Mirchi

== Ireland ==
- Cork Campus Radio in Cork city

== Malaysia ==
- 8FM in Kuching, Sarawak
- Radio Klasik in Selangor and Western Pahang
- Mix in Kuala Terengganu, Terengganu

== Mexico ==
- XHBAJA-FM in San Quintín, Baja California
- XHBF-FM in San Pedro de las Colonias, Coahuila
- XHDT-FM in Ciudad Cuauhtémoc, Chihuahua
- XHEML-FM in Apatzingán, Michoacán
- XHFP-FM in Jalpa, Zacatecas
- XHLG-FM in León, Guanajuato
- XHLI-FM in Villahermosa, Tabasco
- XHMIX-FM in La Rumorosa, Baja California
- XHMTLA-FM in Tlatlaya, State of Mexico
- XHMVM-FM in Maravatío, Michoacán
- XHPAB-FM in La Paz, Baja California Sur
- XHPVBB-FM in Puerto Vallarta, Jalisco
- XHPX-FM in Ciudad Juarez, Chihuahua
- XHRAF-FM in Rafael Delgado, Veracruz

== Philippines ==
- DWID in Dagupan City
- DZLQ in Lucena City
- DWRV in Naga City
- DZIM in Masbate
- DYEZ-FM in Puerto Princesa City
- DYNJ in Iloilo City
- DXUA in Pagadian City
- DXQS in General Santos City

== Portugal ==
- Antena 1 in Montejunto, Lisbon

== Taiwan ==
- Kiss Radio Taiwan in Miaoli

== United Kingdom ==
- BBC Radio 1 in Aberdeen, Abergavenny, Argyll & Bute, Borders, Ceredigion, Folkestone, Kirkcudbright, Lincolnshire, Londonderry, Luddenden, Okehampton, South Newry, Stirling

== United States (Channel 252) ==
- KACE in Beatty, Nevada
- KADQ-FM in Evanston, Wyoming
- KARB in Price, Utah
- KATR-FM in Otis, Colorado
- KBAS-LP in Basin, Montana
- KBEV in Dillon, Montana
- KBOC in Bridgeport, Texas
- KCDM-LP in Burlington, Iowa
- KCRD-LP in Dubuque, Iowa
- KDAR in Oxnard, California
- KDGZ-LP in Townsend, Montana
- KDLA in New Llano, Louisiana
- KDME-LP in Fort Madison, Iowa
- KDVC in Columbia, Missouri
- KDZY in Mccall, Idaho
- KEDI in Bethel, Alaska
- KEJJ in Gunnison, Colorado
- KERM in Torrington, Wyoming
- KEYW in Pasco, Washington
- KFCM in Cherokee Village, Arkansas
- KFFD-LP in Beaverton, Oregon
- KFWG-LP in Clinton, Oklahoma
- KGRK in Glenrock, Wyoming
- KHPJ-LP in Hastings, Nebraska
- KJLC-LP in Crystal City, Texas
- KJMD in Pukalani, Hawaii
- KKEG in Bentonville, Arkansas
- KKFR in Mayer, Arizona
- KKVI-LP in Greenville, Texas
- KLDR in Harbeck-Fruitdale, Oregon
- KMWV in Dallas, Oregon
- KMZZ in Bishop, Texas
- KOHT in Marana, Arizona
- KORA in Bryan, Texas
- KPPK in Rainier, Oregon
- KPTX in Pecos, Texas
- KQYB in Spring Grove, Minnesota
- KQZQ in Kiowa, Kansas
- KRCV in West Covina, California
- KSMK-LP in Saint Marys, Kansas
- KSNQ in Twin Falls, Idaho
- KTUP in Dallas, Oregon
- KTWS in Bend, Oregon
- KULM-FM in Columbus, Texas
- KUQL in Wessington Springs, South Dakota
- KWNN in Turlock, California
- KWQW in Boone, Iowa
- KXBX in Lakeport, California
- KXDJ in Spearman, Texas
- KXGT in Carrington, North Dakota
- KXIM in Sanborn, Iowa
- KYAR in Gatesville, Texas
- KYYK in Palestine, Texas
- KZLA in Riverdale, California
- KZRZ in West Monroe, Louisiana
- KZZS in Story, Wyoming
- WBFA in Fort Mitchell, Alabama
- WBJI in Blackduck, Minnesota
- WBYB in Cleveland, Mississippi
- WCCQ in Crest Hill, Illinois
- WCEF in Ripley, West Virginia
- WCEH-FM in Pinehurst, Georgia
- WCLP-LP in Lake Placid, New York
- WCMZ in Sault Sainte Marie, Michigan
- WCQM in Park Falls, Wisconsin
- WCXT in Hartford, Michigan
- WDAQ in Danbury, Connecticut
- WDLZ in Murfreesboro, North Carolina
- WGCO in Midway, Georgia
- WGWD-LP in Paintsville, Kentucky
- WHAI in Greenfield, Massachusetts
- WHAY in Whitley City, Kentucky
- WHHD in Clearwater, South Carolina
- WHRF in Belle Haven, Virginia
- WIDI in Quebradillas, Puerto Rico
- WILI in Willimantic, Connecticut
- WIST in Thomasville, North Carolina
- WJDR in Prentiss, Mississippi
- WJGG-LP in Thomasville, Georgia
- WJLI in Metropolis, Illinois
- WJMR in Menomonee Falls, Wisconsin
- WJQJ-LP in Gatlinburg, Tennessee
- WKEA in Scottsboro, Alabama
- WKET in Kettering, Ohio
- WKJY in Hempstead, New York
- WKNA in Logan, Ohio
- WKSG in Garrison, Kentucky
- WKSI in Stephens City, Virginia
- WLCS in North Muskegon, Michigan
- WLJI in Summerton, South Carolina
- WLNH in Laconia, New Hampshire
- WLUS in Clarksville, Virginia
- WLVM in Chickasaw, Alabama
- WLXA in Loretto, Tennessee
- WMAN in Fredericktown, Ohio
- WMGQ in New Brunswick, New Jersey
- WMIM in Luna Pier, Michigan
- WMTY-FM in Sweetwater, Tennessee
- WMYP in Frederiksted, Virgin Islands
- WPBE-LP in West Palm Beach, Florida
- WPBV-LP in Palm Beach, Florida
- WPEO-FM in Farmer City, Illinois
- WPKO in Bellefontaine, Ohio
- WPKV in Duquesne, Pennsylvania
- WQEG-LP in Chicago, Illinois
- WQRS in Salamanca, New York
- WQXE in Elizabethtown, Kentucky
- WRBG in Mifflinburg, Pennsylvania
- WRLR-LP in Round Lake Heights, Illinois
- WRTO-FM in Goulds, Florida
- WRUP in Munising, Michigan
- WSGN in Stewartville, Alabama
- WSMD in Mechanicsville, Maryland
- WSUL in Monticello, New York
- WSVZ in Tower Hill, Illinois
- WTKU in Petersburg, New Jersey
- WTRY in Rotterdam, New York
- WUIN (FM) in Oak Island, North Carolina
- WVIN in Bath, New York
- WWRZ in Fort Meade, Florida
- WYBL in Ashtabula, Ohio
- WYMR in Culver, Indiana
- WYZK-LP in Hartselle, Alabama
- WZFE-LP in Moca, Puerto Rico
- WZNY-LP in Fairport, New York
- WZRL in Plainfield, Indiana
- WZZY in Winchester, Indiana
