= List of FM radio stations in the United States by call sign (initial letters KD–KF) =

This is a list of FM radio stations in the United States having call signs beginning with the letters KD through KF. Low-power FM radio stations, those with designations such as KDDE-LP, have not been included in this list.

== KD-- ==
Callsign	Frequency	City of license
KDAA	103.1 FM	Rolla, Missouri
KDAD	103.7 FM	Victor, Idaho
KDAG	96.9 FM	Farmington, New Mexico
KDAI	89.1 FM	Scottsbluff, Nebraska
KDAL-FM	95.7 FM	Duluth, Minnesota
KDAM	94.3 FM	Hartington, Nebraska
KDAN	91.5 FM	Marshall, California
KDAO-FM	92.9 FM	Eldora, Iowa
KDAP-FM	96.5 FM	Douglas, Arizona
KDAQ	89.9 FM	Shreveport, Louisiana
KDAR	98.3 FM	Oxnard, California
KDAT	104.5 FM	Cedar Rapids, Iowa
KDAY	93.5 FM	Redondo Beach, California
KDB	93.7 FM	Santa Barbara, California
KDBB	104.3 FM	Bonne Terre, Missouri
KDBH-FM	97.5 FM	Natchitoches, Louisiana
KDBI-FM	106.3 FM	Homedale, Idaho
KDBL	92.9 FM	Toppenish, Washington
KDBN	101.1 FM	Parachute, Colorado
KDBR	106.3 FM	Kalispell, Montana
KDBX	107.1 FM	Clear Lake, South Dakota
KDCB	89.5 FM	Coos Bay, Oregon
KDCD	92.9 FM	San Angelo, Texas
KDCJ	91.5 FM	Kermit, Texas
KDCQ	92.9 FM	Coos Bay, Oregon
KDCZ	107.7 FM	Saint Charles, Minnesota
KDDB	102.7 FM	Waipahu, Hawaii
KDDD-FM	95.3 FM	Dumas, Texas
KDDG	105.5 FM	Albany, Minnesota
KDDK	105.5 FM	Addis, Louisiana
KDDL	94.3 FM	Chino Valley, Arizona
KDDM	100.5 FM	Annona, Texas
KDDQ	105.3 FM	Comanche, Oklahoma
KDDS-FM	99.3 FM	Elma–Aberdeen, Washington
KDDV-FM	101.5 FM	Wright, Wyoming
KDDX	101.1 FM	Spearfish, South Dakota
KDEL-FM	100.9 FM	Arkadelphia, Arkansas
KDEM	94.3 FM	Deming, New Mexico
KDER	99.3 FM	Comstock, Texas
KDES-FM	98.5 FM	Cathedral City, California
KDEW-FM	97.3 FM	De Witt, Arkansas
KDEX-FM	102.3 FM	Dexter, Missouri
KDEY-FM	93.5 FM	Ontario, California
KDFC	90.3 FM	San Francisco, California
KDFG	103.9 FM	Seaside, California
KDFM	103.3 FM	Falfurrias, Texas
KDFO	98.5 FM	Delano, California
KDFR	91.3 FM	Des Moines, Iowa
KDGE	102.1 FM	Fort Worth–Dallas, Texas
KDGL	106.9 FM	Yucca Valley, California
KDGS	93.5 FM	Andover, Kansas
KDHK	100.5 FM	Decorah, Iowa
KDHT	95.7 FM	Denver, Colorado
KDIS-FM	99.5 FM	Little Rock, Arkansas
KDJA	94.9 FM	Terrebonne, Oregon
KDJC	88.1 FM	Baker, Oregon
KDJE	100.3 FM	Jacksonville, Arkansas
KDJF	93.5 FM	Ester, Alaska
KDJJ	94.1 FM	Fernley, Nevada
KDJK	103.9 FM	Mariposa, California
KDJL	99.5 FM	Kilgore, Nebraska
KDJR	100.1 FM	De Soto, Missouri
KDJS-FM	95.3 FM	Willmar, Minnesota
KDKA-FM	93.7 FM	Pittsburgh, Pennsylvania
KDKB	93.3 FM	Mesa, Arizona
KDKD-FM	95.3 FM	Clinton, Missouri
KDKE	102.5 FM	Superior, Wisconsin
KDKK	97.5 FM	Park Rapids, Minnesota
KDKL	103.7 FM	Okemah, Oklahoma
KDKN	106.7 FM	Ellington, Missouri
KDKO	89.5 FM	Lake Andes, South Dakota
KDKR	91.3 FM	Decatur, Texas
KDKS-FM	102.1 FM	Blanchard, Louisiana
KDKY	91.5 FM	Marathon, Texas
KDLA	98.3 FM	New Llano, Louisiana
KDLB	94.5 FM	Frazee, Minnesota
KDLC	97.7 FM	Dulac, Louisiana
KDLD	103.1 FM	Santa Monica, California
KDLE	103.1 FM	Newport Beach, California
KDLG-FM	89.9 FM	Dillingham, Alaska
KDLI	89.9 FM	Del Rio, Texas
KDLK-FM	94.1 FM	Del Rio, Texas
KDLL	91.9 FM	Kenai, Alaska
KDLO-FM	96.9 FM	Watertown, South Dakota
KDLS-FM	105.5 FM	Perry, Iowa
KDLX	94.3 FM	Makawao, Hawaii
KDLY	97.5 FM	Lander, Wyoming
KDLZ	101.5 FM	The Dalles, Oregon
KDMA-FM	93.9 FM	Granite Falls, Minnesota
KDMB	88.7 FM	Moses Lake, Washington
KDMC-FM	88.7 FM	Van Buren, Missouri
KDMG	103.1 FM	Burlington, Iowa
KDMM	103.1 FM	Parker Strip, Arizona
KDMX	102.9 FM	Dallas, Texas
KDNA	91.9 FM	Yakima, Washington
KDNE	91.9 FM	Crete, Nebraska
KDNG	89.3 FM	Durango, Colorado
KDNI	90.5 FM	Duluth, Minnesota
KDNK	88.1 FM	Glenwood Springs, Colorado
KDNM	90.1 FM	Reserve, New Mexico
KDNN	98.5 FM	Honolulu, Hawaii
KDNO	101.7 FM	Thermopolis, Wyoming
KDNR	88.7 FM	South Greeley, Wyoming
KDNS	94.1 FM	Downs, Kansas
KDNW	97.3 FM	Duluth, Minnesota
KDNZ	97.3 FM	Pecos, Texas
KDOB	91.5 FM	Brookings, Oregon
KDOC-FM	103.9 FM	Eyota, Minnesota
KDOE	102.3 FM	Antlers, Oklahoma
KDOG	96.7 FM	North Mankato, Minnesota
KDOM-FM	94.3 FM	Windom, Minnesota
KDON-FM	102.5 FM	Salinas, California
KDOT	104.5 FM	Reno, Nevada
KDOV	91.7 FM	Medford, Oregon
KDOX	91.3 FM	Big Pine, California
KDPI	88.5 FM	Ketchum, Idaho
KDPM	92.3 FM	Marshall, Texas
KDPO	91.9 FM	Port Orford, Oregon
KDPR	89.9 FM	Dickinson, North Dakota
KDPS	88.1 FM	Des Moines, Iowa
KDPX	101.3 FM	Pine Bluff, Arkansas
KDQN-FM	92.1 FM	De Queen, Arkansas
KDRB	100.3 FM	Des Moines, Iowa
KDRF	103.3 FM	Albuquerque, New Mexico
KDRG	91.9 FM	Deering, Alaska
KDRH	91.3 FM	King City, California
KDRK-FM	93.7 FM	Spokane, Washington
KDRM	99.3 FM	Moses Lake, Washington
KDRS-FM	107.1 FM	Paragould, Arkansas
KDRW	88.7 FM	Santa Barbara, California
KDRX	106.9 FM	Laughlin Air Force Base, Texas
KDSC	91.1 FM	Thousand Oaks, California
KDSD-FM	90.9 FM	Pierpont, South Dakota
KDSK-FM	92.7 FM	Grants, New Mexico
KDSN-FM	107.1 FM	Denison, Iowa
KDSR	101.1 FM	Williston, North Dakota
KDSS	92.7 FM	Ely, Nevada
KDST	99.3 FM	Dyersville, Iowa
KDSU	91.9 FM	Fargo, North Dakota
KDTI	90.3 FM	Rochester Hills, Michigan
KDTR	103.3 FM	Florence, Montana
KDUC	94.3 FM	Barstow, California
KDUK-FM	104.7 FM	Florence, Oregon
KDUP	88.1 FM	Cedarville, California
KDUQ	102.5 FM	Ludlow, California
KDUR	91.9 FM	Durango, Colorado
KDUT	102.3 FM	Randolph, Utah
KDUV	88.9 FM	Visalia, California
KDUW	91.7 FM	Douglas, Wyoming
KDUX-FM	104.7 FM	Hoquiam, Washington
KDVC	98.3 FM	Columbia, Missouri
KDVI	89.9 FM	Devils Lake, North Dakota
KDVL	102.5 FM	Devils Lake, North Dakota
KDVS	90.3 FM	Davis, California
KDVV	100.3 FM	Topeka, Kansas
KDVY	93.5 FM	Crockett, Texas
KDWB-FM	101.3 FM	Richfield, Minnesota
KDWD	99.1 FM	Marceline, Missouri
KDWG	90.9 FM	Dillon, Montana
KDWY	105.3 FM	Diamondville, Wyoming
KDXA	91.3 FM	Glendale, Oregon
KDXE	101.1 FM	Cammack Village, Arkansas
KDXN	105.7 FM	South Heart, North Dakota
KDXT	97.9 FM	Lolo, Montana
KDXU-FM	106.1 FM	Colorado City, Arizona
KDXX	99.1 FM	Denton, Texas
KDXY	104.9 FM	Lake City, Arkansas
KDYN-FM	92.7 FM	Coal Hill, Arkansas
KDYR	90.9 FM	Dyer, Nevada
KDZN	96.5 FM	Glendive, Montana
KDZY	98.3 FM	McCall, Idaho

== KE-- ==
Callsign	Frequency	City of license
KEAG	97.3 FM	Anchorage, Alaska
KEAL	106.5 FM	Taft, California
KEAN-FM	105.1 FM	Abilene, Texas
KEAU	104.7 FM	Elko, Nevada
KEAZ	100.7 FM	Kensett, Arkansas
KEBN	94.3 FM	Garden Grove, California
KEBR	88.1 FM	Sacramento, California
KEBT	96.9 FM	Lost Hills, California
KECC	89.1 FM	La Junta, Colorado
KECG	88.1 FM	El Cerrito, California
KECH-FM	95.3 FM	Sun Valley, Idaho
KECO	96.5 FM	Elk City, Oklahoma
KEDC	88.5 FM	Hearne, Texas
KEDG	106.9 FM	Alexandria, Louisiana
KEDI	98.3 FM	Bethel, Alaska
KEDJ	103.1 FM	Jerome, Idaho
KEDM	90.3 FM	Monroe, Louisiana
KEDP	91.1 FM	Las Vegas, New Mexico
KEDR	91.1 FM	Glenhaven, California
KEDT-FM	90.3 FM	Corpus Christi, Texas
KEDV	90.3 FM	Brackettville, Texas
KEEA	90.1 FM	Aberdeen, South Dakota
KEEH	104.9 FM	Spokane, Washington
KEEI	94.5 FM	Oakwood, Texas
KEEP	103.1 FM	Bandera, Texas
KEEY-FM	102.1 FM	Saint Paul, Minnesota
KEEZ-FM	99.1 FM	Mankato, Minnesota
KEFH	99.3 FM	Clarendon, Texas
KEFL	91.5 FM	Kirksville, Missouri
KEFR	89.9 FM	Le Grand, California
KEFS	89.5 FM	North Powder, Oregon
KEFX	88.9 FM	Twin Falls, Idaho
KEGE	101.7 FM	Hamilton City, California
KEGH	107.1 FM	Woodruff, Utah
KEGI	100.5 FM	Trumann, Arkansas
KEGK	106.9 FM	Wahpeton, North Dakota
KEGL	97.1 FM	Fort Worth, Texas
KEGT	106.5 FM	San Miguel, California
KEGX	106.5 FM	Richland, Washington
KEHH	92.3 FM	Livingston, Texas
KEHK	102.3 FM	Brownsville, Oregon
KEHM	99.3 FM	Colorado City, Texas
KEJA	91.7 FM	Cale, Arkansas
KEJJ	98.3 FM	Gunnison, Colorado
KEJS	88.1 FM	Sargent, Nebraska
KEKA-FM	101.5 FM	Eureka, California
KEKB	99.9 FM	Fruita, Colorado
KEKL	90.7 FM	Emporia, Kansas
KEKO	101.7 FM	Hebronville, Texas
KEKS	103.1 FM	Olpe, Kansas
KELC	91.9 FM	Hawthorne, Nevada
KELD-FM	106.5 FM	Hampton, Arkansas
KELI	98.7 FM	San Angelo, Texas
KELN	97.1 FM	North Platte, Nebraska
KELO-FM	95.7 FM	Dell Rapids, South Dakota
KELP-FM	89.3 FM	Mesquite, New Mexico
KELQ	107.9 FM	Flandreau, South Dakota
KELT	102.5 FM	Encinal, Texas
KELU	90.3 FM	Clovis, New Mexico
KELW	95.3 FM	Gilmer, Texas
KEMA	94.5 FM	Three Rivers, Texas
KEMC	91.7 FM	Billings, Montana
KEMJ	101.5 FM	Saint James, Minnesota
KEMP	99.3 FM	Payson, Arizona
KEMX	94.5 FM	Locust Grove, Oklahoma
KENA-FM	104.1 FM	Hatfield, Arkansas
KENC	90.7 FM	Estes Park, Colorado
KEND	106.5 FM	Roswell, New Mexico
KENE	88.1 FM	Eagle Tail, New Mexico
KENG	88.5 FM	Ruidoso, New Mexico
KENM	88.9 FM	Tucumcari, New Mexico
KENR	107.5 FM	Superior, Montana
KENU	88.5 FM	Des Moines, New Mexico
KENW-FM	89.5 FM	Portales, New Mexico
KENZ	94.9 FM	Provo, Utah
KEOJ	101.1 FM	Caney, Kansas
KEOK	102.1 FM	Tahlequah, Oklahoma
KEOM	88.5 FM	Mesquite, Texas
KEON	94.9 FM	Ganado, Texas
KEOS	89.1 FM	College Station, Texas
KEPC	89.7 FM	Colorado Springs, Colorado
KEPD	104.9 FM	Ridgecrest, California
KEPI	88.7 FM	Eagle Pass, Texas
KEPX	89.5 FM	Eagle Pass, Texas
KEQB	97.7 FM	Coburg, Oregon
KEQX	89.5 FM	Stephenville, Texas
KERA	90.1 FM	Dallas, Texas
KERG	104.7 FM	Escobares, Texas
KERL	103.9 FM	Earle, Arkansas
KERM	98.3 FM	Torrington, Wyoming
KERP	96.3 FM	Ingalls, Kansas
KERU-FM	88.5 FM	Blythe, California
KERW	101.3 FM	Los Osos-Baywood Park, California
KERX	95.3 FM	Paris, Arkansas
KESA	100.9 FM	Eureka Springs, Arkansas
KESC	99.7 FM	Morro Bay, California
KESD	88.3 FM	Brookings, South Dakota
KESM-FM	105.5 FM	El Dorado Springs, Missouri
KESO	92.7 FM	South Padre Island, Texas
KESR	107.1 FM	Shasta Lake City, California
KESS	93.3 FM	Port Arthur, Texas
KESY	91.9 FM	Baker City, Oregon
KESZ	99.9 FM	Phoenix, Arizona
KETE	99.7 FM	Sulphur Bluff, Texas
KETP	88.7 FM	Enterprise, Oregon
KETR	88.9 FM	Commerce, Texas
KETT	99.5 FM	Mitchell, Nebraska
KEUB	93.3 FM	Gearhart, Oregon
KEUC	104.9 FM	Ringwood, Oklahoma
KEUG	105.5 FM	Veneta, Oregon
KEUK	89.7 FM	Eureka, Montana
KEUL	88.9 FM	Girdwood, Alaska
KEUN-FM	105.5 FM	Eunice, Louisiana
KEUW	89.9 FM	Torrington, Wyoming
KEVK-FM	105.1 FM	Sanderson, Texas
KEVM-FM	107.3 FM	Junction, Texas
KEVQ-FM	100.7 FM	Crosbyton, Texas
KEWB	94.7 FM	Anderson, California
KEWF	98.5 FM	Billings, Montana
KEWL-FM	95.1 FM	New Boston, Texas
KEWP	103.5 FM	Uvalde Estates, Texas
KEWR-FM	89.9 FM	Cedar Rapids, Iowa
KEWU-FM	89.5 FM	Cheney, Washington
KEXA	93.9 FM	King City, California
KEXL	106.7 FM	Pierce, Nebraska
KEXC	92.7 FM	Alameda, California
KEXP-FM	90.3 FM	Seattle, Washington
KEXS-FM	106.1 FM	Ravenwood, Missouri
KEYA	88.5 FM	Belcourt, North Dakota
KEYB	107.9 FM	Altus, Oklahoma
KEYE-FM	93.7 FM	Perryton, Texas
KEYF-FM	101.1 FM	Cheney, Washington
KEYJ-FM	107.9 FM	Abilene, Texas
KEYK	89.3 FM	Osage Beach, Missouri
KEYN-FM	103.7 FM	Wichita, Kansas
KEYP	91.9 FM	Price, Utah
KEYR	91.7 FM	Richfield, Utah
KEYV	91.7 FM	Vernal, Utah
KEYW	98.3 FM	Pasco, Washington
KEZA	107.9 FM	Fayetteville, Arkansas
KEZB	90.7 FM	Beaver, Utah
KEZE	96.9 FM	Spokane, Washington
KEZF	88.7 FM	Grants, New Mexico
KEZJ-FM	95.7 FM	Twin Falls, Idaho
KEZO-FM	92.3 FM	Omaha, Nebraska
KEZP	104.3 FM	Bunkie, Louisiana
KEZQ	92.9 FM	West Yellowstone
KEZR	106.5 FM	San Jose, California
KEZS-FM	102.9 FM	Cape Girardeau, Missouri
KEZZ	94.1 FM	Phippsburg, Colorado

== KF-- ==
Callsign	Frequency	City of license
KFAA	89.5 FM	Horace, North Dakota
KFAE-FM	89.1 FM	Richland, Washington
KFAH	99.1 FM	Pineland, Texas
KFAI	90.3 FM	Minneapolis, Minnesota
KFAN-FM	107.9 FM	Johnson City, Texas
KFAT	92.9 FM	Anchorage, Alaska
KFAV	99.9 FM	Warrenton, Missouri
KFBD-FM	97.9 FM	Waynesville, Missouri
KFBG	100.7 FM	San Diego, California
KFBK-FM	93.1 FM	Pollock Pines, California
KFBN	88.7 FM	Fargo, North Dakota
KFBR	91.5 FM	Gerlach, Nevada
KFBT	103.7 FM	Hanford, California
KFBW	105.9 FM	Vancouver, Washington
KFBZ	105.3 FM	Haysville, Kansas
KFCF	88.1 FM	Fresno, California
KFCM	98.3 FM	Cherokee Village, Arkansas
KFCO	107.1 FM	Bennett, Colorado
KFCV	90.5 FM	Dixon, Missouri
KFCW	93.1 FM	Riverton, Wyoming
KFCX	106.1 FM	Floydada, Texas
KFDI-FM	101.3 FM	Wichita, Kansas
KFDJ	90.5 FM	Glendale, Utah
KFDS-FM	92.5 FM	Mountain Grove, Missouri
KFEB	107.5 FM	Campbell, Missouri
KFEG	104.7 FM	Klamath Falls, Oregon
KFER	89.9 FM	Santa Cruz, California
KFEZ	101.3 FM	Walsenburg, Colorado
KFFA-FM	103.1 FM	Helena, Arkansas
KFFB	106.1 FM	Fairfield Bay, Arkansas
KFFF	93.3 FM	Bennington, Nebraska
KFFM	107.3 FM	Yakima, Washington
KFFR	88.3 FM	Winter Park, Colorado
KFFX	104.9 FM	Emporia, Kansas
KFGE	98.1 FM	Milford, Nebraska
KFGI	101.5 FM	Crosby, Minnesota
KFGM-FM	101.5 FM	Frenchtown, Montana
KFGO-FM	104.7 FM	Hope, North Dakota
KFGR	88.1 FM	Powell, Wyoming
KFGY	92.9 FM	Healdsburg, California
KFHC	88.1 FM	Ponca, Nebraska
KFHL	91.7 FM	Wasco, California
KFHM	88.7 FM	Big Bear City, California
KFIL-FM	103.1 FM	Chatfield, Minnesota
KFIN	107.9 FM	Jonesboro, Arkansas
KFIS	104.1 FM	Scappoose, Oregon
KFIX	96.9 FM	Plainville, Kansas
KFJC	89.7 FM	Los Altos, California
KFJM	90.7 FM	Grand Forks, North Dakota
KFJS	90.1 FM	North Platte, Nebraska
KFKF-FM	94.1 FM	Kansas City, Kansas
KFLB-FM	88.1 FM	Stanton, Texas
KFLF	91.3 FM	Somers, Montana
KFLG-FM	94.7 FM	Big River, California
KFLI	104.7 FM	Des Arc, Arkansas
KFLK	88.1 FM	Minot, North Dakota
KFLO-FM	90.9 FM	Minden, Louisiana
KFLQ	91.5 FM	Albuquerque, New Mexico
KFLR-FM	90.3 FM	Phoenix, Arizona
KFLS-FM	96.5 FM	Tulelake, California
KFLT-FM	104.1 FM	Tucson, Arizona
KFLV	89.9 FM	Wilber, Nebraska
KFLW	98.9 FM	St. Robert, Missouri
KFLX	92.5 FM	Chino Valley, Arizona
KFLY	101.5 FM	Corvallis, Oregon
KFMA	102.1 FM	Oro Valley, Arizona
KFMC-FM	106.5 FM	Fairmont, Minnesota
KFMH	101.9 FM	Belle Fourche, South Dakota
KFMI	96.3 FM	Eureka, California
KFMJ	99.9 FM	Ketchikan, Alaska
KFMK	105.9 FM	Round Rock, Texas
KFML	94.1 FM	Little Falls, Minnesota
KFMM	99.1 FM	Virden, New Mexico
KFMN	96.9 FM	Lihue, Hawaii
KFMP	88.3 FM	Meade, Kansas
KFMQ	106.1 FM	Gallup, New Mexico
KFMR	97.3	Central Heights–Midland City, Arizona
KFMT-FM	105.5 FM	Fremont, Nebraska
KFMU-FM	104.1 FM	Oak Creek, Colorado
KFMW	107.9 FM	Waterloo, Iowa
KFMX-FM	94.5 FM	Lubbock, Texas
KFNC	97.5 FM	Mont Belvieu, Texas
KFNF	101.1 FM	Oberlin, Kansas
KFNL-FM	104.3 FM	Spring Valley, Minnesota
KFNO	90.3 FM	Fresno, California
KFNS-FM	100.7 FM	Troy, Missouri
KFNV-FM	107.1 FM	Ferriday, Louisiana
KFNW-FM	97.9 FM	Fargo, North Dakota
KFNZ-FM	96.5 FM	Kansas City, Missouri
KFOI	90.9 FM	Red Bluff, California
KFOM	88.7 FM	Stanton, Iowa
KFON	93.9 FM	Groveton, Texas
KFOO-FM	96.1 FM	Opportunity, Washington
KFPR	88.9 FM	Redding, California
KFPS	88.1 FM	False Pass, Alaska
KFPW-FM	94.5 FM	Barling, Arkansas
KFRB	91.3 FM	Bakersfield, California
KFRC-FM	106.9 FM	San Francisco, California
KFRD	88.9 FM	Butte, Montana
KFRG	95.1 FM	San Bernardino, California
KFRI	88.7 FM	West Odessa, Texas
KFRQ	94.5 FM	Harlingen, Texas
KFRR	104.1 FM	Woodlake, California
KFRS	89.9 FM	Soledad, California
KFRX	106.3 FM	Lincoln, Nebraska
KFRY	89.9 FM	Pueblo, Colorado
KFRZ	92.1 FM	Green River, Wyoming
KFSE	106.9 FM	Kasilof, Alaska
KFSH-FM	95.9 FM	Anaheim, California
KFSI	92.9 FM	Rochester, Minnesota
KFSK	100.9 FM	Petersburg, Alaska
KFSO-FM	92.9 FM	Visalia, California
KFSR	90.7 FM	Fresno, California
KFST-FM	94.3 FM	Fort Stockton, Texas
KFSZ	106.1 FM	Munds Park, Arizona
KFTE	105.1 FM	Abbeville, Louisiana
KFTG	88.1 FM	Pasadena, Texas
KFTK-FM	97.1 FM	Florissant, Missouri
KFTX	97.5 FM	Kingsville, Texas
KFTZ	103.3 FM	Idaho Falls, Idaho
KFUE	106.7 FM	Buckeye, Arizona
KFUT	89.5 FM	Twain Harte, California
KFWA	103.1 FM	Weldona, Colorado
KFWR	95.9 FM	Jacksboro, Texas
KFXE	96.5 FM	Ingram, Texas
KFXH	88.7 FM	Marlow, Oklahoma
KFXI	92.1 FM	Marlow, Oklahoma
KFXJ	104.5 FM	Augusta, Kansas
KFXN-FM	100.3 FM	Minneapolis, Minnesota
KFXR-FM	107.3 FM	Chinle, Arizona
KFXS	100.3 FM	Rapid City, South Dakota
KFXT	90.7 FM	Sulphur, Oklahoma
KFXU	90.5 FM	Chickasha, Oklahoma
KFXX-FM	99.5 FM	Klamath Falls, Oregon
KFXY	90.3 FM	Buena Vista, Colorado
KFXZ-FM	105.9 FM	Opelousas, Louisiana
KFYN-FM	104.3 FM	Detroit, Texas
KFYV	105.5 FM	Ojai, California
KFZE	104.3 FM	Daniel, Wyoming
KFZO	107.9 FM	Lewisville, Texas
KFZX	102.1 FM	Gardendale, Texas

== See also ==
- North American call sign
