= Arizona Coyotes Radio Network =

Network of radio stations

The Arizona Coyotes Radio Network was a 10-station network of radio stations in the U.S. state of Arizona. The flagship of the network is KTAR.

== Radio Network list of stations ==
=== Flagships (3 stations) ===
- 620/KTAR: Phoenix
- 98.7/KMVP-FM: Phoenix (when there is a conflict on KTAR)
- 92.3/KTAR-FM: Glendale (when there is a conflict on KTAR and KMVP-FM)

=== Affiliates (7 stations) ===
- 600/KVNA: Flagstaff
- 980/KNTR: Lake Havasu City
- 1340/KIKO: Miami
- 1130/KQNA: Prescott Valley
- 94.3/KDDL: Prescott
- 1230/KATO: Safford
- 780/KAZM: Sedona
