= KYHD =

KYHD may refer to:

- KYHD (FM), a radio station (94.7 FM) licensed to serve Valliant, Oklahoma, United States
- Keep Your Head Down, an album by TVXQ
