= KCOU =

Radio station at the University of Missouri in Columbia

- Columbia, Missouri; United States
- Frequency: 88.1 MHz
- Branding: KCOU 88.1 FM

Programming
- Format: College

Ownership
- Owner: Missouri Students Association; (The Curators of the University of Missouri)

History
- First air date: October 31, 1973 on 88.3 MHz, 16 watts, monaural
- Former call signs: KEJJ (1993–1994)

Technical information
- Facility ID: 28513
- Class: A
- ERP: 430 watts
- HAAT: 44.0 meters
- Transmitter coordinates: 38°56′23″N 92°19′20″W

Links
- Website: kcou.fm

KCOU (88.1 FM) is a radio station broadcasting the College radio format. Licensed to Columbia, Missouri, United States, the station is currently owned by the Missouri Students Association at the University of Missouri.

== History ==
Originally known as KCCS (the Kampus Carrier Current Station), the station was founded in a dorm broom closet in 1963 as a carrier current AM station at 580 kHz. In 1973, the Independent Residence Halls Association was granted a broadcast license by the Federal Communications Commission (FCC) to operate in monaural at 88.3 MHz FM with 16 watts. Historically, this was the first license ever issued to a student group within a university, instead of to a university's administration. Operation began Halloween evening, playing the oddball tune "They're Coming to Take Me Away Ha-Haaa!".

In the mid-1990s, the Missouri Students Association bought the station from the Residence Halls Association, who deemed it a financial burden for the organization.

The student-run station gained fame during the 1970s, 1980s, and 1990s by promoting alternative music/college rock and providing a platform for new artists and new trends. It has broken or been among the first radio stations to play bands such as Death Cab for Cutie, Uncle Tupelo, White Rabbits and Ditch Witch.

In 1993, the station reunited the cult favorite Big Star as part of its annual Springfest concert. That show featured original bandmembers Alex Chilton and Jody Stephens, along with Jon Auer and Ken Stringfellow of the Posies. A recording of that reunion show was released as Columbia: Live at Missouri University 4/25/93.

The 2008–2009 staff included General Manager John Dobson and Program Director/Chief Engineer Jonathan Hutcheson.

Innovations at KCOU as of fall 2008 include a new Web site, kcou.fm. The site features live audio streaming worldwide. In February 2009, KCOU launched a news department, which provides on-the-hour news updates every weekday. For the 2008–2009 school year, the station had more than 120 student volunteers.

In January 2009, power to KCOU's FM signal was shut off when Hudson Hall, the MU residence hall where the station's broadcasting tower and transmitter sit, went offline for renovation. Through the Missouri Students Association, the station secured funding to construct a new tower atop Schurz Hall on the MU campus. KCOU was off the airwaves for most of the Spring 2009 semester and through part of the following summer. However, while off the air, KCOU still maintained a live, online broadcast 24/7 which was and continues to be made available through its website.

The station returned to the radio airwaves with full its FM broadcast capability on July 9, 2009, after experiencing some construction, equipment, and engineering delays.

== News department ==
In spring of 2009, KCOU launched its news department under the slogan "Your only source for live campus news." The department began broadcasting news updates at the top of the hour throughout the day. In fall 2009, KCOU News launched a 15-minute newscast, "The Pulse," during evening drive-time. The show was later expanded to a half-hour and then, in January 2011, a full hour of news from 4:30–5:30 p.m., making it mid-Missouri's earliest evening newscast.

Currently, "The Pulse" is broadcast on weekdays from 5:00–6:00 p.m. "The Pulse" features live interviews, pre-recorded stories, and discussions from a rotating cast of anchors. It also includes reports on live weather and traffic conditions around Columbia, Mo.

The news department also produces a variety of other talk and variety shows. In the past, these included a Sunday afternoon news review, "NewsHour," that featured in-depth interviews with individuals from the MU campus and the Columbia community. Other historical shows include "Point-Counterpoint" and the award-winning science show "The Big Electron." Former News Directors include Michael Reese (1981) Theo Keith (2009–2010) and Blake Hanson (2010–2011).

== Sports department ==
In the 2009–2010 school year, the station carried Missouri men's basketball games for the first time.

In the 2013–2014 school year, the station carried all Missouri football games live at home and the road, along with a live slate of Missouri Men's basketball games, specifically home conference games, select non-conference opponents, as well as the SEC Tournament. Football coverage typically begins 1 hour before kick-off under the moniker "Tiger Pre-Game Live", while basketball coverage starts 30 minutes before tip-off under the moniker "Tiger Tip-Off Live", expanded to an hour for Conference and NCAA Tournament Coverage. The postgame reports for both sports are branded "Tiger Postgame Report."

In 2017, KCOU broadcast the Texas Bowl at NRG Stadium in Houston, Texas. In 2018 and 2019, the station traveled to every Missouri football road game.

The sports department also broadcasts dozens of talk shows focusing on a wide variety of sports topics locally, nationally, and internationally. As of Fall 2019, the station carried Missouri men and women's basketball, football, volleyball, soccer, and hockey all live.

== Awards ==
- College music Journal “Best College general Manager” Pat Fleming (2008) KCOU 88.1
- College Music Journal "Best College Radio Station of the Year" (1989) – KCOU 88.1 FM
- Howard Scripps Foundation "Most Valuable Staffer" (2002) – Elaine Miller; Promotions Co-director
- Communicator Award of Distinction (2009) – 2008 Election Coverage (Overall Newscast, Student Produced Programming)
- mtvU College Radio Woodie Award - Runner-Up (2009) – KCOU 88.1 FM
- Communicator Award of Distinction (2010) – Election Coverage in 2009–2010
- Intercollegiate Broadcasting System - Finalist (2015) – "Missouri vs. Arkansas - Men's Soccer" (Best Sports Play-By-Play - Others)
- Intercollegiate Broadcasting System - Finalist (2016) – "Mizzou vs. Texas A&M" (Best Sports Play-By-Play - Baseball/Softball)
- Intercollegiate Broadcasting System - Finalist (2016) – "Interview with Tommy Wiseau" (Best Celebrity/Artist Interview)
- Missouri Broadcasters Association - First Place (2016) – "Mizzou vs. Northwestern - Men's Basketball" (Play-By-Play - Radio Only)
- Intercollegiate Broadcasting System - Winner (2017) – "The Big Electron" (Best Public Affairs Program)
- Intercollegiate Broadcasting System - Finalist (2017) – "Football vs. LSU (Best Sports Play-By-Play - Football)
- Intercollegiate Broadcasting System - Finalist (2017) – "Warhol.ss Live at KCOU" (Best Use of Video in the Radio Studio)

== See also ==
- Campus radio
- List of college radio stations in the United States
