= KAKP =

KAKP may refer to:

- KAKP (FM), a radio station (101.3 FM) licensed to serve Pasco, Washington, United States
- KDDL, a radio station (94.3 FM) licensed to serve Chino Valley, Arizona, United States which held this call sign from 1996 to 2008
