= KPPV =

- Prescott Valley, Arizona; United States
- Broadcast area: Prescott, Arizona
- Frequency: 106.9 MHz (HD Radio)
- Branding: The Mix 106.9 FM

Programming
- Format: Adult contemporary
- Subchannels: HD2: 94.7 Jack FM (Adult hits); HD3: Juan 107 (Spanish CHR)

Ownership
- Owner: Arizona's Hometown Radio Group; (Prescott Valley Broadcasting Co. Inc.)
- Sister stations: KDDL, KPKR, KQNA, KUGO

History
- First air date: September 1, 1985
- Former call signs: KIHX-FM (1985–1994)
- Former frequencies: 106.7 MHz (1985–2023)

Technical information
- Licensing authority: FCC
- Facility ID: 53414
- Class: C2
- ERP: 4,000 watts
- HAAT: 483 meters (1,585 ft)
- Transmitter coordinates: 34°29′24″N 112°32′03″W
- Translator: See § Translators
- Repeater: 106.9 KPPV-FM2 (Prescott Valley)

Links
- Public license information: Public file; LMS
- Webcast: Listen live HD2: Listen live HD3: Listen live
- Website: kppv.com jackfmarizona.com (HD2) juan107.com (HD3)

KPPV (106.9 FM, "The Mix 106.9 FM") is an American radio station licensed to serve Prescott Valley, Arizona, United States. It began broadcasting on September 1, 1985, from the studio at Robert Road and Jacque Drive. The station is owned by Sanford and Terry Cohen d/b/a Arizona's Hometown Radio Group and licensed to Prescott Valley Broadcasting Co. Inc. Its coverage area spans the Prescott/Prescott Valley/Chino Valley/Dewey-Humboldt Quad Cities area. KPPV is also heard via licensed FM booster on 106.9 in Cottonwood and Clarkdale, Arizona and via FM Translator on 100.7 in Flagstaff, AZ. KPPV developed the first solar powered FM transmitter site atop Glassford Hill in 1986. KPPV received commendations from the Small Business Administration as Innovative Advocates of the year for 1987 and special recognition by the US Secretary of Energy. In 1992, it was granted permission to upgrade to Class C2 at 50,000 watts ERP and moved to Mt. Francis SW of Prescott. KPPV won the National Association of Broadcasters Crystal Award for outstanding community service in 1988. It airs an adult contemporary music format.

KPPV is a member of the Prescott, Prescott Valley, Chino Valley, Cottonwood-Verde Valley and Flagstaff Chambers of Commerce as well as a member of the Prescott Downtown Partnership.

The station was assigned the KPPV call sign by the Federal Communications Commission on October 7, 1994.

On October 30, 2023, KPPV moved from 106.7 FM to 106.9 FM and rebranded as "The Mix 106.9 FM".

== HD Radio ==
KPPV-HD2 broadcasts JACK FM (Adult hits) and by translator K234CF on 94.7 serving the Prescott Quad Cities and Cottonwood.

KPPV-HD3 broadcasts JUAN FM (Spanish format) and by translator K293DD on 106.5 serving the Prescott Quad Cities and Cottonwood.

== Translators ==
Broadcast translators for KPPV
Call sign	Frequency	City of license	FID	ERP (W)	Class	FCC info
K254CB	98.7 FM	Prescott, Arizona	156429	250	D	LMS
K264BD	100.7 FM	Flagstaff, Arizona	20642	10	D	LMS
K287BZ	105.3 FM	Cottonwood, Arizona	144651	10	D	LMS
KPPV-FM2	106.9 FM	Prescott Valley, Arizona	190350	100	D	LMS

Broadcast translator for KPPV-HD2
Call sign	Frequency	City of license	FID	ERP (W)	Class	FCC info
K234CF	94.7 FM	Prescott, Arizona	145014	250	D	LMS

Broadcast translator for KPPV-HD3
Call sign	Frequency	City of license	FID	ERP (W)	Class	FCC info
K293DD	106.5 FM	Prescott Valley, Arizona	156453	99	D	LMS

== Previous logo ==
(Station's logo under previous 106.7 frequency)
