= WRLR =

WRLR may refer to:

- Women's Rights Law Reporter, the Women's Rights Law Reporter, a legal journal founded at Rutgers School of Law–Newark in 1970 by Supreme Court Justice Ruth Bader Ginsburg.
- WRLR-LP, a low-power radio station (98.3 FM) licensed to Round Lake Heights, Illinois, United States
- Juwata Airport (ICAO code WRLR)
