= Western Colorado Mountaineers =

Intercollegiate sports teams of Western Colorado University

- University: Western Colorado University
- Nickname: Mountaineers
- NCAA: Division II
- Conference: Rocky Mountain Athletic Conference
- Athletic director: Dr. Amber Burdge
- Location: Gunnison, Colorado
- Varsity teams: 13
- Football stadium: Mojo Field at Mountaineer Bowl at The Rady Family Sports Complex
- Basketball arena: Paul Wright Gymnasium
- Soccer stadium: Katy O. Rady Field
- Colors: Crimson and slate
- Mascot: Mad Jack
- Website: www.gomountaineers.com

The Western Colorado Mountaineers are the athletic teams that represent Western Colorado University, located in Gunnison, Colorado, in NCAA Division II intercollegiate sports. The Mountaineers compete as members of the Rocky Mountain Athletic Conference for each of the Mountaineers' 14 varsity sports.

== Facilities ==
Facilities include the 65,000-square-foot Mountaineer Field House, completed in 2014; Mountaineer Bowl (elevation 7,771 feet (2,369 m)), which was originally completed in 1949 and saw a major renovation as part of the development of The Rady Family Sports Complex in 2024; and Paul Wright Gym (elevation 7,723 feet (2,354 m)).

== Media ==
KEJJ 98.3 FM and KWSB 91.1 FM broadcasts many of Western's football, basketball and wrestling contests and those broadcasts can be heard online through KWSB.org.

Home regular-season events for football, volleyball, soccer, basketball, swimming, and wrestling are broadcast via livestream through the RMAC Network subscription PPV service.

== Varsity sports ==
The Mountaineers have collected 98 RMAC team conference championships in all sports as of 2023.

Individual National Championships since 1986 include Men's Indoor Track & Field (13 National Champions); since 1996, Women's Indoor Track & Field (8 National Champions); since 1985, Men's Outdoor Track & Field (20 National Champions); since 1987, Women's Outdoor Track & Field (25 National Champions); since 1993, Women's Cross Country (5 National Champions); since 1999, Men's Cross Country (3 National Champions); since 1963, Wrestling (16 National Champions); in 1968, Men's Swimming & Diving (1 National Champion); since 1957, Men's Skiing (7 National Champions); and since 1997, Women's Skiing (2 National Champions). Since 1963 there have been 15 national championships between the NCAA College Division, NCAA Division II, and NAIA classifications in Wrestling (2 National Championships); Women's Cross Country (4 National Championships); and Men's Cross Country (9 National Championships). Western's first conference championship in 1954 began a tradition of success that has led to 88 more Rocky Mountain Athletic Conference titles. Everett Brown earned the college's first All-America honor in 1934.

The Mountaineers have a combined 15 national team championships, 117 individual national NAIA or NCAA Division II championships, and 1,038 All-America honors since 1911.

Sports Illustrated's weekly "Faces in the Crowd" section has featured seven student-athletes, coaches, and administrators since 1959.

=== Teams ===
Men's sports

- Basketball
- Cross country
- Football
- Track & field (indoor and outdoor)
- Wrestling

Women's sports

- Basketball
- Cross country
- Soccer
- Swimming & diving
- Track & field (indoor and outdoor)
- Volleyball
- Wrestling (2026–27)

=== Track & field ===
The men's and women's indoor/outdoor track and field program in addition to the cross country program has been particularly successful, producing numerous team national championships including many individual national champions and All-Americans.

In 2016–17, Alicja Konieczek became the first Mountaineer to win four national track and field titles. She has since won four more national titles—the most by any female in Western's history.

== National championships ==
=== Team ===
Sport	Association	Division	Year	Opponent/Runner-up	Score
Men's Cross Country (9)	NCAA	Division II	1995	Central Missouri State	69–98 (-29)
Men's Cross Country (9)	NCAA	Division II	1999	Adams State	27–95 (-68)
Men's Cross Country (9)	NCAA	Division II	2000	Abilene Christian	29–62 (-33)
Men's Cross Country (9)	NCAA	Division II	2001	Abilene Christian	38–74 (-36)
Men's Cross Country (9)	NCAA	Division II	2002	Abilene Christian	35–81 (-46)
Men's Cross Country (9)	NCAA	Division II	2003	Abilene Christian	40–68 (-28)
Men's Cross Country (9)	NCAA	Division II	2004	Adams State	39–76 (-37)
Men's Cross Country (9)	NCAA	Division II	2005	Adams State	51–108 (-57)
Men's Cross Country (9)	NCAA	Division II	2011	Adams State	27–69 (-42)
Women's cross country (4)	NAIA (1)	Single	1990	Adams State	58–70 (-12)
Women's cross country (4)	NCAA (3)	Division II	2000	North Dakota	38–131 (-93)
Women's cross country (4)	NCAA (3)	Division II	2001	Adams State	46–55 (-9)
Women's cross country (4)	NCAA (3)	Division II	2002	Adams State	43–46 (-3)
Wrestling (2)	NCAA	Division II	1963	Southern Illinois	62–57 (+5)
Wrestling (2)	NCAA	Division II	1964	Colorado Mines	51–49 (+2)

== Mountain Sports and Club Sports ==
=== Mountain Sports ===
- Alpine Skiing
- Climbing
- Nordic Skiing
- Freeride Skiing and Snowboarding
- Mountain Biking
- Ski Mountaineering
- Trail Running

=== Club Sports ===
- Men's Baseball
- Men's Basketball
- Men's and Women's Boxing
- Figure Skating (co-rec)
- Men's and Women's Ice Hockey
- Men’s Lacrosse
- Men's and Women's Rugby
- Men's and Women's Soccer
- Women's Volleyball
