= WGWD =

WGWD may refer to:

- WGWD-LP, a low-power radio station (98.3 FM) licensed to Paintsville, Kentucky, United States
- WVFT, a radio station (93.3 FM) licensed to Gretna, Florida, United States which held the call sign WGWD from 1987 to 2012
- WAAX, a radio station (570 AM) licensed to Gadsden, Alabama, United States, which held the call sign WGWD from 1947 to 1955
