= KWDS =

KWDS may refer to:

- KWWD (FM), a radio station (91.3 FM) licensed to serve Canadian, Texas, United States, which held the call sign KWDS from 2021 to 2024; see List of radio stations in Texas
- KQNA, a radio station (1130 AM) licensed to serve Prescott Valley, Arizona, United States, which held the call sign KWDS from 1994 to 1994
