= KQNA =

Radio station in Prescott Valley, Arizona

- Prescott Valley, Arizona; United States
- Frequency: 1130 kHz

Programming
- Format: Talk radio
- Affiliations: Fox News Radio

Ownership
- Owner: Arizona's Hometown Radio Group; (Prescott Valley Broadcasting Co., Inc.)
- Sister stations: KDDL, KDMM, KPKR, KPPV, KXBB

History
- First air date: September 11, 1986
- Former call signs: KLKY (1984–1991); KWDS (1991–1994)

Technical information
- Licensing authority: FCC
- Facility ID: 53415
- Class: D
- Power: 1,000 watts (day); 4 watts (night)
- Transmitter coordinates: 34°37′46″N 112°18′56″W
- Translators: 95.5 K238CB (Prescott); 99.9 K260BL (Prescott)

Links
- Public license information: Public file; LMS
- Webcast: Listen live
- Website: www.kqna.com

KQNA (1130 AM) is a commercial radio station licensed to Prescott Valley, Arizona, United States. It has a talk format and is owned by the Prescott Valley Broadcasting Co. (d/b/a Arizona's Hometown Radio Group). The studios and offices are on Karicio Lane in Prescott.

KQNA is also heard on two FM translators: K260BL (99.9 FM) came into service in 2009; it is aimed at downtown Prescott and broadcasts from southwest of the city. K238CB (95.5 FM) broadcasts from Mingus Mountain toward Prescott Valley and Cottonwood and was acquired from Advance Ministries in 2016.

== History ==
The station signed on the air on September 11, 1986. While it was still a construction permit, before it was built, it got the call sign KLKY, which stood for the word "Lucky." It was owned by Lucky Communications, with R. David Carson as the president. The station was a daytimer, required to go off the air at night. It was an affiliate of the Satellite Music Network (SMN), carrying an adult standards and middle of the road (MOR) format known as "Stardust."

In 1991, it changed its call letters to KWDS. The station was assigned the KQNA call sign by the Federal Communications Commission (FCC) on January 12, 1994. It also was given permission by the FCC to broadcast around the clock but at a much lower power after sunset.

KQNA is a member of the Prescott, Prescott Valley, Chino Valley, Cottonwood-Verde Valley and Flagstaff Chambers of Commerce as well as a member of the Prescott Downtown Partnership.

== Programming ==
KQNA presents a local weekday afternoon program, Talk of the Town, featuring hosts from Chino Valley on Mondays, Prescott Valley on Tuesdays, Prescott on Wednesdays and Cottonwood/The Roundtable on Thursdays. The remainder of the schedule is nationally-syndicated conservative talk programs.

KQNA carries live sports including Arizona Cardinals football, and Arizona Diamondbacks baseball.
