= Kedi =

Kedi may refer to:

- Kedi (2006 film), an Indian Tamil-language film by Jyothi Krishna
- Kedi (2010 film), an Indian Telugu-language film by Kiran Kumar
- Kedi (2016 film), a Turkish documentary film about Istanbul street cats
- Kenneth Kedi (born 1971), Marshallese politician
- KEDI (FM), a radio station licensed to Bethel, Alaska

== See also ==
- Kedi Billa Killadi Ranga, a 2013 Indian Tamil-language film
