= KEDC =

KEDC may refer to:

- KEDC (FM), a radio station (88.5 FM) licensed to serve Hearne, Texas, United States
- Austin Executive Airport (ICAO code KEDC)
