= KITX =

Radio station in Hugo, Oklahoma

- Hugo, Oklahoma; United States
- Broadcast area: Paris, Texas
- Frequency: 95.5 MHz (HD Radio)
- Branding: K 95.5

Programming
- Format: Country
- Subchannels: HD2: KMMY simulcast (Active rock); HD3: Classic country HD4: ESPN Radio 105.1 (Sports)

Ownership
- Owner: Payne Media Group LLC
- Sister stations: KDOE, KMMY, KNNU, KZDV, KYHD, KTFX-FM, KTNT, KTLQ, KEOK, KQIK-FM, KYOA, KSTQ

History
- First air date: 1979

Technical information
- Licensing authority: FCC
- Facility ID: 26159
- Class: C2
- ERP: 50,000 watts
- HAAT: 134 meters (440 ft)
- Transmitter coordinates: 33°54′56″N 95°28′4″W
- Translator: See § Translators

Links
- Public license information: Public file; LMS
- Webcast: Listen Live
- Website: k955.com

KITX (95.5 FM) is a radio station broadcasting a country music format. Licensed to Hugo, Oklahoma, United States, the station serves the Paris, Texas area. The station is currently owned by Payne Media Group LLC and features programming from Fox News, Premiere Radio Networks.

== History ==
The very first FM station in the Paris, Texas area. The station was assigned the call sign KITX on February 7, 1983. In 2017 KITX became the very first HD station in Paris, enabling HD2, HD3, and HD4 channels HD2 Active Rock KMMY, HD3 Classic Country, and HD4 ESPN Radio 105.1.

KITX stopped broadcasting temporarily in early 2024 due to thieves knocking over the broadcasting tower to steal the copper from the tower.

== Translators ==
Call sign	Frequency	City of license	FID	ERP (W)	HAAT	Class	FCC info
K235AW	94.9 FM	Antlers, Oklahoma	147238	250	53.6 m (176 ft)	D	LMS
K286AV	105.1 FM	Paris, Texas	147253	250	31.5 m (103 ft)	D	LMS
