= XHMVM-FM =

Radio station in Maravatío, Michoacán

Maravatío, Michoacán; Mexico
- Frequency: 98.3 MHz
- Branding: Voz de Maravatío

Ownership
- Owner: Voz de Maravatío, A.C.

History
- First air date: February 3, 2016 (social concession)
- Call sign meaning: MaraVatío Michoacán

Technical information
- Class: A
- ERP: 3 kW
- HAAT: 41.4 m
- Transmitter coordinates: 19°54′41.04″N 100°32′17.77″W

XHMVM-FM is a radio station in Maravatío, Michoacán. XHMVM broadcasts on 98.3 FM and is owned by Voz de Maravatío, A.C.

== History ==
XHMVM received its social concession on February 3, 2016. The station is related to the cluster of XHETA-FM/XHLX-FM in Zitácuaro.
