= XHDT-FM =

Radio station in Ciudad Cuauhtémoc, Chihuahua

- Ciudad Cuauhtémoc, Chihuahua; Mexico
- Broadcast area: Ciudad Cuauhtémoc, Chihuahua
- Frequency: 98.3 FM
- Branding: Like 98.3 FM

Programming
- Format: Pop

Ownership
- Owner: GRD Multimedia; (Radio Divertida XEDT, S.A. de C.V.)

History
- First air date: March 27, 1989 (concession)

Technical information
- Licensing authority: CRT
- Class: B1
- ERP: 25 kW
- HAAT: 99.07 m (325.0 ft)
- Transmitter coordinates: 28°25′07″N 106°49′30″W

XHDT-FM is a radio station on 98.3 FM in Ciudad Cuauhtémoc, Chihuahua. The station is owned by GRD Multimedia and carries a pop format known as Like 98.3 FM.

== History ==
XHDT began as XEDT-AM 1080, receiving its concession on March 27, 1989. It was owned by Raúl Mendoza Villalba. On August 30, 2005, XEDT was authorized to move to 900 and increase its power from 1 to 5 kW.

XEDT was authorized to move to FM in 2011. In July 2017, it dropped the Hits name and Multimedios Radio logo, likely in preparation for MM Radio to launch its own Hits FM station in the market.
