= KMMY =

Radio station in Soper, Oklahoma

- Soper, Oklahoma; United States
- Broadcast area: Hugo, Oklahoma
- Frequency: 96.5 MHz
- Branding: My Rock 96.5

Programming
- Format: Active rock

Ownership
- Owner: Will Payne
- Sister stations: KITX, KTNT, KYOA, KSTQ, KTFX-FM, KEOK, KTLQ, KDOE, KZDV, KYHD, KNNU, KQIK-FM

History
- First air date: March 10, 2008
- Call sign meaning: "My"

Technical information
- Licensing authority: FCC
- Facility ID: 164292
- Class: A
- ERP: 3,400 watts
- HAAT: 135 meters (443 feet)
- Transmitter coordinates: 33°59′25″N 95°46′48″W
- Repeater: 95.5 KITX-HD2 (Hugo)

Links
- Public license information: Public file; LMS
- Webcast: Listen Live
- Website: myrock965.com

KMMY (96.5 FM, "My Rock 96.5") is a radio station licensed to serve Soper, Oklahoma, United States. The station is owned by Will Payne.

KMMY broadcasts an active rock and sports talk format to the greater Hugo, Oklahoma area.

Current program schedule:

- Bladerunner Radio 5a-8a M-F
- The Dan Patrick Show 8a-11a M-F
- The Rocklaholics Ride Home 3p-7p M-F
- Fox Sports Radio Programming Sundays 5a-12p

== History ==
Former logo

This station received its original construction permit from the Federal Communications Commission on March 9, 2005. The new station was assigned the call letters EGPG by the FCC on April 12, 2006. The station began broadcasting as "My Rock 96.5" on March 10, 2008. KMMY received its license to cover from the FCC on March 25, 2008.
