= KTNT (FM) =

- Eufaula, Oklahoma; United States
- Broadcast area: Eufaula, Oklahoma; McAlester, Oklahoma
- Frequency: 102.5 MHz
- Branding: 102.5 Blake FM

Programming
- Format: Country music

Ownership
- Owner: Payne Radio Group; (K95.5, Inc.)
- Sister stations: KDOE, KEOK, KITX, KMMY, KNNU, KQIK-FM, KSTQ, KTFX-FM, KTLQ, KYHD, KYOA, KZDV

History
- First air date: June 15, 1967
- Former call signs: KCES (1967–1999)
- Former frequencies: 102.3 MHz (1967–1999)

Technical information
- Licensing authority: FCC
- Facility ID: 67678
- Class: C3
- ERP: 10,500 watts
- HAAT: 154 meters (505 ft)
- Transmitter coordinates: 35.102611°N 95.614972°W
- Translator: 107.5 K298AR (McAlester)

Links
- Public license information: Public file; LMS
- Website: www.blakefm1025.com

KTNT is a radio station airing a country music format licensed to Eufaula, Oklahoma, broadcasting on 102.5 FM. The station serves the areas of Eufaula and McAlester, Oklahoma, and is owned by K95.5, Inc.

== History of call letters ==
The call letters KTNT-FM were previously assigned to a station in Tacoma, Washington. Owned by the Tribune Publishing Company, it began broadcasting October 26, 1948, on 97.3 MHz. The KTNT call sign was also used during the mid 1980s by Walton Stations, New Mexico for a station in Ruidoso, New Mexico.

== FM translator ==
Call sign	Frequency	City of license	FID	ERP (W)	HAAT	Class	Transmitter coordinates	FCC info
K298AR	107.5 FM	McAlester, Oklahoma	157289	250	49 m (161 ft)	D	34°56′0.3″N 95°46′10.9″W	LMS
