= KTFX-FM =

- Warner, Oklahoma; United States
- Broadcast area: Muskogee, Oklahoma
- Frequency: 101.7 MHz
- Branding: Okie Country 101.7

Programming
- Format: Country

Ownership
- Owner: Payne Radio Group; (K95.5, Inc)
- Sister stations: KITX, KTNT, KYOA, KSTQ, KZDV, KEOK, KTLQ, KDOE, KMMY, KYHD, KNNU, KQIK-FM

History
- First air date: March 1995
- Former call signs: KBIX (1989–1995); KRQZ (1995–1999)

Technical information
- Licensing authority: FCC
- Facility ID: 56622
- Class: C3
- ERP: 25,000 watts
- HAAT: 84 meters (276 ft)
- Transmitter coordinates: 35.57750°N 95.21000°W

Links
- Public license information: Public file; LMS
- Webcast: Listen live
- Website: okiecountry1017.com

KTFX-FM is a radio station airing a country music format licensed to Warner, Oklahoma, broadcasting on 101.7 FM. The station serves the Muskogee, Oklahoma, area, and is owned by K95.5, Inc.

== Translators ==
Call sign	Frequency	City of license	FID	ERP (W)	HAAT	Class	FCC info
K234CN	94.7 FM	Braggs, Oklahoma	157269	250	40 m (131 ft)	D	LMS
K268DG	101.5 FM	Muskogee, Oklahoma	157298	10	23 m (75 ft)	D	LMS
