= XHFP-FM =

Radio station in Jalpa, Zacatecas

- Jalpa, Zacatecas; Mexico
- Frequency: 98.3 FM
- Branding: Radio Alegría

Ownership
- Owner: Comunicación Instantánea, S.A. de C.V.

History
- First air date: November 25, 1974 (concession)

Technical information
- Class: CRT
- Power: B1
- ERP: 3 kW
- HAAT: 368.6 m (1,209 ft)
- Transmitter coordinates: 21°39′37″N 102°56′40″W

Links
- Website: radioalegria.com.mx

XHFP-FM is a radio station on 98.3 FM in Jalpa, Zacatecas, known as Radio Alegría.

== History ==
XEFP-AM 1580 received its concession on November 25, 1974, with technical tests beginning on July 18 of that year. It was owned by Jorge Humberto González Bravo and operated with 2 kW day and 250 watts at night. The station was managed by the Díaz Alonso family; the youngest of three brothers, Sergio, died at the XEFP transmitter site the next year as a result of an electric shock. In 1982, XEFP moved to 990 kHz and boosted its power to 5,000 watts (in 1985) and finally in 1989, 10 kW day and 1 kW night. January 2007 saw XEFP move to new, purpose-built facilities in Jalpa.

XEFP was cleared to move to FM in February 2011.
