= Dustin Lind =

American baseball coach

Baltimore Orioles – No. 86
- Coach
- Born: Florence, Montana, U.S.

Teams
- As coach: San Francisco Giants (2020–2023); Philadelphia Phillies (2024–2025); Baltimore Orioles (2026–present)

Dustin Lind is an American professional baseball coach who currently serves as the lead hitting coach for the Baltimore Orioles of Major League Baseball (MLB). He was formerly the director of hitting and assistant hitting coach for the San Francisco Giants. He played college baseball for Montana State University-Billings, and also attended Idaho State University.

== Early life and education ==
Lind's hometown is Florence, Montana, population 765. He attended Florence-Carlton High School in Florence, Montana, graduating in 2007. As a junior for the Bitterroot Bucs American Legion team, he batted .401 with 53 RBIs, and was named the Northwest Regional MVP.

Lind attended Montana State University-Billings where he played college baseball as an outfielder, before injuries ended his playing career there. He then transferred to Idaho State University, where he played club baseball. He graduated from ISU in 2014 with a degree in exercise science. Lind earned his doctorate in physical therapy from the University of Montana in 2017. In 2019 he received the ISU Young Alumni Award.

== Coaching career ==
From 2014 to 2017, Lind worked with MLB and minor league players as an independent hitting consultant. He also worked as an outpatient orthopedic physical therapist in Montana.

=== Seattle Mariners ===
Lind was hired by the Seattle Mariners and served as a minor league quality assurance coach in 2018. In 2019, he worked as the Mariners director of hitting development and strategies on the major league coaching staff, assisting hitters, hitting coaches, and analysts in optimizing hitting development and performance.

=== San Francisco Giants ===
On December 11, 2019, Lind was hired by the San Francisco Giants as their director of hitting and assistant hitting coach.

On November 10, 2023, the Giants announced that Lind would not be returning for the 2024 season.

=== Philadelphia Phillies ===
In 2025, Lind joined the Philadelphia Phillies as an assistant hitting coach.

=== Baltimore Orioles ===
On November 7, 2025, the Baltimore Orioles hired Lind as their lead hitting coach for the 2026 season.
