= XHMTLA-FM =

Municipal radio station in Tlatlaya, State of Mexico

Tlatlaya, State of Mexico; Mexico
- Frequency: 98.3 FM
- Branding: XHMTLA 98.3 FM, Radio Tlatlaya

Programming
- Format: Public community

Ownership
- Owner: Municipio de Tlatlaya

History
- First air date: December 1, 2018
- Call sign meaning: "Municipio de Tlatlaya"

Technical information
- Class: A
- ERP: 100 watts
- HAAT: 733.3 m
- Transmitter coordinates: 18°37′04.5″N 100°12′28.4″W

XHMTLA-FM is a public radio station on 98.3 FM, owned by the municipality of Tlatlaya, State of Mexico. The station broadcasts from studios and a transmitter located at the municipal government building.

== History ==
XHMTLA-FM's concession was awarded in 2018. The station officially came on the air December 1 after testing for nearly two months.
