= XHBF-FM =

Radio station in San Pedro, Coahuila, Mexico

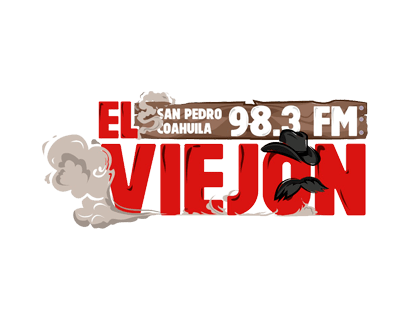
- San Pedro, Coahuila; Mexico
- Frequency: 98.3 FM
- Branding: El Viejón

Programming
- Format: Spanish Oldies
- Affiliations: Grupo Radiorama

Ownership
- Owner: Quiñonez Armendáriz and Fernandez Quiñonez family; (Radiodifusora XEBF-AM, S.A. de C.V.)
- Operator: GPS Media

History
- First air date: November 26, 1959 (concession)

Technical information
- Licensing authority: CRT
- Class: B1
- ERP: 25 kW
- HAAT: 54.81 m (179.8 ft)
- Transmitter coordinates: 25°45′25″N 102°59′50″W

Links
- Webcast: Listen live
- Website: gpsmedia.mx

XHBF-FM is a radio station on 98.3 FM in San Pedro, Coahuila, Mexico. The station is operated by GPS Media and known as El Viejón with a Spanish-language oldies format.

== History ==
XEBF-AM 1150 received its concession on November 26, 1959. Until 2015 it was owned by Radio Coahuila, S.A.

It migrated to FM in 2011. Currently, the station was affiliated with Radiorama until 2020.

In 2020 GPS Media was born, taking control of several stations including XHBF-FM. The station adopted the name of El Viejón and an old format. RCG Media took over operations in February 2021, but GPS became the operator again in November.
