= XHBAJA-FM =

Radio station in San Quintín, Baja California

- San Quintín, Baja California; Mexico
- Broadcast area: San Quintín, Baja California
- Frequency: 98.3 FM
- Branding: La Chula

Programming
- Format: Regional Mexican

Ownership
- Owner: Grupo Uvizra; (Fundación San Quintín, A.C.)

History
- First air date: August 12, 2017
- Call sign meaning: Baja California

Technical information
- Licensing authority: CRT
- Class: B
- ERP: 14 kW
- HAAT: 19.3 m (63 ft)
- Transmitter coordinates: 30°41′55.6″N 116°00′19.4″W

XHBAJA-FM is a noncommercial radio station on 98.3 FM in San Quintín, Baja California. It is owned by Fundación San Quintín, A.C., which is in turn part of Grupo Uvizra.

XHBAJA received its concession in May 2015 and was among the first radio stations to receive a social concession under Mexican broadcasting reform. It signed on August 12, 2017.
