= XHPAB-FM =

Radio station in La Paz, Baja California Sur

- La Paz, Baja California Sur; Mexico
- Frequency: 98.3 FM

Programming
- Format: Regional Mexican

Ownership
- Owner: Promomedios California; (Radio Celebridad, S.A.)

History
- First air date: October 9, 1996 (concession)
- Former frequencies: 1080 kHz
- Call sign meaning: From "La Paz, BCS"

Technical information
- Licensing authority: CRT
- Class: B
- ERP: 25 kW
- HAAT: 103.1 m (338 ft)
- Transmitter coordinates: 24°06′25″N 110°30′00″W

XHPAB-FM is a Mexican radio station that serves the region around La Paz, Baja California Sur.

It formerly broadcast on 1080 kHz as XEPAB-AM. XEPAB migrated to FM in 2010.
