= KQIK-FM =

Radio Station in Haileyville, Oklahoma

- Haileyville, Oklahoma; United States
- Broadcast area: Haileyville, Oklahoma
- Frequency: 105.9 MHz
- Branding: Country Legends 105.9

Programming
- Format: Country

Ownership
- Owner: Payne Media Group (Will Payne)
- Sister stations: KITX, KTNT, KZDV, KYHD, KSTQ, KTFX-FM, KEOK, KTLQ, KDOE, KMMY, KYOA, KNNU

Technical information
- Licensing authority: FCC
- Facility ID: 183380
- Class: A
- ERP: 6,000 watts
- HAAT: 69 meters (226 ft)
- Transmitter coordinates: 34°50′44″N 95°34′46″W

Links
- Public license information: Public file; LMS
- Website: k955.com/payneradiogroup/

KQIK-FM (105.9 MHz) is a radio station licensed to Haileyville, Oklahoma, United States. The station is currently owned by Payne Media Group and broadcasts a Country music format. It brands as "Country Legends 105.9" and operates at 6,000 watts, making it a class A station.

The studios are off W Jackson Hugo, and the transmitter is at 34° 50' 44" N, 95° 34' 47" W.

== History ==
This station was assigned call sign KQIK on November 19, 2012. Will Payne inherited the station in April 2015.
