= KYOA =

- Kiowa, Oklahoma; United States
- Frequency: 98.7 MHz

Programming
- Format: Country

Ownership
- Owner: K95.5 Inc
- Sister stations: KITX, KTNT, KZDV, KYHD, KSTQ, KTFX, KEOK, KTLQ, KDOE, KMMY, KNNU, KQIK

Technical information
- Licensing authority: FCC
- Facility ID: 183381
- Class: A
- ERP: 900 watts
- HAAT: 64 meters (210 ft)
- Transmitter coordinates: 34°43′28″N 95°54′56″W

Links
- Public license information: Public file; LMS
- Website: http://www.blakefm1025.com/

KYOA (98.7 FM) is a radio station licensed to Kiowa, Oklahoma, United States. The station is currently owned by K95.5 Inc

== History ==
This station was assigned call sign KYOA on March 22, 2013.
