= XHLI-FM (Tabasco) =

Radio station in Villahermosa, Tabasco, Mexico

- Villahermosa, Tabasco; Mexico
- Frequency: 98.3 MHz
- Branding: Radio Mexicana

Programming
- Format: Grupera

Ownership
- Owner: Valanci Media Group (Grupo Radio Digital); (Estéreo Sistema, S.A.)

History
- First air date: 1992
- Call sign meaning: Original concessionaire Luis Illán Torralba

Technical information
- ERP: 9,300 watts
- Transmitter coordinates: 17°58′25.6″N 92°55′56.68″W

XHLI-FM is a radio station on 98.3 FM in Villahermosa, Tabasco, Mexico. It is owned by Valanci Media Group (Grupo Radio Digital) and broadcasts a grupera format known as Radio Mexicana.

== History ==
The original concession for XHLI was obtained on September 23, 1992, by Luis Illán Torralba, a longtime radio announcer in Villahermosa. The station was initially known as "98.3 LI FM". In 2005, Grupo Radio Digital became the concessionaire and adopted the national La Mejor grupera format from MVS Radio.

On May 1, 2021, most of GRD's stations dropped their MVS Radio franchised brands. XHLI remained a grupera station and adopted the "Radio Mexicana" name, similar to its sister station XHONC-FM in Tuxtla Gutiérrez.
