= KGOS =

- Torrington, Wyoming; United States
- Frequency: 1490 kHz

Programming
- Format: Country music
- Affiliations: ABC News Radio

Ownership
- Owner: Kath Broadcasting Co.
- Sister stations: KERM

Technical information
- Licensing authority: FCC
- Facility ID: 46738
- Class: C
- Power: 1,000 watts (unlimited)
- Transmitter coordinates: 42°4′20″N 104°13′40″W

Links
- Public license information: Public file; LMS
- Website: kgoskerm.com; goconow.com

KGOS (1490 AM) is a radio station broadcasting a country music format. It is licensed to Torrington, Wyoming, United States. The station is currently owned by Kath Broadcasting, and features programming from ABC News Radio.

== History ==
The station went on the air as KGOS.
