= KZDV =

- Rattan, Oklahoma; United States
- Frequency: 99.5 MHz

Programming
- Format: Contemporary Christian

Ownership
- Owner: Will Payne
- Sister stations: KITX, KTNT, KYOA, KSTQ, KTFX-FM, KEOK, KTLQ, KDOE, KMMY, KYHD, KNNU, KQIK-FM

Technical information
- Licensing authority: FCC
- Facility ID: 189574
- Class: A
- ERP: 6,000 watts
- HAAT: 38 meters (125 ft)
- Transmitter coordinates: 34°9′24″N 95°24′56″W

Links
- Public license information: Public file; LMS
- Website: http://www.k955.com/kzdv/

KZDV (99.5 FM) is a radio station licensed to Rattan, Oklahoma, United States. The station is currently owned by Will Payne.

== History ==
This station was assigned call sign KZDV on November 19, 2012.
