= XHCJ-FM =

Radio station in Apatzingán, Michoacán, Mexico

- Apatzingán, Michoacán; Mexico
- Frequency: 94.3 MHz
- Branding: La Ke Buena

Programming
- Format: Regional Mexican
- Affiliations: Cadena RASA, Radiópolis

Ownership
- Owner: Grupo Radio Apatzingán; (Manuel Flores y Compañía, S. de N.C.)
- Sister stations: XHAPM-FM/XEAPM-AM, XHEML-FM

History
- First air date: October 18, 1952; 1994 (FM)
- Former call signs: XECJ-AM
- Former frequencies: 1340 kHz, 970 kHz

Technical information
- ERP: 10 kW

Links
- Webcast: Listen live
- Website: cadenarasa.com

XHCJ-FM is a radio station on 94.3 FM in Apatzingán, Michoacán. It is owned by Grupo Radio Apatzingán, a subsidiary of Cadena RASA, and carries the La Ke Buena Regional Mexican format from Radiópolis.

== History ==
XECJ-AM received its concession on July 21, 1952, and signed on October 18 of that year. The station initially broadcast on 1340 kHz and was soon relocated to 970; it has been held by the same concessionaire since signing on.

It became an AM-FM combo in 1994.

On January 1, 2021, XECJ-XHCJ dropped the Los 40 Principales pop format from Radiópolis and became known as "La CJ" with a flip to a Spanish-language adult hits format. On May 1, it changed again to simulcast RASA pop station XHLY-FM "2021 FM" in Morelia. In February 2022, the station returned to a Radiópolis brand format, using the Ke Buena Regional Mexican franchise.

On February 23, 2022, the station ceased broadcasting on AM.
