= WSVZ =

Coordinates: 39.2800°N 88.9728°W

- Tower Hill, Illinois; United States
- Broadcast area: Shelbyville, Illinois/Pana, Illinois
- Frequency: 98.3 MHz
- Branding: New Country 98.3

Programming
- Format: Country

Ownership
- Owner: Randal Miller; (Miller Communications, Inc.)

History
- First air date: November 25, 1997 (as WRAN)
- Former call signs: WRAN (1997–2014)

Technical information
- Licensing authority: FCC
- Facility ID: 78691
- Class: A
- ERP: 3,700 watts
- HAAT: 128 meters (420 ft)

Links
- Public license information: Public file; LMS
- Website: WSVZ Online

WSVZ (98.3 FM) is a radio station licensed to Tower Hill, Illinois. WSVZ airs a country music format and is owned by Randal Miller, through licensee Miller Communications, Inc.
