= XHRAF-FM =

Radio station in Rafael Delgado, Veracruz, Mexico

Rafael Delgado, Veracruz; Mexico
- Broadcast area: Córdoba-Orizaba
- Frequency: 98.3 FM
- Branding: Radio Banana

Programming
- Format: Cultural

Ownership
- Owner: Cultura es lo Nuestro, A.C.; (XHCAY-FM: Comunidad, Educación y Valores, A.C.)

History
- First air date: 2017
- Call sign meaning: RAFael Delgado

Technical information
- Class: A
- Repeater(s): XHCAY-FM 102.9 Acayucan

Links
- Webcast: Listen live
- Website: radiobanana.com.mx

XHRAF-FM is a noncommercial radio station on 98.3 FM in Rafael Delgado, Veracruz, Mexico. It is owned by Cultura es lo Nuestro, A.C. and known as Radio Banana.

XHRAF is simulcast on XHCAY-FM 102.9 in Acayucan.

== History ==
The social concessions for XHRAF and XHCAY were approved on July 1, 2016. The stations began broadcasting at the end of 2017.
