= KTLQ =

- Tahlequah, Oklahoma; United States
- Frequency: 1350 kHz
- Branding: Billy Country 96.3 & 1350

Programming
- Format: Classic Country

Ownership
- Owner: Payne 5 Communications, LLC
- Sister stations: KITX, KTNT, KYOA, KSTQ, KTFX-FM, KEOK, KDOE, KMMY, KZDV, KYHD, KNNU, KQIK

History
- First air date: 1957

Technical information
- Licensing authority: FCC
- Facility ID: 16567
- Class: D
- Power: 1,000 watts day 61 watts night
- Transmitter coordinates: 35.89528°N 94.95333°W
- Translators: (93.3 MHz) K227DG (Muskogee); 96.3 K242CK (Tahlequah)

Links
- Public license information: Public file; LMS
- Website: KTLQ Online

KTLQ 1350 AM is a radio station licensed to Tahlequah, Oklahoma. The station broadcasts a classic country format and is owned by Payne 5 Communications, LLC.

== Translators ==
| Call sign | Frequency | City of license | FID | ERP (W) | HAAT | Class | FCC info |
|---|---|---|---|---|---|---|---|
| K227DG | (93.3 MHz) FM | Muskogee, Oklahoma | 201679 | 15 | 139 m (456 ft) | D | LMS |
| K242CK | (96.3 MHz) FM | Tahlequah, Oklahoma | 156847 | 250 | 67.5 m (221 ft) | D | LMS |
