= KNNU =

Radio station in Antlers, Oklahoma

- Antlers, Oklahoma; United States
- Broadcast area: Hugo, Oklahoma
- Frequency: 92.3 MHz
- Branding: Country Legends 92.3

Programming
- Format: Country

Ownership
- Owner: Payne 1 Communications LLC
- Sister stations: KITX, KTNT, KZDV, KYHD, KSTQ, KTFX, KEOK, KTLQ, KDOE, KMMY, KYOA, KQIK

Technical information
- Licensing authority: FCC
- Facility ID: 165989
- Class: C2
- ERP: 27,000 watts
- HAAT: 36 meters (118 ft)
- Transmitter coordinates: 34°14′30″N 95°44′37″W

Links
- Public license information: Public file; LMS
- Website: http://k955.com/payneradiogroup/images/kqik/KQIK-KNNU%20coverage%20map.jpg

KNNU (92.3 FM) is a radio station licensed to Antlers, Oklahoma, United States. The station is currently owned by Payne 1 Communications LLC.

== History ==
This station was assigned call sign KNNU on December 17, 2009.
