= XHAPM-FM =

Radio station in Apatzingán, Michoacán

- Apatzingán, Michoacán; Mexico
- Frequency: 95.1 MHz
- Branding: Candela

Programming
- Format: Regional Mexican
- Affiliations: Cadena RASA

Ownership
- Owner: Grupo Radio Apatzingán; (José Laris Rodríguez)
- Sister stations: XHCJ-FM, XHEML-FM

History
- First air date: March 16, 1990 (concession); 1994 (FM)
- Former call signs: XEAPM-AM (1990–2022)
- Former frequencies: 1340 kHz (1990–2022)
- Call sign meaning: Apatzingán, Michoacán

Technical information
- ERP: 10 kW

Links
- Website: www.rasa-apatzingan.com

XHAPM-FM is a radio station on 95.1 FM in Apatzingán, Michoacán. It is jointly owned by Grupo Radio Apatzingán and José Laris Rodríguez, the president of Cadena RASA, and carries a Regional Mexican format known as Candela.

== History ==
XEAPM-AM 1340 received its concession on March 16, 1990. It became an AM-FM combo in 1994. The AM frequency was surrendered by letter to the Federal Telecommunications Institute on February 3, 2022.
