= XHEML-FM =

Radio station in Apatzingán, Michoacán, Mexico

- Apatzingán, Michoacán; Mexico
- Frequency: 98.3 FM
- Branding: La Ranchera

Programming
- Format: Ranchera

Ownership
- Owner: Cadena RASA; (XEML, S.A.)
- Sister stations: XHCJ-FM, XHAPM-FM/XEAPM-AM

History
- First air date: November 29, 1961 (concession)

Technical information
- ERP: 25 kW
- Transmitter coordinates: 19°03′42.8″N 102°20′29.14″W

Links
- Webcast: Listen live
- Website: cadenarasa.com

XHEML-FM is a radio station on 98.3 FM in Apatzingán, Michoacán, Mexico. It is known as La Ranchera.

== History ==
XEML-AM received its concession on November 29, 1961. It was owned by Esperanza Murguia de Navarro and broadcast with 250 watts as a daytimer on 770 kHz. XEML was sold to a corporation in 1971. It raised its daytime power to 1 kW in the 1980s and then to 5 kW day and 1 kW night in the 1990s.

XEML received approval to migrate to FM in 2011.
