= KDME-LP =

- Fort Madison, Iowa; United States
- Frequency: 98.3 MHz

Programming
- Format: religious

Ownership
- Owner: Divine Mercy Educational Radio Association

Technical information
- Licensing authority: FCC
- Facility ID: 133439
- Class: L1
- ERP: 100 watts
- HAAT: −2.9 m (−10 ft)
- Transmitter coordinates: 40°38′14″N 91°20′28″W

Links
- Public license information: LMS

KDME-LP (98.3 FM) is a radio station licensed to Fort Madison, Iowa, United States. The station is currently owned by Divine Mercy Educational Radio Association.
