= Tower Hill, Illinois =

Tower Hill
- Village
- Location of Tower Hill in Shelby County, Illinois.
- Coordinates: 39°23′12″N 88°57′33″W
- Country: United States
- State: Illinois
- County: Shelby

Area
  - Total: 1.00 sq mi (2.60 km^{2})
  - Land: 1.00 sq mi (2.60 km^{2})
  - Water: 0 sq mi (0.00 km^{2})
- Elevation: 653 ft (199 m)

Population (2020)
  - Total: 485
  - Density: 482.5/sq mi (186.31/km^{2})
- Time zone: UTC-6 (CST)
  - Summer (DST): UTC-5 (CDT)
- ZIP code: 62571
- Area code: 217
- FIPS code: 17-75848
- GNIS ID: 2399998

Tower Hill is a village in Shelby County, Illinois, United States. The population was 485 at the 2020 census, down from 611 in 2010.

== History ==
Tower Hill was originally surveyed by Elias Smith in June, 1857 and a post office was soon opened. A mill was built in 1863 and was the main source of income for the settlement's economy. Tower Hill was incorporated as a village in 1872.

The large railroad depot in the neighboring city of Shelbyville spurred an increase in population by the turn of the 20th-century.

== Geography ==
According to the 2010 census, Tower Hill has a total area of 1.01 square miles (2.62 km^{2}), all land.

== Demographics ==
Historical population
Census	Pop.	Note	%±
1880	391		—
1890	543		38.9%
1900	615		13.3%
1910	1,040		69.1%
1920	769		−26.1%
1930	642		−16.5%
1940	697		8.6%
1950	784		12.5%
1960	700		−10.7%
1970	683		−2.4%
1980	715		4.7%
1990	601		−15.9%
2000	609		1.3%
2010	611		0.3%
2020	485		−20.6%
U.S. Decennial Census

As of the census of 2000, there were 609 people, 232 households, and 170 families residing in the village. The population density was 607.1 inhabitants per square mile (234.4/km^{2}). There were 256 housing units at an average density of 255.2 per square mile (98.5/km^{2}). The racial makeup of the village was 98.52% White, 0.33% Native American, and 1.15% from two or more races. Hispanic or Latino of any race were 0.33% of the population.

There were 232 households, out of which 32.3% had children under the age of 18 living with them, 56.5% were married couples living together, 10.8% had a female householder with no husband present, and 26.3% were non-families. 22.8% of all households were made up of individuals, and 12.9% had someone living alone who was 65 years of age or older. The average household size was 2.63 and the average family size was 3.03.

In the village, the population was spread out, with 28.2% under the age of 18, 8.4% from 18 to 24, 29.6% from 25 to 44, 19.4% from 45 to 64, and 14.4% who were 65 years of age or older. The median age was 34 years. For every 100 females, there were 89.7 males. For every 100 females age 18 and over, there were 96.8 males.

The median income for a household in the village was $30,909, and the median income for a family was $35,500. Males had a median income of $26,136 versus $20,625 for females. The per capita income for the village was $14,208. About 13.1% of families and 16.7% of the population were below the poverty line, including 21.9% of those under age 18 and 14.8% of those age 65 or over.
