= Florence, Montana =

- Census-designated place
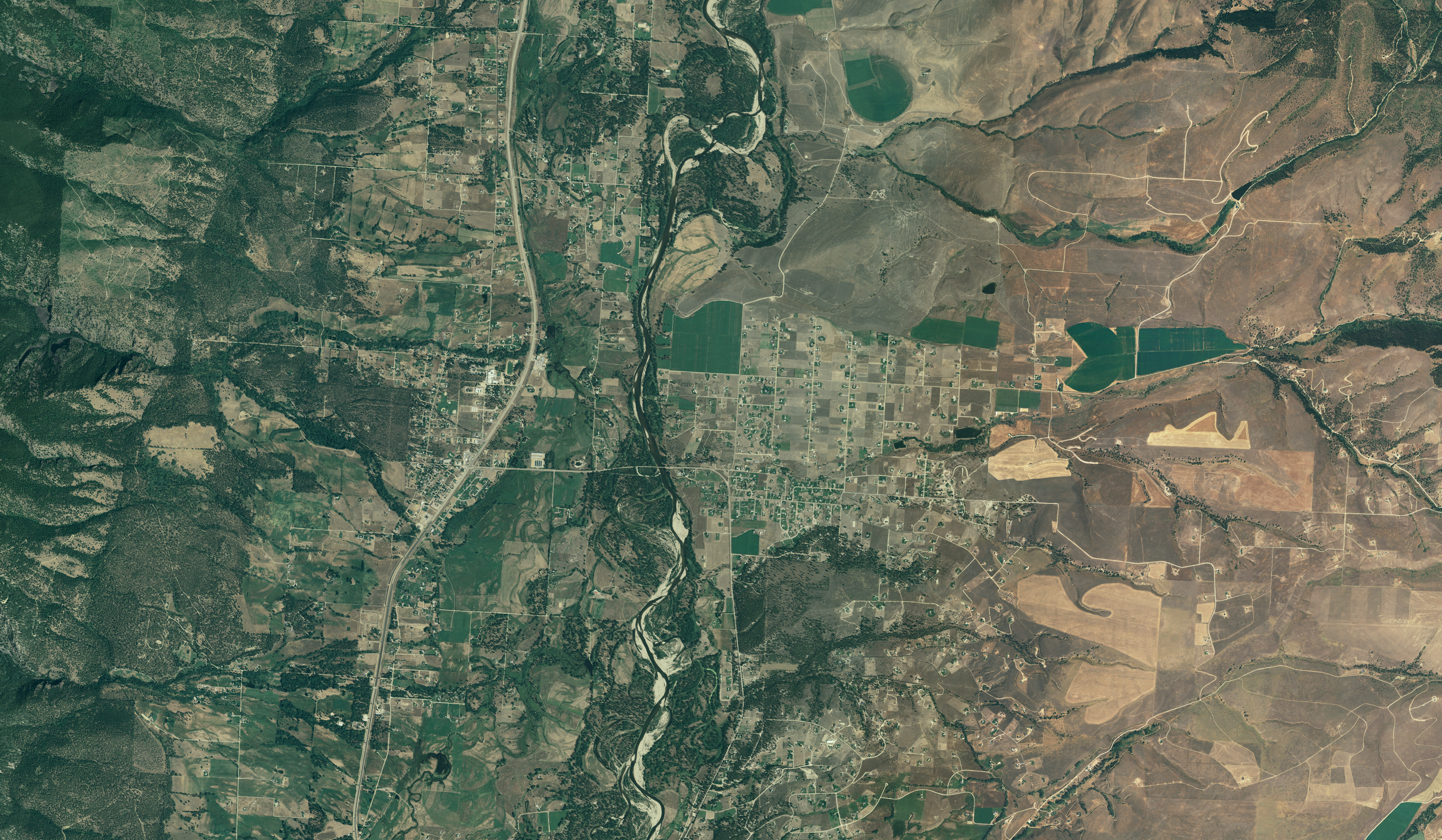
- US FSA aerial photograph of Florence in 2005

- Location of Florence, Montana
- Coordinates: 46°37′40″N 114°05′02″W
- Country: United States
- State: Montana
- County: Ravalli

Area
  - Total: 0.77 sq mi (1.99 km^{2})
  - Land: 0.77 sq mi (1.99 km^{2})
  - Water: 0 sq mi (0.00 km^{2})
- Elevation: 3,284 ft (1,001 m)

Population (2020)
  - Total: 821
  - Density: 1,069.0/sq mi (412.74/km^{2})
- Time zone: UTC-7 (Mountain (MST))
  - Summer (DST): UTC-6 (MDT)
- ZIP code: 59833
- Area code: 406
- FIPS code: 30-26950
- GNIS feature ID: 2408217

Florence (Salish: čp̓úƛ̓us) is a census-designated place (CDP) in Ravalli County, Montana. County Line Rd is on the northern edge of the city limits dividing it from Missoula County, Montana. The population was 821 at the 2020 census.

== History ==
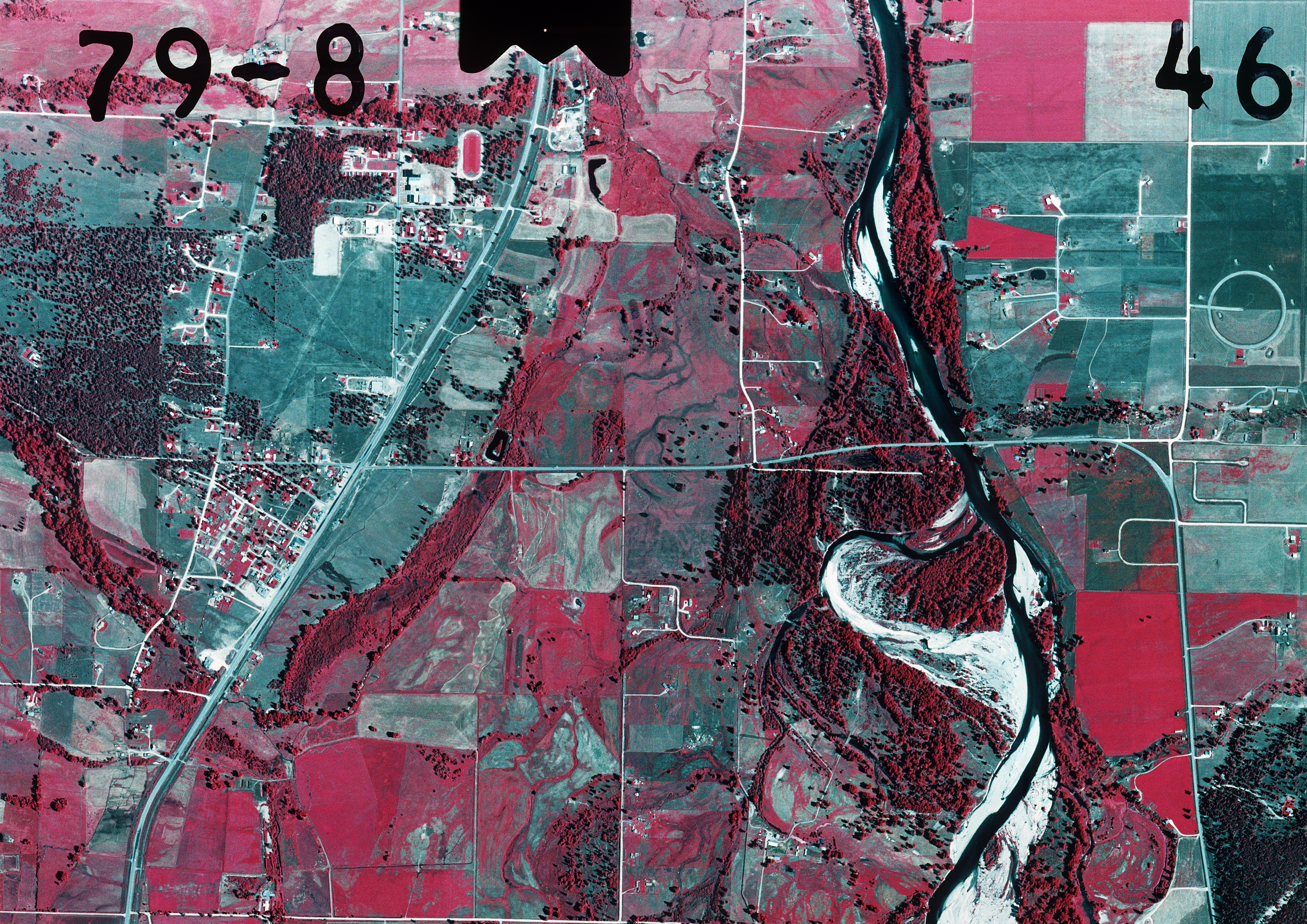
USGS aerial photograph of Florence in 1982

Florence was named for Florence Abbott Hammond, wife of A. B. Hammond, a lumber baron. He was instrumental in securing a branch of the Northern Pacific Railway in the Bitterroot Valley. The railway was immensely important in developing the lumber industry and apple production in the 1910s.

== Geography ==
Florence is located between the Sapphire and Bitterroot Mountains. The Bitterroot River is to the east. The Threemile Wildlife Management Area, about 15 miles (24 km) east, provides a winter range habitat for big game.

According to the United States Census Bureau, the CDP has a total area of 0.77 square miles (2.0 km^{2}), all land.

== Demographics ==
Historical population
Census	Pop.	Note	%±
2020	821		—
U.S. Decennial Census

As of the census of 2000, there were 901 people, 323 households, and 266 families residing in the CDP. The population density was 190.7 inhabitants per square mile (73.6/km^{2}). There were 336 housing units at an average density of 71.1 per square mile (27.5/km^{2}). The racial makeup of the CDP was 96.12% White, 1.44% Native American, 0.11% Asian, 0.44% Pacific Islander, and 1.89% from two or more races. Hispanic or Latino of any race were 1.89% of the population.

There were 323 households, out of which 39.3% had children under the age of 18 living with them, 70.6% were married couples living together, 8.7% had a female householder with no husband present, and 17.6% were non-families. 14.6% of all households were made up of individuals, and 5.3% had someone living alone who was 65 years of age or older. The average household size was 2.79 and the average family size was 3.07.

In the CDP, the population was spread out, with 29.3% under the age of 18, 5.3% from 18 to 24, 28.4% from 25 to 44, 28.5% from 45 to 64, and 8.4% who were 65 years of age or older. The median age was 37 years. For every 100 females, there were 93.8 males. For every 100 females age 18 and over, there were 96.0 males.

The median income for a household in the CDP was $39,286, and the median income for a family was $47,946. Males had a median income of $29,219 versus $20,795 for females. The per capita income for the CDP was $17,626. About 9.2% of families and 17.3% of the population were below the poverty line, including 29.3% of those under age 18 and 19.6% of those age 65 or over.

== Recreation ==
The Bitterroot River is a Blue Ribbon fishery. A popular river for fly fishing, the river has native westslope cutthroat trout and bull trout.

The Threemile Wildlife Management Area has wildlife viewing and hunting opportunities. Animals include bobcats, elk, mule deer, and various raptors.

== Education ==
It is in the Florence-Carlton K-12 Schools school district. The Florence-Carlton School District educates students from kindergarten through 12th grade. In the 2021-2022 school year a total of 813 students were enrolled. Florence-Carlton High School's team name is the Falcons.

== Media ==
The FM radio station KDTR is licensed in Florence. It plays an adult alternative format.

== Infrastructure ==
US Route 93 passes through town from north to south.

The nearest commercial airport is Missoula Montana Airport, 23 miles (37 km) north.

== Notable people ==
- Dustin Lind, assistant coach for the San Francisco Giants
- Jim Tyack, Major League Baseball player
