= CIAX-FM =

Radio station in Windsor, Quebec

Coordinates: 45°34′22″N 71°59′46″W

Windsor, Quebec; Canada
- Frequency: 98.3 MHz
- Branding: CIAX 98,3 FM

Programming
- Language: French
- Format: community radio

Ownership
- Owner: Carrefour jeunesse emploi-Comté Johnson

History
- First air date: 2001

Technical information
- Class: A
- ERP: 426 W
- HAAT: −30 metres (−98 ft)

Links
- Website: www.ciaxfm.net

CIAX-FM is a French language community radio station that operates at 98.3 FM in Windsor, Quebec, Canada.

Owned by Carrefour jeunesse emploi-Comté Johnson, the station received CRTC approval in 2000.
