= WPBV-LP =

Radio station in Palm Beach, Florida

- Palm Beach, Florida; United States
- Broadcast area: West Palm Beach
- Frequency: 98.3 MHz
- Branding: WPBV Radio

Programming
- Language: English
- Format: Catholic radio
- Affiliations: EWTN Radio

Ownership
- Owner: Coastal Frequencies Inc.

History
- First air date: 2015; 11 years ago

Technical information
- Licensing authority: FCC
- Facility ID: 197649
- Class: L1
- ERP: 54 watts
- HAAT: 41 meters (135 ft)
- Transmitter coordinates: 26.8372°N 80.1039°W

Links
- Public license information: LMS
- Webcast: Listen live
- Website: wpbvradio.com

WPBV-LP (98.3 FM) is a radio station licensed to serve the community of Palm Beach, Florida. The station is owned by Coastal Frequencies Inc., and airs a Catholic radio format, including programming from EWTN Radio.

The station was assigned the WPBV-LP call letters by the Federal Communications Commission on January 30, 2015.
