= KDOE =

Radio station in Antlers, Oklahoma

- Antlers, Oklahoma; United States
- Broadcast area: Southeastern Oklahoma
- Frequency: 102.3 MHz
- Branding: KDOE 102.3

Programming
- Format: Adult contemporary

Ownership
- Owner: Will Payne
- Sister stations: KMMY, KITX, KTNT, KYOA, KSTQ, KTFX-FM, KEOK, KTLQ, KZDV, KYHD, KNNU, KQIK-FM

History
- First air date: September 27, 2006

Technical information
- Licensing authority: FCC
- Facility ID: 164291
- Class: A
- ERP: 3,300 watts
- HAAT: 85 meters (279 ft)
- Transmitter coordinates: 34°13′35″N 95°37′20″W

Links
- Public license information: Public file; LMS
- Webcast: Listen Live
- Website: kdoe1023.com

KDOE (102.3 FM) is a radio station broadcasting an adult contemporary music format. It is licensed to Antlers, Oklahoma, United States. The station is currently owned by Will Payne.
