= KXBB =

Radio station in Cienega Springs, Arizona covering Colorado River Communities

- Cienega Springs, Arizona; United States
- Frequency: 101.7 MHz
- Branding: Badass Blues

Programming
- Format: The Only Blues Format in Arizona

Ownership
- Owner: Sanford and Terry Cohen; (River Rat Radio, LLC)
- Sister stations: KDMM, KPKR

Technical information
- Licensing authority: FCC
- Facility ID: 198736
- Class: B1
- ERP: 1,650 watts
- HAAT: 200 meters (660 ft)
- Transmitter coordinates: 34°18′39″N 114°10′11″W

Links
- Public license information: Public file; LMS
- Webcast: Listen Live
- Website: Official Website

KXBB (101.7 FM) is a radio station licensed to serve the community of Cienega Springs, Arizona. Its coverage area stretches from Quartzsite to Parker to Parker Dam to Lake Havasu City, Arizona. The station is known as Badass Blues and features the only 24 hour all blues format in Arizona. KXBB is owned by Sanford and Terry Cohen, through licensee River Rat Radio, LLC, and are the creators of the Badass Blues playlist. The station streams on dozens of websites, primarily on www.TheBlues101.com and is a member of the Memphis, TN based Blues Foundation. Sanford Cohen sits on the board of directors of the Arizona Blues Hall of Fame.

KXBB is a member of the Parker, Lake Havasu City and Needles, CA Chambers of Commerce and supports the Lake Havasu Marine Association and Lake Havasu Hospitality Association.

The station was assigned the KXBB call letters by the Federal Communications Commission on January 7, 2019.
