= KFWG-LP =

- Clinton, Oklahoma; United States
- Broadcast area: Clinton, Oklahoma
- Frequency: 98.3 MHz

Programming
- Format: Catholic

Ownership
- Owner: Universal Truth Radio, LTD

History
- First air date: 2017

Technical information
- Licensing authority: FCC
- Facility ID: 196065
- Class: LP1
- ERP: 100 watts
- HAAT: 3.55 meters (11.6 ft)
- Transmitter coordinates: 35°33′41″N 98°57′56″W

Links
- Public license information: LMS
- Website: http://www.okcr.org

KFWG-LP (98.3 FM) is a low-power FM radio station licensed to Clinton, Oklahoma, United States. The station is currently owned by Universal Truth Radio, LTD

== History ==
The station call sign KFWG-LP on February 25, 2014.
