= WHAY =

- Whitley City, Kentucky; United States
- Frequency: 98.3 MHz
- Branding: (Hay) 98 Free Range Radio!

Programming
- Format: Americana
- Affiliations: Kentucky News Network

Ownership
- Owner: H L COM, INC (Linda Lavender, Administrator)

History
- First air date: December 1, 1990; 35 years ago
- Former call signs: DWHAY (June–September 1992)
- Former frequencies: 105.9 MHz (1992-2000)

Technical information
- Licensing authority: FCC
- Facility ID: 67124
- Class: A
- ERP: 5.1 kW = 5,100 watts
- HAAT: 108.0 metres (354.3 ft)
- Transmitter coordinates: 36°39′40″N 84°26′53″W

Links
- Public license information: Public file; LMS
- Website: hay98.com

WHAY (98.3 FM) is a radio station licensed to and located in Whitley City, Kentucky playing a full-service format. The station is owned by H L Com, Inc. (Linda Lavender, Administrator).

== History ==
The Federal Communications Commission has granted the construction permit for WHAY on November 29, 1989. The station signed on the air one year and two days later, on December 1, 1990, initially operating at 105.9 megahertz with 3,000 watts of power.

WHAY is the successor station in McCreary County after WEQO (1220 kHz) permanently went off the air in 1992 after 17 years on the air as a country station. Ownership of the AM station's assets was purchased by the management of WHAY, but the WEQO license was already deleted from the FCC's records. On June 12, 1992, the station went off the air temporarily, but returned to the air three months later.

In 2000, in addition to a power increase, the station moved to its current frequency of 98.3 megahertz. Along with that, the station began broadcasting its Americana format, with a variety of music such as bluegrass, country, and rock oldies.

== Programming ==
The station consist of many shows. Some of which include Swap-n-Shop, Eclectic Circus, Americana Masters, Country Turnpike, Grateful Dead Hour and many others! The station plays an eclectic mix from Americana to classic country, bluegrass, blues and rock music.

The Kentucky News Network provides hourly news updates.
