= KYHD (FM) =

- Valliant, Oklahoma; United States
- Broadcast area: Idabel, Oklahoma
- Frequency: 94.7 MHz
- Branding: HD 94.7

Programming
- Format: Classic country

Ownership
- Owner: Payne Radio Group; (Payne, Will)
- Sister stations: KITX, KTNT, KYOA, KSTQ, KTFX, KEOK, KTLQ, KDOE, KMMY, KZDV, KNNU, KQIK

Technical information
- Licensing authority: FCC
- Facility ID: 189575
- Class: C3
- ERP: 25,000 watts
- HAAT: 70 meters (230 ft)
- Transmitter coordinates: 33°59′44.3″N 95°03′27.5″W

Links
- Public license information: (FM) Public file; LMS
- Website: hd947.com/

KYHD is an FM Radio station licensed to Valliant, Oklahoma. KYHD has a Classic country format and broadcasts on a frequency of 94.7 MHz. The format is known as HD 94.7.
