= KCDM-LP =

- Burlington, Iowa; United States
- Frequency: 98.3 MHz

Ownership
- Owner: Burlington Educational Association

Technical information
- Licensing authority: FCC
- Facility ID: 133404
- Class: L1
- ERP: 100 watts
- HAAT: 30.0 meters (98.4 ft)
- Transmitter coordinates: 40°48′44″N 91°6′49″W

Links
- Public license information: LMS
- Website: http://www.kcdmradio.org/

KCDM-LP (98.3 FM) is a radio station licensed to Burlington, Iowa, United States. The station is currently owned by Burlington Educational Association.
