= KEPX =

Radio station in Eagle Pass, Texas

Coordinates: 28.657°N 100.417°W

- Eagle Pass, Texas; United States
- Broadcast area: Eagle Pass, Texas and Piedras Negras, Coahuila
- Frequency: 89.5 (MHz)
- Branding: Radio Manantial

Programming
- Format: Spanish language Christian radio

Ownership
- Owner: World Radio Network, Inc.
- Sister stations: KEPI

History
- Call sign meaning: Eagle Pass

Technical information
- Licensing authority: FCC
- Facility ID: 73753
- Class: C1
- ERP: 52,000 Watts
- HAAT: 78 meters (256 ft)

Links
- Public license information: Public file; LMS
- Webcast: Listen live
- Website: http://www.kepx.org

KEPX is a Spanish language Christian radio station based in Eagle Pass, Texas. The World Radio Network, Inc. radio station broadcasts at 89.5 MHz with an ERP of 52,000 Watts.

== FM Translator ==
An FM translator extends coverage of KEPX into the Del Rio, Texas area.

Broadcast translator for KEPX
Call sign	Frequency	City of license	FID	ERP (W)	Class	FCC info
K236BL	95.1 FM	Del Rio, Texas	141067	26	D	LMS
