= WZZY =

Coordinates: 40.090°N 84.937°W

- Winchester, Indiana; United States
- Broadcast area: Richmond, Indiana
- Frequency: 98.3 MHz
- Branding: Star 98.3

Programming
- Format: Adult contemporary

Ownership
- Owner: Rodgers Broadcasting (Whitewater Broadcasting)

History
- First air date: 1967; 59 years ago (as WIUC)
- Former call signs: WIUC (1967–1980)

Technical information
- Licensing authority: FCC
- Facility ID: 71415
- Class: A
- ERP: 3,000 watts
- HAAT: 91 meters

Links
- Public license information: Public file; LMS
- Webcast: Listen Live
- Website: todaysmusicmix.com

WZZY is a local radio station in Winchester, Indiana. The station is located on 98.3 on the FM dial and broadcasts at an effective radiated power of 3,000 watts. Studios and offices are located at the Whitewater Broadcasting complex on West Main Street in Richmond, Indiana. The tower is located in rural Randolph County off US 27, north of Lynn, Indiana, and WZZY still conducts a lot of business out of an office in downtown Winchester.

== History ==
WZZY was founded in 1967 as WIUC (for "Winchester Indiana and Union City") switching to the WZZY calls in 1980. Its original studios, office and transmitting tower were located at the intersection of U.S. Route 27 and East Greenville Pike. middle of the road programming was aired until 1979 when it switched to adult contemporary before the call letter and format switch in 1980. Joe Hill, now of Tucson AZ was Operations/Sales Manager and did the morning drive show from 1983 to 1985. Throughout the 1980s and early 1990s, WZZY broadcast mainly a Contemporary hit radio format from 5am to midnight daily. In the mid-1990s, the station changed its format to a very broad mix of country, pop, adult contemporary, and classic rock as well as programming blocks similar to those that could be found on a public radio station. WZZY began using the on-air handle as "Wizzy 98.3". The eclectic format continued until the station was sold to Richmond's Whitewater Broadcasting in 1999. While the main headquarters are in Richmond, WZZY still has an office in downtown Winchester. Re-imaged as "Star 98-point-3," the station officially switched to an Adult contemporary format broadcasting 24 hours a day. During the Christmas season, WZZY broadcasts an all-Christmas music format. WZZY carries Randolph County high school sports, news, and weather. WZZY also features Brownfield Ag News and Purdue Sports.

== Hacking Incident ==
On February 28, 2017, WZZY was hacked in a nearly-identical manner, playing the same "dead bodies" audio from a February 2013 hijacking of the Emergency Alert Systems. The incident prompted a public response from the Randolph County Sheriff's Department clarifying that there was no actual emergency, and remained as a false alarm.
