= KEPI =

Radio station in Eagle Pass, Texas

- Eagle Pass, Texas; United States
- Broadcast area: Eagle Pass, Texas - Piedras Negras, Coahuila
- Frequency: 88.7 MHz

Programming
- Format: Spanish language Christian Radio

Ownership
- Owner: World Radio Network, Inc.
- Sister stations: KEPX

History
- Call sign meaning: Eagle Pass

Technical information
- Licensing authority: FCC
- Facility ID: 73756
- Class: A
- ERP: 1,000 watts
- HAAT: 55 meters (180 ft)
- Transmitter coordinates: 28°39′28″N 100°25′01″W

Links
- Public license information: Public file; LMS
- Webcast: Listen live
- Website: 887kepi.org

KEPI (88.7 FM) is a Spanish language Christian radio station licensed to Eagle Pass, Texas. The station is owned by World Radio Network, Inc.
