= KCLW =

Radio station in Hamilton, Texas

- Hamilton, Texas; United States
- Broadcast area: Killeen; Temple; Brownwood, Texas
- Frequency: 900 kHz

Programming
- Format: Classic country; contemporary Christian; southern gospel

Ownership
- Owner: Shane Carrington; (CTI Media Productions LLC)

History
- First air date: May 22, 1948
- Last air date: November 2024
- Former call signs: KOES (1989–1993)
- Call sign meaning: Clyde L. Weatherby

Technical information
- Licensing authority: FCC
- Facility ID: 10500
- Class: D
- Power: 250 watts day; 10 watts night
- Transmitter coordinates: 31°43′8″N 98°8′39″W

Links
- Public license information: Public file; LMS

KCLW (900 AM) was a radio station broadcasting a classic country music format. It was licensed to Hamilton, Texas, United States.

== History ==
Clyde L. Weatherby founded the radio station in 1948.

The station was assigned the call letters KOES on June 1, 1989. On August 9, 1993, the station changed its call sign to the current KCLW.

KCLW went silent in November 2024, after being damaged by lightning. The Federal Communications Commission cancelled the station's license on September 3, 2026, as it had been off the air for over a year.
