= KDTR =

Radio station in Florence–Missoula, Montana

- Florence, Montana; United States
- Broadcast area: Missoula, Montana
- Frequency: 103.3 (MHz)
- Branding: Trail 103.3

Programming
- Format: Adult Album Alternative

Ownership
- Owner: Missoula Broadcasting Company, LLC

History
- First air date: May 5, 2005
- Call sign meaning: Knowledgeable DJs Transmitting Rhythms

Technical information
- Licensing authority: FCC
- Class: C2
- ERP: 1,950 watts
- HAAT: 635 meters
- Transmitter coordinates: 46°48′6″N 113°58′22″W

Links
- Public license information: Public file; LMS
- Website: trail1033.com

KDTR (103.3 FM, "Trail 103.3") is a commercial radio station licensed to Florence, Montana, and serving the Missoula, Montana area, owned by Missoula Broadcasting Company, LLC. KDTR airs an Adult Album Alternative music format.

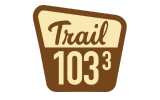

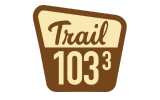
