= Midland City, Arizona =

- Populated place
- Location within the state of Arizona Midland City (the United States)
- Coordinates: 33°24′43″N 110°49′27″W
- Country: United States
- State: Arizona
- County: Gila
- Elevation: 3,353 ft (1,022 m)
- Time zone: UTC-7 (Mountain (MST))
  - Summer (DST): UTC-7 (MST)
- Area code: 928
- FIPS code: 04-46560
- GNIS feature ID: 31842

Midland City is a populated place situated in Gila County, Arizona, United States. It has an estimated elevation of 3,353 feet (1,022 m) above sea level.
