= KXIM =

- Sanborn, Iowa; United States
- Frequency: 98.3 MHz
- Branding: 98.3FM The Penguin

Programming
- Format: Variety

Ownership
- Owner: AM-770 Radio Engineering

Technical information
- Licensing authority: FCC
- Facility ID: 190429
- Class: A
- ERP: 100 watts
- HAAT: 51 metres (167 ft)
- Transmitter coordinates: 43°10′50″N 95°39′22″W

Links
- Public license information: Public file; LMS
- Webcast: Listen Live
- Website: Official Website

KXIM (98.3 FM) is a radio station licensed to serve the community of Sanborn, Iowa. The station is owned by AM-770 Radio Engineering, and airs a variety format.

The station was assigned the KXIM call letters by the Federal Communications Commission on August 14, 2012.
