= KMZZ =

Bishop, Texas; United States
- Broadcast area: Corpus Christi
- Frequency: 98.3 MHz
- Branding: La Ley 98.3

Programming
- Format: Regional Mexican

Ownership
- Owner: Claro Communications, Ltd.

History
- Former call signs: KFLZ (1980–2005)
- Former frequencies: 106.9 MHz (1980–2024)

Technical information
- Licensing authority: FCC
- Facility ID: 11228
- Class: C3
- ERP: 25,000 watts

Links
- Public license information: Public file; LMS
- Website: laleycc.com

KMZZ (98.3 FM, La Ley 98.3) is a radio station broadcasting a Regional Mexican music format. Licensed to Bishop, Texas, United States, the station serves the Corpus Christi area. The station is currently owned by Claro Communications, Ltd.

== History ==
The station was assigned the call sign KFLZ on June 20, 1980. On June 14, 2005, the station changed its call sign to the current KMZZ. Effective January 5, 2024, the station moved from its original 106.9 MHz frequency to 98.3 MHz.
