= CFPX-FM =

First Nations community radio station in Pukatagawan, Manitoba, Canada

Coordinates: 55.7425°N 101.322°W

- Pukatawagan, Manitoba; Canada
- Frequency: 98.3 MHz

Programming
- Format: community radio

Technical information
- Class: LP
- ERP: 35 watts
- HAAT: 41.3 meters (135 ft)

Links
- Website: Missinnippi River Native Communications

CFPX-FM is a First Nations community radio station that operates at 98.3 FM in Pukatawagan, Manitoba.

Owned by Missinnippi River Communications, the station was given approval by the CRTC on January 16, 1996.
