= CFWP-FM =

First Nations radio station in the Wahta Mohawk Territory, Canada

- Wahta Mohawk Territory, Ontario; Canada
- Frequency: 98.3 MHz
- Branding: Hawk Radio

Programming
- Format: First Nations community radio

Ownership
- Owner: Wahta Communications Society; (Matthew Commandant)

History
- First air date: November 17, 2002
- Last air date: August 15, 2008

CFWP-FM (Hawk Radio) was a First Nations community radio station broadcasting at 98.3 FM, in the Wahta Mohawk Territory, Ontario, Canada. The station began broadcasting in 2004 and was owned by the Wahta Mohawk First Nation through the Wahta Communications Society, under the licensee of Matthew Commandant, "on behalf of a non-profit organization to be incorporated".

The station had a signal covering much of the Wahta Reserve, but was somewhat weak in nearby Bala. Westwards towards Georgian Bay, it could be heard as far as Midland.

The station was on air from around November 17, 2002 until August 15, 2008. It has since been shut down by the current band council for political reasons. It is uncertain if the station will return to the air, as no renewal application had been filed with the CRTC, and the owner has not filed an application for a new license.
