= KEOK =

- Tahlequah, Oklahoma; United States
- Broadcast area: Tahlequah, Oklahoma
- Frequency: 102.1 MHz
- Branding: Lakes County 102.1

Programming
- Format: Country

Ownership
- Owner: Payne 5 Communications, LLC
- Sister stations: KTLQ, KITX, KTNT, KYOA, KSTQ, KTFX-FM, KDOE, KMMY, KZDV, KYHD, KNNU, KQIK-FM

History
- First air date: August 20, 1966 (at 101.7)
- Former call signs: KTLQ (1966-?)
- Former frequencies: 101.7 MHz (1966-?)

Technical information
- Licensing authority: FCC
- Facility ID: 16566
- Class: A
- ERP: 6,000 watts
- HAAT: 87 meters (285 ft)
- Transmitter coordinates: 35°53′42.67″N 94°57′12.16″W

Links
- Public license information: Public file; LMS
- Webcast: Listen Live
- Website: lakescountry1021.com

KEOK (102.1 FM, "Lakes Country 102.1") is a radio station licensed to serve the community of Tahlequah, OK United States. The station, established in 1973, is currently owned and operated by Payne 5 Communications, LLC.

KEOK broadcasts a country music format to the Tahlequah, Oklahoma area.
