= WKET =

- Kettering, Ohio; United States
- Broadcast area: Dayton
- Frequency: 98.3 MHz

Programming
- Format: Album Oriented Rock

Ownership
- Owner: Kettering City School District

History
- First air date: April 5, 1975

Technical information
- Licensing authority: FCC
- Facility ID: 34301
- Class: D
- ERP: 13 watts
- HAAT: 76 meters
- Transmitter coordinates: 39°41′46″N 84°09′43″W

Links
- Public license information: Public file; LMS

WKET (98.3 FM) is a radio station broadcasting an Album Oriented Rock format. Licensed to Kettering, Ohio, United States, it serves the Kettering area. The station is owned by Kettering City School District and is operated by the students at Kettering Fairmont High School. It was launched in May 1975 by Fairmont West students Matthew Smith and Chuck Hamlin.
