= KDZY =

- McCall, Idaho; United States
- Frequency: 98.3 MHz
- Branding: Heartland Country 98.3

Programming
- Format: Country

Ownership
- Owner: Inspirational Family Radio, Inc.

Technical information
- Licensing authority: FCC
- Facility ID: 82884
- Class: C3
- ERP: 500 watts
- HAAT: 586 meters
- Transmitter coordinates: 45°0′18″N 116°8′1″W

Links
- Public license information: Public file; LMS

KDZY (98.3 FM) is a radio station broadcasting a country format. Licensed to McCall, Idaho, United States, the station is currently owned by Inspirational Family Radio.
