= KYAR =

Radio station in Lorena, Texas

- Lorena, Texas; United States
- Broadcast area: Waco, Texas
- Frequency: 98.3 MHz
- Branding: RED-C Catholic Radio

Programming
- Format: Catholic
- Affiliations: EWTN, Relevant Radio

Ownership
- Owner: Red-C Apostolate

History
- First air date: April 10, 1976
- Former call signs: KMCS (1976–1982); KPEP (1982–1988); KHQS (1988–1989); KRYL (1989–1999); KASZ (1999–2003); KVLZ (2003–2006)

Technical information
- Licensing authority: FCC
- Facility ID: 77840
- Class: A
- ERP: 4,100 watts
- HAAT: 121 meters (397 ft)
- Transmitter coordinates: 31°24′45″N 97°12′40″W

Links
- Public license information: Public file; LMS
- Webcast: Listen Live
- Website: https://www.redcradio.org/

KYAR (98.3 FM) is a radio station licensed to Lorena, Texas. The station airs a Catholic format and is owned by Red-C Apostolate.

== History ==
The station began broadcasting on April 10, 1976, as KMCS in Gatesville. It originally aired country and easy listening music and was owned by George W. McClarin alongside KCLW (900 AM). After a 1978 sale attempt to Lowell Duncan was not consummated, McClarin found his buyer in Monarch Communications Systems, which purchased the station for $115,000, plus $10,000 for a non-compete agreement.

By 1981, Monarch was more than $100,000 in debt to McClarin for the purchase of the station, prompting McClarin to seek a default judgment against Monarch in Hamilton County court. The station went off air February 2, 1982, six days before its assets were confiscated. Monarch had filed to change the call letters to KPEP during this time. A receiver was appointed; in September, broadcasting resumed. KPEP aired the same country format as KMCS-FM had. In 1983, the station was sold to C.D.L.R. Communications for $150,000.

On August 22, 1988, its call sign was changed to KHQS. KHQS aired a Christian contemporary format.

In 1989, the station was sold to Gaylon W. Christie for $50,000, and on July 13, 1989, its call sign was changed to KRYL. The station returned to airing a country format. In 1991, it was sold to LDR Broadcasting for $125,000. KRYL adopted a classic rock format in 1998. In 1999, the station was sold to Capstar, and on September 17, 1999, its call sign was changed to KASZ. The station continued to air a classic rock format.

In 2003, the station was sold to Educational Media Foundation for $100,000, and on March 21, 2003 its call sign was changed to KVLZ. It adopted a Christian contemporary format, as an affiliate of K-Love. On February 15, 2006, the station's call sign was changed to KYAR, and it became an affiliate of Air1. In 2010, the station's city of license was changed to Lorena, Texas and its transmitter was moved to a location between Lorena and Hewitt, Texas.

In 2016, KYAR was sold to Red-C Apostolate for $495,000, and it adopted a Catholic format.

== Simulcast ==
RED-C Catholic Radio is also heard on 88.5 KEDC in Hearne, Texas and 107.9 KINF-LP in Palestine, Texas.

Call sign	Frequency	City of license	FID	ERP (W)	HAAT	Class	FCC info
KEDC	88.5 FM	Hearne, Texas	172341	2,500	56 m (184 ft)	A	LMS
KINF-LP	107.9 FM	Palestine, Texas	193128	55	41 m (135 ft)	L1	LMS
