= KERM =

- Torrington, Wyoming; United States
- Frequency: 98.3 MHz

Programming
- Format: Country music
- Affiliations: ABC Radio

Ownership
- Owner: Kath Broadcasting Co.
- Sister stations: KGOS

Technical information
- Licensing authority: FCC
- Facility ID: 46739
- Class: A
- ERP: 3,000 watts
- HAAT: 91.0 meters (298.6 ft)
- Transmitter coordinates: 41°59′41″N 104°12′5″W

Links
- Public license information: Public file; LMS
- Website: kgoskerm.com

KERM (98.3 FM) is a radio station broadcasting a country music format. It is licensed to Torrington, Wyoming, United States. The station is currently owned by Kath Broadcasting, and features programming from ABC Radio.

== History ==
The station went on the air as KERM.
