= KDMM =

- Parker Strip, Arizona; United States
- Frequency: 103.1 MHz
- Branding: KDMM 103.1 FM

Programming
- Format: Top 40

Ownership
- Owner: Sanford Cohen; (River Rat Radio, LLC)
- Sister stations: KPKR, KXBB

Technical information
- Licensing authority: FCC
- Facility ID: 198737
- Class: B1
- ERP: 2,800 watts
- HAAT: 200 meters (660 ft)
- Transmitter coordinates: 34°18′39″N 114°10′11″W

Links
- Public license information: Public file; LMS
- Webcast: Listen Live
- Website: Official Website

KDMM (103.1 FM) is a radio station licensed to serve the community of Parker Strip, Arizona. Its coverage area includes the communities of Parker, Lake Havasu City and Parker Dam. The station is owned by Sanford and Terry Cohen, through licensee River Rat Radio, LLC, and airs a Hot Hits format. The station is known locally as K-DAM and streams worldwide on its website www.bestdamradio.com and on the River Rat Radio app.

KDMM is a member of the Parker, Lake Havasu City and Needles, CA Chambers of Commerce and supports the Lake Havasu Marine Association and Lake Havasu Hospitality Association.

The station was assigned the KDMM call letters by the Federal Communications Commission on March 1, 2016.
