= WGWD-LP =

- Paintsville, Kentucky; United States
- Frequency: 98.3 MHz

Programming
- Format: Christian

Ownership
- Owner: (Paintsville Church of Christ)

History
- Call sign meaning: Walking God's Way Daily

Technical information
- Licensing authority: FCC
- Facility ID: 195095
- Class: L1
- ERP: 3 watts
- Transmitter coordinates: 37.7956°N 82.8008°W

Links
- Public license information: LMS
- Webcast: Listen Live
- Website: paintsvillechurchofchrist.com

WGWD-LP (98.3 FM) is an American non-commercial religious radio station licensed by the Federal Communications Commission to serve the community of Paintsville, Kentucky. The station license is assigned to Paintsville Church of Christ. WGWD-LP airs a Christian radio format.

The station has held the WGWD-LP callsign since October 14, 2014.
