= KDDL =

- Chino Valley, Arizona; United States
- Broadcast area: Prescott–Prescott Valley–Chino Valley, Arizona
- Frequency: 94.3 MHz
- Branding: Cattle Country 94.3

Programming
- Format: Classic Country
- Affiliations: Arizona Cardinals Football

Ownership
- Owner: Arizona's Hometown Radio Group; (Prescott Valley Broadcasting Co. Inc.)
- Sister stations: KPKR, KPPV, KQNA

History
- First air date: 1984
- Former call signs: KAKP-FM, KPBZ, KFPB
- Call sign meaning: Cattle

Technical information
- Licensing authority: FCC
- Facility ID: 109
- Class: C3
- ERP: 4,100 watts
- HAAT: 247 meters (810 feet)
- Transmitter coordinates: 34°49′32″N 112°34′09″W
- Translator: (100.7 MHz) K264DE (Rancho Vista)

Links
- Public license information: Public file; LMS
- Webcast: Listen Live
- Website: CattleCountryRadio.com

KDDL (94.3 FM, "Cattle Country 94.3") is an American radio station licensed to serve Chino Valley, Arizona. Its coverage area includes Prescott, Prescott Valley and Chino Valley. The station was acquired in 2007 by Sanford and Terry Cohen d/b/a Arizona's Hometown Radio Group and licensed to Prescott Valley Broadcasting Co. Inc. It airs a classic country music format. Cattle Country is also heard via FM translator at 100.7 FM. KDDL is a radio sponsor of Prescott Frontier Days, home of the World's Oldest Rodeo. It broadcasts live every rodeo season from the Prescott Frontier Days Parade and also from the Chino Valley Territorial Days Parade every September.

KDDL is a member of the Prescott, Prescott Valley, Chino Valley and Cottonwood-Verde Valley Chambers of Commerce as well as a member of the Prescott Downtown Partnership

The station was assigned the "KDDL" call sign by the Federal Communications Commission on October 15, 2007.
