= WRLR-LP =

Radio station in Round Lake Heights, Illinois

Coordinates: 42.3864°N 88.0976°W

- Round Lake Beach, Illinois; United States
- Frequency: 98.3 MHz
- Branding: 98.3 Life FM

Ownership
- Owner: Rondaradio

History
- Call sign meaning: Round Lake Radio

Technical information
- Licensing authority: FCC
- Class: L1
- ERP: 100 watts
- HAAT: 74 meters (243 ft)

Links
- Public license information: LMS
- Website: 983thelife.com

WRLR-LP (98.3 FM) is a low-power radio station based in Round Lake Beach, Illinois.

In 2008, the TechTalk Show was selected as one of Information Week's 100 Top Tech Finds. In 2010, Paste Magazine named WRLR-LP one of the 40 best little radio stations in the United States. In 2011, the Houston Press also named Subterranean, WRLR-LP's Thursday night underground rock show, "the best place to hear up and coming indie-rock in the entire world."

WRLR-LP was also featured on Harry Porterfield's "Someone You Should Know" on WLS-TV, ABC's Chicago local station, broadcast March 9, 2009.

Former logo
