= KDAR =

Christian radio station in Oxnard, California, United States

- Oxnard, California; United States
- Broadcast area: Oxnard; Ventura; Santa Barbara
- Frequency: 98.3 MHz
- Branding: 98.3 KDAR

Programming
- Format: Christian radio
- Network: SRN News

Ownership
- Owner: Salem Media Group; (New Inspiration Broadcasting Company, Inc.)

History
- First air date: October 28, 1974

Technical information
- Licensing authority: FCC
- Facility ID: 3077
- Class: B1
- ERP: 1,500 watts
- HAAT: 393 meters (1,289 ft)
- Transmitter coordinates: 34°20′55.00″N 119°20′0.4″W
- Repeater: 98.3 KDAR-1 (Santa Barbara)

Links
- Public license information: Public file; LMS
- Webcast: Listen live
- Website: kdar.com

KDAR (98.3 FM, "The Word") is a commercial radio station licensed to Oxnard, California, and serving the Oxnard-Ventura and Santa Barbara radio markets. It is owned by the Salem Media Group and it broadcasts a Christian radio format.

KDAR has an effective radiated power (ERP) of 1,500 watts. The transmitter is on Red Mountain Fire Road in Ventura. Programming is also heard on 3,700-watt FM booster station KDAR-1 (98.3) in Santa Barbara, located atop Gibraltar Peak just outside the city.

== History ==
KDAR first signed on the air on October 28, 1974. Religious broadcaster Edward G. Atsinger III, was the station's original owner, president, and general manager. In 1986, Atsinger transferred control of the station's license to Salem Communications Corporation, an entity of which he owned half at the time.

In its early years, KDAR aired several hours of Contemporary Christian music each day in addition to Christian talk shows. Since the early 1990s, however, the station has reduced its music programming. It now runs talk and teaching programs around the clock.
