= KFCM =

- Cherokee Village, Arkansas; United States
- Frequency: 98.3 MHz
- Branding: The River 98.3

Programming
- Format: Classic hits
- Affiliations: CBS News Radio

Ownership
- Owner: KFCM, Inc.

History
- First air date: 1981

Technical information
- Licensing authority: FCC
- Facility ID: 34416
- Class: C3
- ERP: 25,000 watts
- HAAT: 97 meters
- Transmitter coordinates: 36°21′58″N 91°28′35″W

Links
- Public license information: Public file; LMS
- Webcast: Listen Live
- Website: www.myhometownradiostations.com/kfcm__the_river__98_3_fm

KFCM (98.3 FM) is a radio station broadcasting an oldies-leaning classic hits format. Licensed to Cherokee Village, Arkansas, United States. The station is currently owned by KFCM, Inc.
