= KEDI (FM) =

- Bethel, Alaska; United States
- Broadcast area: Metro Bethel
- Frequency: 98.3 MHz
- Branding: KEDI 98.3

Programming
- Format: Full-service

Ownership
- Owner: Strait Media, LLC
- Sister stations: KRUP

History
- First air date: 2015
- Call sign meaning: Chief Eddie Hoffman

Technical information
- Licensing authority: FCC
- Facility ID: 189526
- Class: A
- ERP: 210 watts
- HAAT: 41 meters (135 ft)
- Transmitter coordinates: 60°46′58.30″N 161°50′26.10″W

Links
- Public license information: Public file; LMS

KEDI is a full-service formatted broadcast radio station licensed to and serving Bethel, Alaska. KEDI is owned and operated by Strait Media, LLC.
