= KPKR =

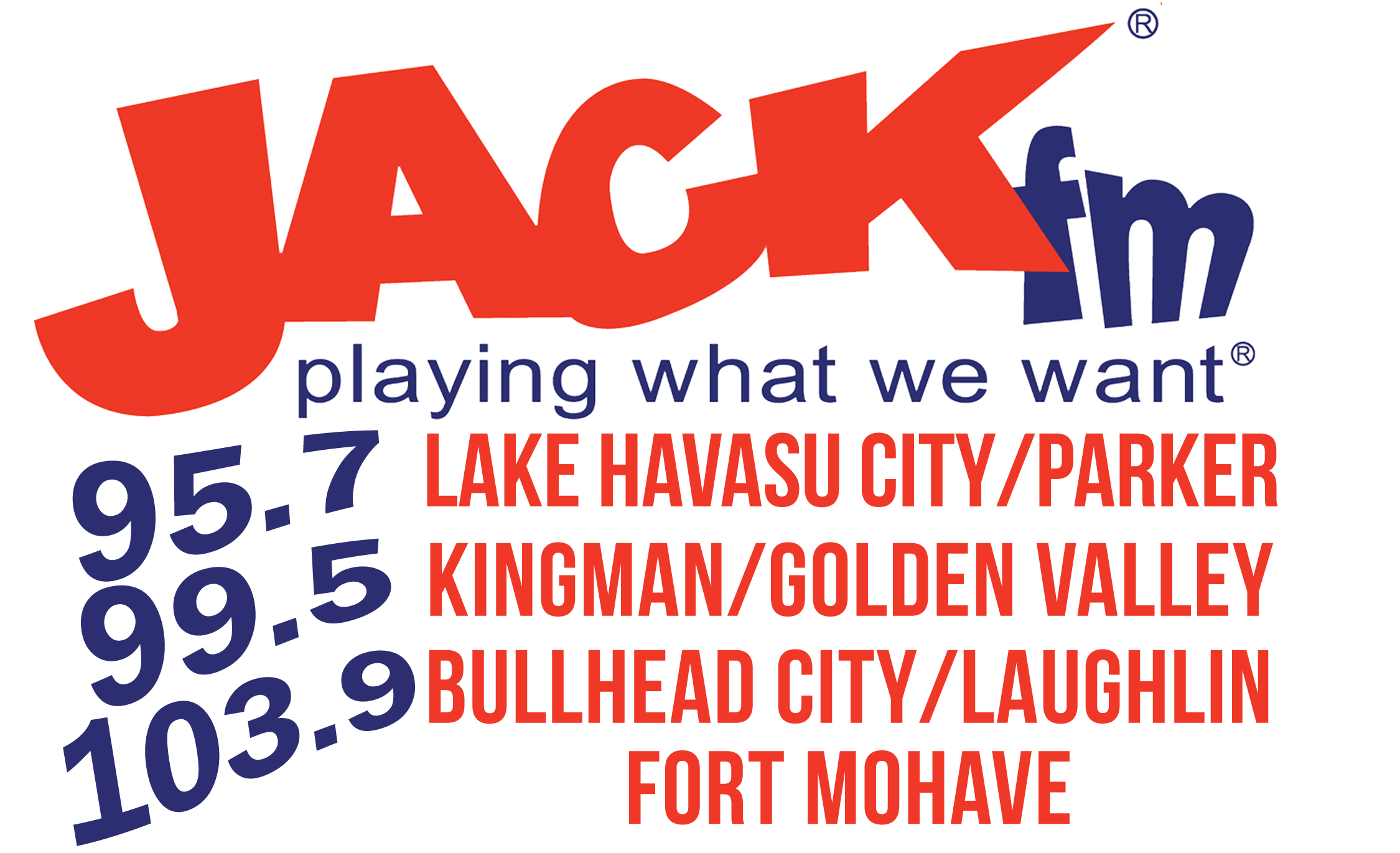
- Parker, Arizona; United States
- Broadcast area: Lake Havasu City, Arizona
- Frequency: 95.7 MHz
- Branding: 95.7 Jack FM

Programming
- Format: Variety hits
- Affiliations: Jack FM network

Ownership
- Owner: Arizona's Hometown Radio Group; (River Rat Radio, LLC)
- Sister stations: KDMM, KXBB

History
- First air date: February 1, 2008 (at 97.3)
- Former frequencies: 97.3 MHz (2007–2010)
- Call sign meaning: K ParKeR

Technical information
- Licensing authority: FCC
- Facility ID: 170952
- Class: C3
- ERP: 6,300 watts
- HAAT: 200 meters (660 feet)
- Transmitter coordinates: 34°18′39″N 114°10′11″W
- Translators: K258DW (99.5 MHz, Kingman)
- Repeaters: KIDD (103.9 MHz, Fort Mohave)

Links
- Public license information: Public file; LMS
- Webcast: Listen live
- Website: riverratradio.com

KPKR (95.7 FM, "95.7 Jack FM") is an American radio station licensed to serve the community of Parker, Arizona. The station, established in 2008, is currently owned by River Rat Radio, LLC. It broadcasts a variety hits music format to the greater Lake Havasu City, Arizona, area.

== History ==
In April 2007, Prescott Valley Broadcasting Company, Inc., applied to the Federal Communications Commission (FCC) for a construction permit for a new Class C3 broadcast radio station on 97.3 MHz to serve Parker, Arizona. The FCC granted this permit on July 3, 2007, with a scheduled expiration date of July 3, 2010. The new station was assigned call sign "KPKR" on July 23, 2007. After construction and testing were completed, the station began broadcasting under program test authority on February 1, 2008. KPKR was granted its broadcast license on April 24, 2008.

In August 2008, the station applied to the FCC to change broadcast frequencies from 97.3 MHz to 95.7 MHz. The FCC granted a construction permit for this change on August 16, 2010, with a scheduled August 16, 2013, expiration.

Former branding

In February 2009, the station's owners filed an application with the FCC to transfer the broadcast license for KPKR from Prescott Valley Broadcasting Company, jointly owned by Sanford B. Cohen and Sandy Cohen, to a new company called River Rat Radio, LLC, which is controlled by the Sanford B. Cohen Family Trust. The FCC approved the transfer on March 9, 2009, and the move was formally consummated on May 1, 2009.

KPKR applied for a new broadcast license to cover the changes made under the construction permit in September 2010. In October 2010, the station applied for a second construction permit, this one permitting a move from Class C3 to Class B1 made possible by the new frequency and transmitter location. This second permit was granted on April 21, 2011, with a scheduled expiration date of April 21, 2014. The FCC granted the new license for changes under the first permit and KPKR began licensed operation on 95.7 MHz on November 15, 2010. On the same date, the station began operating under program test authority at a higher effective radiated power.

On July 19, 2022, KPKR added a simulcast to KIDD 103.9 in Fort Mohave, Arizona.
