= KEJJ =

- Gunnison, Colorado; United States
- Frequency: 98.3 MHz
- Branding: The Edge

Programming
- Format: Classic hits

Ownership
- Owner: John Harvey Rees; (Gunnison Radio)

History
- First air date: 1981 (as KGUC-FM)
- Former call signs: KGUC-FM (1981–1992); KKYY (1992–1998)

Technical information
- Licensing authority: FCC
- Facility ID: 57338
- Class: A
- ERP: 3,000 watts
- HAAT: 91 meters
- Transmitter coordinates: 38°31′22″N 106°54′28″W

Links
- Public license information: Public file; LMS
- Website: kejj983.com

KEJJ (98.3 FM) is a radio station broadcasting a classic hits format. Licensed to Gunnison, Colorado, United States, the station is currently owned by John Harvey Rees. The station is the primary broadcaster in the valley for the Gunnison High School and Western Colorado University athletic events.

== History ==
The station was assigned the call letters KGUC-FM on February 18, 1981, with an Easy Listening format mixed in with oldies and adult standards. On May 22, 1992, the station changed its call sign to KKYY, and on January 16, 1998, to the current KEJJ.
