= 100.1 FM =

FM radio frequency

The following radio stations broadcast on FM frequency 100.1 MHz:

== Argentina ==
- Radio Continental Rosario in Rosario, Santa Fe
- Radio María in General Alvear, Mendoza
- Radio Panorama in Santiago del Estero

== Australia ==
- 3SPH in Shepparton, Victoria
- 5GTR in Mount Gambier, South Australia
- 4QBB in Bundaberg, Queensland
- 6NR in Perth, Western Australia
- 8HOT in Darwin, Northern Territory
- Life FM (Bathurst) in Bathurst, New South Wales
- 2HHH in Sydney, New South Wales
- Triple J in Bega, New South Wales

== Belize ==
- Hamaalali Radio at Dangriga, Stann Creek District

== China ==
- MIX100 FM in Pudong, Shanghai

== Canada (Channel 261) ==
- CBF-FM-7 in Radisson, Quebec
- CBKG-FM in Fond-du-Lac, Saskatchewan
- CBRL-FM in Lethbridge, Alberta
- CBSI-FM-17 in La Tabatiere, Quebec
- CBYW-FM in Whistler, British Columbia
- CFDE-FM in Keyano, Quebec
- CFGQ-FM-2 in Banff, Alberta
- CHCQ-FM in Belleville, Ontario
- CHFN-FM in Neyaashiinigmiing, Ontario
- CHLP-FM in Listowel, Ontario
- CHOX-FM-3 in Saint-Aubert, Quebec
- CIAM-FM-10 in Buckland, Saskatchewan
- CIOO-FM in Halifax, Nova Scotia
- CJCD-FM in Yellowknife, Northwest Territories
- CJCD-FM-1 in Hay River, Northwest Territories
- CJEB-FM in Trois-Rivieres, Quebec
- CJGR-FM in Gold River, British Columbia
- CJNK-FM in Algonquin Park, Ontario
- CJVD-FM in Vaudreuil, Quebec
- CKAG-FM in Pikogan, Quebec
- CKBZ-FM in Kamloops, British Columbia
- CKFU-FM in Fort St. John, British Columbia
- CKVB-FM in Corner Brook, Newfoundland and Labrador
- CKVL-FM in Lasalle, Quebec
- VF2002 in Donald Station, British Columbia
- VF2041 in Pelly Crossing, Yukon
- VF2223 in Dease Lake, British Columbia

== Hungary ==
=== Magyarország ===
- Győr + Rádió in Győr

== Malaysia ==
- My in Langkawi
- TraXX FM in Selangor & Western Pahang South Perak Seremban, Port Dickson, Jelebu, Negeri Sembilan
- Lite in Kuching, Sarawak

== Mexico ==
- XHARZ-FM in Aguascalientes, Aguascalientes
- XHCBR-FM in Caborca, Sonora
- XHCNA-FM in Culiacán, Sinaloa
- XHCSAE-FM in Ciudad Obregon, Sonora
- XHHPC-FM in Hidalgo del Parral, Chihuahua
- XHJT-FM in Tampico, Tamaulipas
- XHMBR-FM in Boca del Río, Veracruz
- XHMM-FM in Mexico City
- XHNE-FM in Coatzacoalcos, Veracruz
- XHOQ-FM in Oaxaca, Oaxaca
- XHPEFB-FM in Los Ramones, Nuevo León
- XHPHUA-FM in Huajuapan de León, Oaxaca
- XHPM-FM in San Luis Potosí, San Luis Potosí
- XHRCH-FM in Ojinaga, Chihuahua
- XHSE-FM in Acapulco, Guerrero
- XHTIX-FM in Temixco, Morelos
- XHUD-FM in Tuxtla Gutiérrez, Chiapas
- XHXK-FM in Poza Rica, Veracruz
- XHYU-FM in Mérida, Yucatán

== Paraguay ==
- ZPV100 at Asunción

== Philippines ==
- DYSM-FM in Kalibo, Aklan
- DXDB-FM in Iligan City
- DXME in Koronadal City

== Taiwan ==
- International Community Radio Taipei in Central Taiwan (Not included Chiayi, Chiayi County, Yunlin)

== Ukraine ==
- Radio One in Mykolaiv
- Kiss FM in Feodosiya

== United Kingdom ==
- Smooth Lake District in Kendal and Morecambe

== United States (Channel 261) ==
- KATQ-FM in Plentywood, Montana
- KBBM in Jefferson City, Missouri
- KCHQ in Soda Springs, Idaho
- KCLL in San Angelo, Texas
- KCMG-LP in Lovington, New Mexico
- KCTN in Garnavillo, Iowa
- KDJR in De Soto, Missouri
- KGBA-FM in Holtville, California
- KGMN in Kingman, Arizona
- KHSJ-LP in Las Vegas, Nevada
- KHWG-FM in Crystal, Nevada
- KHZZ-LP in Hays, Kansas
- KJBI in Fort Pierre, South Dakota
- KJDE in Carbon, Texas
- KJHR-LP in Teton Village, Wyoming
- KKLJ in Julian, California
- KKSC-LP in Silver City, New Mexico
- KKTY-FM in Glendo, Wyoming
- KKWK in Cameron, Missouri
- KKZQ in Tehachapi, California
- KMEH-LP in Helena, Montana
- KMMR in Malta, Montana
- KMXT (FM) in Kodiak, Alaska
- KNRB in Atlanta, Texas
- KOLV in Olivia, Minnesota
- KOMC-FM in Kimberling City, Missouri
- KONN-LP in Kansas City, Missouri
- KPKA-LP in Beatrice, Nebraska
- KQBQ in Meyersville, Texas
- KQFO in Pasco, Washington
- KQOD in Stockton, California
- KRAQ-LP in Rancho Mirage, California
- KRFD in Fleming, Colorado
- KRVV in Bastrop, Louisiana
- KSDH-LP in Great Bend, Kansas
- KUYY in Emmetsburg, Iowa
- KVNA-FM in Flagstaff, Arizona
- KWFX in Woodward, Oklahoma
- KWHQ-FM in Kenai, Alaska
- KWSA in Price, Utah
- KXRB-FM in Brandon, South Dakota
- KXZZ in Dayton, Nevada
- KYBI in Lufkin, Texas
- KYFM in Bartlesville, Oklahoma
- KYKC in Byng, Oklahoma
- KYKD in Bethel, Alaska
- KZBA-LP in Bazine, Kansas
- KZOQ-FM in Missoula, Montana
- KZQA-LP in Amarillo, Texas
- KZRO in Dunsmuir, California
- KZST in Santa Rosa, California
- WALY in Altoona, Pennsylvania
- WASL (FM) in Dyersburg, Tennessee
- WBCH-FM in Hastings, Michigan
- WBCM-LP in Bristol, Virginia
- WBPV-LP in Bradenton, Florida
- WBRR in Bradford, Pennsylvania
- WBRS in Waltham, Massachusetts
- WBXB in Edenton, North Carolina
- WCLG-FM in Morgantown, West Virginia
- WDDC in Portage, Wisconsin
- WDMX in Vienna, West Virginia
- WDST in Woodstock, New York
- WDXX in Selma, Alabama
- WFBM-LP in Beaver Springs, Pennsylvania
- WFCV-FM in Bluffton, Indiana
- WFLQ in French Lick, Indiana
- WFRI in Winamac, Indiana
- WFVY in Lebanon, Pennsylvania
- WGGF-LP in Sun City Center, Florida
- WGLC-FM in Mendota, Illinois
- WGSY in Phenix City, Alabama
- WHFF-LP in Hammond, Louisiana
- WHHC-LP in New Castle, Indiana
- WHOU-FM in Houlton, Maine
- WILA in Live Oak, Florida
- WIWT-LP in Jackson, Mississippi
- WJBD-FM in Salem, Illinois
- WJPP-LP in Palm City, Florida
- WJRZ-FM in Manahawkin, New Jersey
- WKAI in Macomb, Illinois
- WKQQ in Winchester, Kentucky
- WKQY in Tazewell, Virginia
- WLAY-FM in Littleville, Alabama
- WLCW in West Salem, Wisconsin
- WMAN-FM in Shelby, Ohio
- WMDJ-FM in Allen, Kentucky
- WNIR (FM) in Kent, Ohio
- WNSY in Talking Rock, Georgia
- WPNH-FM in Plymouth, New Hampshire
- WPTP-LP in Chattanooga, Tennessee
- WPUP in Washington, Georgia
- WQFN in Forest City, Pennsylvania
- WQMJ in Forsyth, Georgia
- WQPD in Lake City, South Carolina
- WQXB in Grenada, Mississippi
- WRHN in Rhinelander, Wisconsin
- WRHP in Anniston, Alabama
- WRLT in Franklin, Tennessee
- WRPK-LP in Kilmarnock, Virginia
- WSHT-LP in Indianapolis, Indiana
- WSJP-FM in Port Washington, Wisconsin
- WUBP-LP in St. Petersburg, Florida
- WUPE-FM in North Adams, Massachusetts
- WVBE-FM in Lynchburg, Virginia
- WVBI-LP in Beaver Island, Michigan
- WVIB in Holton, Michigan
- WVMD in Romney, West Virginia
- WVVF-LP in Town N' Country, Florida
- WWFX in Southbridge, Massachusetts
- WWLY in Panama City Beach, Florida
- WXBT in West Columbia, South Carolina
- WXMM-LP in Galax, Virginia
- WXTJ-LP in Charlottesville, Virginia
- WXWS-LP in Bone Gap, Illinois
- WXYY in Rincon, Georgia
- WXZQ in Piketon, Ohio
- WZFJ in Pequot Lakes, Minnesota
- WZJZ in Port Charlotte, Florida
