= 89.5 FM =

FM radio frequency

The following radio stations broadcast on FM frequency 89.5 MHz:

== Argentina ==
- Amistad in La Verde, Chaco
- Ciudad in Coronel Pringles, Buenos Aires
- Ciudad in Lobería, Buenos Aires
- Cristal in Ingeniero Luiggi, La Pampa
- CNN Radio Rosario in Rosario, Santa Fe
- Ideas del Pueblo in Colonia Aldao, Santa Fe
- Municipal in General Rodriguez, Buenos Aires
- Nuevo horizonte in San Carlos, Corrientes
- Radio María in Ciudadela, Buenos Aires
- Radio María in Mayor Buratovich, Buenos Aires
- Radio María in General Cabrera, Córdoba
- Radio María in Pilar, Córdoba
- Radio María in Chamical, La Rioja
- Radio María in Cutral Có, Neuquén
- Radio María in El Bolsón, Río Negro
- Radio María in Río Colorado, Río Negro
- Radio María in Rosario de Lerma, Salta
- Rec in Moreno, Buenos Aires
- Reconquista in Jose Leon Suarez, Buenos Aires
- San Ramon in Goya, Corrientes
- Sol in Parana, Entre Rios
- Universo in Comodoro Rivadavia, Chubut
- Uno in Paso de los Libres, Corrientes
- Urbana in Buenos Aires
- Visión Formosa in Formosa

== Australia ==
- Valley FM 89.5 Tuggeranong in Tuggeranong, Australian Capital Territory
- ABC Classic in Goulburn, New South Wales
- 2GF 89.5 in Grafton, New South Wales
- Triple J in Sunshine Coast, Queensland
- 3PNN in Bendigo, Victoria
- SBS Radio in Wodonga, Victoria

== Canada (Channel 208) ==
- CBHN-FM in New Glasgow, Nova Scotia
- CBPJ-FM in Waterton Park, Alberta
- CBSM-FM in Sault Ste. Marie, Ontario
- CBUD-FM in Bonnington Falls, British Columbia
- CBYP-FM in Portland Creek, Newfoundland and Labrador
- CFGB-FM in Goose Bay, Newfoundland and Labrador
- CHWK-FM in Chilliwack, British Columbia
- CIUT-FM in Toronto, Ontario
- CJBR-FM-1 in Riviere-du-Loup, Quebec
- CJRL-FM in Kenora, Ontario
- CJSE-FM in Shediac, New Brunswick
- CKWG-FM in Wahgoshig Lake, Ontario

== China ==
- CNR Business Radio in Yongzhou
- CNR Kazakh Radio in Xinjiang
- CNR The Voice of China in Putian
- Yangjiang Travel & Economic Radio
- GRT News Radio in Jieyang

== Costa Rica ==
- LIFE 895 FM in Curridabat, San José

== Hungary ==
- Rádió 1 in Budapest

== Israel ==
- Radio Jerusalem in Jerusalem

== Malaysia ==
- IKIMfm in Malacca
- Kool FM in Kota Kinabalu, Sabah (coming soon)

== Mexico ==
- XHBON-FM in Guadalajara, Jalisco
- XHCG-FM in Nogales, Sonora
- XHCSI-FM in Culiacán, Sinaloa
- XHFTI-FM in Fortín, Veracruz
- XHME-FM in Puerto Vallarta, Jalisco
- XHNAL-FM in Tonalá, Chiapas
- XHRCL-FM in San Luis Río Colorado, Sonora
- XHRRR-FM in Encarnación de Díaz, Jalisco
- XHRV-FM in Valle Hermoso, Tamaulipas
- XHSAB-FM in Sabinas Hidalgo, Nuevo León
- XHUAQ-FM in Querétaro, Querétaro
- XHUCT-FM in Torreón, Coahuila

== Philippines ==
- DWIM-FM in Baguio
- DWJX in Sorsogon
- DWSB-FM in Subic Bay Freeport Zone, Olongapo
- DZTR in Naga, Camarines Sur
- DYQN in Iloilo City
- DYKZ in Dumaguete City
- DXYM in General Santos
- DWEG in Lipa
- FM Radio Davnor in Tagum

== Taiwan ==
- Transfers CNR The Voice of China in Central Taiwan, mainly Wuqiu Township of Kinmen County

== Thailand ==
- Live 89.5 Radio

== United States (Channel 208) ==
- KACU in Abilene, Texas
- KAGJ in Ephraim, Utah
- KAIB in Shafter, California
- KBAQ in Phoenix, Arizona
- KBES in Ceres, California
- KBMJ in Heber Springs, Arkansas
- KBMM in Odessa, Texas
- KBPG (FM) in Montevideo, Minnesota
- KCAC (FM) in Camden, Arkansas
- KCFV in Ferguson, Missouri
- KCJA in Conway, Iowa
- KCKJ in Sarcoxie, Missouri
- KCNP in Ada, Oklahoma
- KDCB in Coos Bay, Oregon
- KDKO in Lake Andes, South Dakota
- KEFS in North Powder, Oregon
- KENW in Portales, New Mexico
- KEPX in Eagle Pass, Texas
- KEQX in Stephenville, Texas
- KEWU in Cheney, Washington
- KFAA in Horace, North Dakota
- KGRU in Burwell, Nebraska
- KGVI-FM in Grangeville, Idaho
- KGWO in Ogallala, Nebraska
- KHCD in Salina, Kansas
- KHKE in Cedar Falls, Iowa
- KICO in Rico, Colorado
- KITA in Iota, Louisiana
- KJAI in Ojai, California
- KJCC in Carnegie, Oklahoma
- KJVH in Longview, Washington
- KJZA in Drake, Arizona
- KKLY in El Paso, Texas
- KLAP in Gerlach, Nevada
- KLCD in Decorah, Iowa
- KLFG in Fort Dodge, Iowa
- KLND in Little Eagle, South Dakota
- KLRI in Rigby, Idaho
- KLUX in Robstown, Texas
- KLXD in Victorville, California
- KMFA in Austin, Texas
- KMGS in Anvik, Alaska
- KMOC in Wichita Falls, Texas
- KNCJ in Reno, Nevada
- KNHC in Seattle, Washington
- KNIB in Nikolai, Alaska
- KNLH in Cedar Hill, Missouri
- KOKS in Poplar Bluff, Missouri
- KOPN in Columbia, Missouri
- KPBS in San Diego, California
- KPFR in Pine Grove, Oregon
- KPJH in Polson, Montana
- KPOO in San Francisco, California
- KPPR in Williston, North Dakota
- KPRA in Ukiah, California
- KPRN in Grand Junction, Colorado
- KQAL in Winona, Minnesota
- KQSI-LP in Sidney, Nebraska
- KRCI in Pinetop-Lakeside, Arizona
- KSKC in Crooked Creek, Alaska
- KSKO-FM in McGrath, Alaska
- KSKP in Sleetmute, Alaska
- KSKQ in Ashland, Oregon
- KSMC in Moraga, California
- KSOH in Wapato, Washington
- KTCB in Tillamook, Oregon
- KTCF in Dolores, Colorado
- KTEC in Klamath Falls, Oregon
- KTKF in Tok, Alaska
- KTME in Reliance, Wyoming
- KTOT in Spearman, Texas
- KTSC in Pueblo, Colorado
- KTSY in Caldwell, Idaho
- KUSR in Logan, Utah
- KVBE-LP in Portland, Oregon
- KVLK in Milan, New Mexico
- KVMR in Nevada City, California
- KVNE in Tyler, Texas
- KVRF in Sutton, Alaska
- KVSJ-FM in Tracy, California
- KVUD in Bay City, Texas
- KWCC-FM in Woodland Park, Colorado
- KWGS in Tulsa, Oklahoma
- KYFL in Monroe, Louisiana
- KYHK in Kearney, Nebraska
- KYPF in Stanford, Montana
- KYQX in Weatherford, Texas
- KZCT in Vallejo, California
- WAHS in Auburn Heights, Michigan
- WAWN in Franklin, Pennsylvania
- WAYJ in Naples, Florida
- WBCY in Archbold, Ohio
- WBEW in Chesterton, Indiana
- WBFR in Birmingham, Alabama
- WBSB (FM) in Anderson, Indiana
- WCLQ in Wausau, Wisconsin
- WCMU in Mount Pleasant, Michigan
- WCNP in Baraboo, Wisconsin
- WCOF in Arcade, New York
- WCVV in Belpre, Ohio
- WDPS in Dayton, Ohio
- WDTP in Huron Township, Michigan
- WEFI in Effingham, Illinois
- WEOS in Geneva, New York
- WETS in Johnson City, Tennessee
- WFIT in Melbourne, Florida
- WFOT in Lexington, Ohio
- WGRN in Greenville, Illinois
- WGSG in Mayo, Florida
- WGTF in Dothan, Alabama
- WHRV in Norfolk, Virginia
- WHSS in Hamilton, Ohio
- WHVY in Coshocton, Ohio
- WILB-FM in Boardman, Ohio
- WITF in Harrisburg, Pennsylvania
- WIUW in Warsaw, Illinois
- WJHW in Mayodan, North Carolina
- WJMU in Decatur, Illinois
- WJRF in Duluth, Minnesota
- WKMT (FM) in Fulton, Kentucky
- WKPB in Henderson, Kentucky
- WLJV in Spotsylvania, Virginia
- WLPS-FM in Lumberton, North Carolina
- WMAE-FM in Booneville, Mississippi
- WMFV in Cedar Creek, Florida
- WMIH in Geneva, Ohio
- WMOT in Murfreesboro, Tennessee
- WNCK in Nantucket, Massachusetts
- WNGU in Dahlonega, Georgia
- WNIJ in DeKalb, Illinois
- WNNU in Great Barrington, Massachusetts
- WNTE in Mansfield, Pennsylvania
- WOFR in Schoolcraft, Michigan
- WOVI in Novi, Michigan
- WPCS (FM) in Pensacola, Florida
- WPKN in Bridgeport, Connecticut
- WPRG in Columbia, Mississippi
- WQAI in Thomson, Georgia
- WQRP in Dayton, Ohio
- WRNF in Selma, Alabama
- WSCL in Salisbury, Maryland
- WSKB in Westfield, Massachusetts
- WSLU in Canton, New York
- WSOM in Franklin, Indiana
- WSOU in South Orange, New Jersey
- WSPI in Ellsworth, Illinois
- WTJY in Asheboro, North Carolina
- WUNY in Utica, New York
- WUUA in Glen Spey, New York
- WVDS in Petersburg, West Virginia
- WVMS (FM) in Sandusky, Ohio
- WVPR in Windsor, Vermont
- WWPJ in Pen Argyl, Pennsylvania
- WWTP in Augusta, Maine
- WYAZ in Yazoo City, Mississippi
- WYFK in Columbus, Georgia
- WYFS in Savannah, Georgia
- WYFW in Winder, Georgia
- WYNJ in Blackduck, Minnesota
- WYPA in Cherry Hill, New Jersey
- WZWP in West Union, Ohio
