= WNTE =

WNTE may refer to:

- WNTE (FM), a radio station (89.5) licensed to serve Mansfield, Pennsylvania
- WNTE-LD, a television station (channel 30, virtual 36) licensed to serve Mayaguez, Puerto Rico
- WNTE, World-harmonized Not-to-Exceed, Engine emission off-cycle limits
