= WJYM =

- Bowling Green, Ohio; United States
- Broadcast area: Toledo metropolitan area
- Frequency: 730 kHz
- Branding: Son Life Radio

Programming
- Format: Christian radio

Ownership
- Owner: Jimmy Swaggart Ministries; (Family Worship Center Church, Inc.)

History
- First air date: December 1954
- Call sign meaning: "Jimmy"

Technical information
- Licensing authority: FCC
- Class: D
- Power: 1,000 watts (day); 359 watts (night)
- Transmitter coordinates: 41°31′57″N 83°33′55″W
- Translator: 106.9 W295DB (Bowling Green)

Links
- Public license information: Public file; LMS
- Website: sonlifetv.com

WJYM (730 AM) is a noncommercial radio station licensed to Bowling Green, Ohio, United States, and serving the Toledo metropolitan area. It broadcasts a Christian radio format, and is owned by the ministry of televangelist Jimmy Swaggart. The studios and transmitter are on Fremont Pike (U.S. Route 20 - U.S. Route 23) near Lime City Road in Lime City, Ohio.

WJYM programming is also heard over low-power FM translator W295DB at 106.9 MHz.

== History ==
=== Beginnings as WHRW ===
The station first signed on the air in December 1954. The original call sign was WHRW, selected as the initials of its then-owner and founder, Howard R. Ward. It was a daytimer with a power of 250 watts using two towers and required to go off the air at sunset. Ward served as the president and general manager. By the end of the 1950s, the station was given permission to increase its power to 1,000 watts, but still days only. The studios were at the transmitter facility.

Ward was famous for stunting including a fight he had with General Telephone (GTE) concerning a teletype circuit which they could not provide to his station in rural Bowling Green. Ward purchased an old truck and painted "WTLG Carrier Pigeon News Service" on the side. He made a ceremony each day of driving it through the streets of Bowling Green to supposedly return his birds for dispatch of news releases out to his station from downtown. The local papers and wire services picked up on the story which embarrassed GTE. When GTE still would not budge he announced that he was giving away a free savings bond to the 10th caller to his station. He did not answer the phones during the contest and successfully locked up the GTE system in Bowling Green several times until the company obtained an injunction against him.

On July 1, 1961, Ward sold WHRW to H. Max Good.

=== As WMGS ===
After WHRW was sold to Good, the studios and offices were moved to the Waldorf Hotel in Toledo, as the recent power increase afforded the station with full market signal penetration. The relocation to Toledo did not last long and the station returned to the Bowling Green area, taking space along Main Street. The call letters were then changed to WMGS, to reflect the positioning statement "with more good sounds", though some station insiders referred to "Max Good's Station" as the more accurate translation.

The station was silent until it moved to the present location in Lime City. It returned to the air with 1,000 watts, days only, using four towers. The Program Director was George Mishler who also hosted middays. The morning drive time DJ was Roy Blair, and the afternoon host was Jim Hamilton. The music was middle of the road (MOR). When the format changed to country music, George Mishler went to work for the Voice of America (VOA) in Washington, D.C. He ultimately became a manager of Special English programming. Jim Hamilton headed for Chicago, and Roy Blair went to Bowling Green State University to complete his B.A. in English. During this time, Roy announced for WFOB AM/FM, Fostoria and began work at WSPD AM after graduation. After WSPD AM, Roy was next heard on WJBK-TV 2, Detroit.

Under the country format, the DJs including Jim Bonnett as "Big Jim", who also was the station manager until 1966; Roger Price as "Pistol Pete" and program director from 1962 to 1966, Johnny Dauro as "Lonesome John" and manager from 1966 to 1970; Roy Blair as "Cousin Roy", George Lubgate as "Tiny Tim"; Ron Kitchen as "Ron the Dude" and program director in 1966; Lowell Thomas (Not the famous newscaster) as "L.T."; Bob Zrake as "Buffalo Bob"; Jerry Kiefer as program director in 1972; Earl Sharninghouse as "Rick Allen" and program director and Chief engineer from 1972 to 1973; Ken Robey as "Ken Roberts"; Dennis Rutherford as Chief engineer and part-time air talent in 1973; Klaus Helfers as "J.P. Jones"; and The Reverend Max Good, who preached daily.

=== As WJYM ===
On October 14, 1976, WMGS was sold to the Jimmy Swaggart Evangelistic Association, and became WJYM "Son Life Radio." The call letters are evocative of the name "Jim", after owner Jimmy Swaggart. For many years, the station operated locally with a full staff of approximately 12. In the mid 1990s, WJYM carried live broadcasts of Bowling Green State University football and basketball games through an airtime purchase agreement with WFOB, which wanted to extend the broadcast range (thus increase its advertising revenues) for its BGSU sports programming. Because of Jimmy Swaggart Ministries’ religious objections to alcohol consumption, WJYM staff manually played custom intros, outros, and replacement advertisements whenever the WFOB feed carried any mentions of their flagship sports sponsor, Budweiser.

By 1980, the station's on-air operations moved to its transmitter facility along Fremont Pike in Lime City, where they remained for the rest of the 20th Century. Advances made in hard-disk computer-based broadcast automation and the Telecommunications Act of 1996 was passed, which relieved many stations of the main studio rule that required a studio and management presence within close proximity of the community of license. At that point, on-air functions were moved to the ministry's headquarters in Baton Rouge, Louisiana. Though station signage remains outside the transmitter facility, it is, for the most part, unattended. Except for some computerized local announcements, WJYM is basically a simulcast of WJFM, the flagship station for Jimmy Swaggart Ministries.
