= KQJK =

KQJK may refer to:

- KCHQ (FM), a radio station (100.1 FM) licensed to serve Soda Springs, Idaho, United States, which held the call sign KQJK from 2017 to 2018
- KYRV, a radio station (93.7 FM) licensed to serve Roseville, California, United States, which held the call sign KQJK from 2005 to 2017
