= XHRRR-FM =

XHRRR-FM may refer to:

- XHRRR-FM (Jalisco) in Encarnación de Díaz, 89.5 RRR FM
- XHRRR-FM (Veracruz) in Papantla de Olarte, La Huasteca 89.3 FM
