= WPFC =

WPRC may refer to:

- WPFC (AM), a radio station (1550 AM) licensed to Baton Rouge, Louisiana, United States
- Wellington Phoenix FC, a football club
- West Perth Football Club, an Australian Rules Football Team in Western Australia
- Wodson Park F.C.
- Worcester Park F.C.
- Worksop Parramore F.C.
