= WGRN =

WGRN may refer to:

- WGRN (FM), a radio station (89.5 FM) licensed to serve Greenville, Illinois, United States
- WGRN-LP, a low-power radio station (91.9 FM) licensed to serve Columbus, Ohio, United States; see List of radio stations in Ohio
