= WLPS =

WLPS may refer to:

- WLPS-FM, a radio station (89.5 FM) licensed to serve Lumberton, North Carolina, United States
- WTNG-CD, a low-power television station (channel 14) licensed to serve Lumberton-Pembroke, North Carolina, which held the call sign WLPS-LD or WLPS-CD from 2007 to 2018
