= KBCC =

KBCC may refer to:

- KBCC-LP, a defunct low-power radio station (107.9 FM) formerly licensed to serve Cave Junction, Oregon, United States
- KUHM-TV, a PBS member station in Helena, Montana, United States, which held the call sign KBCC from 1997 to 1998
- KVSJ-FM, a radio station (89.5 FM) licensed to serve Tracy, California, United States, which held the call sign KBCC from 2017 to 2020
