= XHCG-FM =

Radio station in Nogales, Sonora, Mexico

XECG-AM/XHCG-FM
- Nogales, Sonora; Mexico
- Frequencies: 1240 kHz; 89.5 FM (HD Radio)
- Branding: La Poderosa

Programming
- Format: Regional Mexican

Ownership
- Owner: Grupo Radiorama; (Radio Nogales, S. de R.L.)
- Sister stations: XHHN-FM, XHSN-FM

History
- First air date: February 15, 1952

Technical information
- Licensing authority: CRT
- Class: A (FM); C (AM)
- Power: 1 kW (AM)
- ERP: 1.25 kW (FM)
- HAAT: 22.1 m (73 ft) (FM)
- Transmitter coordinates: 31°17′31.2″N 110°56′45.2″W

Links
- Webcast: Listen live
- Website: radioramasonora.com

XECG-AM/XHCG-FM is a radio station on 1240 AM and 89.5 FM in Nogales, Sonora, Mexico. It is owned by Grupo Radiorama and is known as La Poderosa with a regional mexican format.

== History ==
XECG received its concession on February 15, 1952. The 250-watt station raised power to 500 watts in the 1980s and 1,000 watts by the 2000s.

In 2018, XECG ditched its romantic format for pop using the Grupo Radiorama (Pereda Gómez) @FM format. It would be the last format used under Grupo Larsa Comunicaciones management, as Radiovisa took over XHCG and XHHN-FM upon the signing on of the FM frequencies in November 2018, instituting new formats.

On July 7, 2019, ISA Medios, an outdoor advertising company which had the previous month entered broadcasting in Ciudad Obregón, by assuming operations of XHCG and XHHN-FM 89.9. It immediately flipped XHCG to La Ke Buena format from Radiópolis.

This station reverted to Radiorama control, until January 1, 2022
