= WXMM =

WXMM may refer to:

- WXMM-LP, a low-power radio station (100.1 FM) licensed to serve Galax, Virginia, United States
- WFOG-LP, a low-power radio station (95.9 FM) licensed to serve Hillsville, Virginia, which held the call sign WXMM-LP from 2014 to 2016
- WKZY, a radio station (92.9 FM) licensed to serve Chilton, Wisconsin, United States, which held the call sign WXMM from 2011 to 2013
