= XHUACS-FM =

University radio station in Saltillo, Coahuila

- Saltillo; Mexico
- Frequency: 104.1 MHz
- Branding: Radio Universidad

Programming
- Format: University radio

Ownership
- Owner: Universidad Autónoma de Coahuila
- Sister stations: XHUCT-FM

History
- First air date: May 8, 2013
- Call sign meaning: Universidad Autónoma de Coahuila/Saltillo

Technical information
- Licensing authority: CRT
- Class: A
- ERP: 2.91 kW
- HAAT: −130.9 m (−429 ft)
- Transmitter coordinates: 25°22′33″N 101°00′37.34″W

Links
- Webcast: mixlr.com/radio-universidad-saltillo-1041/
- Website: www.facebook.com/104.1RadioUniversidad

XHUACS-FM is a radio station serving Saltillo owned by the Universidad Autónoma de Coahuila. It is branded as Radio Universidad and broadcasts on 104.1 FM from its campus.

The station came to air on May 8, 2013.

It shares programming with XHUCT-FM 89.5 in Torreón, which is the other radio station operated by the university.
