= XHXK-FM =

Radio station in Poza Rica, Veracruz, Mexico

- Poza Rica, Veracruz; Mexico
- Frequency: 100.1 FM
- Branding: Radio Fórmula

Programming
- Format: News/talk

Ownership
- Owner: Grupo Fórmula; (Transmisora Regional Radio Fórmula, S.A. de C.V.)

History
- First air date: January 20, 1972 (concession)
- Former call signs: XEXK-AM
- Former frequencies: 1080 kHz

Technical information
- Licensing authority: CRT
- Class: B1
- ERP: 25,000 watts
- HAAT: 25.5 m
- Transmitter coordinates: 20°33′12.8″N 97°25′33.9″W

Links
- Webcast: Listen live
- Website: radioformula.com.mx

XHXK-FM is a radio station on 100.1 FM in Poza Rica, Veracruz, Mexico, owned and operated by Radio Fórmula.

== History ==
XEXK-AM 1080 received its concession on January 20, 1972. It was owned by Radio Poza Rica, S.A. and operated as a 250-watt daytimer. In 1978, 1986 and 1987, technical changes were approved boosting the station to 500 watts (in 1978), adding a 100-watt nighttime service (in 1986) and increasing that to 250 watts (in 1987). It further boosted power to 10,000 watts in 1994 and was sold to Radio Fórmula in 2000.

XEXK was authorized to move to FM in November 2010 and soon after moved to its own transmitter site, separate from Radiorama Poza Rica.
