= XHRV-FM =

Radio station in Valle Hermoso, Tamaulipas, Mexico

- Valle Hermoso, Tamaulipas; Mexico
- Broadcast area: Matamoros, Tamaulipas, Mexico; Brownsville, Texas, United States
- Frequency: 89.5 (MHz)
- Branding: La Mera Mera 89.5

Programming
- Language: Spanish
- Format: Regional Mexican

Ownership
- Owner: Libertas Radio; (Comercial Libertas, S.A. de C.V.)

History
- First air date: November 23, 1994 (concession)
- Former call signs: XHSAF-FM (1994–1998)

Technical information
- Licensing authority: CRT
- Class: C1
- ERP: 100,000 watts
- HAAT: 0.8 m (2 ft 7 in)
- Transmitter coordinates: 25°45′02″N 97°48′56″W

Links
- Website: lameramera895.wixsite.com/lameramera895

XHRV-FM is a radio station on 89.5 MHz in Valle Hermoso, Tamaulipas, Mexico.

== History ==
XHRV's concession history begins in San Fernando, Tamaulipas. On November 23, 1994, Libertas received the concession for XHSAF-FM 100.9. XHSAF became XHRV-FM on April 27, 1998 (a later XHSAF-FM on the same frequency in the same town was awarded just months later for the Radio Tamaulipas state network, now the permit expired).

In 2006, XHRV conducted a move into the Río Grande Valley by soliciting a move to Valle Hermoso.

Between 2012 and 2020, the station aired the Exa FM pop format from MVS Radio.
