= KMQX =

Radio station in Weatherford, Texas

Coordinates: 32.852°N 98.109°W

- Weatherford, Texas; United States
- Broadcast area: Mineral Wells/Weatherford
- Frequency: 88.5 MHz
- Branding: The Coyote

Programming
- Format: Community/Variety/Adult hits

Ownership
- Owner: Weatherford Community College District
- Sister stations: KYQX, KSQX

History
- First air date: 2003

Technical information
- Licensing authority: FCC
- Facility ID: 89176
- Class: C3
- ERP: 3,500 watts
- HAAT: 158 meters
- Translator: (102.5 MHz) K273CP (Mineral Wells)

Links
- Public license information: Public file; LMS
- Webcast: Listen live
- Website: KMQX Website

KMQX (88.5 FM) is a community radio station licensed to the Weatherford Community College District. The station serves the area around Mineral Wells, Weatherford, and Jacksboro.
