= KDJR =

Radio station in De Soto, Missouri

- De Soto, Missouri; United States
- Frequency: 100.1 MHz

Programming
- Format: Christian talk and teaching - Christian music

Ownership
- Owner: Family Worship Center Church

Technical information
- Licensing authority: FCC
- Facility ID: 5279
- Class: A
- ERP: 2,000 watts
- HAAT: 106.0 meters (347.8 ft)
- Transmitter coordinates: 38°1′25″N 90°34′2″W

Links
- Public license information: Public file; LMS
- Website: http://sonlifetv.com

KDJR (100.1 FM) is a non-commercial radio station broadcasting a radio format mixing Christian talk and teaching and Christian music. It is licensed to De Soto, Missouri, serving the suburbs south of St. Louis. The station is owned by the Family Worship Center Church, founded by televangelist Jimmy Swaggart.

KDJR is a Class A FM station. It has an effective radiated power (ERP) of 2,000 watts.
