= XHRRR-FM (Jalisco) =

Radio station in Encarnación de Díaz, Jalisco, Mexico

- Encarnacion de Diaz, Jalisco; Mexico
- Broadcast area: Aguascalientes
- Frequency: 89.5 FM
- Branding: RRR

Programming
- Language: English
- Format: Noncommercial music

Ownership
- Owner: Grupo Radiofónico Zer; (Rodrigo Rodríguez Reyes)
- Sister stations: XHJTF-FM, XHAGA-FM, XHARZ-FM, XHEY-FM, XHDC-FM, XHLTZ-FM

History
- First air date: June 2013 (permit)
- Call sign meaning: Rodrigo Rodríguez Reyes

Technical information
- Licensing authority: CRT
- Class: C1
- ERP: 15 kW
- HAAT: 447.6 meters (1,469 ft)
- Transmitter coordinates: 21°39′36″N 102°13′39″W

Links
- Webcast: Listen live
- Website: grupozer.mx

XHRRR-FM is a noncommercial radio station in Encarnación de Díaz, Jalisco, Mexico, serving the Aguascalientes area. The station is owned by Grupo Radiofónico Zer, and its permit is held by Rodrigo Rodríguez Reyes. XHRRR broadcasts from a tower on Cerro de los Gallos, a mountain on the Aguascalientes-Jalisco border used to provide television service to Aguascalientes.
