= WLJV =

- Spotsylvania, Virginia; United States
- Broadcast area: Fredericksburg, Virginia; Spotsylvania County, Virginia; Caroline County, Virginia
- Frequency: 89.5 MHz
- Branding: K-Love

Programming
- Format: Contemporary Christian

Ownership
- Owner: Educational Media Foundation

History
- First air date: November 6, 2005
- Former call signs: WWED (2005–2014); WYAU (2014–2017)

Technical information
- Licensing authority: FCC
- Facility ID: 90679
- Class: B1
- Power: 8,000 Watts
- HAAT: 151 meters (495 ft)
- Transmitter coordinates: 38°11′48.0″N 77°33′45.0″W

Links
- Public license information: Public file; LMS
- Webcast: Listen Live
- Website: www.klove.com

WLJV (89.5 MHz) is a non-commercial FM radio station licensed to Spotsylvania, Virginia, serving the City of Fredericksburg along with Spotsylvania and Caroline Counties in Virginia. WLJV is owned by Educational Media Foundation, and broadcasts the Christian contemporary music radio format from the co-owned K-Love Network.

== History ==
In 2005, WWED signed on the air. It was owned by the religious-based Educational Media Corporation of Spotsylvania Courthouse, Virginia. (The Educational Media Corporation is not related to the current owner, the Educational Media Foundation.) The station ran various genres of contemporary Christian and Southern gospel music until 2012. It then changed to a classical music format. During this time, WWED's programming was simulcast on WWEM in Rustburg, Virginia, serving the Lynchburg media market.

In June 2014, Educational Media Corporation sold both stations. American University announced a deal to purchase WWED for $375,000, making it a simulcast of NPR member station WAMU in Washington, D.C. WAMU purchased the station in order to compete with WVTF, which had signed on repeater WQIQ as the area's first NPR station the previous year. The changeover to WAMU programming was made in October 2014, including a call sign change to WYAU.

WAMU sold the station to Educational Media Foundation on October 4, 2017, for $400,000. On December 7, WAMU unexpectedly took WYAU dark, as it was starting a pledge drive and believed it would be unethical to solicit pledges from those who would lose access to its programming. The sale was granted on November 28 and closed on December 21, at which point the station changed its call sign to WLJV. WLJV returned to air with K-Love programming on January 5, 2018.
