= WJFM =

SonLife Radio Network flagship station in Baton Rouge, Louisiana

SonLife Radio Flagship station
- Baton Rouge, Louisiana; United States
- Broadcast area: Baton Rouge metropolitan area
- Frequency: 88.5 MHz
- Branding: SonLife Radio Network

Programming
- Language: English
- Format: Christian radio
- Network: SonLife Radio

Ownership
- Owner: Jimmy Swaggart Ministries; (Family Worship Center Church, Inc.)

History
- Call sign meaning: Jimmy Swaggart Ministries FM Station

Technical information
- Licensing authority: FCC
- Facility ID: 31171
- Class: C2
- ERP: 25,500 watts
- HAAT: 85 meters (279 ft)
- Transmitter coordinates: 30°23′06″N 91°05′23″W
- Translator: See § Translators

Links
- Public license information: Public file; LMS
- Webcast: Listen live; Listen live (via iHeartRadio)
- Website: www.sonlifetv.com

WJFM (88.5 FM) is a non-commercial radio station broadcasting a Christian radio format. Licensed to Baton Rouge, Louisiana, the station is currently owned by Jimmy Swaggart Ministries. The listener-supported station is run by SonLife Radio, a ministry of Jimmy Swaggart Ministries.

Its programming is also broadcast full-time on co-owned KCKR (91.1 FM) serving Lafayette, Louisiana, WQUA (102.1 FM) serving the Mobile Alabama area; WJYM (730 AM) serving Bowling Green/Toledo, Ohio area; and WFFL (91.7 FM) serving Panama City, Florida; and WGSG (89.5 FM) serving Lake City, Florida. SonLife Radio is also broadcast full-time on a growing network of broadcast translators around the U.S., mostly in the south and west.

The station has been programming this format since 1995, and offers programming from the Family Worship Center and Jimmy Swaggart Ministries.

== History ==
For nearly 30 years (1962–1992), The WJFM calls were assigned to Western Michigan's 320,000-watt powerhouse FM station 93.7FM. However, when the station was sold and switched formats, the WJFM calls were dropped and changed to WBCT.

== Translators ==
In addition to the main station, WJFM is relayed by an additional 40 translators nationwide:

Call sign	Frequency (MHz)	City of license	State	Class	ERP (W)	FCC info
W205BX	88.9	Eufaula	Alabama	D	13	FCC (W205BX)
K209DT	89.7	El Dorado	Arkansas	D	38	FCC (K209DT)
W213BF	90.5	Key West	Florida	D	50	FCC (W213BF)
W215BM	90.9	Dublin	Georgia	D	13	FCC (W215BM)
W212BL	90.3	Lagrange	Georgia	D	10	FCC (W212BL)
W214BG	90.7	Waycross	Georgia	D	38	FCC (W214BG)
W211BJ	90.1	Crossville	Illinois	D	38	FCC (W211BJ)
W204BG	88.7	Effingham	Illinois	D	19	FCC (W204BG)
W201BL	88.1	Jacksonville	Illinois	D	27	FCC (W201BL)
K208DW	89.5	De Ridder	Louisiana	D	20	FCC (K208DW)
K220ID	91.9	Grayson	Louisiana	D	10	FCC (K220ID)
K217EC	91.3	Many	Louisiana	D	19	FCC (K217EC)
K216EX	91.1	Minden	Louisiana	D	38	FCC (K216EX)
K211DY	90.1	Natchitoches	Louisiana	D	10	FCC (K211DY)
K219FA	91.7	Alexandria	Minnesota	D	50	FCC (K219FA)
K213DN	90.5	Morris	Minnesota	D	27	FCC (K213DN)
W202BS	88.3	Columbia	Mississippi	D	13	FCC (W202BS)
K201GD	88.1	Kirksville	Missouri	D	10	FCC (K201GD)
K219FD	91.7	Mountain Grove	Missouri	D	50	FCC (K219FD)
K207DG	89.3	Rosati	Missouri	D	140	FCC (K207DG)
K218DC	91.5	Springfield	Missouri	D	250	FCC (K218DC)
K213DK	90.5	Willow Springs	Missouri	D	50	FCC (K213DK)
K209EG	89.7	Artesia	New Mexico	D	25	FCC (K209EG)
K208ED	89.5	Deming	New Mexico	D	50	FCC (K208ED)
W208BC	89.5	Corning	New York	D	10	FCC (W208BC)
W220DD	91.9	Morehead City	North Carolina	D	50	FCC (W220DD)
W202BR	88.3	Rockingham	North Carolina	D	10	FCC (W202BR)
W209BN	89.7	Chambersburg	Pennsylvania	D	10	FCC (W209BN)
W212BK	90.3	Franklin	Pennsylvania	D	10	FCC (W212BK)
W207BM	89.3	Lock Haven	Pennsylvania	D	10	FCC (W207BM)
W218BN	91.5	Mansfield	Pennsylvania	D	10	FCC (W218BN)
W204BQ	88.7	Andrews	South Carolina	D	55	FCC (W204BQ)
W204BR	88.7	Manning	South Carolina	D	50	FCC (W204BR)
W215CK	90.9	Winnsboro	South Carolina	D	10	FCC (W215CK)
K209DX	89.7	Brookings	South Dakota	D	250	FCC (K209DX)
K211EC	90.1	Watertown	South Dakota	D	100	FCC (K211EC)
W217BG	91.3	Pikeville	Tennessee	D	10	FCC (W217BG)
K216FD	91.1	Columbus	Texas	D	40	FCC (K216FD)
K219FH	91.7	Midland	Texas	D	50	FCC (K219FH)
K219LU	91.7	Bishop	California	D	10	FCC (K219LU)
