= XHRCH-FM =

Radio station in Ojinaga, Chihuahua, Mexico

- Ojinaga, Chihuahua; Mexico
- Frequency: 100.1 MHz
- Branding: Estéreo Romance

Programming
- Format: Romantic

Ownership
- Owner: Grupo BM Radio; (Gerardo Quezada Vargas)

History
- First air date: December 13, 1973 (concession)

Technical information
- Licensing authority: CRT
- Class: AA
- ERP: 5.14 kW
- HAAT: 18.81 m (61.7 ft)
- Transmitter coordinates: 29°32′26″N 104°23′44″W

Links
- Website: gbmradio.com

XHRCH-FM is a radio station on 100.1 FM in Ojinaga, Chihuahua, Mexico. The station is owned by Grupo BM Radio and carries a romantic format known as Estéreo Romance.

== History ==
XHRCH received its concession as XERCH-AM 1340 on December 13, 1973. It was owned by Jaime Hernández Pérez Rulfo.

It migrated to FM in 2011, by which time it was owned by Radio Grupo Chihuahua, a Radiorama subsidiary. In 2015, the station applied to reduce its power from 25 kW to 5.14 kW on a higher tower; it was also sold to its current owner.
