= XHHPC-FM =

Radio station in Hidalgo del Parral, Chihuahua, Mexico

- Hidalgo del Parral, Chihuahua; Mexico
- Frequency: 100.1 FM
- Branding: Mágica

Programming
- Format: Romantic

Ownership
- Owner: Grupo Radiorama; (Plataforma en Difusión, S.A. de C.V.)

History
- First air date: AM: April 7, 1997 (concession)
- Call sign meaning: Hidalgo del Parral Chihuahua

Technical information
- Licensing authority: CRT
- Class: B1
- ERP: 10 kW
- HAAT: 193.11 m (633.6 ft)
- Transmitter coordinates: 26°57′16.92″N 105°41′25.36″W

Links
- Webcast: Listen live
- Website: radiorama.mx

XHHPC-FM is a radio station on 100.1 FM in Hidalgo del Parral, Chihuahua, Mexico. It is owned by Grupo Radiorama and carries its Mágica romantic format.

== History ==
XEHPC-AM 1490 received its concession on April 7, 1997. It was owned by Radiorama subsidiary Comunicación y Cultura, S.A. XEHPC moved to 1000 kHz within a decade signing on, which allowed it to boost its nighttime power from 100 watts to 500.

XEHPC received approval to migrate to FM in 2011. In 2015, its facilities moved to Cerro El Ángulo and the station decreased power from 25 kW to 10.
