= XHHN-FM =

Radio station in Nogales, Sonora, Mexico

- Nogales, Sonora; Mexico
- Frequency: 89.9 MHz (HD Radio)
- Branding: Studio

Programming
- Format: English and Spanish Classic Hits

Ownership
- Owner: Grupo Radiorama; (XEHN, S.A. de C.V.)
- Sister stations: XHCG-FM, XHSN-FM

History
- First air date: November 29, 1972
- Former call signs: XEHN-AM (1972-2026)
- Former frequencies: 1240 KHz (1972-2026)

Technical information
- Licensing authority: CRT
- Class: A
- ERP: 1.25 kW
- HAAT: 9.1 m (30 ft)
- Transmitter coordinates: 31°17′31.2″N 110°56′45.2″W

Links
- Webcast: Listen live
- Website: radioramasonora.com

XHHN-FM is a radio station on 89.9 FM in Nogales, Sonora, Mexico. It is owned by Grupo Radiorama and carries a Classic Hits format known as Studio.

== History ==
Javier Manzanera Contreras received the concession for XEHN on November 29, 1972. It was later sold in 1982, became a Radiorama affiliate and was spun off to Larsa.

Radiovisa took over XHHN and XHCG-FM upon the signing on of the FM frequencies in November 2018, instituting new formats.

On July 7, 2019, ISA Medios, an outdoor advertising company which had the previous month entered broadcasting in Ciudad Obregón, by assuming operations of XHCG and XHHN-FM 89.5. XHHN became the Los 40 station for Nogales.

This station reverted to Radiorama control, until January 1, 2022
