= Weatherford College =

Community college in Weatherford, Texas, US

Coordinates: 32°44.431′N 97°47.524′W

- Type: Public community college
- Established: March 1869
- President: Tod Allen Farmer
- Students: 7,275
- Location: Weatherford, Texas, United States
- Colors: Black and Gold
- Mascot: Coyote
- Website: www.wc.edu

Weatherford College (WC) is a public community college in Weatherford, Texas, with a branch campus in nearby Wise County.

== Organization and administration ==
As defined by the Texas Legislature, the official service area of WC includes all of Jack, Palo Pinto, Parker, Hood, and Wise Counties.

Ultimate responsibility for governance of the college is vested by state statute in a district board of trustees with seven members. Executive responsibility for administering policies of the board is delegated to the president of the college, who is assisted by the administrative officers.

== Student life ==
=== Athletics ===
Weatherford College participates in baseball, basketball, tennis, golf, and rodeo for men and softball, basketball, tennis, golf, cross country and volleyball for women.

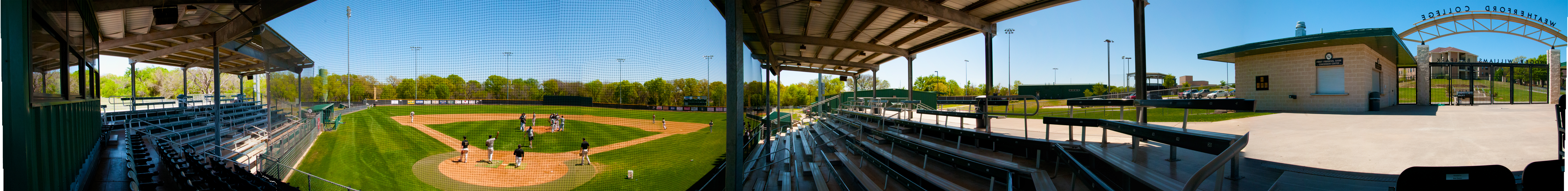
Roger Williams Ballpark

Baseball

In baseball, 34 former Coyote players have played professionally, including four in Major League Baseball (MLB):

- Jake Arrieta (born 1986), MLB player for the Philadelphia Phillies
- Ryan Brasier, MLB pitcher and World Series champion with the Boston Red Sox
- German Duran, MLB infielder
- Tejay Antone, MLB player for the Cincinnati Reds

Basketball

- Harvey Catchings, former professional basketball player
- Olga Firsova, former professional basketball player
- Leta Andrews holds the record for most wins by a high-school basketball coach.
- Stedman Graham, an American educator, author, businessman, and public speaker

Golf

- Jerod Turner, professional golfer

=== Student housing ===
In the fall of 2003, Weatherford College opened a new, on-campus, student community known Coyote Village. A unique alternative to traditional dormitory living, the facility features apartment-style, two- and four-bedroom suites for 280 students. Construction began in 2022 on a new residence hall on campus.

In the fall of 2024, Durant Hall was opened. This 118-room facility maintains four-bedroom suites similar to Coyote Village. Named after long-time Weatherford College supporters Vickie and Jerry Durant, this building is noteworthy for its Western ski lodge-like decor, including floor-to-ceiling fireplaces and elkhorn chandeliers.

== See also ==
- KMQX
