= WPFC (AM) =

- Baton Rouge, Louisiana; United States
- Frequency: 1550 kHz
- Branding: The Urban Alternative

Programming
- Format: Urban Gospel, Talk

Ownership
- Owner: Pastor Ralph Moore; (Victory & Power Ministries)

History
- First air date: 1963
- Former call signs: WLUX (1963–1995)

Technical information
- Licensing authority: FCC
- Facility ID: 31172
- Class: D
- Power: 5,000 watts day 42 watts night
- Transmitter coordinates: 30°30′7.00″N 91°12′39.00″W

Links
- Public license information: Public file; LMS
- Website: wpfc1550am.com

WPFC (1550 AM) is a radio station broadcasting an urban gospel/talk format licensed to operate in Baton Rouge, Louisiana, United States. The station is currently owned by pastor Ralph Moore.

== History ==
James A. Noe obtained the construction permit for 1550, originally WUNE and WYNE, in 1961. In 1963, the station was sold to KCIL, Inc., which built it and gave it the callsign it used when it signed on, WLUX. The station was a 5,000-watt daytimer.

In 1971, Capital City Communications, which had bought WLUX in 1967, went bankrupt. The station's license had been filed for renewal in 1970, but the Federal Communications Commission designated it for hearing because of a litany of issues, namely allegations of an unauthorized transfer of control, inaccurate ownership reports and improper operation of the radio station. With the station in receivership, a sale was attempted to United Broadcast Industries, Inc. The FCC denied the renewal of the license and canceled the sale, saying that renewing WLUX's license to operate would allow the owners of Capital City, described as having "utter disregard" for FCC rules, to benefit.

However, WLUX was eventually spared. Edwin A. LaRose, the receiver, challenged the FCC's denial in the appeals court and won, with the appeals court finding that LaRose was acting within his bounds as a receiver and that the FCC committed an "abuse of discretion" in refusing to consider a license renewal for the station. LaRose had found another buyer, a local television preacher named Jimmy Swaggart. The FCC approved the sale of WLUX to Swaggart, and the renewal of the license, on December 18, 1974, noting that Swaggart was not connected in any way with the wrongdoing committed by Capital City that prompted the license revocation. The 1973 license renewal was then approved in 1977. For the next 18 years, Swaggart owned and operated WLUX.

In 1994, Swaggart's ministry built an FM station, WJFM 88.5, and moved his religious programming there. Swaggart then sold the station to Victory & Power Ministries, headed by the pastor Ralph Moore. The station primarily broadcasts religious programming from a variety of local Christian ministries.
