= Roger Williams Ballpark =

Baseball venue in Weatherford, Texas, US

Coordinates: 32.74027°N 97.78691°W

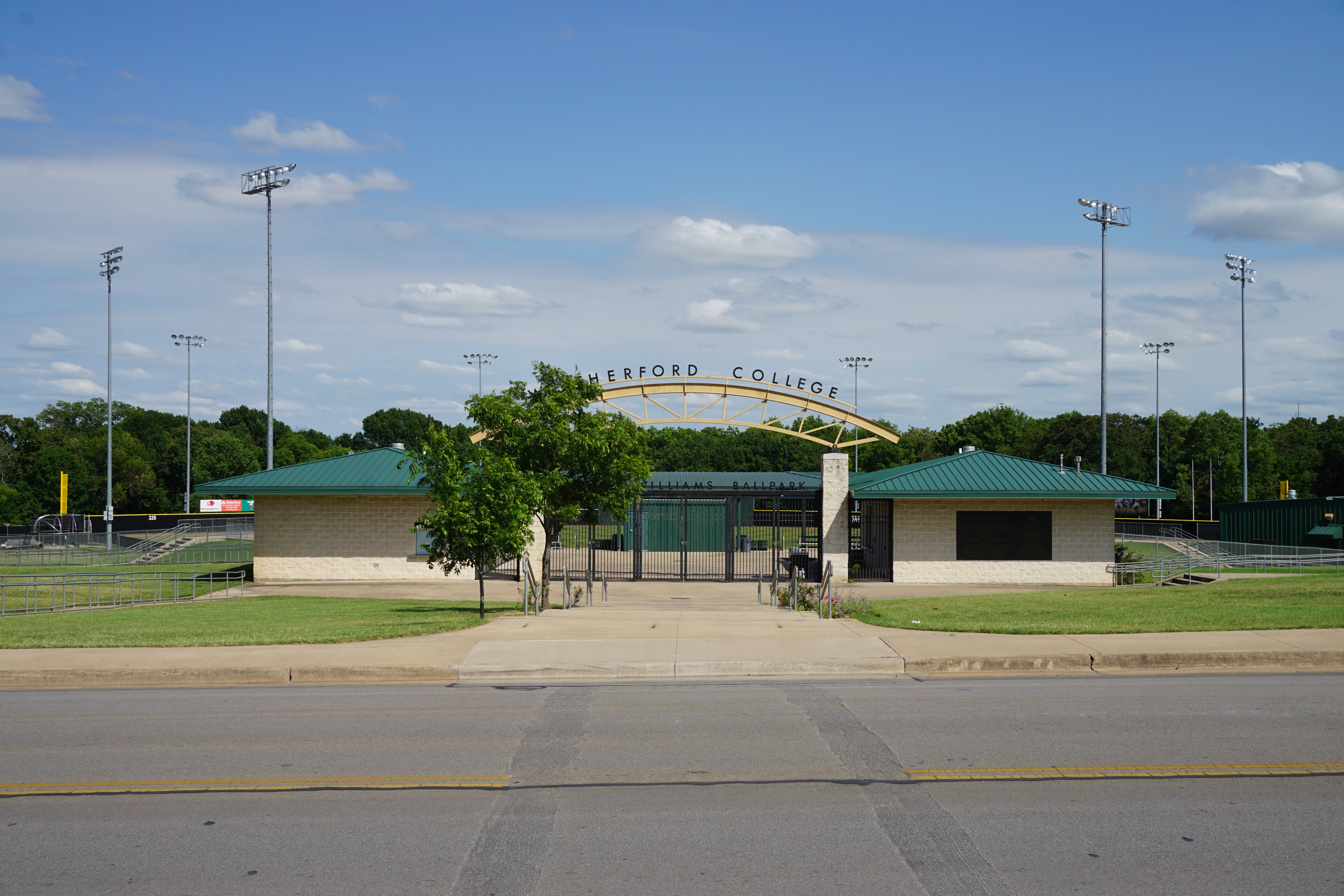
Roger Williams Ballpark

Roger Williams Ballpark is a baseball venue located in Weatherford, Texas. It was the home of the TCL Weatherford Wranglers from 2004 to 2007. The field is also the home of the Weatherford College Coyotes baseball team.
