= CKAG-FM =

Coordinates: 48°35′55″N 78°07′38″W

- Pikogan, Quebec; Canada
- Frequency: 100.1 MHz

Programming
- Language: French

Ownership
- Owner: Société de communication Ikito Pikogan

History
- First air date: 1992

Technical information
- Class: A
- ERP: 3.738 kWs
- HAAT: 38.4 metres (126 ft)

CKAG-FM is a French-language First Nations community radio station that operates at 100.1 FM in Pikogan, Quebec, Canada.

Owned by Société de communication Ikito Pikogan, the station received CRTC approval in 1992.
