= WGSG =

Radio station in Mayo, Florida

- Mayo, Florida; United States
- Broadcast area: Lake City, Florida
- Frequency: 89.5 MHz
- Branding: SonLife Radio

Programming
- Format: Christian

Ownership
- Owner: Jimmy Swaggart Ministries; (Family Worship Center Church, Inc.)

History
- Call sign meaning: Witnessing God's Saving Grace

Technical information
- Licensing authority: FCC
- Facility ID: 68201
- Class: C3
- ERP: 20,000 watts
- HAAT: 76.0 meters
- Transmitter coordinates: 30°2′30.00″N 83°7′45.00″W

Links
- Public license information: Public file; LMS
- Webcast: Listen Live
- Website: www.sonlifetv.com

WGSG (89.5 FM) is a radio station broadcasting a Christian format. Licensed to Mayo, Florida, United States, the station is currently owned by Jimmy Swaggart Ministries.
