= KYQX =

Radio station in Weatherford, Texas

Coordinates: 32.852°N 98.109°W

- Weatherford, Texas; United States
- Broadcast area: Weatherford and Vicinity
- Frequency: 89.3 MHz
- Branding: Pure Country

Programming
- Format: Classic country

Ownership
- Owner: CSSI Non-Profit Educational Broadcasting Corporation
- Sister stations: KEQX

History
- First air date: 1986
- Call sign meaning: QXFM Branding

Technical information
- Licensing authority: FCC
- Facility ID: 62040
- Class: A
- ERP: 340 watts
- HAAT: 158 meters

Links
- Public license information: Public file; LMS
- Website: wearepurecountry.com

KYQX (89.3 FM) is a community radio station licensed to Weatherford, Texas. The station serves the area around Weatherford, Mineral Wells, and the western DFW metro area. KYQX airs a classic country format calling itself "Pure Country". KYQX is also rebroadcast on 89.5 KEQX from Stephenville TX which originally played the music. Until mid 2017 KYQX broadcast on 89.5 FM, before it reduced power and changed frequencies to make way for KEQX's upgrade. The station is one of the three stations in the QXFM group of stations. The others are KMQX, and KEQX.
