= XHNAL-FM =

Radio station in Tonalá, Chiapas, Mexico

- Tonalá, Chiapas; Mexico
- Broadcast area: Tonalá, Chiapas
- Frequency: 89.5 FM
- Branding: Digital 89

Programming
- Format: Public radio

Ownership
- Owner: Government of the State of Chiapas

History
- First air date: December 3, 1994
- Call sign meaning: ToNALá

Technical information
- ERP: 97 kW
- Transmitter coordinates: 16°06′48″N 93°46′53″W

Links
- Webcast: Listen live
- Website: radiotvycine.chiapas.gob.mx

XHNAL-FM is a radio station on 89.5 FM in Tonalá, Chiapas, Mexico. It is part of the state-owned Radio Chiapas state network and is known as Digital 89.

XHNAL was established in 1994 and is the most powerful radio station in Chiapas.
