= XHUCT-FM =

Radio station of the Universidad Autónoma de Coahuila in Torreón

- Torreón, Coahuila, Mexico; Mexico
- Broadcast area: Comarca Lagunera
- Frequency: 89.5 MHz
- Branding: Radio Universidad

Programming
- Format: University radio

Ownership
- Owner: Universidad Autónoma de Coahuila
- Sister stations: XHUACS-FM

History
- First air date: March 7, 2013
- Call sign meaning: Universidad Autónoma de Coahuila/Torreón

Technical information
- ERP: 3 kW

Links
- Webcast: mixlr.com/xhuct-895fm/
- Website: www.facebook.com/XHUCT89.5FM

XHUCT-FM is a radio station serving Torreón, Coahuila owned by the Universidad Autónoma de Coahuila. It is branded as Radio Universidad and broadcasts on 89.5 FM from its campus.

The station came to air on March 7, 2013.

It shares programming with XHUACS-FM 104.1 in Saltillo, which is the other radio station operated by the university.
