= DXME =

Radio station in Koronadal, Philippines

Love Radio Koronadal (DXME)
- Koronadal; Philippines
- Broadcast area: Northern South Cotabato and surrounding areas
- Frequency: 100.1 MHz
- Branding: 100.1 Love Radio

Programming
- Languages: Hiligaynon, Filipino
- Format: Contemporary MOR, OPM
- Network: Love Radio

Ownership
- Owner: MBC Media Group

History
- First air date: January 3, 2011

Technical information
- Licensing authority: NTC
- Power: 5,000 watts
- ERP: 10,500 watts

Links
- Webcast: Listen Love
- Website: Love Radio Koronadal

DXME (100.1 FM), broadcasting as 100.1 Love Radio, is a radio station owned and operated by MBC Media Group. The station's studio and transmitter are located at the 3rd Floor, Velarde Bldg., General Santos Dr., Koronadal.
