= WJPP-LP =

- Palm City, Florida; United States
- Frequency: 100.1 MHz

Ownership
- Owner: Prince of Peace Communications, Inc.

Technical information
- Licensing authority: FCC
- Facility ID: 134533
- Class: L1
- ERP: 100 watts
- HAAT: 29.5 meters (97 ft)
- Transmitter coordinates: 27°13′16.37″N 80°15′49.37″W

Links
- Public license information: LMS
- Webcast: Listen Live
- Website: wjppfm.com

WJPP-LP (100.1 FM) is a radio station licensed to Palm City, Florida, United States. The station is currently owned by Prince of Peace Communications, Inc.
