= KNRB =

Radio station in Atlanta, Texas

- Atlanta, Texas; United States
- Broadcast area: Texarkana area
- Frequency: 100.1 MHz

Programming
- Format: Christian

Ownership
- Owner: Family Worship Center Church, Inc.

History
- First air date: 1978
- Former call signs: KLUK (CP); KPYN (1978–2000)

Technical information
- Licensing authority: FCC
- Facility ID: 2765
- Class: C2
- ERP: 50,000 watts
- HAAT: 150 meters (490 ft)
- Transmitter coordinates: 33°15′18.00″N 94°5′16.00″W

Links
- Public license information: Public file; LMS
- Website: sonlifetv.com

KNRB (100.1 FM) is a radio station broadcasting a Christian format. Licensed to Atlanta, Texas, United States, it serves the Texarkana area. The station is owned by Family Worship Center Church, Inc.
