= KTEC =

- Klamath Falls, Oregon; United States
- Broadcast area: Klamath Basin
- Frequency: 89.5 MHz

Programming
- Format: College radio
- Affiliations: Oregon Institute of Technology

Ownership
- Owner: Oregon State Board of Higher Education

History
- First air date: 1950 (at 88.1)
- Former frequencies: 88.1 MHz (1950–1982)
- Call sign meaning: Reminiscent of Oregon "Tech"

Technical information
- Licensing authority: FCC
- Facility ID: 62398
- Class: A
- ERP: 210 watts
- HAAT: 56 meters
- Transmitter coordinates: 42°12′59″N 121°47′57″W

Links
- Public license information: Public file; LMS
- Webcast: Listen live
- Website: ktec895.com

KTEC (89.5 FM) is a radio station licensed to Klamath Falls, Oregon, United States. The station is owned by the Oregon State Board of Higher Education, and is broadcast from the campus of the Oregon Institute of Technology from the College Union. The station broadcasts 24 hours a day, with DJs from Oregon Institute of Technology and the nearby Klamath Falls community hosting shows every day.
