= KMFA =

Classical music radio station in Austin, Texas

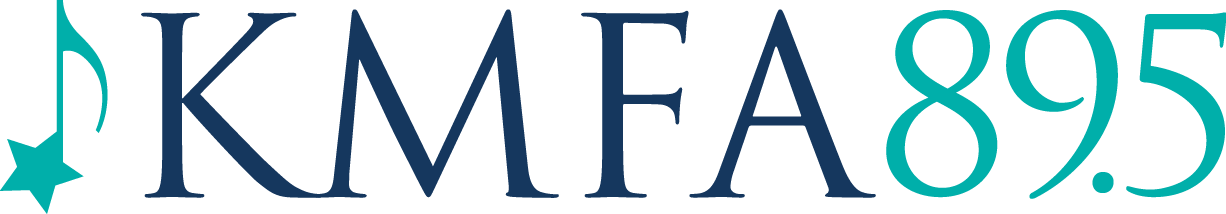

Austin, Texas; United States
- Broadcast area: Austin metropolitan area
- Frequency: 89.5 MHz
- Branding: KMFA Classical 89.5

Programming
- Format: Classical
- Affiliations: National Public Radio

Ownership
- Owner: Capitol Broadcasting Association, Inc

History
- First air date: January 29, 1967
- Call sign meaning: Klassical Music For Austin

Technical information
- Licensing authority: FCC
- Facility ID: 8685
- Class: C1
- ERP: 40,000 watts
- HAAT: 398 meters (1,306 ft)
- Transmitter coordinates: 30.323°N 97.800°W

Links
- Public license information: Public file; LMS
- Webcast: Listen live
- Website: www.kmfa.org

KMFA (89.5 MHz) is a non-commercial, listener-supported, radio station in Austin, Texas. It airs a classical music format and is owned by Capitol Broadcasting Association, Inc. The studios and offices are on Navasota Street in Austin.

KMFA is a Class C1 station. It has an effective radiated power (ERP) of 40,000 watts. The transmitter is off Toro Canyon Road in the West Austin Antenna Farm. KMFA is licensed to broadcast a digital hybrid HD Radio signal.

== Programming ==
The broadcast schedule consists of classical music programs with local hosts, as well as nationally syndicated broadcasts. A weekly program is provided by the School of Music at the University of Texas-Austin and from the Austin Symphony Orchestra.

Weekly national shows from NPR and other public radio networks include the Metropolitan Opera during its season, the Chicago Symphony Orchestra, the Chamber Music Society of Lincoln Center and "Performance Today". Also heard are "From the Top" showcasing young classical musicians, "Pipedreams" featuring pipe organ performances and "Sunday Baroque".

== History ==
In the mid-1960s, Austin lost its commercial FM classical music station. A group of listeners wanted to keep fine arts programming on the air in the capital of Texas. They formed a group to seek a non-commercial radio license. Noyes Willett was the unpaid chief engineer who helped get the station built. Leonard Masters was KMFA's first announcer and program director. Studios were set up in the Perry Brooks Building.

The station signed on the air on January 29, 1967. Masters was at the controls when KMFA began. The first piece of music was the rousing "William Tell Overture" composed by Gioachino Rossini. At first, KMFA was only powered at 1,300 watts, a fraction of its current output.

In 2020, KMFA completed construction on a state-of-the-art permanent facility in East Austin, funded entirely by community gifts. The total price tag was $10.5 Million. The complex includes the 130-seat "Draylen Mason Music Studio", as well as on-air and production booths, an interactive educational gallery, and public gathering spaces. Live concerts and broadcasts are regularly held there, along with social events and youth camps.

== Hosts ==
- Emilio Alvarez
- Jeffrey Blair
- Guillermo Delgado
- Dianne Donovan
- Ryan Kelly
- Judlyne Lilly-Gibson
- Carla McElhaney
- Anton Nel
- Sara Schneider
