= KKLY =

K-Love radio station in El Paso, Texas

- El Paso, Texas; United States
- Broadcast area: El Paso metropolitan area
- Frequency: 89.5 MHz (HD Radio)

Programming
- Format: Contemporary Christian music
- Subchannels: HD2: Air1; HD3: Radio Nueva Vida
- Network: K-Love

Ownership
- Owner: Educational Media Foundation

History
- First air date: May 1985
- Former call signs: KXCR (1985–2006)

Technical information
- Licensing authority: FCC
- Facility ID: 19786
- Class: C2
- ERP: 3,500 watts
- HAAT: 369 m (1,211 ft)
- Transmitter coordinates: 31°47′42.4″N 106°28′53″W
- Translator: 102.7 K274BL (Anthony)

Links
- Public license information: Public file; LMS
- Webcast: Listen live HD2: Listen live
- Website: www.klove.com HD2: www.air1.com HD3: nuevavida.com

KKLY (89.5 FM) is a radio station in El Paso, Texas, United States. It is owned and operated by the Educational Media Foundation as a transmitter in its K-Love network, airing contemporary Christian music.

Prior to being sold to EMF, the station was KXCR, a public, bilingual jazz music radio station, between 1985 and 2002.

== History ==
On October 19, 1983, the Federal Communications Commission granted a construction permit to ETCOM (Empowerment Through Communication) for a new, 126-watt noncommercial radio station on 89.5 MHz in El Paso. ETCOM had been seeking a bilingual radio station for El Paso since 1976, when it was founded by the Metropolitan Board of Missions, and had already produced public radio programming for NPR, including feature capsules and a radio drama on the life of Sor Juana Inés de la Cruz.

The new station went on the air in May 1985 as KXCR, a station with an emphasis on local and community programs, mostly in English but with some output in Spanish. The young station was chosen to house the Latin American News Service, a Corporation for Public Broadcasting-supported news agency providing bilingual reporting on Latin America to as many as 77 public radio stations. The news service closed in 1989 due to a failure to secure funding sources beyond the CPB.

By 1989, KXCR's primary musical format was jazz. The station was struggling for funding in a rare market with two separate public radio operations and had nearly gone off the air in 1988. The jazz and world music programming was supplemented by additional spoken-word fare, such as the public radio program The World, in 1996. It added alternative music at night in 1998, seeking to reach a youth audience. Beginning in April 1995, one particularly unusual feature produced at KXCR—distributed to 185 stations in the United States and beyond—was Universo, the Spanish-language version of StarDate. (KXCR itself did not air the program, which station executives believed to be the only syndicated radio program originating from El Paso.)

In April 2002, KXCR ceased to air most of its programming, with the temporary exception of its youth shows, and was leased out to the Educational Media Foundation, which immediately began airing K-Love. EMF closed on the $1 million purchase of the station in January 2003. The studios were purchased by the Self Reliance Border Media Project after the EMF takeover.
