= WFLQ =

- French Lick, Indiana; United States
- Broadcast area: Bedford, Indiana; Jasper, Indiana
- Frequency: 100.1 MHz
- Branding: Q 100

Programming
- Format: Country music

Ownership
- Owner: Willtronics Broadcasting

Technical information
- Licensing authority: FCC
- Facility ID: 72842
- Class: A
- ERP: 6,000 watts
- HAAT: 91 meters (299 ft)
- Transmitter coordinates: type:city 38°35′41.00″N 86°36′48.00″W

Links
- Public license information: Public file; LMS
- Website: wflq.com

WFLQ (100.1 FM) is a radio station broadcasting a country music format. Licensed to French Lick, Indiana, the station is owned by Willtronics Broadcasting.

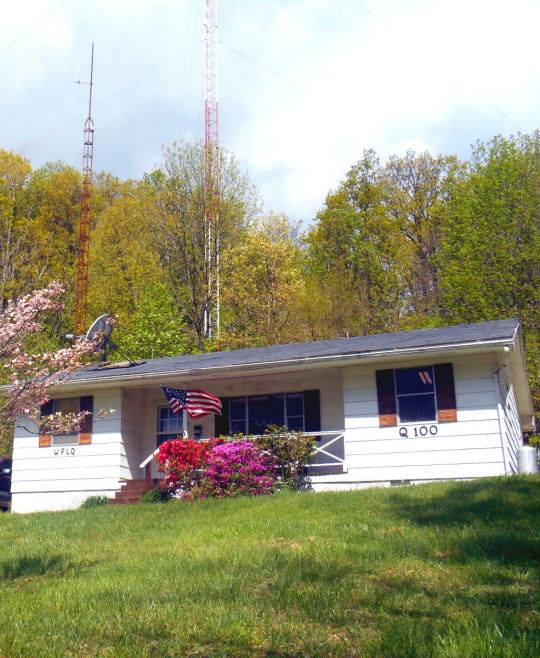
WFLQ French Lick Indiana

WFLQ-FM, Q-100, signed on at 12:55 pm on April 12, 1983, with Satellite Music Network's Country Coast-To-Coast. Q-100 broadcasts on 100.1Mhz with 6,000 watts of modern country, hourly national news and local news six times a day. As of 2015 Q-100 broadcasts Westwood One's Country Format with Westwood One news on the hour. Also broadcast is Springs Valley High School football, basketball, baseball and volleyball games. Three times a week "Tradio" is heard on Mondays, Wednesdays and Fridays with host Tradio Joe. On Sunday mornings, the popular broadcast "Sunday Morning Gospel Show" with Randall Hamm is heard from 8 am – noon. The program is one of the first programs that began on Q-100, that is still heard today. The host Randall Hamm has deejayed the program since 1995 and was nominated as a Top 10 Small Market DJ, 2012–2015, by the Singing News, the nation's leading gospel Christian magazine. WFLQ has won Station of the year, in 2020 and 2021, in the Gospel Fan Awards, presented by Christian Voice Magazine. Hamm has also won DJ Of The Year Fan Award, in 2020, as part of the Fan Awards. WFLQ is also home to IU Football and Basketball broadcasts in season.
