= CHLP-FM =

Radio station in Listowel, Ontario

- Listowel, Ontario; Canada
- Frequency: 100.1 MHz

Programming
- Format: country music

Ownership
- Owner: Five Amigos Broadcasting Inc. Corporation

History
- First air date: September 15, 2020

Technical information
- Class: B1
- ERP: 4,900 watts (maximum ERP of 8,000 watts)

Links
- Website: theranch100.com

CHLP-FM is a Canadian radio station which broadcasts a country music format on the frequency of 100.1 MHz FM in Listowel, Ontario. The station is branded as The Ranch.

== History ==
On April 25, 2019, Five Amigos Broadcasting Inc. received an approval from the CRTC to operate a new FM radio station at Listowel on 100.1 MHz with 4,900 watts (maximum ERP of 8,000 watts with an effective height of the antenna above average terrain of 83 metres).

On September 15, 2020, the station officially launched as Perth County's Hottest Country - 100.1 The Ranch.

The callsign CHLP was used at a former radio station in Montreal from the 1930s to the 1950s, as well as a BCTV reboradcaster in McLure, British Columbia. It is unknown if the callsign was used at another radio or television station until its current use in Listowel in 2020.
