= XHSN-FM =

Radio station in Nogales, Sonora, Mexico

- Nogales, Sonora; Mexico
- Frequency: 106.7 MHz
- Branding: La Numero Uno

Programming
- Format: Regional Mexican

Ownership
- Owner: Grupo Radiorama; (XHSN-FM, S.A. de C.V.)
- Operator: Grupo Bura Multimedia

History
- First air date: October 28, 1994 (concession)
- Call sign meaning: Sonora Nogales

Technical information
- Licensing authority: CRT
- Class: B1
- ERP: 19.51 kW
- HAAT: 32.5 m (107 ft)

Links
- Webcast: Listen live
- Website: losnumerouno.com

XHSN-FM is a radio station on 106.7 FM in Nogales, Sonora, Mexico. The station is owned by Grupo Radiorama but operated by Bura Multimedia as La Numero Uno with an Regional Mexican format.

== History ==
XHSN received its concession on October 28, 1994. It was owned by Radiorama, carrying the Sonido Crystal with a Regional Mexican format until flipped to Los 40 Principales franchise in 2005. In early 2012, all Radiorama stations in Nogales was leased to Grupo Larsa Comunicaciones when shed many of its stations in Sonora, converted to Sin Límites retaining a pop format.

In September 2019, XHSN flipped to romantic as Romántica under new ISA management. This station reverted to Radiorama control, until January 1, 2022 to make way for an English and Spanish classic hits as Studio 106.7.

On September 1, 2025, XHSN and XHESO-FM in Ciudad Obregón leased to Bura Multimedia management based in Hermosillo, resulting the Studio format moved to XHHN-FM 89.9.
