= Jimmy Swaggart Ministries =

American evangelical ministry

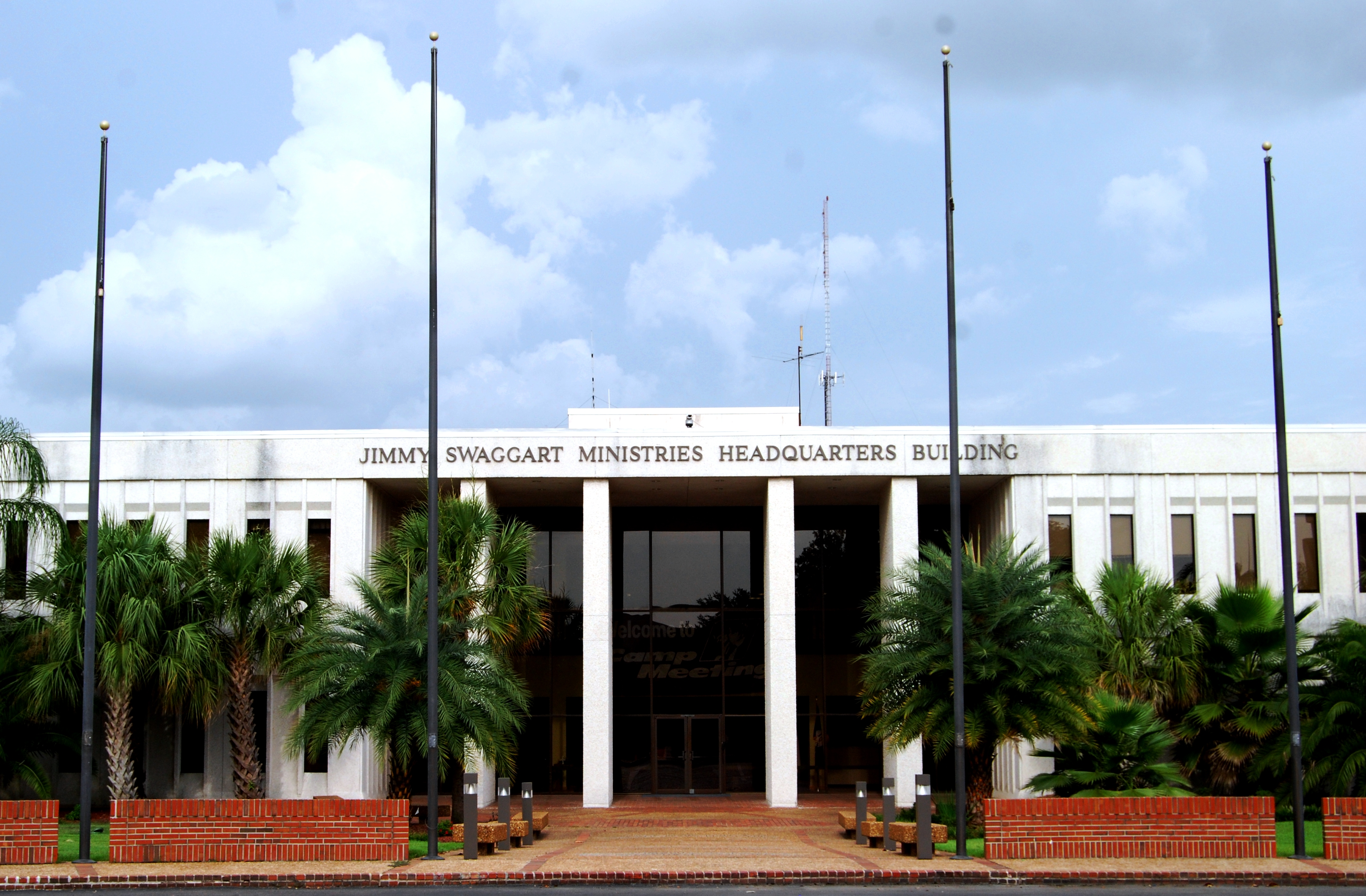
- Headquarters in Baton Rouge, Louisiana
- Formation: 1984
- Founder: Jimmy Swaggart
- Purpose: Evangelical Ministry
- Headquarters: Baton Rouge, Louisiana, United States
- Leader: Gabriel Swaggart
- Subsidiaries: SonLife Broadcasting Network; Jimmy Swaggart Bible College; Family Worship Center; WJFM
- Website: https://www.jsm.org/

Jimmy Swaggart Ministries is an evangelical Christian organization based in Baton Rouge, Louisiana, founded in 1984 by televangelist Jimmy Swaggart. It oversees entities such as Jimmy Swaggart Bible College and Family Worship Center. The latter, now led by his son Donnie and grandson Gabriel, functions as a megachurch. The ministry also maintains an international outreach.

== History ==
Following a highly publicized sex scandal, Jimmy Swaggart was stripped of his Assemblies of God ministerial credentials and continued as an independent, non-denominational minister. He subsequently established Jimmy Swaggart Ministries as the administrative organization for his church, radio station (WJFM), and television programs.

== Jimmy Swaggart Bible College ==
Jimmy Swaggart Bible College
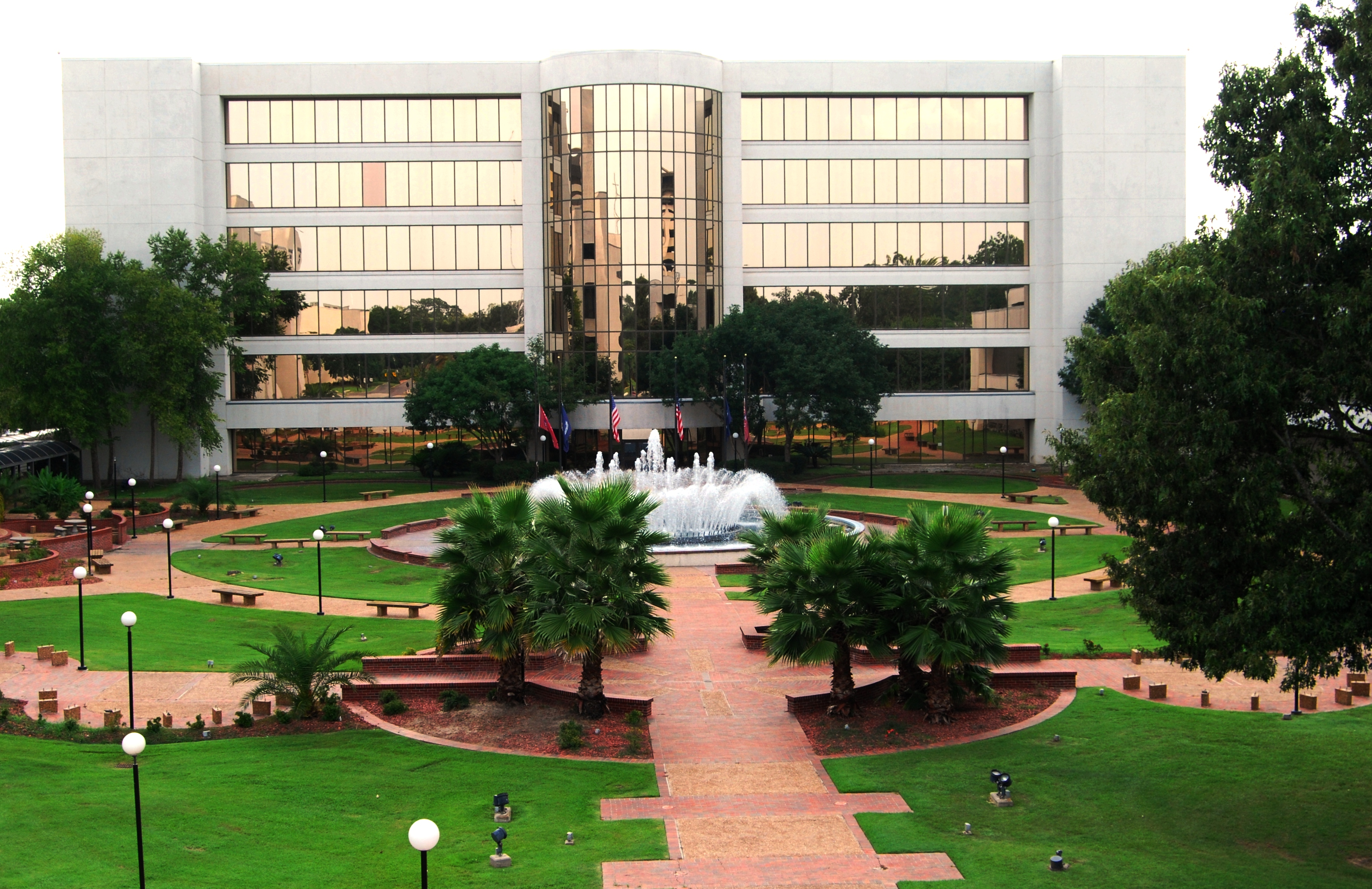

Location
- 7320 Bluebonnet Blvd. Baton Rouge, Louisiana 70810; United States; 30°23′6.2″N 91°5′44.7″W

Information
- Other name: World Evangelism Bible College
- Type: Private Christian
- Religious affiliation: Christian
- Established: 1984 (42 years ago)
- Founder: Jimmy Swaggart
- President: Gabriel Swaggart
- Faculty: 10
- Enrollment: 370 (1991)
- Student to teacher ratio: 37:1
- Campus: 100 acres (400,000 m^{2})
- Revenue: $150 million (1987)
- Website: www.jsbc.edu

Jimmy Swaggart Bible College, located on Bluebonnet Boulevard in Baton Rouge, once reached a peak enrollment of approximately 1,451 students. Enrollment then declined by approximately 72% following the 1988 sex scandal involving Jimmy Swaggart. In response, the institution was renamed World Evangelism Bible College ["WEBC"] in 1991.

1986 to 1988 Ray Trask, served as the president of Jimmy Swaggart Bible College.

In September of 1991 Bernard Rossier resigned as President of Jimmy Swaggart's World Evangelism Bible College and Seminary. During this time enrollment had fallen so sharply that classes were relocated to facilities originally used for the ministry's high school program. The college remains operational today, maintaining a seminary on campus and offering degrees primarily in ministry, though current enrollment figures are unavailable.

== 2024 to 2025 ==
Jimmy Swaggart Bible College ["JSBC"] underwent a major two-year campus renovation (starting around 2024–2025) described by leadership as a "rebirth". While temporarily suspending its online program to pursue, the institution remains open, focusing on on-campus, Spirit-filled, Pentecostal education. The college isn't accredited as of Spring 2026.

According to research by Ministry Watch, JSBC, has revenue of less than $900,000. However, it pays its president, Dr. Gabriel Swaggart, [grandson of Jimmy Swaggart] more than $1 million per year.

== Family Worship Center ==
Family Worship Center, the flagship church of Jimmy Swaggart Ministries, was originally established by Swaggart in the late 1960s as an Assemblies of God congregation. Since the 2010s, leadership transferred to his son Donnie and grandson Gabriel. The church is considered a megachurch.
