= WVDS =

- Petersburg, West Virginia; United States
- Broadcast area: Potomac Highlands of West Virginia; Western Maryland
- Frequency: 89.5 MHz
- Branding: West Virginia Public Broadcasting

Programming
- Format: Public radio
- Affiliations: American Public Media; National Public Radio; Public Radio International

Ownership
- Owner: West Virginia Educational Broadcasting Authority
- Sister stations: WVBL, WVBY, WVEP, WVNP, WVPG, WVPM, WVPB, WVPW, WVWS, WVWV

History
- First air date: 1997
- Former call signs: WAUA (1997–2014)
- Call sign meaning: West Virginia Dolly Sods

Technical information
- Licensing authority: FCC
- Facility ID: 71659
- Class: B
- ERP: 10,000 watts
- HAAT: 319.9 meters (1,050 ft)
- Transmitter coordinates: 39°11′5.80″N 79°18′15.30″W

Links
- Public license information: Public file; LMS
- Webcast: WVDS Webstream
- Website: WVDS Online

WVDS is a public radio formatted broadcast radio station licensed to Petersburg, West Virginia, serving the Potomac Highlands of West Virginia and Western Maryland. WVDS is owned and operated by West Virginia Educational Broadcasting Authority.
