= XHARZ-FM =

Radio station in Aguascalientes, Aguascalientes, Mexico

XHARZ
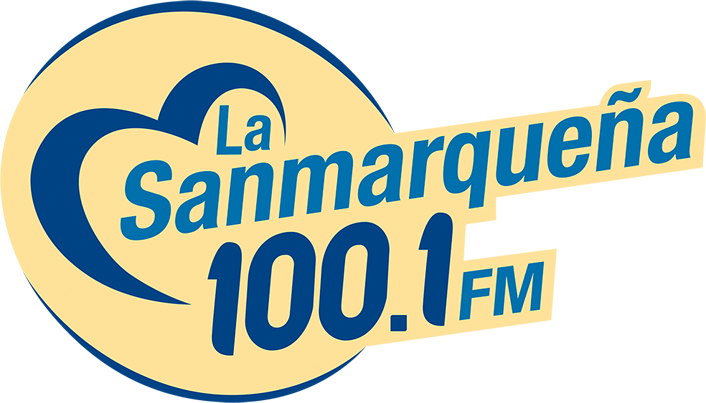
- Aguascalientes, Aguascalientes; Mexico
- Frequency: 100.1 MHz
- Branding: La Sanmarqueña

Programming
- Format: Spanish adult contemporary, ranchera and bolero music

Ownership
- Owner: Grupo Radiofónico ZER; (Arnoldo Rodríguez Zermeño)

History
- First air date: August 30, 1999 (permit)
- Call sign meaning: Arnoldo Rodríguez Zermeño (owner of the station)

Technical information
- Licensing authority: CRT
- Class: B1
- ERP: 15 kW
- HAAT: 80.2 meters (263 ft)
- Transmitter coordinates: 21°52′45″N 102°17′05″W

Links
- Website: grupozer.mx/

XHARZ-FM is a noncommercial radio station in Aguascalientes, Aguascalientes. Broadcasting on 100.1 FM, it is owned by Grupo Radiofónico Zer and known as La Sanmarqueña, which offers a Spanish adult contemporary, ranchera and bolero music format.
