= WCLQ =

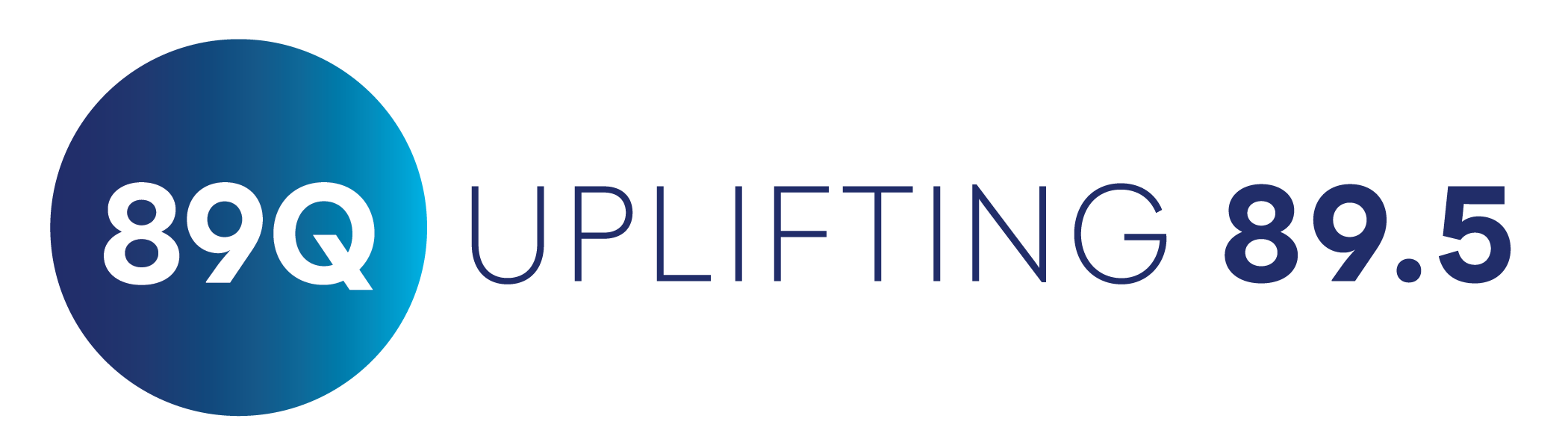
- Wausau, Wisconsin; United States
- Frequency: 89.5 MHz
- Branding: 89Q (pronounced "Eighty-Nine Q")

Programming
- Language: English
- Format: Christian contemporary hit radio

Ownership
- Owner: Christian Life Communications, Inc.

History
- Call sign meaning: Christian Life Communications

Technical information
- Licensing authority: FCC
- Facility ID: 11060
- Class: C1
- ERP: 90,000 watts
- HAAT: 185.0 meters (607.0 ft)
- Transmitter coordinates: 44°55′11.00″N 89°40′45.00″W

Links
- Public license information: Public file; LMS
- Webcast: Listen Live
- Website: 89q.org

WCLQ (89.5 FM) is a radio station licensed to Wausau, Wisconsin, United States, and airs a Christian contemporary hit radio format. The station is owned by Christian Life Communications, Inc.
