= WRPK-LP =

- Kilmarnock, Virginia; United States
- Broadcast area: Kilmarnock, Virginia; Irvington, Virginia; White Stone, Virginia
- Frequency: 100.1 MHz

Programming
- Format: Variety

Ownership
- Owner: Watershed Radio Project, Incorporated

History
- First air date: 2017; 9 years ago

Technical information
- Licensing authority: FCC
- Facility ID: 197263
- Class: L1
- Power: 73 Watts
- HAAT: 19.8 meters (65 ft)
- Transmitter coordinates: 37°39′58.40″N 76°22′53.80″W

Links
- Public license information: LMS

WRPK-LP is a Variety formatted broadcast radio station. The station is licensed to Kilmarnock, Virginia and serving Kilmarnock, Irvington, and White Stone in Virginia. WRPK-LP is owned and operated by Watershed Radio Project, Incorporated.
