= WQXB =

- Grenada, Mississippi; United States
- Frequency: 100.1 MHz
- Branding: B 100

Programming
- Format: Country

Ownership
- Owner: Tammy Loden Evans (see History section); (Rayanna Group LLC)

History
- First air date: November 24, 1970 (first license granted)
- Former call signs: WRIL (1970–1978)

Technical information
- Licensing authority: FCC
- Facility ID: 10672
- Class: C2
- ERP: 48 kilowatts
- HAAT: 153.3 metres (503 ft)
- Transmitter coordinates: 33°51′24.4″N 89°55′15.3″W

Links
- Public license information: Public file; LMS

WQXB is an FM radio station licensed to the city of Grenada, Mississippi. It has a country format known as "B 100".

The station is owned by Tammy Evans, through licensee Rayanna Group LLC.

WQXB is a member of The Holmes Football Radio Network.

== Ownership history ==
Effective February 1, 2014, WQXB was transferred from Chatterbox, Inc. to The Rayanna Corp. for no consideration in an intra-family deal.
