= WBXB =

- Edenton, North Carolina; United States
- Broadcast area: Elizabeth City, Windsor, Ahoskie, and Murfreesboro.
- Frequency: 100.1 MHz
- Branding: Love 100.1

Programming
- Format: Urban gospel

Ownership
- Owner: Friendship Cathedral Family Worship Center, Inc.

Technical information
- Licensing authority: FCC
- Facility ID: 18649
- Class: C2
- ERP: 50,000 watts
- HAAT: 92 meters
- Transmitter coordinates: 36°07′11″N 76°35′29″W

Links
- Public license information: Public file; LMS
- Website: wbxbfm.net

WBXB (100.1 FM Love 100.1) is a radio station broadcasting an urban gospel format. Licensed to Edenton, North Carolina, United States, it serves the Elizabeth City, Ahoskie, Windsor and Murfreesboro areas. The station is currently owned by Friendship Cathedral Family Worship Center, Inc.

Previous logo
