= WVBI (FM) =

- St. James, Michigan; United States
- Broadcast area: Beaver Island, Michigan
- Frequency: 91.9 MHz
- Branding: "WVBI" and "The Voice of Beaver Island"

Programming
- Format: Community radio
- Affiliations: Deutsche Welle; Public Radio Exchange; WFMT Radio Network; WNYC Studios

Ownership
- Owner: Beaver Island Community Center

History
- First air date: June 2015
- Former call signs: WVBI-LP (2015-2025)
- Former frequencies: 100.1 MHz
- Call sign meaning: "Voice of Beaver Island"

Technical information
- Licensing authority: FCC
- Facility ID: 767049
- Class: A
- ERP: 3,000 watts
- HAAT: 47.2 meters (155 ft)
- Transmitter coordinates: 45°41′11.00″N 85°31′38.30″W

Links
- Public license information: Public file; LMS
- Website: wvbi.biccenter.org

WVBI is a community radio station licensed to St. James, Michigan, and serving Beaver Island in Michigan. WVBI is owned and operated by the Beaver Island Community Center.

== History ==
=== WVBI-LP ===
The first station was WVBI-LP, which was licensed to Beaver Island, Michigan, from 2015 to 2025. When WVBI was granted, the license for WVBI-LP was surrendered.
