= KRCI =

Radio station in Pinetop-Lakeside, Arizona

Coordinates: 34°12′22″N 109°58′34″W

- Pinetop-Lakeside, Arizona; United States
- Broadcast area: Show Low, Arizona
- Frequency: 89.5 MHz

Programming
- Format: Christian radio

Ownership
- Owner: Truth and Life Ministries

Technical information
- Licensing authority: FCC
- Facility ID: 122119
- Class: C3
- ERP: 1,000 watts
- HAAT: 343.0 meters (1,125.3 ft)

Links
- Public license information: Public file; LMS
- Website: krciradio.com

KRCI (89.5 FM) is a radio station licensed to Pinetop-Lakeside, Arizona. The station broadcasts a Christian format and is owned by Truth and Life Ministries.
