= KMOC =

Christian music radio station in Wichita Falls, Texas

- Wichita Falls, Texas; United States
- Broadcast area: Wichita Falls
- Frequency: 89.5 MHz

Programming
- Format: Christian

Ownership
- Owner: Christian Service Foundation, Inc.

History
- First air date: July 7, 1987
- Call sign meaning: Message of Christ

Technical information
- Licensing authority: FCC
- Facility ID: 11107
- Class: C3
- ERP: 3,000 watts
- HAAT: 207.0 meters
- Transmitter coordinates: 33°54′4.00″N 98°32′21.00″W

Links
- Public license information: Public file; LMS
- Website: kmocfm.com

KMOC, The Message of Christ is a Christian radio station located in Wichita Falls, Texas and broadcasts at 89.5 FM. The station was created by the Christian Service Foundation and began broadcasting on July 7, 1987. The station began with a single microphone, an old phonograph, and donated/borrowed equipment. The station now operates with 4 full-time staff members and 4 part-time audio engineers in a custom designed studio. KMOC-FM is a Class C3 non-commercial station with a transmitter of 3000 watts and is sponsored by business underwriters.
