= KHWG-FM =

- Crystal, Nevada; United States
- Frequency: 100.1 MHz
- Branding: 100.1 FM Classic Country

Programming
- Format: Classic country

Ownership
- Owner: Keily Miller; (President of the Liberty Church of Nevada and His Successors, A Corporation Sole)

History
- First air date: 2009

Technical information
- Licensing authority: FCC
- Facility ID: 165946
- Class: C3
- ERP: 1,800 watts (horizontal)
- HAAT: 232 meters (761 ft)
- Transmitter coordinates: 36°27′45″N 116°03′33″W

Links
- Public license information: Public file; LMS
- Website: khwgradio.com

KHWG-FM (100.1 FM) is a commercial radio station licensed to Crystal, Nevada, United States. Owned by Keily Miller, it broadcasts a classic country format.
