= Valley FM 89.5 Tuggeranong =

Community radio station in Wanniassa, Australia

Valley FM (1VFM)
Australia
- Broadcast area: Tuggeranong, ACT
- Frequency: FM: 89.5 MHz

Programming
- Format: Community radio

Ownership
- Owner: Valley FM Broadcasters Association Inc

History
- First air date: 1 May 2000

Technical information
- ERP: 100 watts
- HAAT: -37 m
- Transmitter coordinates: 35°24′7″S 149°5′56″E

Valley FM 89.5 (call sign: 1VFM) is a community radio station which broadcasts on 89.5 MHz from its studios at the Erindale Centre, in the southern Canberra suburb of Wanniassa. All of the station's staff and presenters are volunteers, and the station operates as a completely non-profit entity.

Valley FM 89.5 has been on air since June 1999 and holds a Permanent Community Broadcasting Licence (PCBL). The station is also a full member of the Community Broadcasting Association of Australia (CBAA).

In November 2005, Valley FM 89.5 was named the Best Value For Money Radio Station in Australia at the Australian Community Broadcasting Association (CBAA) awards ceremony held in Fremantle, Western Australia.

More information about Valley FM 89.5 and the latest Program Guide can be found at www.valleyfm.com
