= WXZQ =

- Piketon, Ohio; United States
- Broadcast area: Waverly, Ohio
- Frequency: 100.1 MHz
- Branding: Q100.1

Programming
- Format: Classic hits
- Affiliations: Fox News Radio; Total Media Sports

Ownership
- Owner: Total Media Group Inc.

History
- First air date: 1997

Technical information
- Licensing authority: FCC
- Facility ID: 15920
- Class: A
- ERP: 6,000 watts
- HAAT: 100 meters (330 ft)
- Transmitter coordinates: 39°5′53.00″N 82°57′20.00″W

Links
- Public license information: Public file; LMS
- Webcast: Listen Live
- Website: WXZQ Online}

WXZQ (100.1 FM) is a radio station broadcasting a classic hits format serving Piketon, Ohio and Waverly, Ohio. The station is currently owned by Total Media Group Inc.

In July 2003, the station changed to a contemporary hit radio radio format from the previous adult contemporary format. On September 17, 2024, the station dropped their top 40/CHR radio format, transitioning to conservative talk radio and rebranding themselves as 100.1 WXZQ - The Eagle.

The station also broadcasts Piketon High School Football, and Boys and Girls Basketball.

On February 23, 2026 at 12 noon, WXZQ changed their format from conservative talk to classic hits, branded as "Q100.1".
