= KOKS =

- Poplar Bluff, Missouri; United States
- Frequency: 89.5 MHz
- Branding: King of Kings Christian Radio

Programming
- Format: Christian Radio

Ownership
- Owner: Calvary Educational Broadcasting Network

History
- First air date: October 2, 1988
- Call sign meaning: King Of KingS

Technical information
- Licensing authority: FCC
- Facility ID: 8439
- Class: C1
- ERP: 100,000 watts
- HAAT: 129 meters (423 ft)
- Transmitter coordinates: 36°48′38″N 90°27′50″W

Links
- Public license information: Public file; LMS
- Webcast: Listen Online
- Website: http://www.koksradio.org

KOKS (89.5 FM) is a Christian radio station licensed to Poplar Bluff, Missouri. The station is owned by Calvary Educational Broadcasting Network.

KOKS's programming includes Christian Music and Christian Talk and Teaching programs. Christian Talk and Teaching shows heard on KOKS include; Thru the Bible with J. Vernon McGee, Focus On The Family, and Enjoying Everyday Life with Joyce Meyer.
