= KKSC-LP =

- Silver City, New Mexico; United States
- Frequency: 100.1 MHz
- Branding: The Light

Programming
- Format: Contemporary Christian

Ownership
- Owner: Calvary Chapel of Silver City

Technical information
- Licensing authority: FCC
- Facility ID: 134039
- Class: L1
- ERP: 20 watts
- HAAT: 66.6 meters (219 ft)
- Transmitter coordinates: 32°44′35″N 108°17′38″W

Links
- Public license information: LMS
- Website: KKSC-LP website

KKSC-LP (100.1 FM, The Light) is a radio station broadcasting a Contemporary Christian music format. Licensed to Silver City, New Mexico, United States, the station is currently owned by Calvary Chapel of Silver City.
