= WQMJ =

Forsyth, Georgia; United States
- Broadcast area: Macon area
- Frequency: 100.1 MHz
- Branding: MAJIC 100 FM

Programming
- Format: Urban oldies

Ownership
- Owner: Roberts Communications, Inc.

History
- First air date: 1987-05-22 (as WIBB-FM)
- Former call signs: WIBB-FM (1987–1987); WFXM-FM (1987–2000)
- Call sign meaning: Quality MaJic

Technical information
- Licensing authority: FCC
- Facility ID: 41990
- Class: A
- ERP: 3,000 watts
- HAAT: 299 metres (981 ft)
- Transmitter coordinates: 32°58′27.00″N 83°52′2.00″W

Links
- Public license information: Public file; LMS

WQMJ (100.1 FM) is a radio station broadcasting an urban oldies format. Licensed to Forsyth, Georgia, United States, the station serves the Macon area. The station is currently owned by Roberts Communications, Inc.

== History ==
The station went on the air as WIBB-FM on May 22, 1987. On September 8, 1987, the station changed its call sign to WFXM-FM. On March 20, 2000, it was changed to the current WQMJ.
