= KCTN =

- Garnavillo, Iowa; United States
- Broadcast area: Elkader, Iowa
- Frequency: 100.1 MHz

Programming
- Format: Country

Ownership
- Owner: Design Homes Inc

Technical information
- Licensing authority: FCC
- Class: A
- ERP: 6,000 watts
- HAAT: 100 metres (330 feet)
- Transmitter coordinates: 42°53′6″N 91°19′11″W

Links
- Public license information: Public file; LMS

KCTN (100.1 FM) is a commercial radio station that serves the Elkader, Iowa area. The station primarily broadcasts a country music format. KCTN is licensed to Design Homes, Inc.

The transmitter and broadcast tower are located between Garnavillo and Elkader, near the unincorporated community of Clayton Center. According to the Antenna Structure Registration database, the tower is 76 metres (249 feet) tall with the FM broadcast antenna mounted at the 72 metres (236 feet) level. The calculated Height Above Average Terrain is 100 metres (330 feet).
