= Not-to-exceed =

Pollution emission standard

The not-to-exceed (NTE) standard promulgated by the United States Environmental Protection Agency (EPA) ensures that heavy-duty truck engine emissions are controlled over the full range of speed and load combinations commonly experienced in use. NTE establishes an area (the "NTE zone") under the torque curve of an engine where emissions must not exceed a specified value for any of the regulated pollutants. The NTE test procedure does not involve a specific driving cycle of any specific length (mileage or time). Rather it involves driving of any type that could occur within the bounds of the NTE control area, including operation under steady-state or transient conditions and under varying ambient conditions. Emissions are averaged over a minimum time of thirty seconds and then compared to the applicable NTE emission limits.

== Creation of NTE ==
NTE standards were created by the EPA as a result of a consent decree between the EPA and several major diesel engine manufacturers. These manufacturers included Caterpillar, Cummins, Detroit Diesel, Mack, Mack's parent company Renault Vehicles Industriels, and Volvo Truck Corp. These manufacturers were accused of violating the Clean Air Act by installing devices that defeat emission controls. As part of the resulting consent decree settlement with the EPA, these manufacturers were assessed heavy fines and were subjected to new emissions standards which included NTE.

== Requirements to achieve engine operation in the "NTE zone" ==
When all of the following conditions are simultaneously met for at least 30 seconds, and engine is considered to be operating in the NTE zone.

1. Engine speed must be greater than 15% above idle speed
2. Engine torque must be greater than or equal to 30% of maximum torque.
3. Engine power must be greater than or equal to 30% of maximum power.
4. Vehicle altitude must be less than or equal to 5,500 feet (1,700 m).
5. Ambient temperature must be less than or equal to 100 °F (38 °C) at sea level to 86 °F at 5,500 feet (1,700 m).
6. Brake specific fuel consumption (BSFC) must be less than or equal to 105% of the minimum BSFC if an engine is not coupled to a multi-speed manual or automatic transmission.
7. Engine operation must be outside of any manufacturer petitioned exclusion zone.
8. Engine operation must be outside of any NTE region in which a manufacturer states that less than 5% of in-use time will be spent.
9. For Exhaust gas recirculation (EGR) equipped engines, the intake manifold temperature must be greater than or equal to 86-100 degrees Fahrenheit, depending upon intake manifold pressure.
10. For EGR-equipped engines, the engine coolant temperature must be greater than or equal to 125-140 degrees Fahrenheit, depending on intake manifold pressure.
11. Engine after treatment systems' temperature must be greater than or equal to 250 degrees Celsius.

== Visual representations of NTE zone ==
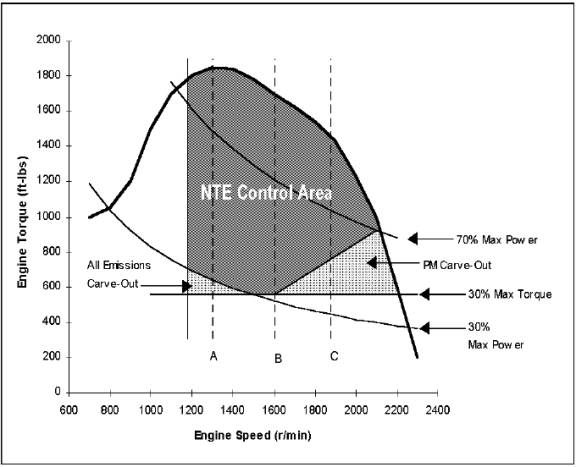
Example NTE Control Area for Heavy-Duty Diesel Engine With 100% Operational Engine Speed Less Than 2400 rpm

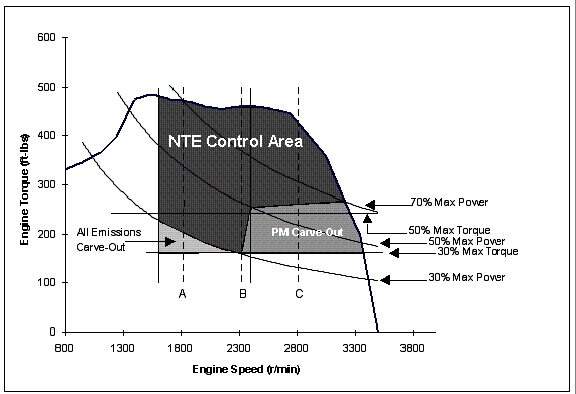
Example NTE Control Area for HeavyDuty Diesel Engine With 100% Operational Engine Speed Greater Than 2400 rpm

=== Description ===
The NTE test, as defined in CFR 86.1370-2007, establishes an area (NTE control area) under the torque curve of an engine where emissions must not exceed a specified emission cap for a given pollutant. The NTE cap is set at 1.25 times the FTP emission limit as described in the subsection above. For 2005 model year heavy-duty engines, the NTE emission cap for NMHC plus NOx is 1.25 times 2.5 grams per brake horsepower-hour, or 3.125 grams per brake horsepower-hour. The basic NTE control area for diesel engines has three basic boundaries on the engine's torque and speed map. The first is the upper boundary that is represented by an engine's maximum torque at a given speed. The second boundary is 30 percent of maximum torque. Only operation above this boundary is included in the NTE control area. The third boundary is determined based on the lowest engine speed at 50 percent of maximum power and highest engine speed at 70 percent of maximum power. This engine speed is considered the "15 percent operational engine speed". The fourth boundary is 30% of maximum power

== Controversy and deficiency regarding NTE standards ==
=== Controversy ===
A controversial issue is the applicability of the NTE limits to the real-world driving. In order for NTE standards to apply, the engine needs to remain within the NTE zone (limits include operation at a minimum of 30% of rated power) for at least 30 seconds. Concerns arose that performing this action could prove to be difficult, as each time the driver removes the foot from the accelerator pedal, or shifts gears on vehicles with manual transmission, the engine leaves the NTE zone.

In urban or suburban driving, this happens relatively often, to the point that NTE standards are applicable only a very small portion of the operation or, in some cases, not at all. The probability of the engine remaining within the NTE zone for over 30 seconds also decreases with the advent of high-power engines. For example, if the power required to maintain a motorcoach or an over-the-road truck at highway cruising speed is somewhere around 150 hp (110 kW), the probability that a 475 hp (354 kW) engine will consistently operate at loads above 30%, without "dips" to lower power levels, can be relatively small.

These concerns were confirmed by studies carried out by West Virginia University (WVU) under the Consent Decrees. WVU found that "remaining for 30 seconds within the NTE zone can be quite difficult. The resulting low NTE availability poses a problem as many measurements within the NTE area have to be rejected along with those from outside the NTE area. The question arises if in this way all real-life emissions are sufficiently 'well reflected' in the NTE test results"

A second issue of concern in the same vein is a case when an engine is compliant within the NTE zone, but exhibits elevated NOx at power levels just outside the NTE zone, or at idle. For reasons such as this the Working Group On Off Cycle Emissions is studying whether an extension of the NTE zone is rational as they ponder if there are spots on the engine map (outside of the NTE zone) that have a significant contribution in real life emissions. Their preliminary findings echo those of WVU as they found that the time of engine operation in the NTE zone is rather low.

=== EPA admitted deficiencies ===
According to the US EPA there are technical limitations of NTE under limited operating conditions which have caused the EPA to "carve-out" (see graphs above) certain portions of the NTE zone to allow for these deficiencies. Excerpts as follows:

NTE zone was defined by a desire to have a homogeneous emissions limit. Carve-outs within that zone exclude certain areas of operation from NTE consideration or limit how much emissions from that operation can contribute to an NTE result, deficiencies allow temporary exceedences of the NTE standards due to technical limitations under limited operating conditions. The idea is not to hold the manufacturer responsible for NTE compliance during modes where the engine is not capable of operating or where it is not technically feasible to meet the NTE standards.

=== Regarding the particulate matter "carve-out" ===
PM-specific region is "carved out" of the NTE control area. The PM specific area of exclusion is generally in the area under the torque curve, where engine speeds are high and engine torque is low, and can vary in shape depending upon several speed-related criteria and calculations detailed in the regulations. Controlling PM in this range of operation presents fundamental technical challenges which we believe can not be overcome in the 2004 time frame. Specifically, the cylinder pressures created under these high speed and low load conditions are often insufficient to prevent lube oil from being ingested into the combustion chamber. High levels of PM emissions are the result. Furthermore, we do not believe that these engines spend a significant portion of their operating time in this limited speed and torque range

== Lawsuits and settlement ==
=== Lawsuits ===
In 2001, five separate lawsuits were filed against the US EPA by the Engine Manufacturers Association (EMA) and several individual trucking industry entities (such as International Truck and Engine Corporation). Each of those lawsuits challenged the legality and technological feasibility of certain engine emission control standards in EPA regulations now referred to as NTE requirements. In their challenge, EMA stated that to determine whether an engine meets a primary emission standard, engines are tested and assessed using a standardized 20-minute emissions laboratory test known as the Federal Test Procedure. The NTE, by contrast, has no specified test procedure and potentially could apply over an almost infinite number of test conditions. This, in the manufacturers' view, made it virtually impossible to ensure total compliance with the NTE—since there is no real or practical way to test an engine under all conceivable conditions—and so made the NTE both unlawful (the CAA authorizes EPA to adopt engine standards AND accompanying test procedures) and technically infeasible.

=== Settlement ===
On June 3, 2003, the parties finalized a settlement of their disputes pertaining to the NTE standards. The parties agreed upon a detailed outline for a future regulation that would require a manufacturer-run heavy-duty in-use NTE testing ("HDIUT") program for diesel-fueled engines and vehicles. One section of the outline stated:

The NTE Threshold will be the NTE standard, including the margins built into the existing regulations, plus additional margin to account for in-use measurement accuracy. This additional margin shall be determined by the measurement processes and methodologies to be developed and approved by EPA/CARB/EMA. This margin will be structured to encourage instrument manufacturers to develop more and more accurate instruments in the future.

== HDIUT and portable emissions measurement systems (PEMS) ==
The ultimate objective of the new HDIUT program is to allow for a significant streamlining of engine certification if a truly robust in-use emissions testing program proves feasible and cost effective. Time-consuming and expensive laboratory assessments of engines could then give way to real-world, real-time emissions assessments that efficiently provides more relevant data.

Basically, the HDIUT is an industry agreed to manufacturer run, in-use, on-road testing program. It builds upon the original NTE standard. It is designed to focus on compliance in the real world, and relies on emissions testing, utilizing portable emissions measurement systems (PEMS) with NOx, HC, CO and PM being the pollutants to be measured. Measurement accuracy margins are being established to account for the emissions measurement variability associated with the PEMS in-use.

== See also ==
- Clean Air Act
- Mobile emission reduction credit (MERC)
- Global Warming Solutions Act of 2006
- Clear Skies Act of 2003
- Air pollution
- Atmospheric dispersion modeling
- Emission standard
- European emission standards
- Criteria air contaminants
- Pollutant Standards Index
- Vehicle emissions control
- National Ambient Air Quality Standards (USA EPA)
- Attribution of recent climate change
- Western Climate Initiative
- Portable emissions measurement system
