= WXMM-LP =

- Galax, Virginia; United States
- Broadcast area: Metro Galax
- Frequency: 100.1 MHz

Programming
- Format: Variety

Ownership
- Owner: Golden West Media

History
- First air date: 2017
- Former call signs: WEXZ-LP (2014–2014); WFOG-LP (2014–2016)

Technical information
- Licensing authority: FCC
- Facility ID: 196365
- Class: L1
- Power: 100 watts
- HAAT: −29 meters (−95 ft)
- Transmitter coordinates: 36°39′54.10″N 80°55′2.50″W

Links
- Public license information: LMS

WXMM-LP is a Variety formatted broadcast radio station. The station is licensed to and serving Galax in Virginia. WXMM-LP is owned and operated by Golden West Media.
