= WLPS-FM =

Radio station in Lumberton, North Carolina

- Lumberton, North Carolina; United States
- Frequency: 89.5 MHz

Programming
- Format: Gospel Music

Ownership
- Owner: Billy Ray Locklear Evangelistic Association
- Sister stations: WTNG-CD

Technical information
- Licensing authority: FCC
- Facility ID: 91947
- Class: A
- ERP: 2,000 watts (vertical); 0 watts (horizontal)
- HAAT: 134 meters (vertical); 0 watts (horizontal)
- Transmitter coordinates: 34°42′02″N 79°06′32″W

Links
- Public license information: Public file; LMS

WLPS-FM (89.5 FM) is a radio station broadcasting a Gospel Music format. WLPS-FM is licensed to Lumberton, North Carolina, United States. The station is currently owned by Billy Ray Locklear Evangelistic Association. The station was issued its callsign on November 23, 2005.

WLPS-FM also runs a TV station on DTV channel 14, WTNG-CD.
