= WNTE (FM) =

- Mansfield, Pennsylvania; United States
- Frequency: 89.5 MHz
- Branding: 89.5 FM

Programming
- Format: College Radio

Ownership
- Owner: Mansfield University of Pennsylvania

History
- Call sign meaning: Northern Tier Education

Technical information
- Licensing authority: FCC
- Facility ID: 39817
- Class: A
- ERP: 115 watts
- HAAT: -85.0 meters
- Transmitter coordinates: 41°48′23.00″N 77°4′25.00″W

Links
- Public license information: Public file; LMS
- Webcast: Listen Live
- Website: Official website

WNTE (89.5 FM) is a student-run radio station licensed to Mansfield, Pennsylvania, United States. The station is owned and operated by Mansfield University of Pennsylvania.

With an effective radiated power of 150 watts, WNTE's signal reaches a 12-mile radius from its central location in Mansfield, though reception in distant and fringe areas depends on the terrain. Staffed by students, the station uses automation software when program slots cannot be covered.

WNTE, which can also be received via the internet, offers deejay and sound services for events on campus and throughout Tioga County.
