= WGRN (FM) =

- Greenville, Illinois; United States
- Frequency: 89.5 MHz
- Branding: WGRN 89.5

Programming
- Format: Contemporary Christian

Ownership
- Owner: Greenville University Educational Broadcasting Foundation, Inc

Technical information
- Licensing authority: FCC
- Facility ID: 25233
- Class: A
- ERP: 300 watts
- HAAT: 62 metres (203 ft)
- Transmitter coordinates: 38°53′43″N 89°24′30″W

Links
- Public license information: Public file; LMS
- Webcast: Listen Live
- Website: Official Website

WGRN (89.5 FM) is a radio station licensed to serve the community of Greenville, Illinois. The station is owned by Greenville University Educational Broadcasting Foundation, Inc, and airs a contemporary Christian format.

The station was assigned the WGRN call letters by the Federal Communications Commission on January 26, 1965.
