= KEQX =

- Stephenville, Texas; United States
- Frequency: 89.5 MHz
- Branding: Pure Country

Programming
- Format: Classic country

Ownership
- Owner: CSSI Non-Profit Educational Broadcasting Corporation

History
- First air date: 2006 (at 89.7)
- Former frequencies: 89.7 MHz (2006–2017)

Technical information
- Licensing authority: FCC
- Facility ID: 89619
- Class: C2
- ERP: 12,000 watts
- HAAT: 152 meters (499 ft)
- Transmitter coordinates: 32°07′20.7″N 97°58′46.1″W

Links
- Public license information: Public file; LMS
- Website: wearepurecountry.com

KEQX (89.5 FM, "Pure Country") is a noncommercial radio station licensed to Stephenville, Texas, United States, broadcasting a classic country music format. The station is currently owned by CSSI Non-Profit Educational Broadcasting Corporation. The station is one of the five stations in the "QXFM" GROUP of North Texas stations, including KMQX, KYQX, KQXB, and KQXE. All the stations are funded by listener contributions, underwriting sponsors, etc. KEQX started out broadcasting the classic Texas-based "Pure Country" format on 89.7 with a directional antenna covering Stephenville, Hico, Dublin, and surrounding areas until mid 2017 with 6000 watts, half the power of the current 89.5 facility. However in mid 2017 the studio shut down and the owners now broadcast the same music remotely from Weatherford, TX. The classic Texan country lives on.
