= KVSJ-FM =

- Tracy, California; United States
- Frequency: 89.5 MHz

Programming
- Format: Public radio

Ownership
- Owner: Peace and Justice Network of San Joaquin County

History
- First air date: August 30, 2010
- Last air date: May 3, 2021
- Former call signs: KYNJ (2010–2017); KBCC (2017–2020)
- Call sign meaning: "Voice of San Joaquin"

Technical information
- Licensing authority: FCC
- Facility ID: 176022
- Class: A
- ERP: 100 watts
- HAAT: −48.5 meters (−159 ft)
- Transmitter coordinates: 37°40′27.6″N 121°29′3.7″W

Links
- Public license information: Public file; LMS

KVSJ-FM was a radio station licensed to the Peace and Justice Network of San Joaquin County broadcasting on 89.5 FM from Tracy, California. It went on the air as KYNJ on August 30, 2010, but later changed its call sign to KBCC on July 31, 2017, and to KVSJ-FM on June 16, 2020.
