= KCHQ (FM) =

Country music radio station in Soda Springs, Idaho

- Soda Springs, Idaho; United States
- Frequency: 100.1 MHz
- Branding: Kitt FM

Programming
- Format: Silent (was country music)

Ownership
- Owner: Ted Austin; (Jackson Hole Media LLC)

History
- Former call signs: KFIS (1981–2001); KFIF (2001–2004); KITT (2004–2017); KQJK (2017–2018)

Technical information
- Licensing authority: FCC
- Facility ID: 17436
- Class: A
- ERP: 3,000 watts
- HAAT: -84 meters
- Transmitter coordinates: 42°38′30″N 111°36′40″W

Links
- Public license information: Public file; LMS

KCHQ (100.1 FM) is a radio station broadcasting a country music format. Licensed to Soda Springs, Idaho, United States, the station is currently owned by Ted Austin, through licensee Jackson Hole Media LLC, and features programming from AP Radio and Jones Radio Network.

== History ==
The station was assigned the call letters KFIS on February 23, 1981. On September 1, 2001, the station changed its call sign to KFIF and on August 3, 2004, to KITT.

In June 2008, the FCC granted KITT permission to upgrade from a Class A station to a Class C2 station, increase its power to 11,000 watts, and relocate the station to Wilson, Wyoming (serving Jackson Hole). The move was part of a complex proceeding (FCC Rule & Order 05-243) in which 42 stations in a five-state area were affected. Following this proceeding, the FCC changed its rules to allow no more than four stations in a single change. The station remains in Soda Springs, Idaho awaiting modifications by other stations in FCC rulemaking 05-243.

On May 29, 2009, the Fifth District Court in Washington County, UT appointed a receiver for US Capital, Incorporated, an investment company in Boulder, Colorado that foreclosed on Legecy Media, the owner of KITT and several other stations.

KITT's call letters were previously used in Las Vegas, Nevada, Pearl City, Hawaii, Parowan, Utah, San Diego, California, and Shreveport, Louisiana.

On September 18, 2014, KITT was sold to Jackson Hole Media LLC for $76,500. The station changed its call sign to KQJK on June 23, 2017, and then to the current KCHQ on December 7, 2018.
