= Jimmy Swaggart =

American television evangelist (1935–2025)

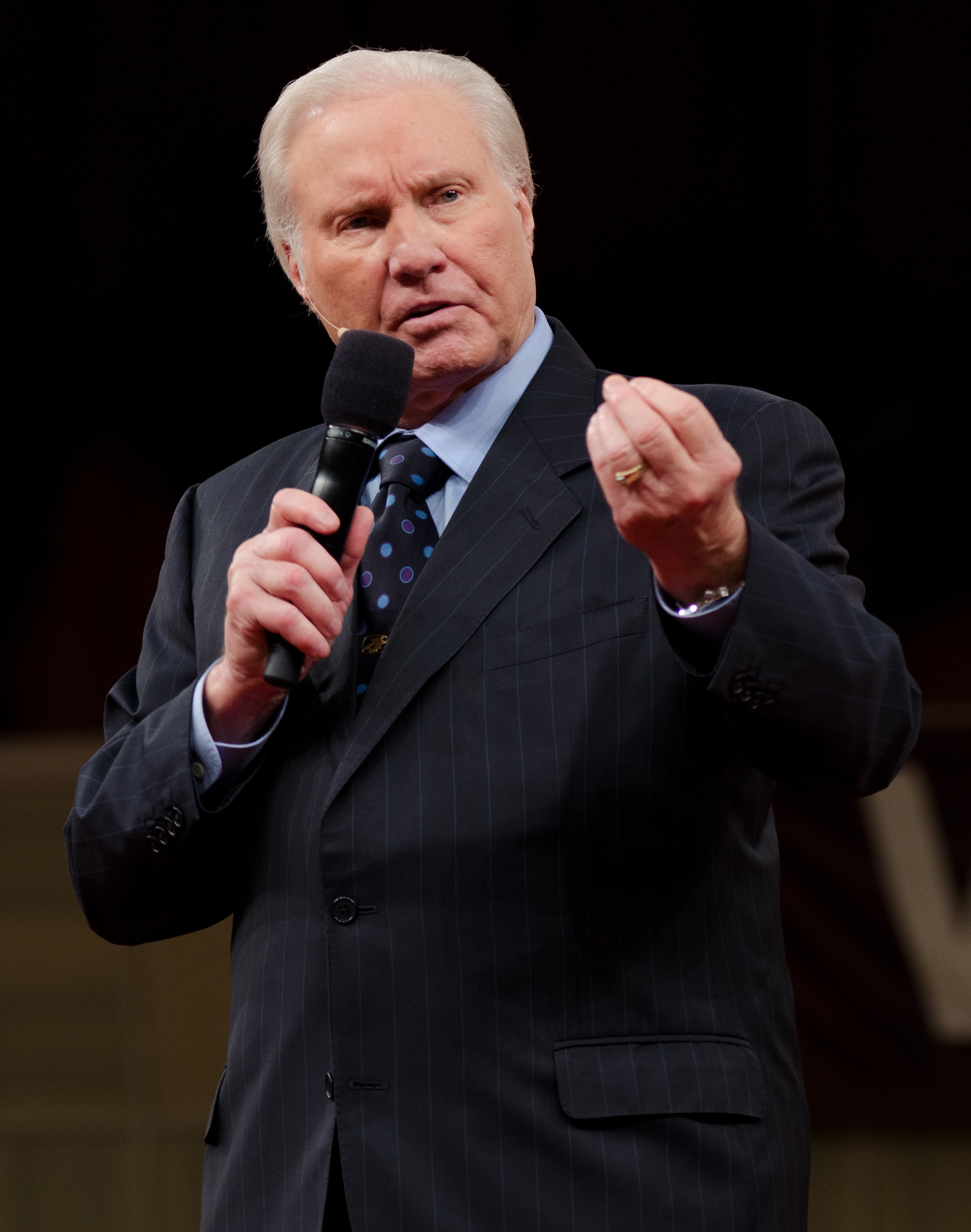
- Swaggart in 2009
- Born: Jimmy Lee Swaggart; March 15, 1935; Ferriday, Louisiana, U.S.
- Died: July 1, 2025 (aged 90); Baton Rouge, Louisiana, U.S.
- Occupations: Televangelist; pastor; author; singer
- Years active: 1955–2025
- Television: The Jimmy Swaggart Telecast (1971–2025); SonLife Broadcasting Network (2007–2025)
- Spouse: Frances Anderson (m. 1952)
- Children: Donnie Swaggart
- Relatives: Mickey Gilley (cousin); Jerry Lee Lewis (cousin)
- Website: jsm.org

Jimmy Lee Swaggart (/ˈswæɡərt/; March 15, 1935 – July 1, 2025) was an American Pentecostal televangelist, pastor, media mogul, author and gospel music artist.

Swaggart was born in Ferriday, Louisiana, into a musically and religiously active family that included cousins Jerry Lee Lewis and Mickey Gilley. Swaggart was ordained as a pastor by the Assemblies of God. He went on to become one of the most well-known televangelists in America. During the 1980s, his crusades were a major part of his ministry—drawing large crowds and receiving significant media attention. Swaggart founded Jimmy Swaggart Ministries, which owns and operates the SonLife Broadcasting Network (SBN). He also founded the Jimmy Swaggart Bible College. Swaggart was the senior pastor of the Family Worship Center in Baton Rouge, Louisiana.

Swaggart was known for scandals involving prostitutes in 1988 and 1991 and revolutionary groups accused of war crimes in southern Africa. One prostitution scandal gave rise to a televised February 21, 1988, speech by Swaggart known as his "I have sinned" speech. After Swaggart was defrocked by the Assemblies of God due to sexual immorality, he moved on to become a non-denominational minister.

Swaggart wrote about 50 Christian books offered. He sold over 15 million records worldwide as a gospel artist and, in 1980, he received a Grammy Award nomination. Married for over 70 years, he raised a ministerial family spanning four generations. Swaggart died in Baton Rouge at age 90, on July 1, 2025.

== Early life ==
Jimmy Lee Swaggart was born on March 15, 1935, in Ferriday, Louisiana. Swaggart was the first of two children born to Willie Leon (known as "Sun" or "Son") Swaggart, a local sharecropper who was a fiddle player and Pentecostal preacher, and Minnie Bell (née Herron), who was a housewife. Swaggart's parents were related by marriage, as Son Swaggart's maternal uncle, Elmo Lewis, was married to Minnie Herron's sister, Mamie. The extended family had a complex network of familial interrelationships; "cousins and in-laws and other relatives married each other until the clan was entwined like a big, tight ball of rubber bands". Swaggart was the cousin of rockabilly pioneer Jerry Lee Lewis and country music star Mickey Gilley.

According to his autobiography To Cross a River, Swaggart, along with his wife and son, lived in poverty during the 1950s as he preached throughout rural Louisiana, struggling to survive on an income of $30 a week (equivalent to $340 in 2025). Being too poor to own a home, the Swaggarts lived in church basements, homes of pastors, and small motels. Sun Records producer Sam Phillips wanted to start a gospel line of music for the label (perhaps to remain in competition with RCA Victor and Columbia Records, who also had gospel lines at the time) and wanted Swaggart for Sun as the first gospel artist for the label. Swaggart's cousin, Jerry Lee Lewis, had previously signed with Sun and was reportedly earning $20,000 per week at the time. Although the offer meant a promise for significant income for him and his family, Swaggart turned Phillips down, stating that he was called to preach the gospel.

== Career ==
=== Ordination and early career ===
Preaching from a flatbed trailer donated to him, Swaggart began full-time evangelistic work in 1955. He began developing a revival-meeting following throughout the American South. In 1960, he began recording gospel music record albums and transmitting on Christian radio stations. In 1961, Swaggart was ordained by the Assemblies of God; a year later he began his radio ministry. In the late 1960s, Swaggart founded what was then a small church named the Family Worship Center in Baton Rouge, Louisiana; the church eventually became district-affiliated with the Assemblies of God.

In 1971, Swaggart began transmitting a weekly 30-minute telecast over various local television stations in Baton Rouge and also purchased a local AM radio station, WLUX (now WPFC). The station broadcast Christian feature stories, preaching and teaching to various fundamentalist and Pentecostal denominations and playing black gospel, Southern gospel, and inspirational music. Swaggart sold many of his radio stations gradually throughout the 1980s and early 1990s.

=== Shifting to television ===
By 1975, the television ministry had expanded to more stations around the United States, and he began to use television as his primary preaching forum. In 1978, the weekly telecast was increased to an hour. In 1980, Swaggart began a daily weekday telecast featuring Bible study and music, and the weekend, hour-long telecast included a service from either Family Worship Center (Swaggart's church) or an on-location crusade in a major city. In the early 1980s, the broadcasts expanded to major cities nationwide. By 1983, more than 250 television stations broadcast the telecast.

=== Promotion of RENAMO ===
Throughout the 1980s, Jimmy Swaggart Ministries was one of many American Evangelical leaders who promoted the South African-backed Mozambican National Resistance, aka RENAMO, which was accused of committing systematic war crimes during Mozambique's 15-year-long civil war. In addition to moral support and publicity, Swaggart Ministries was repeatedly accused of providing funding and material support to the group. In September 1985, government forces supported by Zimbabwe captured RENAMO's main headquarters inside Mozambique Casa Banana. Among the materials left behind by retreating rebels were piles of Swaggart's 1982 publication, "How to Receive The Baptism in the Holy Spirit", translated into Portuguese. During the 1988 trial of Australian missionary Ian Grey, who coordinated much of the private support to RENAMO, it was claimed by the defendant that Swaggart Ministries worked through Shekinah Ministries to provide support to RENAMO. That year, extensive media coverage of Swaggart and his businesses in the wake of a sex scandal largely excluded these allegations. In 1991, Covert Action Magazine and the government of Zimbabwe both accused Swaggart ministries of continuing to fund RENAMO.

=== Prostitution scandals ===
In 1988, Swaggart was accused of patronizing a prostitute. He was suspended and ultimately defrocked by the Assemblies of God. Three years later, he was implicated in another scandal involving prostitution. As a result, Swaggart's ministry became non-affiliated, nondenominational, and significantly smaller than it had been in the ministry's pre-scandal years. Swaggart's sex scandals received national media attention.

==== 1988 prostitution scandal ====
Swaggart's first prostitution scandal occurred in 1986 when he accused fellow Assemblies of God minister Marvin Gorman of having several affairs. Gorman was defrocked from the Assemblies of God, and his ministry was all but ended. Gorman filed a successful lawsuit against Swaggart for defamation and conspiracy to ruin his reputation; he was awarded damages amounting to $10 million in 1991. After an appeal, the parties settled the matter for $1.75 million.

Gorman hired his son Randy and son-in-law Garland Bilbo to watch the Travel Inn on Airline Highway in Metairie, a suburb of New Orleans. At the Travel Inn, the two men photographed Swaggart outside Room 7 with Debra Murphree, a local prostitute. Gorman arrived at the Travel Inn a short while later and confronted Swaggart.

According to Swaggart: The Unauthorized Biography of an American Evangelist, Gorman secured a promise from Swaggart that he would publicly apologize to Gorman and begin the process of Gorman's reinstatement to the Assemblies of God. Gorman offered to remain silent if Swaggart would publicly say that he lied about Gorman's affairs. Gorman waited almost a year, then hand-delivered a note to Swaggart informing him that his time was up; Swaggart did not respond. On February 16, 1988, Gorman contacted James Hamil, one of the 13-man Executive Presbytery of the Assemblies of God, to expose Swaggart's assignation with the prostitute. The presbytery leadership of the Assemblies of God suspended Swaggart from broadcasting his television program for three months.

According to the Associated Press, Murphree failed a polygraph test administered by a New York City Police Department polygraph expert. The test administrator concluded that Murphree had failed to tell the truth on all key questions concerning her statement. The test was administered after Murphree offered to sell the story to the National Enquirer for $100,000. Murphree failed questions about whether she was paid or promised money to "set up" Swaggart, and whether she made up the story to make money from it. In place of Murphree's interview, Enquirer editor Paul Levy published an accounting of Swaggart's family where they allegedly expressed their fears over Swaggart's health. Murphree, who blamed her failed polygraph on "cocaine use" the day before the test was given, was interviewed in Penthouse magazine.

This image of Swaggart brought to tears while delivering his "I have sinned" speech has often been used as a representation of the televangelist scandals of the late 1980s.

On February 21, 1988, without giving any details regarding his transgressions, Swaggart delivered what came to be known as his "I have sinned" speech on live television. He spoke tearfully to his family, congregation, TV audience, and ended his speech with a prayer: "I have sinned against You, my Lord, and I would ask that Your Precious Blood ... would wash and cleanse every stain until it is in the seas of God's forgetfulness never to be remembered against me anymore."

The national presbytery of the Assemblies of God extended Swaggart's suspension to their standard two-year suspension for sexual immorality. His return to the pulpit coincided with the end of the three-month suspension originally ordered by the denomination. Believing that Swaggart was not genuinely repentant in submitting to their authority, the hierarchy of the Assemblies of God defrocked him and therein removed his credentials and ministerial license.

Swaggart then became an independent and non-denominational Pentecostal minister, establishing Jimmy Swaggart Ministries, based at the Family Worship Center in Baton Rouge and the SonLife Broadcasting Network (SBN) which broadcasts in the United States and other countries.

==== 1991 prostitution scandal ====
On October 11, 1991, Swaggart was found in the company of a prostitute for a second time. He was pulled over by a police officer in Indio, California, for driving on the wrong side of the road. With him in the vehicle was a woman named Rosemary Garcia. According to Garcia, Swaggart had stopped to propose sex to her on the side of the road. She later told reporters: "He asked me for sex. I mean, that's why he stopped me. That's what I do. I'm a prostitute." This time, rather than confessing his sins to his congregation, Swaggart told those at Family Worship Center, "The Lord told me it's flat none of your business." He then temporarily stepped down as head of his ministry for "a time of healing and counseling".

== Ministries ==
=== Radio ===
Swaggart started SonLife Radio on the noncommercial FM band. Unlike his previous stations, SonLife was commercial-free and it did not sell time to outside ministries; the preaching and teaching were all produced in-house. The music which it played was primarily Southern gospel. SonLife Radio is streamed on the internet.

The network's flagship station is WJFM in Baton Rouge, Louisiana.

=== Television ===
In 1973, Swaggart proposed to television producers in Nashville a television program including a fairly large music segment, a short sermon, and time for talking about current ministry projects. They accepted, and within weeks the Jimmy Swaggart Telecast was being broadcast around the United States. In 1981, Swaggart launched a daily television program titled A Study in the Word. From the beginning, the primary cable channels which the program was aired on were CBN Cable (now Freeform), TBN, and the old PTL Network (now the Inspiration Network).

In 1988, Swaggart lost some of his broadcast and merchandise rights following his first prostitution scandal. In 1991, his career as a standard televangelist ended after more local TV stations canceled their contracts with him following his second prostitution scandal.

=== Jimmy Swaggart Bible College ===
In autumn 1984, Swaggart opened Jimmy Swaggart Bible College (JSBC). The college originally provided education and communication degrees. JSBC enrollment dropped drastically in 1988 when students left as a result of Swaggart's scandal and that was followed by accreditation issues.

In 1991, JSBC was renamed the World Evangelism Bible College and enrollment dropped to 370 students. The college closed programs in music, physical education, secretarial science, and communications that October and disbanded its basketball team. In November "the college laid off three Bible professors and an English professor, effective at the end of the fall semester".

=== Print ===
Swaggart wrote about 50 Christian books offered through his ministry. He was the author of the Expositor's Study Bible, 13 study guides, and 38 commentaries on the Bible. The ministry publishes a monthly magazine, The Evangelist. Swaggart published Religious Rock n Roll: A Wolf in Sheep's Clothing, in 1985.

=== Music ===
In 1981, Swaggart received a Grammy Award nomination for Best Gospel Performance, Traditional for his album Worship.

On June 30, 2025, one day before his death, Swaggart was inducted as part of the Southern Gospel Hall of Fame Class of 2025.

== Personal life and death ==
Swaggart married Frances Anderson on October 10, 1952. The couple had one child, Donnie Swaggart. Donnie and his son Gabriel are also preachers, making four generations of the Swaggart family to be involved in televangelism.

Although Swaggart was known as a leading figure in the emergence of the Christian Right, he had no political affiliation.

On June 15, 2025, it was reported that Swaggart had been hospitalized and was in intensive care after going into cardiac arrest at his home. His son, Donnie Swaggart, stated of his father: "Without a miracle, his time will be short."

Swaggart died in Baton Rouge on July 1, 2025, at age 90.
