= 88.9 FM =

FM radio frequency

The following radio stations broadcast on FM frequency 88.9 MHz:

== Argentina ==
- Radio 360 in Gualeguaychú, Entre Ríos
- Atalaya in Berazategui, Buenos Aires
- Bella Italia in Rafaela, Santa Fe
- Bemba in Villa María, Córdoba
- Cadena 3 Argentina in Venado Tuerto, Santa Fe
- Chabas "La Nueva Voz" in Chabás, Santa Fe
- Classic in Resistencia, Chaco
- Cooperativa in Inriville, Córdoba
- Cristal in Oberá, Misiones
- Del sol in Pigüé, Buenos Aires
- Eclipse in Torcuato, Buenos Aires
- Gran Rosario in Rosario, Santa Fe
- La 88 in Alta Gracia, Córdoba
- LRS851 Alejandra in Alejandra, Santa Fe
- El Nacional in Trenque Lauquen, Buenos Aires
- Light in Posadas, Misiones
- Munizipium in Zárate, Buenos Aires
- Namunkurá in Puerto Madryn, Chubut
- Oid Mortales in Concordia, Entre Ríos
- Pobre Johnny in Córdoba
- Radio 8 in Santa Clara de Buena Vista, Santa Fe
- Radio María in Daireaux, Buenos Aires
- Radio María in San Fernando del Valle de Catamarca, Catamarca
- Radio María in Santa María, Catamarca
- Radio María in San Miguel, Corrientes
- Radio María in La Paz, Entre Ríos
- Raíces Rock in La Plata, Buenos Aires
- Renuevo Radio in Buenos Aires
- Signos in San Carlos de Bolívar, Provincia de Buenos Aires
- Sur in Quilmes, Buenos Aires
- Suyay in Neuquén
- U in San Nicolás De Los Arroyos, Buenos Aires
- Universidad in Lujan, Buenos Aires
- Radio FM Cumbiambera in Salta

== Australia ==
- 88.9 FM, Richmond Valley Radio Bora Ridge, Far North Coast, New South Wales
- 2YOU in Tamworth, New South Wales
- 2RSR in Sydney, New South Wales
- SBS Radio in Bathurst, New South Wales
- 5HR in Mount Barker, South Australia
- Triple J in Queenstown, Tasmania
- 3HFM in Hamilton, Victoria
- WYN-FM in Melbourne, Victoria

* KCRFM in perth, Western Australia

== Belize ==
- Love FM at Caye Caulker

== Brazil ==
- Jangadeiro FM (ZYC 417) in Fortaleza, Ceará

== Canada (Channel 205) ==
- CBAL-FM-3 in Campbellton, New Brunswick
- CBAX-FM-1 in Charlottetown, Prince Edward Island
- CBPO-FM in Parry Sound, Ontario
- CBTK-FM in Kelowna, British Columbia
- CBUX-FM-1 in Victoria, British Columbia
- CBVX-FM-3 in Baie St-Paul, Quebec
- CBWU-FM in Cranberry Portage, Manitoba
- CFNJ-FM-1 in St. Zenon, Quebec
- CHNI-FM in Saint John, New Brunswick
- CHYF-FM in M'Chigeeng First Nation, Ontario
- CIMF-FM-1 in Hawkesbury, Ontario
- CIRV-FM in Toronto, Ontario
- CJMQ-FM in Lennoxville, Quebec
- CJRD-FM in Drummondville, Quebec
- CJSI-FM in Calgary, Alberta
- CKSB-FM-1 in Regina, Saskatchewan
- CKYL-FM-5 in Saddle Hills, Alberta
- VF2385 in Emerson, Manitoba
- VF2386 in Morris, Manitoba
- VF2391 in Portage la Prairie, Manitoba
- VF2392 in Headingley, Manitoba
- VF2413 in North Battleford, Saskatchewan
- VF2425 in Birds Hill Park, Manitoba
- VF2453 in Camp Lisette, Quebec
- VF2511 in Brandon, Manitoba
- VF2512 in Virden, Manitoba
- VF2565 in Salmo, British Columbia
- VF8001 in Shawinigan, Quebec

== China ==
- former CRI News Radio in Chengdu (changed to air local programme)
- CNR The Voice Of China in Zhaoqing

== Greece ==
- Krites 88.9 in Hania Prefecture

== Malaysia ==
- goXuan in Klang Valley and Eastern Pahang
- Nasional FM in Kota Kinabalu, Sabah

== Mexico ==
- XHAJ-FM in Saltillo, Coahuila
- XHAXA-FM in Oaxaca, Oaxaca
- XHBE-FM in El Progreso, Veracruz
- XHCCCU-FM in Mérida, Yucatán
- XHENS-FM in Navojoa, Sonora
- XHESON-FM in Hermosillo, Sonora
- XHFIL-FM in Mazatlán, Sinaloa
- XHIZM-FM in Izúcar de Matamoros, Puebla
- XHKOK-FM in Acapulco, Guerrero
- XHLDO-FM in Nuevo Laredo, Tamaulipas
- XHM-FM in Mexico City
- XHPGVS-FM in Guasave, Sinaloa
- XHPQGA-FM in Quiroga, Michoacán
- XHPTAM-FM in Tamazula de Gordiano, Jalisco
- XHPYAS-FM in Playas de Catazajá, Chiapas
- XHSBC-FM in San Juan Bautista Cuicatlán, Oaxaca
- XHSSA-FM in Sonoyta, Sonora
- XHTLJ-FM in Tlaxiaco, Oaxaca
- XHUACC-FM in Ciudad del Carmen, Campeche
- XHXV-FM in Tierra Blanca, Guanajuato

== Netherlands ==
- Arrow Jazz FM in Maastricht, Limburg

== Philippines ==
- MRGV FM in Guihulngan, Negros Oriental
- DYDB in Bais, Negros Oriental
- DYTJ in Tuburan, Cebu
- DYNC in Tubigon, Bohol
- DXFL in Dipolog
- DXCX in Tacurong

== Singapore ==
- The BBC World Service transmitting in Singapore

== United States (Channel 205) ==
- KAIC (FM) in Tucson, Arizona
- KAIP in Wapello, Iowa
- KAIW in Saratoga, Wyoming
- KAKV in El Dorado, Arkansas
- KAOW in Fort Smith, Arkansas
- KARU in Cache, Oklahoma
- KAWC in Yuma, Arizona
- KAWP in Parker, Arizona
- KBVD in Alturas, California
- KCHG in Cedar City, Utah
- KCJX in Carbondale, Colorado
- KCSH in Ellensburg, Washington
- KDUV in Visalia, California
- KEFX in Twin Falls, Idaho
- KENM in Tucumcari, New Mexico
- KETR in Commerce, Texas
- KEUL in Girdwood, Alaska
- KFPR in Redding, California
- KFRD in Butte, Montana
- KGFC in Great Falls, Montana
- KGLV in Manhattan, Kansas
- KHII in Cloudcroft, New Mexico
- KHJC in Lihue, Hawaii
- KHPS in Uvalde, Texas
- KJCB in Lockwood, Montana
- KJGC in Garden City, Kansas
- KJIA in Spirit Lake, Iowa
- KJJF in Harlingen, Texas
- KJKF in Klamath Falls, Oregon
- KJLP in Palmer, Alaska
- KJLU in Jefferson City, Missouri
- KKSO in Mitchellville, Iowa
- KLCZ in Lewiston, Idaho
- KLDN in Lufkin, Texas
- KLLU in Gallup, New Mexico
- KLOF in Gillette, Wyoming
- KLVM in Santa Cruz, California
- KMIH in Mercer Island, Washington
- KMPR in Minot, North Dakota
- KNBE in Beatrice, Nebraska
- KNGM in Guymon, Oklahoma
- KNGW in Juneau, Alaska
- KNMI (FM) in Farmington, New Mexico
- KNPR in Las Vegas, Nevada
- KNSR in Collegeville, Minnesota
- KOBK in Baker City, Oregon
- KOHR in Sheridan, Wyoming
- KOPO-LP in Paia, Hawaii
- KOSW in Ocean Shores, Washington
- KPJU-LP in El Paso, Texas
- KPLK in Sedro-Woolley, Washington
- KPOV-FM in Bend, Oregon
- KPRD in Hays, Kansas
- KQFE in Springfield, Oregon
- KQMI in Manzanita, Oregon
- KRFC in Fort Collins, Colorado
- KRNW in Chillicothe, Missouri
- KRUC in Las Cruces, New Mexico
- KSDW in Temecula, California
- KSEF in Farmington, Missouri
- KSJP in Ipswich, South Dakota
- KSTM in Indianola, Iowa
- KSWS in Chehalis, Washington
- KTLW in Lancaster, California
- KTNA in Talkeetna, Alaska
- KTSN-FM in Blowout, Texas
- KUAS-FM in Sierra Vista, Arizona
- KUCI in Irvine, California
- KUHN in Golden Meadow, Louisiana
- KVMG in Raton, New Mexico
- KVPP in Pago Pago, American Samoa
- KWAA in Mart, Texas
- KWCV in Walnut Ridge, Arkansas
- KWVI in Waverly, Iowa
- KWXC in Grove, Oklahoma
- KXLU in Los Angeles, California
- KXPR in Sacramento, California
- KXWB in Nipomo, California
- KYCL-FM in Clarendon, Texas
- KYFG in Omaha, Nebraska
- KYLF in Adrian, Missouri
- KYLV in Oklahoma City, Oklahoma
- KYMR-FM in Metlakatla, Alaska
- KYOR in Newport, Oregon
- KZYK in Santee, Nebraska
- WAJM in Atlantic City, New Jersey
- WARG in Summit, Illinois
- WBJV in Steubenville, Ohio
- WBKG (FM) in Macon, Georgia
- WBLU in Grand Rapids, Michigan
- WBYO in Sellersville, Pennsylvania
- WBZC in Pemberton, New Jersey
- WCIJ in Unadilla, New York
- WCIY in Canandaigua, New York
- WCRR in Manistique, Michigan
- WCSU in Wilberforce, Ohio
- WCVE in Richmond, Virginia
- WCVF in Fredonia, New York
- WDBM in East Lansing, Michigan
- WDNA in Miami, Florida
- WDTR in Imlay City, Michigan
- WEAA in Baltimore, Maryland
- WEIU in Charleston, Illinois
- WEKU in Richmond, Kentucky
- WEPS in Elgin, Illinois
- WERS in Boston, Massachusetts
- WFRS in Smithtown, New York
- WFSE in Edinboro, Pennsylvania
- WFSU in Tallahassee, Florida
- WGEN-FM in Monee, Illinois
- WGUR in Milledgeville, Georgia
- WGZR in Alpena, Michigan
- WHEI in Tiffin, Ohio
- WHEY in North Muskegon, Michigan
- WIIT in Chicago, Illinois
- WILF in Monroeville, Alabama
- WJMJ in Hartford, Connecticut
- WJTA in Glandorf, Ohio
- WJYW in Union City, Indiana
- WKEU in The Rock, Georgia
- WKTO in Edgewater, Florida
- WKVC in North Myrtle Beach, South Carolina
- WKYU in Bowling Green, Kentucky
- WLFH in Claxton, Georgia
- WLFN in Flint, Michigan
- WLNX in Lincoln, Illinois
- WLRY in Rushville, Ohio
- WLSU in La Crosse, Wisconsin
- WLXJ in Battle Ground, Indiana
- WMAU in Bude, Mississippi
- WMBW in Chattanooga, Tennessee
- WMCX in West Long Branch, New Jersey
- WMDR in Oakland, Maine
- WMFT in Tuscaloosa, Alabama
- WMSB in Byhalia, Mississippi
- WMSL in Athens, Georgia
- WMVA in Painter, Virginia
- WMWX in Miamitown, Ohio
- WMXM in Lake Forest, Illinois
- WMYJ-FM in Oolitic, Indiana
- WNSC in Rock Hill, South Carolina
- WNYO (FM) in Oswego, New York
- WOJB in Reserve, Wisconsin
- WPUC in Ponce, Puerto Rico
- WQCS in Fort Pierce, Florida
- WQRN in Cook, Minnesota
- WQSU in Selinsgrove, Pennsylvania
- WRDL in Ashland, Ohio
- WRKV in Raleigh, North Carolina
- WRPJ in Port Jervis, New York
- WRRG in River Grove, Illinois
- WSIA in Staten Island, New York
- WSLJ in Watertown, New York
- WSND in Notre Dame, Indiana
- WSOH in Zanesfield, Ohio
- WSTB in Streetsboro, Ohio
- WTAI (FM) in Union City, Tennessee
- WTPG in Whitehouse, Ohio
- WUND in Manteo, North Carolina
- WVBA in Brattleboro, Vermont
- WVEP in Martinsburg, West Virginia
- WVPW in Buckhannon, West Virginia
- WVRN (FM) in Wittenberg, Wisconsin
- WVSI in Mount Vernon, Illinois
- WVWG in Seelyville, Indiana
- WWES in Mt. Kisco, New York
- WWGN in Ottawa, Illinois
- WWIO in Brunswick, Georgia
- WWNW in New Wilmington, Pennsylvania
- WYFE in Tarpon Springs, Florida
- WYMS in Milwaukee, Wisconsin
- WYRR in Lakewood, New York
- WYWL in Harvard, Illinois
- WZLC in Summerville, South Carolina
