= KAWC =

KAWC may refer to:

- KAWC-FM, a radio station (88.9 FM) licensed to serve Yuma, Arizona, United States
- KOFA (AM), a radio station (1320 AM) licensed to serve Yuma, Arizona, which held the call sign KAWC from 1970 to 2017
