= WXGC =

WXGC was the previous broadcast callsign of two radio stations at Georgia College & State University in Milledgeville, Georgia:

- WGUR (FM) 88.9 was WXGC from its founding in the 1970s until 1997
- WRGC-FM 88.3 was assigned WXGC in its original construction permit
