= Public higher education in Mexico =

Public higher education in Mexico is the one that is taught after high school or equivalent (higher secondary education). It is carried out through higher education institutions (IES) of the public sector. The main degree taken by the majority of students is licenciatura (bachelor's degree), which is usually accredited between 4 and 5 years in minimum time for those who finish their studies. The degrees offered are técnico superior universitario (associate's degree), licenciatura (bachelor's degree), specialization, master's degree and doctorate. In addition, diploma courses and continuing education courses are offered.

== Public higher education institutions ==
=== Universidades Públicas Estatales (State Public Universities) ===
They are institutions of higher education created by decree of local congresses, under the legal figure of decentralized public bodies. These state institutions develop the functions of teaching, generation and innovative application of knowledge, as well as the extension and dissemination of culture. They include:

- Universidad Autónoma de Aguascalientes
- Universidad Autónoma de Baja California
- Universidad Autónoma de Baja California Sur
- Universidad Autónoma de Campeche
- Universidad Autónoma del Carmen
- Universidad Autónoma de Coahuila
- Universidad de Colima
- Universidad Autónoma de Chiapas
- Universidad Autónoma de Chihuahua
- Universidad Autónoma de Ciudad Juárez
- Universidad Juárez del Estado de Durango
- Universidad de Guanajuato
- Universidad Autónoma de Guerrero
- Universidad Autónoma del Estado de Hidalgo
- Universidad de Guadalajara
- Universidad Autónoma del Estado de México
- Universidad Michoacana de San Nicolás de Hidalgo
- Universidad Autónoma del Estado de Morelos
- Universidad Autónoma de Nayarit
- Universidad Autónoma de Nuevo León
- Universidad Autónoma Benito Juárez de Oaxaca
- Benemérita Universidad Autónoma de Puebla
- Universidad Autónoma de Querétaro
- Universidad de Quintana Roo
- Universidad Autónoma de San Luis Potosí
- Universidad Autónoma de Sinaloa
- Universidad de Sonora
- Instituto Tecnológico de Sonora
- Universidad Juárez Autónoma de Tabasco
- Universidad Autónoma de Tamaulipas
- Universidad Autónoma de Tlaxcala
- Universidad Veracruzana
- Universidad Autónoma de Yucatán
- Universidad Autónoma de Zacatecas

=== Universidades Politécnicas (Polytechnical Universities) ===
They are an educational project created in 2001 to offer engineering careers, undergraduate and postgraduate studies at the specialty level. Its programs are designed based on the Competency-Based Educational Model and are oriented in applied research to technological development. They include:

- Universidad Politécnica de Aguascalientes
- Universidad Politécnica de Baja California
- Universidad Politécnica de Chiapas
- Universidad Politécnica de Tapachula
- Universidad Politécnica de Chihuahua
- Universidad Politécnica de Piedras Negras
- Universidad Politécnica de Ramos Arizpe
- Universidad Politécnica Cuencamé
- Universidad Politécnica de Durango
- Universidad Politécnica de Gómez Palacio
- Universidad Politécnica de Tecámac
- Universidad Politécnica de Texcoco
- Universidad Politécnica del Valle de México
- Universidad Politécnica del Valle de Toluca
- Universidad Politécnica de Guanajuato
- Universidad Politécnica Juventino Rosas
- Universidad Politécnica de Pénjamo
- Universidad Politécnica del Bicentenario
- Universidad Politécnica del Estado de Guerrero
- Universidad Politécnica de Francisco I. Madero
- Universidad Politécnica de Huejutla
- Universidad Politécnica Metropolitana de Hidalgo
- Universidad Politécnica de Pachuca
- Universidad Politécnica de Tulancingo
- Universidad Politécnica de la Zona Metropolitana de Guadalajara
- Universidad Politécnica de Lázaro Cárdenas
- Universidad Politécnica de Uruapan
- Universidad Politécnica del Estado Morelos
- Universidad Politécnica de Apodaca
- Universidad Politécnica de Amozoc
- Universidad Politécnica Metropolitana de Puebla
- Universidad Politécnica de Puebla
- Universidad Politécnica de Querétaro
- Universidad Politécnica de Santa Rosa Jáuregui
- Universidad Politécnica de Bacalar
- Universidad Politécnica de Quintana Roo
- Universidad Politécnica de San Luis Potosí
- Universidad Politécnica del Mar y la Sierra
- Universidad Politécnica de Sinaloa
- Universidad Politécnica del Valle de Évora
- Universidad Politécnica del Centro
- Universidad Politécnica del Golfo de México
- Universidad Politécnica Mesoamericana
- Universidad Politécnica de Altamira
- Universidad Politécnica de la Región Ribereña
- Universidad Politécnica de Victoria
- Universidad Politécnica de Tlaxcala Región Poniente
- Universidad Politécnica de Tlaxcala
- Universidad Politécnica de Huatusco
- Universidad Politécnica del Sur de Zacatecas
- Universidad Politécnica de Zacatecas
