= WGEN =

WGEN may refer to:

- WGEN-FM, a radio station (88.9 FM) licensed to serve Monee, Illinois, United States
- WGEN-TV, a television station (channel 8) licensed to serve Key West, Florida, United States
- WGEN-LD, a low-power television station (channel 8) licensed to serve Miami, Florida
- KIIK-FM, a radio station (104.9 FM) licensed to serve DeWitt, Iowa, United States, which held the call sign WGEN-FM from 1980 to 1998
- WGIN (AM), a defunct radio station (1500 AM), licensed from Geneseo, Illinois
