= KVER =

KVER may refer to:

- KVER-CD, a low-power television station (channel 27, virtual 41) licensed to Indio, California, United States
- KVER (FM), a radio station (91.1 FM) licensed to El Paso, Texas, United States
- Jesse Viertel Memorial Airport (ICAO code KVER)
