= Lofty 88.9 =

Lofty 88.9 (5LCM)
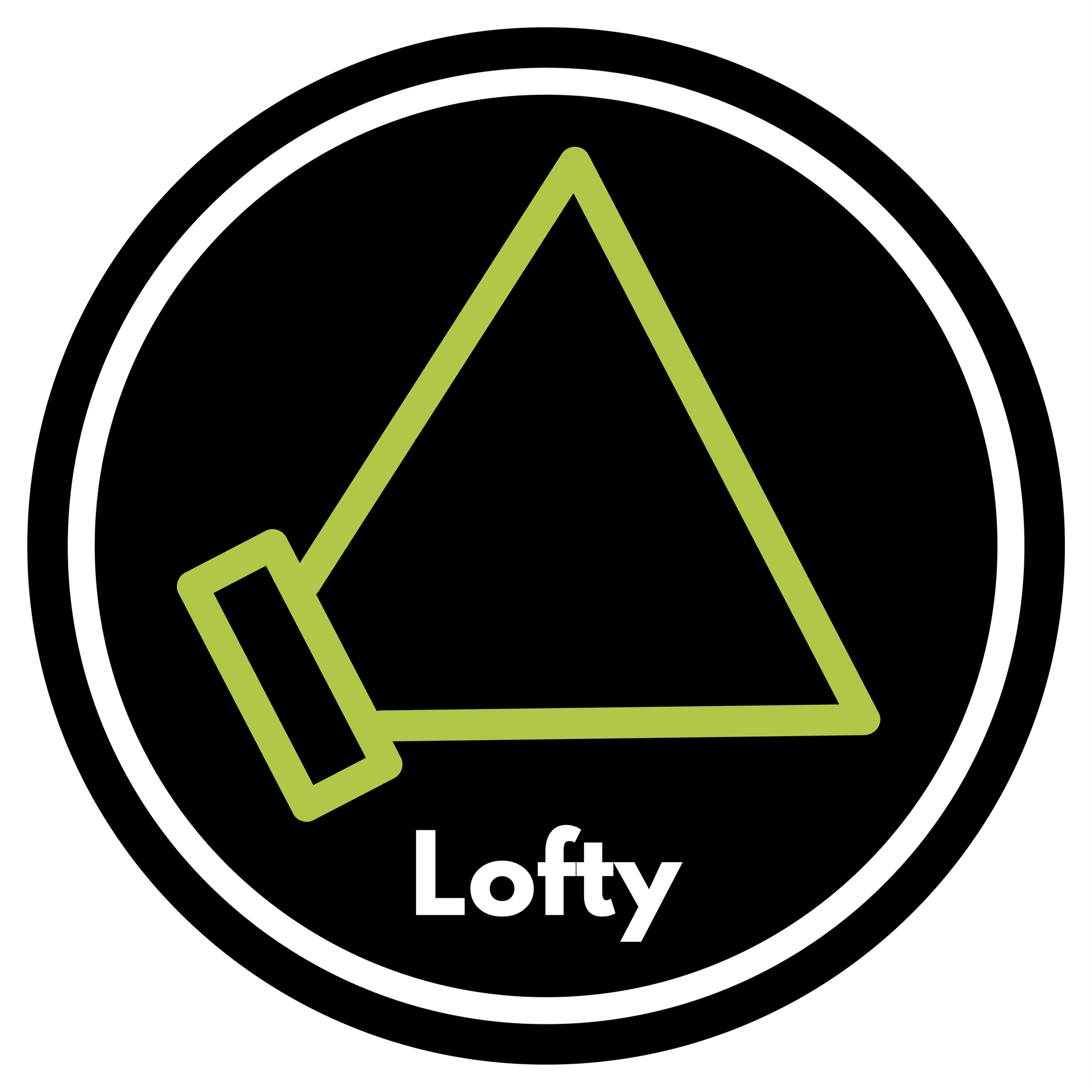
- Mount Barker, South Australia; Australia
- Broadcast area: Adelaide Hills
- Frequency: 88.9 MHz

Programming
- Format: Community Radio/Alternative

Ownership
- Owner: Lofty Community Media Incorporated

History
- First air date: 25 November 2018
- Call sign meaning: "Lofty Community Media"

Technical information
- Licensing authority: ACMA
- ERP: 500W

Links
- Public licence information: Profile
- Website: lofty.org.au

Lofty 88.9 (ACMA call sign 5LCM) is a community radio station based in Mount Barker, South Australia, named in reference to its location in the Mount Lofty Ranges.

The station is staffed entirely by volunteers.

== History ==
Lofty Community Media Incorporated (Lofty) was formed in June 2017 as a progressive alternative to similar media outlets operating in the Adelaide Hills area.

Initially operating as an online-only radio station, Lofty was granted a temporary community broadcasting licence (TCBL) by the Australian Communications and Media Authority (ACMA) in November 2018

From November 2018, Lofty 88.9 shared the 88.9 MHz frequency with another TCBL holder, Hills Radio. During this period, Lofty 88.9 broadcast on Sundays, Mondays, and Tuesdays.

In October 2019, ACMA invited applications for a long-term community broadcasting licence in the Mount Barker area of the Adelaide Hills via a competitive process that attracted multiple applicants, including Lofty 88.9 and Hills Radio.

In September 2020, ACMA granted this licence to Lofty 88.9 based on Lofty’s application "demonstrating a strong focus on encouraging community participation in the operations and programming of the station".

Lofty 88.9 commenced broadcasting full-time on 1 October 2020.

== Programming ==
Lofty 88.9 broadcasts a range of locally produced shows, along with a number of syndicated shows sourced from the Community Radio Network (Australia), Deutsche Welle and independent producers.

== Awards ==
2018 SACBA Bilby Award for Best Sports Broadcast (runner-up)

2021 SACBA Bilby Awards for Youth Contribution (runner-up), Best Radio Program (runner-up), Sports Broadcast, Interview

== Affiliations ==
Community Broadcasting Association of Australia (CBAA)

South Australian Community Broadcasters Association (SACBA)
