= WCSU =

WCSU may refer to:

- Western Connecticut State University
- WCSU-FM, a radio station (88.9 FM) licensed to Wilberforce, Ohio, United States
