= WMSB =

WMSB may refer to:

- WMSB (FM), a radio station (88.9 FM) in Byhalia, Mississippi
- WLRK (FM), a radio station (91.5 FM) in Greenville, Mississippi, which held the call sign WMSB in 2003
- WKAR-TV a television station in East Lansing, Michigan, which held the call sign WMSB from 1959 to 1972
