= KHII =

KHII may refer to:

- KHII (FM), a radio station (88.9 FM) licensed to serve Cloudcroft, New Mexico, United States
- KHII-TV, a television station (channel 22/PSIP 9) licensed to serve Honolulu, Hawaii, United States
- the ICAO code for Lake Havasu City Airport in Lake Havasu City, Arizona
- Kingdom Hearts II
