= Delfines de la Unacar =

- Full name: Delfines de la UNACAR
- Nickname: Delfines(dolphins)
- Ground: Gimnasio de la UNACAR, Ciudad del Carmen, Mexico
- Chairman: Jose Antonio Del Rio
- Manager: Alfredo Lugo Valdez
- League: Tercera División de México
Home colours	Away colours

Delfines de la UNACAR is a Mexican football club that played in the Tercera División de México. The club was based in Ciudad del Carmen, Mexico and represented the Universidad Autónoma del Carmen.
