= XHESON-FM =

Radio station in Hermosillo, Sonora

- Hermosillo, Sonora; Mexico
- Frequency: 88.9 FM
- Branding: La Poderosa

Programming
- Format: Regional Mexican

Ownership
- Owner: Grupo Radiorama; (Radiodifusora de Hermosillo, S.A. de C.V.)

History
- First air date: November 12, 1988 (concession)
- Call sign meaning: SONora

Technical information
- Licensing authority: CRT
- Class: B1
- ERP: 6,500 watts
- HAAT: 239.7 m (786 ft)
- Transmitter coordinates: 29°03′48″N 110°56′17″W

Links
- Webcast: Listen live
- Website: radioramasonora.com

XHESON-FM is a radio station on 88.9 FM in Hermosillo, Sonora. It is owned by Grupo Radiorama and is known as La Poderosa, carrying a Regional Mexican format.

== History ==
XESON-AM 680 received its concession on November 12, 1988. It was owned by María del Socorro Martínez Contreras, María del Socorro, and María Eugenia Vidal Martínez. Ownership passed to Grupo ACIR in 2000. The station migrated to FM in 2011.

ACIR sold most of its Sonora stations to Radiorama, which turned around and transferred operation of them to Grupo Larsa Comunicaciones. Larsa operated the station with a Spanish adult hits format as Toño, which was described as the company's "principal product" and its primary format.

As part of the transition from Grupo Larsa Comunicaciones to ISA Multimedia, XHESON dropped the Toño name and became Hermosillo's first Los 40 Principales pop music station on August 3, 2019.

ISA Multimedia ceased operations of its Hermosillo cluster on December 31, 2021. On January 15, 2022, the station changed to a Regional Mexican format known as "La Poderosa", as Radiorama resumed direct operation of the station; that same day, XHVSS became Arroba FM.
