= XHPQGA-FM =

Radio station in Quiroga, Michoacán, Mexico

- Quiroga, Michoacán, Mexico; Mexico
- Frequency: 88.9 MHz
- Branding: La Ke Buena

Programming
- Format: Regional Mexican
- Affiliations: Radiópolis

Ownership
- Owner: Grupo Vox; (La Voz del Viento, S.A. de C.V.)
- Sister stations: XHMICH-FM Morelia

History
- First air date: 2018
- Call sign meaning: QuiroGA

Technical information
- Class: A
- ERP: 3 kW

Links
- Webcast: Listen live
- Website: www.kebuenaquiroga.com

XHPQGA-FM is a radio station on 88.9 FM in Quiroga, Michoacán, Mexico. It carries the Ke Buena national grupera format from Radiópolis.

== History ==
XHPQGA was awarded in the IFT-4 radio auction of 2017 and came to air in early 2018.
