= WKNO-FM =

Public radio station in Memphis, Tennessee

Memphis, Tennessee; United States
- Broadcast area: Memphis, Tennessee
- Frequency: 91.1 MHz (HD Radio)
- Branding: NPR For the Mid South

Programming
- Format: Classical music and NPR news/talk
- Subchannels: HD2: Classical music and NPR news/talk; HD3: BBC World Service
- Affiliations: National Public Radio, American Public Media, Public Radio Exchange

Ownership
- Owner: Mid-South Public Communications Foundation

History
- First air date: March 1972
- Call sign meaning: Knowledge

Technical information
- Licensing authority: FCC
- Facility ID: 41887
- Class: C1
- ERP: 100,000 watts
- HAAT: 175 meters (574 ft)
- Transmitter coordinates: 35°9′14.00″N 89°49′19.00″W

Links
- Public license information: Public file; LMS
- Webcast: Listen live
- Website: wknofm.org

Simulcast
- WKNP

Jackson, Tennessee; United States
- Broadcast area: Jackson, Tennessee
- Frequency: 90.1 MHz (HD Radio)

Ownership
- Owner: Mid-South Public Communications Foundation

History
- First air date: December 5, 1990
- Former call signs: WJTR-FM (1990–1992)
- Call sign meaning: "P" is the next alphabetical letter after "O"

Technical information
- Facility ID: 41885
- Class: C2
- ERP: 18,000 watts
- HAAT: 156.2 meters (512 ft)
- Transmitter coordinates: 35°38′49.30″N 88°50′0.20″W

Links
- Public license information: Public file; LMS

The WKNO FM Stations is a pair of public radio stations based in Memphis, Tennessee, that serve the "Mid-South" region with local fine arts and classical music programs, as well as news and information programs from the National Public Radio, Public Radio International, and American Public Media networks.

The stations are owned and operated by the Mid-South Public Communications Foundation, a non-profit organization governed by a board of trustees composed of volunteers. This board also operates Memphis' public television station, WKNO.

Two stations comprise the network:

- WKNO-FM 91.1: Memphis (flagship). Signal reaches about a 50-mile radius from the city, covering the southwestern corner of Tennessee, eastern Arkansas, the extreme southern portions of the Missouri Bootheel, and northwestern Mississippi.
- WKNP 90.1: Jackson, Tennessee. Signal covers much of the state between the Memphis area, the Tennessee River, and the Kentucky state line.

== History ==
The Memphis Community Television Foundation, owner of WKNO television since 1956, filed an application with the FCC on November 2, 1970, to build a new public radio station to serve Memphis, which was granted on February 9, 1971. The station began broadcasting on June 26, 1971, at a party to mark the 15th anniversary of the television station's launch. (WKNO-FM did not launch in earnest until March 1972.) The studios were first located on the main campus of Memphis State University (now the University of Memphis). In 1979, the WKNO-FM and TV studios were relocated a few blocks to the south, to the southern annex of MSU on Getwell Road. That facility served the television and radio stations for 30 years until November 2009, when they moved into custom-designed all-digital studios, located in the Memphis suburb of Cordova.

As with many public radio outlets started during that era, programming in the early years consisted almost entirely of classical music. NPR news broadcasts did not become a significant portion of the daily schedule until well into the 1980s. The station increased its power during that period to a full 100,000 watts, thereby increasing its listenership with a stronger, clearer signal. As the popularity of public radio developed, the MSPCF decided to aggressively construct and acquire transmitters throughout the region, much of which had never been served by public radio before. It started by purchasing WNJC-FM 88.9, the defunct campus radio station (founded 1971) of Northwest Mississippi Community College in Senatobia, about 40 miles south of Memphis, in 1989; the college had shuttered the station the year prior and reallocated its budget to other uses. MSPCF kept that station's original call sign for a few years before renaming it to WKNA in 1992.

Next, the board set its sights on Tennessee's largest city without any public radio service, Jackson, and in December 1990 started a repeater, WJTR-FM. In April 1992, the station changed its call letters to WKNP. Finally, in 1993, WKNO-FM solidified its coverage of West Tennessee with a repeater serving northwestern Tennessee and southeastern Missouri, WKNQ. Situated in the town of Dyersburg, that station broadcast at 90.7 MHz.

For a few years, the stations broadcast identical programs, except for daytime coverage of Memphis city council meetings, which were heard only on the mother station. In some portions of the listening area, particularly that of WKNA-FM, competing stations such as Mississippi Public Broadcasting duplicated some network offerings as well. As early as 1992, the Senatobia station began to air some differentiated programming from WKNO.

Eventually, however, with the great expansion of public radio news and talk programming in the late 1990s, MSPCF decided to take advantage of it by splitting the network into two. With that, the Memphis and Jackson stations began to program classical music during the middle of the day and at night, news and information during rush hour, and weekly feature programs on the weekends, continuing WKNO's historic practices. Meanwhile, the Dyersburg and Senatobia frequencies carried news, talk, and information shows from various public radio packagers and the BBC instead. On occasion, the four stations aired the same programming.

=== 2007 transmitter sale ===
In early 2007, WKNO/MSPCF sold the Senatobia and Dyersburg stations, WKNA and WKNQ, to religious broadcasters, with the American Family Association buying WKNA for the American Family Radio talk network (currently WMSB), and the Educational Media Foundation buying WKNQ for its K-Love CCM network (currently WZKV-FM). MSPCF president Michael LaBonia said that WKNO's hopes to expand the coverage areas of the two stations were unsuccessful. He stated that WKNA's signal, for example, was barely listenable in northern Mississippi outside of a small radius, one factor that led to the sale of the frequencies. The sale left the northwestern corner of Tennessee as one of the few areas in the U.S. without a clear signal from an NPR station, the closest signal being Murray, Kentucky's WKMS. However, the WKNA service area could also receive public radio from Mississippi Public Broadcasting, a state agency. According to the Memphis Flyer, MSPCF netted some $2.8 million from the transaction with the religious networks. The two additional transmitters had a smaller base of listener support than the core area WKNO/WKNP served due to their more rural, less populated coverage areas; they were subsidized by WKNO to the tune of $93,000 a year on average over 15 years.

=== Current schedule ===
After the sale, WKNO/WKNP reconfigured its schedule to conform to national expectations for public radio stations, while still providing significant hours of classical music. The current lineup features NPR newscasts throughout the day; NPR news magazines, such as All Things Considered and Morning Edition in morning and afternoon drive time slots; Marketplace from American Public Media in the late afternoons; Fresh Air in the early evening; with local programming during the daytime on weekends, as well as the Metropolitan Opera broadcasts, and several lighthearted shows from NPR, APM, and PRI. Jazz and blues music shows were added to the Saturday evening lineup in 2020. Classical music is heard at other times.

=== HD Radio services ===
In late 2007, WKNO/WKNP began broadcasting digitally, so listeners with an HD radio are able to receive three streams. The first stream is a simulcast of the analog signal. A second stream alternates between NPR and American Public Media shows when classical music is broadcast on the first stream, and classical music when the first stream broadcasts NPR, PRI and APM spoken-word programming. The third stream offers 24/7 news from the BBC World Service, something previously available on WKNA and WKNQ.
