= XHAJ-FM =

Radio station in Saltillo, Coahuila

- Saltillo, Coahuila; Mexico
- Frequency: 88.9 FM
- Branding: La Primera

Programming
- Format: News/talk and Country Music

Ownership
- Owner: Compañía Periodística Criterios, S.A. de C.V.

History
- First air date: July 16, 1962 (concession)
- Call sign meaning: Alberto Jaubert

Technical information
- Licensing authority: CRT
- Class: B
- ERP: 25 kW
- HAAT: −176.73 m (−579.8 ft)
- Transmitter coordinates: 25°24′06″N 100°58′38″W

Links
- Webcast: Listen live
- Website: eldiariodecoahuila.com.mx

XHAJ-FM is a radio station on 88.9 FM in Saltillo, Coahuila, Mexico. The station is owned by Compañía Periodística Criterios, S.A. de C.V., owner of the El Diario de Coahuila newspaper, and carries its talk format known as La Primera.

== History ==
XEAJ-AM 1330 came to air on July 16, 1962. It was owned by Carlos G. Cirilo Treviño and soon sold to Radio Bonita, S.A., but from the start it was operated by the Jaubert family. Criterios bought XEAJ in 2000 and migrated it to FM in 2011.
