= Ashland University =

Christian university in Ashland, Ohio, US

Coordinates: 40°51′42″N 82°19′23″W

- Former name: Ashland College (1878–1989)
- Motto: "Accent on the Individual"
- Type: Private university
- Established: 1878; 148 years ago
- Religious affiliation: The Brethren Church
- Endowment: $47.6 million (2020)
- President: Jon Parrish Peede
- Faculty: 188
- Students: 6,419
- Location: Ashland, Ohio, U.S.
- Campus: Suburban, 135 acres (55 ha)
- Colors: Purple and gold
- Nickname: Eagles
- Sporting affiliations: NCAA Division II – G-MAC
- Mascot: Tuffy the Eagle
- Website: www.ashland.edu

Ashland University is a private university in Ashland, Ohio, United States. The university consists of a 135-acre (55 ha) main campus and several off-campus centers throughout central and northern Ohio. Ashland was founded in 1878 as Ashland College. It is affiliated with The Brethren Church.

In addition to a graduate school, the university consists of four colleges: the College of Arts and Sciences, the Schar College of Education, the Dauch College of Business and Economics, and the Schar College of Nursing and Health Sciences and offers over 60 college majors. Ashland Theological Seminary, a division of Ashland University, offers a Doctor of Ministry (D.Min.) degree as well as master's degrees. Ashland is classified as a master's university with most graduate research being in a professional field.

== History ==
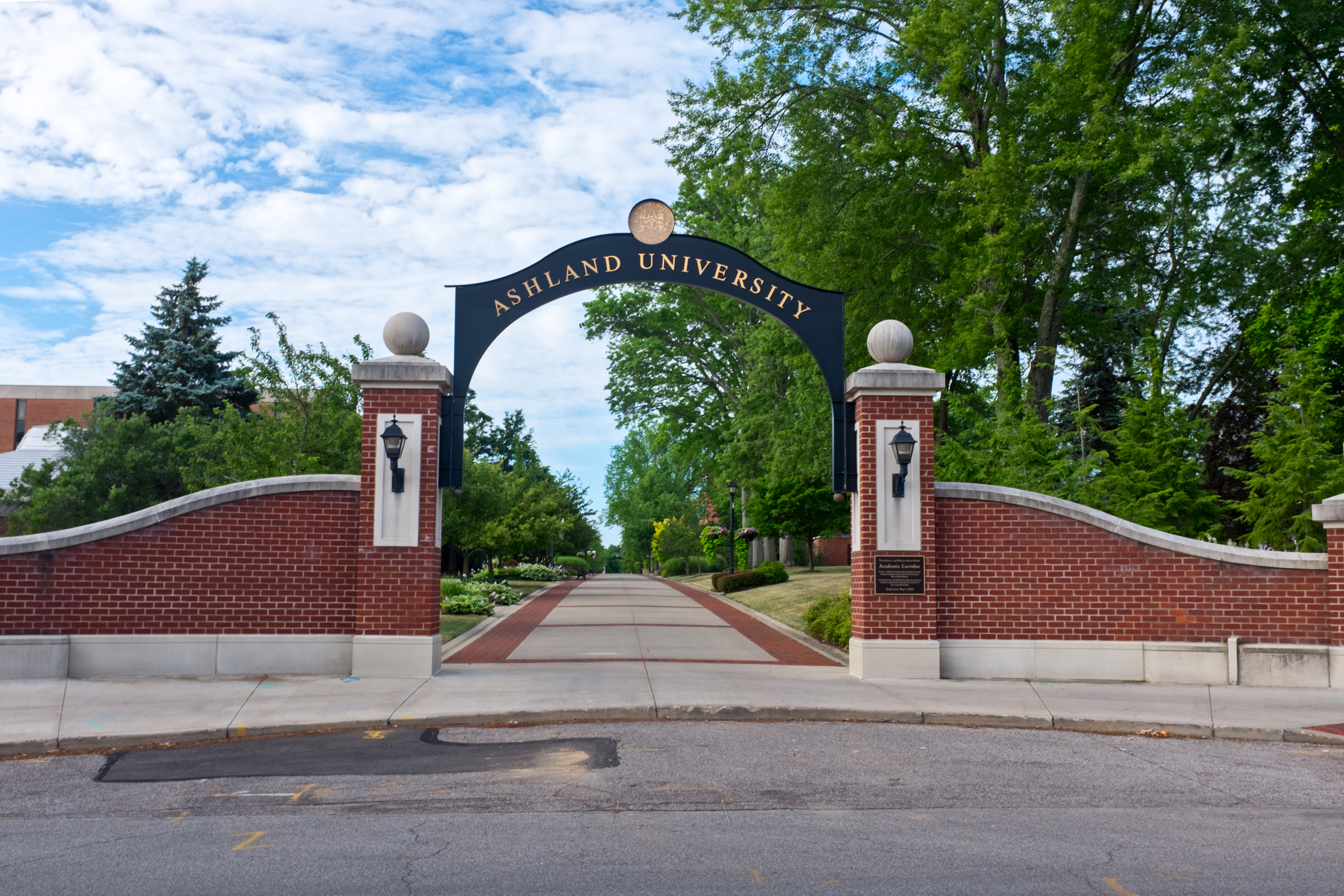

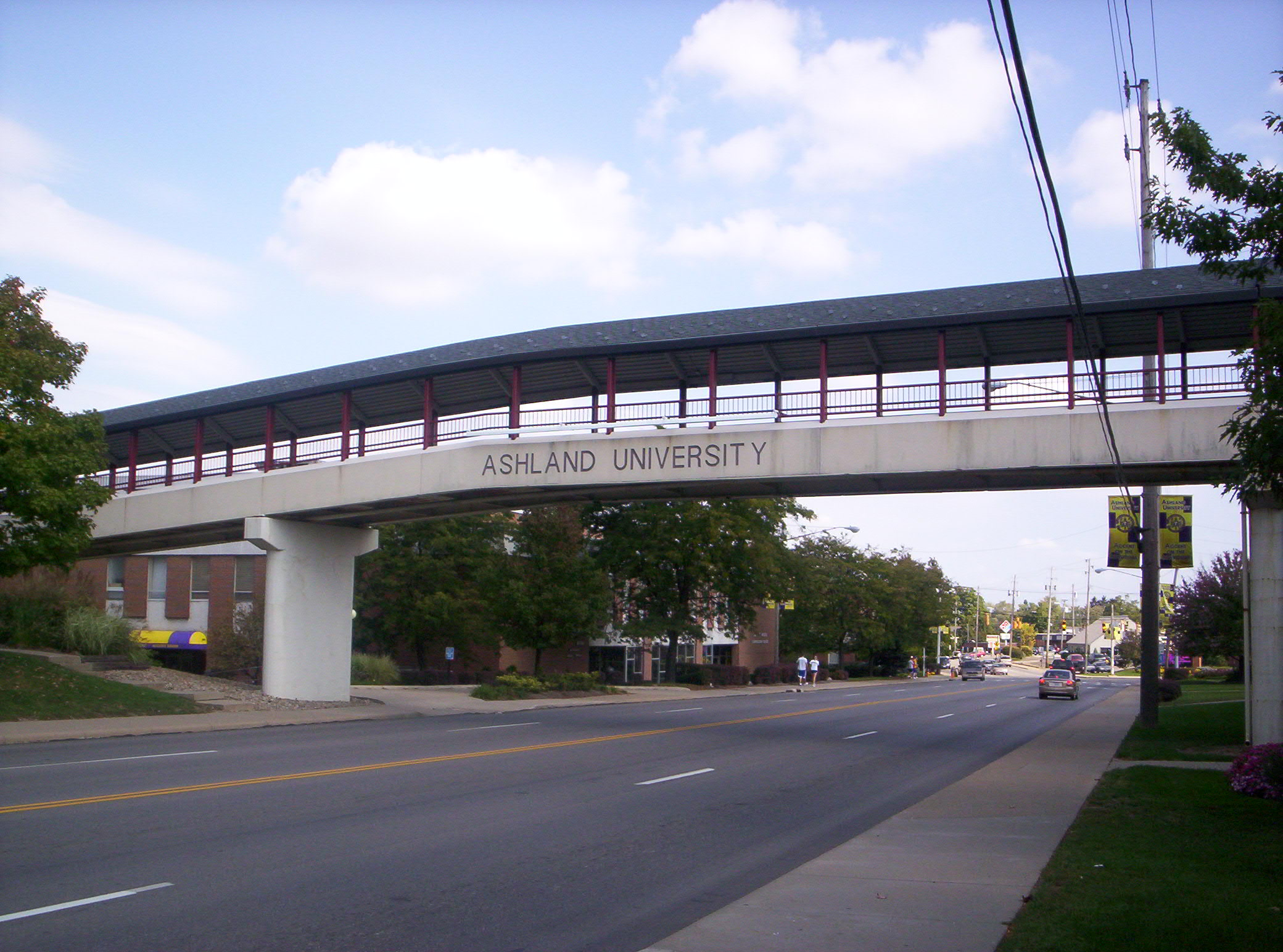

On May 28, 1877, a town meeting was held in Ashland, Ohio, where the citizens were to consider a proposal from members of the German Baptist Brethren Church to establish an institution of higher education. The Ashland Press reported that the citizens were promised the college would locate there if their city would raise $10,000. The church and community fundraising campaign proved to be a success and on Feb 17, 1878, a meeting was held to add up their campaign funds and make final plans. The success of the campaign was announced, the college was chartered on February 20 and a church-related, co-educational institution was established.

In April 1878, the board of trustees decided to purchase the "most desirable plot in town – 28 acres on the hill." The first buildings to be constructed were Founders Hall and Allen Hall, constructed from bricks made on the site. Classes opened at Ashland College on Sep 17, 1879, with somewhere around 60 students and eight faculty members.

The new institution grew slowly during its first few decades, but enrollment reached the 200 mark shortly after the turn of the century.

By 1905, Ashland College accepted its first international student from Russia.

By the 1950s, the college had added many new programs of study and experienced rapid growth from about 300 students to more than 2,500 in 1970.

By 1972, Ashland faced a financial crisis as a result of a decline in enrollment and stagnating economy. But shortly after this, several new programs, including a master of education and master of business administration, were created and a number of off-campus centers were developed.

In 1989, college officials decided to change the name of the institution to Ashland University. This change to university status reflected more accurately what the institution had become, with total student enrollment around the 5,600 mark and almost evenly divided between graduate and undergraduate students.

Progress has continued on campus since the 1980s with the construction of several new academic buildings, a new Recreation Center, Student Center and Athletic Complex and the Jack W. Liebert Military and Veterans Center. In addition, in 2010, the university acquired MedCentral Health System's College of Nursing in Mansfield and began a campaign to raise money to construct the 49,000 sq ft (4,600 m^{2}) Dwight Schar College of Nursing and Health Sciences in Mansfield. The building opened for classes on June 20, 2014.

== Academics ==
=== College of Arts and Sciences ===
The academic programs of the College of Arts and Sciences are housed in seven buildings across the campus. The Kettering Science Center, home to the Departments of Biology/Toxicology and Chemistry/Geology/Physics, was renovated and expanded in 2006 and includes laboratories and specialized equipment rooms for teaching and research in biological, computer, and physical sciences as well as a 2,500-square-foot (230 m^{2}) greenhouse. The Center for the Arts includes the Hugo Young Theatre, studio theatre, Don Coburn Art Gallery, studios for WRDL-FM and TV-20, the Elizabeth Pastor Recital Hall, and is home to the Departments of Art, Music, Theatre and Communication Arts. The Center for the Humanities in Bixler Hall houses the Departments of English, Philosophy, Foreign Languages, the Writing Studio, and the Ashland Center for Nonviolence. The Department of Religion is in the Rinehart Center for Religious Studies. Patterson Technology Center houses the Department of Mathematics and Computer Science as well as the Office of Information Technology. Andrews Hall is home to the Department of History/Political Science. Criminal Justice/Sociology, Social Work and Psychology are located within the Dwight Schar College of Education.

WRDL (88.9 FM) is an educational radio station broadcasting a Contemporary hit radio format. Licensed to Ashland, Ohio, USA, the station serves the North-Central Ohio area. The station is owned and operated by Ashland University.

=== Dauch College of Business and Economics ===
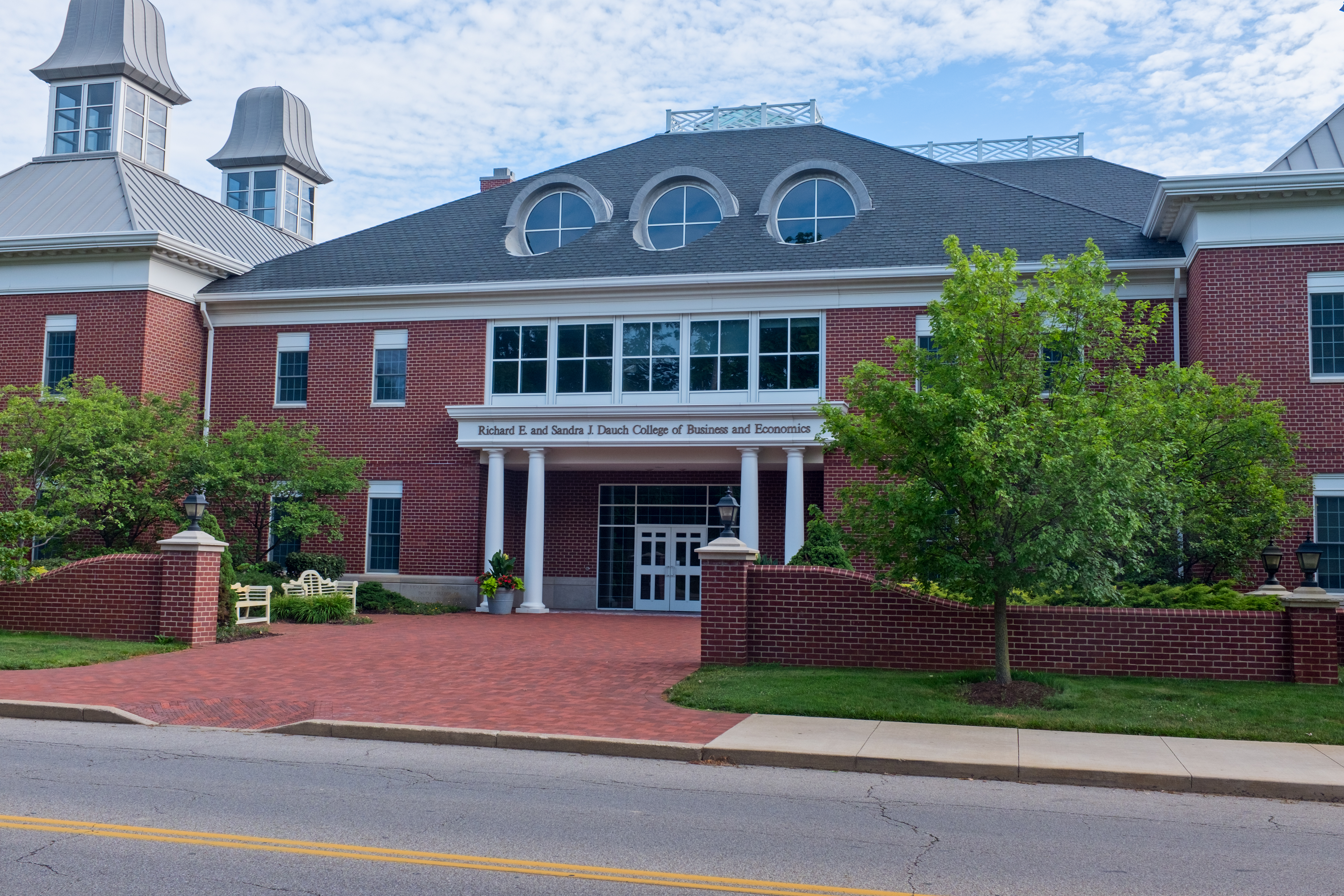

The Richard E. and Sandra J. Dauch College of Business and Economics building, which includes the Burton D. Morgan Center for Free Enterprise and Entrepreneurship wing, opened for classes in January 2004. This 60,000-square-foot (5,600 m^{2}) building serves as the home for business administration, supply chain management, economics and MBA programs and features a trading room with Wall Street-style workstations and wall-mounted displays with market news for Ashland University's Eagle Investment Group, an executive education center, computer labs, tiered lecture hall and product development lab.

=== Dwight Schar College of Education ===
The two-story, 52,000-square-foot (4,800 m^{2}) Dwight Schar College of Education building opened in March 2006 and is home to the undergraduate teacher education program as well as the master of education program and doctor of education program. The building features 12 classrooms, four seminar rooms, 60 faculty and staff offices, several commons or meeting areas, a media center, peer teaching studio with one-way viewing mirror and 165-seat lecture hall. The building's two-way interactive distance learning capability allows the college to do live broadcasts from several locations inside the facility.

Ashland's education program is accredited by the Council for the Accreditation of Educator Preparation (CAEP) and received full accreditation at the initial-licensure level and accreditation with stipulations at the advanced level. Approval to offer the Master of Education degree was granted by the Ohio Board of Regents in 1975. Approval for offering certification for the Master of Education degree was granted by the Ohio Department of Education in 1976. Additionally, licensure and endorsement programs are approved by the Ohio Department of Education.

=== Dwight Schar College of Nursing & Health Sciences ===
The Ashland University College of Nursing evolved from a hospital-based diploma program that was established in 1919 by the Mansfield General Hospital.

Founded in 1997 under MedCentral and acquired by Ashland University in 2010, the College of Nursing is a private institution of higher education offering programs of study leading to the baccalaureate degree in nursing.

Ashland University completed a $15.5 million campaign to build a 46,000-square-foot academic building for the new Dwight Schar College of Nursing and Health Science in Mansfield. The campaign received a $5 million lead gift from Ashland University alumnus and longtime supporter Dwight Schar.

Groundbreaking for the Dwight Schar College of Nursing took place on June 16, 2011. The new facility includes a number of clinical laboratories housed within the Simulation Center, including a Health Foundations lab, Family Health lab, Adult Health lab, Complex Health lab, ICU/CCU/NICU, Advanced Care lab, Community Health Home Care lab, and four patient examination labs. Other spaces in the building include traditional classrooms, faculty/staff offices, student study and lounge areas, and student support spaces.

The building opened for fall nursing classes on August 20, 2012, and a dedication and ribbon cutting ceremony took place on October 12, 2012. Ashland University nursing students complete their first two years of the program on the Ashland University campus in Ashland and then move to the Mansfield campus for the last two years of education and clinical studies. Growth of the program has included a Doctor of Nursing Practice degree and a Physician's Assistant program.

== Accreditation ==
Ashland University is accredited by the Higher Learning Commission and is authorized by the Ohio Board of Regents to grant bachelor's, master's and doctoral degrees. Individual programs are accredited by the Association to Advance Collegiate Schools of Business (AACSB), the Association of Collegiate Business Schools and Programs (ACBSP), the Council for the Accreditation of Counseling and Related Educational Programs (CACREP), the Accreditation Council for Education in Nutrition and Dietetics (ACEND), the Council for the Accreditation of Educator Preparation (CAEP), the Commission on Collegiate Nursing Education (CCNE), the Accreditation Review Commission on Education for the Physician Assistant (ARC-PA), the Commission on Accrediting of The Association of Theological Schools (ATS), and the Council on Social Work Education (CSWE). The chemistry program is approved by the American Chemical Society.

== Rankings ==
U.S. News & World Report ranked Ashland University #37 in Regional Universities Midwest in the 2025 edition of its America's Best Colleges survey. That same year it was also ranked #36 in Best Value Schools, #20 in Best Colleges for Veterans and #41 in Top Performers on Social Mobility.

U.S. News & World Report ranked Ashland University #159 in Best Online MBA Programs in the 2025 edition of its America's Best Colleges survey.

U.S. News & World Report ranked Ashland University #234-258 in Best Education Schools in the 2025 edition of its Best Education Schools survey.

== Student Life ==
The university enrolls 6,200 students, 80 percent of whom are undergraduate students. Seventy-nine percent of graduates are employed or pursuing further education six months after graduation. Ninety-nine percent of first-time, full-time freshmen receive some kind of financial aid.

=== Greek organizations ===
==== Fraternities ====
- Phi Delta Theta
- Phi Kappa Psi
- Kappa Sigma

==== Sororities ====
- Alpha Delta Pi
- Delta Zeta
- Alpha Phi
- Theta Phi Alpha

== Faculty ==
There are nearly 150 full-time faculty, and 80% hold the highest degree in their field. The student to faculty ratio is 13:1.

== Athletics ==
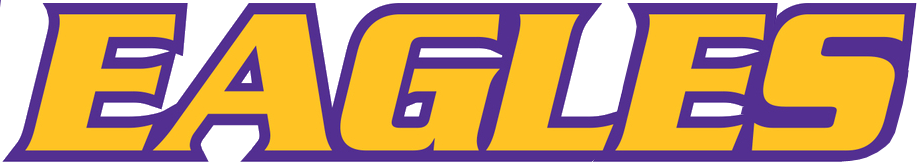
Ashland athletics wordmark

Ashland University participates in NCAA Division II for athletics. Ashland's athletic teams are known as the Eagles, and the colors are purple and gold. Ashland participates in the Great Midwest Athletic Conference (G-MAC) since the 2021–22 academic year. They formerly had competed in the Great Lakes Intercollegiate Athletic Conference (GLIAC) from 1995–96 to 2020–21; and before that they were a charter member of the American Mideast Conference of the National Association of Intercollegiate Athletics (NAIA) on three different tenures.

== Centers ==
- Ashland Theological Seminary (ATS), a graduate division of Ashland University, is an evangelical seminary located in Ashland, Ohio, with extension campuses in Cleveland and Columbus.
- Ashbrook Center for Public Affairs is an academic center at Ashland University, dedicated by Ronald Reagan on May 9, 1983. One emphasis of the center is promoting the study of American history, government, politics, and constitutional interpretation for young people, teachers, and scholars. The Ashbrook Center was established and named in honor of the late Congressman John M. Ashbrook (1928–1982) who represented Ohio's 17th Congressional district for 21 years. Ashbrook was an American politician of the Republican Party who served in the United States House of Representatives from Ohio from 1961 until his death.

== Magazine ==
- Accent is published for alumni, parents and friends of Ashland University. Compiled by AU's Public Relations Office in cooperation with the Office of Alumni Relations, Accent is designed by Graphic Design Services and printed by Printing Services.

== Newspaper ==
- The Collegian
