= XHBE-FM =

Radio station in Perote, Veracruz

- El Progreso/Perote, Veracruz; Mexico
- Frequency: 88.9 FM
- Branding: La Invasora

Programming
- Format: Grupera

Ownership
- Owner: Molina Comunicaciones; (Raúl César and Luis Manuel Molina Ovando)

History
- First air date: September 10, 1971 (concession)

Technical information
- Licensing authority: CRT
- Class: B1
- ERP: 0.101 kW
- HAAT: 1,483 meters (4,865 ft)
- Transmitter coordinates: 19°31′30″N 97°07′42″W

Links
- Website: lainvasora889.com

XHBE-FM is a radio station on 88.9 FM in Perote, Veracruz. It is owned by Molina Comunicaciones and is known as La Invasora with a grupera format.

== History ==
XEBE-AM 1160 received its concession on September 10, 1971. It broadcast as a daytimer with 1,000 watts. In 1994, the station was transferred to Lila Ovando Álvarez Vda. de Molina, who died, and then to her heirs, the current concessionaires. It also boosted power to 5,000 watts and began broadcasting at night with 250 watts.

In 2010, XEBE was cleared to migrate to FM as XHBE-FM 88.9.
