= XHIZM-FM =

Radio station in Izúcar de Matamoros, Puebla, Mexico

- Izúcar de Matamoros, Puebla; Mexico
- Frequency: 88.9 FM
- Branding: La Revolucionaria

Programming
- Format: Cultural

Ownership
- Owner: Fundación General Francisco Hernández Domínguez, A.C.

History
- First air date: November 18, 2019
- Call sign meaning: "Izúcar de Matamoros"

Technical information
- Class: A
- ERP: 2 kW
- HAAT: -47 meters
- Transmitter coordinates: 18°35′03.26″N 98°27′14.7″W

Links
- Webcast: Listen live
- Website: larevolucionaria.mx

XHIZM-FM is a noncommercial cultural radio station on 88.9 FM in Izúcar de Matamoros, Puebla, Mexico, known as La Revolucionaria.

== History ==
On September 6, 2013, Fundación General Francisco Hernández Domínguez, A.C., applied for a new permit FM station at Izúcar de Matamoros. The application was approved by the Federal Telecommunications Institute on November 28, 2018. XHIZM-FM signed on November 18, 2019.
