= XHPGVS-FM =

Radio station in Guasave, Sinaloa, Mexico

- Guasave, Sinaloa; Mexico
- Frequency: 88.9 MHz
- Branding: La Ke Buena

Programming
- Format: Regional Mexican
- Affiliations: Radiópolis

Ownership
- Owner: GPM Grupo Promomedios; (GPM Grupo Promomedios Mazatlán, S.A. de C.V.)

History
- First air date: September 2018
- Call sign meaning: "Guasave, Sinaloa"

Technical information
- Licensing authority: CRT
- Class: B1
- ERP: 25.029 kW
- HAAT: 37.2 m (122 ft)
- Transmitter coordinates: 25°34′52.2″N 108°27′59.3″W

Links
- Webcast: Listen live
- Website: gpmportal.com

XHPGVS-FM is a radio station on 88.9 FM in Guasave, Sinaloa, Mexico. It is owned by Grupo Promomedios and carries the La Ke Buena Regional Mexican format from Radiópolis.

== History ==
XHPGVS was awarded in the IFT-4 radio auction of 2017 and came to air in September 2018.
