= WMPR =

Jackson, Mississippi; United States
- Frequency: 90.1 MHz

Programming
- Format: Variety

Ownership
- Owner: J.C. Maxwell Broadcasting Group, Inc.

History
- First air date: 1983
- Call sign meaning: Mississippi Public Radio (originally an NPR member station until 1986)

Technical information
- Licensing authority: FCC
- Facility ID: 29552
- Class: C1
- ERP: 100,000 watts
- HAAT: 137 meters (449 ft)
- Transmitter coordinates: 32°11′33.00″N 90°5′28.00″W

Links
- Public license information: Public file; LMS
- Website: wmprfm.com

WMPR (90.1 FM) is a radio station broadcasting a variety format. WMPR is a community station which specializes in gospel and blues but also features other forms of music as well as several community-oriented talk shows. Licensed to Jackson, Mississippi, United States, the station serves the Jackson area. The station is currently owned by J.C. Maxwell Broadcasting Group, Inc.

Its studios are located in Jackson, west of downtown, and the transmitter site is in Florence, Mississippi.

== History ==
For more than a decade, Mississippi had just one public radio station: WNJC-FM in Senatobia, Mississippi. Seeking to change this, the J.C. Maxwell Broadcasting Group—named for James Clerk Maxwell, discoverer of electromagnetic radiation—was formed in early 1981 to pursue the construction of a new noncommercial educational station in Jackson. Maxwell proposed a new full-service outlet with a focus on news and information, as well as an affiliation with NPR.

The Federal Communications Commission (FCC) granted the construction permit on January 28, 1982. By that time, Maxwell had already lined up grant monies from the Corporation for Public Broadcasting, the National Telecommunications and Information Administration, and the Communications Improvement Trust, which held money from the interim operator of WLBT, Communications Improvement, Inc. Studios were constructed on the campus of Tougaloo College, while the station set a musical format focusing on jazz and blues.

WMPR began broadcasting in October 1983, but it failed to attract the hoped-for support from listeners. The first general manager resigned after just six months, and by 1986, the station warned that it might not have sufficient funds to remain a member of NPR. A steadying hand would soon come to the station in the form of James Charles Evers, former mayor of Fayette and disc jockey in Philadelphia, Mississippi, and the brother of Medgar Evers, who became the general manager of WMPR by January 1990 and served in the post for more than 30 years. Prior to becoming a station employee, he had debated segregationist Richard Barrett on its air in 1988. Under Evers's management, per a historical marker erected on the Mississippi Blues Trail in 2009, WMPR became a "primary outlet" for blues in the area; Evers also hosted the weekly Let's Talk talk show.

The station was the subject of an attack in 2017 in which unknown vandals went to Evers's home and sprayed "KKK" on a station van. Evers died in 2020; after his death, the street on which WMPR's studios are located, Pecan Park Circle, was renamed in his honor. Majority ownership remained in the Evers family with his wife Wanda, who absorbed some of Charles's stake.
