= XHENS-FM =

Radio station in Navojoa, Sonora

- Navojoa, Sonora; Mexico
- Frequency: 88.9 FM
- Branding: La Zeta

Programming
- Format: Pop

Ownership
- Owner: Uniradio; (Promotora Radiovisión, S.A. de C.V.)

History
- First air date: August 31, 1960 (concession)
- Former frequencies: 1480 kHz (1960–2011), 107.1 MHz (2011–2020)
- Call sign meaning: Navojoa Sonora

Technical information
- Licensing authority: CRT
- Class: B1
- ERP: 3.140 kW
- HAAT: 296.2 m (972 ft)
- Transmitter coordinates: 27°04′29″N 109°28′06″W

Links
- Webcast: Listen live
- Website: uniradio.com/radio/navojoa/z889

XHENS-FM is a radio station on 88.9 FM in Navojoa, Sonora, Mexico. It is owned by Uniradio and is known as La Zeta.

== History ==
XENS-AM 1480 received its concession on August 31, 1960. The 1,000-watt station was owned by Juana María Infante. XENS was owned by Mayo Radio from 1993 until its 2005 sale to Uniradio. By the 2000s, XENS was operating with 5 kW day and 250 watts at night.

XENS migrated to FM in 2011 as XHENS-FM 107.1. XHENS moved to 88.9 MHz on March 23, 2020, as a condition of the renewal of its concession, in order to clear 106-108 MHz as much as possible for community and indigenous stations.
