= KRUC =

Radio station in Las Cruces, New Mexico

- Las Cruces, New Mexico; United States
- Frequency: 88.9 MHz
- Branding: Radio Cadena Manantial

Programming
- Format: Spanish

Ownership
- Owner: World Radio Network, Inc.

History
- Call sign meaning: Las KRUCes

Technical information
- Licensing authority: FCC
- Facility ID: 76906
- Class: A
- ERP: 500 watts
- HAAT: 60 meters (197 feet)
- Transmitter coordinates: 32°16′41″N 106°54′39″W

Links
- Public license information: Public file; LMS
- Website: KRUC website

KRUC (88.9 FM, "Radio Cadena Manantial") is a non-commercial radio station licensed to serve Las Cruces, New Mexico. The station is owned by World Radio Network, Inc. It airs an evangelical, interdenominational Spanish language Religious radio format.

The station was assigned the KRUC call letters by the Federal Communications Commission on April 18, 1987. The station is a simulcast of KVER-FM in El Paso, Texas.

== Translators ==
Call sign	Frequency	City of license	FID	ERP (W)	FCC info
K206BP	(89.1 FM) FM	Weslaco, TX	73761	197	LMS
K248AM	(97.5 FM) FM	McAllen, TX	76880	250	LMS
