= XHUACC-FM =

Radio station in Ciudad del Carmen, Campeche

- Ciudad del Carmen, Campeche, Mexico; Mexico
- Broadcast area: Campeche
- Frequency: 88.9 FM
- Branding: Radio Delfín

Programming
- Format: Mexican college

Ownership
- Owner: Universidad Autónoma del Carmen

History
- First air date: December 12, 2006
- Call sign meaning: Universidad Autónoma del Carmen Campeche

Technical information
- ERP: 10 kW

Links
- Webcast: stream.zeno.fm/4u09mv8m1k0uv
- Website: radiodelfin.com

XHUACC-FM is a Mexican college radio station owned by the Universidad Autónoma del Carmen.

== History ==
XHUACC received its permit in February 2006, and at 11:15pm on December 12, 2006, test transmissions began for the new station on 88.9 FM.
