= XHVSS-FM =

Radio station in Hermosillo, Sonora, Mexico

- Hermosillo, Sonora; Mexico
- Frequency: 101.1 FM
- Branding: @FM (Arroba FM)

Programming
- Format: English and Spanish contemporary hit radio

Ownership
- Owner: Grupo Radiorama; (La Súper de Hermosillo, S.A. de C.V.)
- Sister stations: XHESON-FM

History
- First air date: April 25, 1991 (concession); 2012 (FM)
- Former frequencies: 650 kHz
- Call sign meaning: "Villa de Seris, Sonora"

Technical information
- Licensing authority: CRT
- Class: B1
- ERP: 6.5 kW
- HAAT: 182.23 m (597.9 ft)
- Transmitter coordinates: 29°03′48″N 110°56′17″W

Links
- Webcast: Listen live
- Website: arroba.fm radioramasonora.com

XHVSS-FM is a radio station in Hermosillo, Sonora. Broadcasting on 101.1 FM, it is owned by Grupo Radiorama and carries its @FM English and Spanish contemporary hit radio format.

== History ==
XEVSS-AM 650 received its concession on April 25, 1991. Broadcasting from nearby Villa de Seris, XEVSS was owned by Radiorama and broadcast with 2.5 kW day, under a Regional Mexican format under the name "Morena 650". In 2002, the station was leased by Radio S.A. with its Radio 13 news/talk format, featuring programming from XEDA-AM in Mexico City.

In 2011, XEVSS was approved to migrate to FM, and XHVSS-FM 101.1 came to air the next year came under the operation of Grupo Larsa Comunicaciones, with a pop music format known as Sin Límites. In early 2014, it changed to romantic music as Romántica 101.1; the format lasted four years until August 2018, when it flipped to a Regional Mexican format under the name of La Más Chingona name.

The entire La Más Chingona format and intellectual unit was moved to Larsa-operated social station XHHER-FM on July 31, 2019; days later, XHVSS became La Ke Buena as part of the lead-up to operation by ISA Multimedia. ISA Multimedia ceased operations of its Hermosillo cluster on December 31, 2021. On January 15, 2022, the station changed to the Arroba FM format from Radiorama itself; that same day, XHESON-FM became La Poderosa.
