= WLRY =

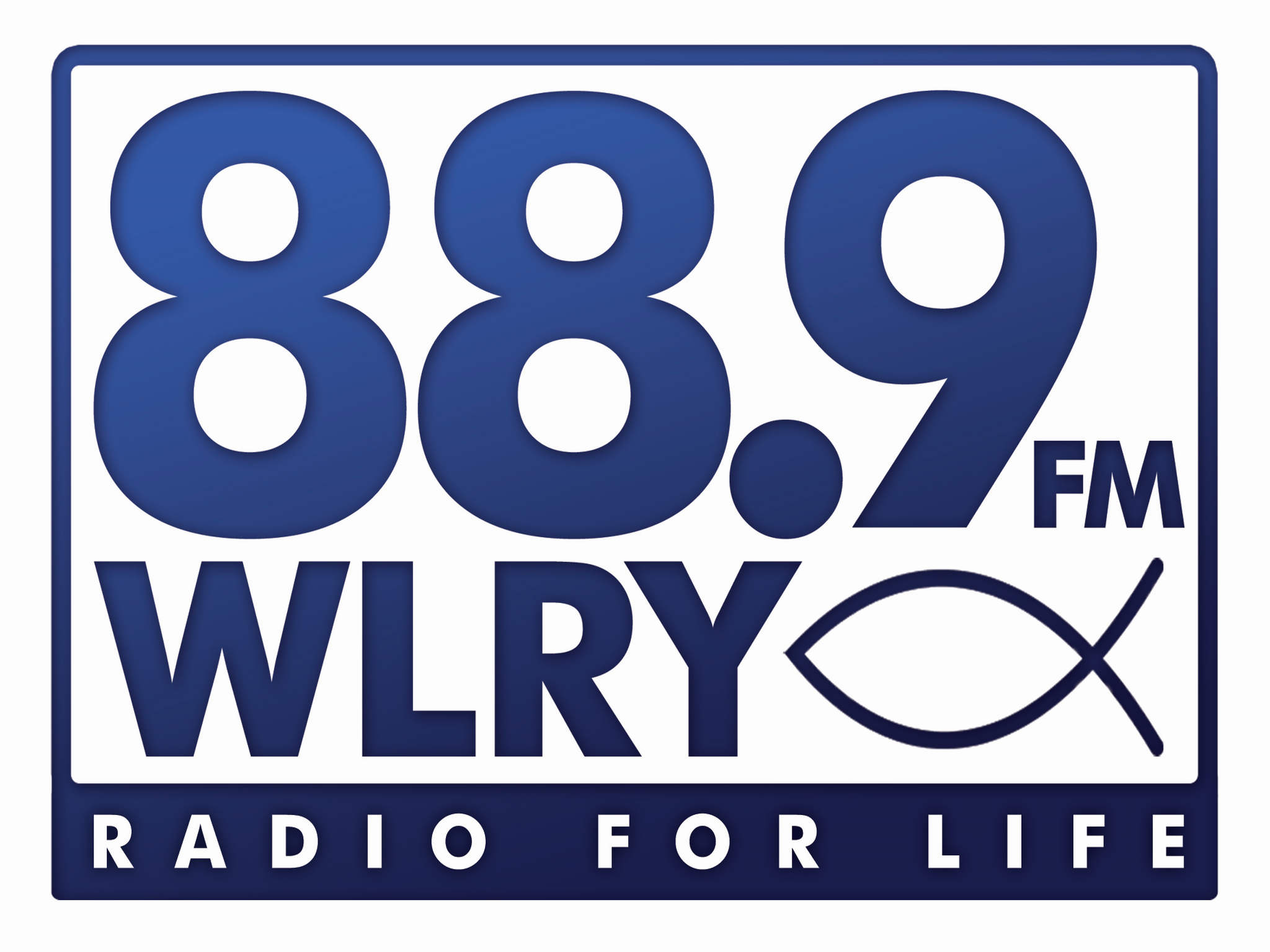
- Rushville, Ohio; United States
- Broadcast area: Columbus, Ohio
- Frequency: 88.9 MHz

Programming
- Format: Contemporary Christian Christian Rock

Ownership
- Owner: Spirit Communications Inc.; (Radio U)
- Sister stations: WUFM,

History
- First air date: 1999
- Call sign meaning: Where Music is Going

Technical information
- Licensing authority: FCC
- Facility ID: 86826
- Class: A
- ERP: 4,200 watts
- HAAT: 91 meters (299 ft)
- Transmitter coordinates: 39°46′41.00″N 82°25′26.00″W

Links
- Public license information: Public file; LMS
- Website: Https://radiou.com

WLRY (88.9 FM) is a non-commercial radio station licensed to serve Rushville, Ohio, United States. The station, established in 1999, is owned by the Arcangel Broadcasting Foundation, a 501(c)(3) non-profit organization. WLRY currently airs a Contemporary Christian format of music and talk under the slogan "Radio for Life".

== Programming ==
WLRY broadcasts a Christian radio format featuring Christian talk and educational programs plus contemporary Christian music to the greater Columbus, Ohio, area. Local programming includes a weekday morning show called O'Riley in the Morning featuring Mike O'Riley with music, local information and special guests. Syndicated programming includes Focus on the Family The Urban Alternative with Tony Evans, Turning Point with David Jeremiah, and the drama/comedy Adventures in Odyssey.

== History ==
This station received its original construction permit from the Federal Communications Commission on May 19, 1998. The new station was assigned the WLRY call sign by the FCC on June 22, 1998. WLRY received its license to cover from the FCC on December 7, 1999.

WLRY 88.5 logo

In August 2005, WLRY applied to the FCC to change its licensed broadcast frequency from 88.5 MHz to 88.9 MHz in an effort to improve the coverage area of its signal. The FCC granted the station a new construction permit to authorize this change on February 16, 2006. WLRY received a license to cover these changes on December 14, 2006.

== Awards and honors ==
WLRY received the Christian Radio Station Of The Year Award from The Ohio Christian Music Association on August 6, 2017.
