= KNBE =

- Beatrice, Nebraska; United States
- Frequency: 88.9 MHz

Programming
- Format: Religious

Ownership
- Owner: Family Worship Center Church

Technical information
- Licensing authority: FCC
- Facility ID: 106561
- Class: C3
- ERP: 7,500 watts
- HAAT: 146 meters (479 ft)
- Transmitter coordinates: 40°33′3″N 96°38′45″W

Links
- Public license information: Public file; LMS
- Website: http://sonlifetv.com

KNBE (88.9 FM) is a radio station licensed to Beatrice, Nebraska, United States. The station is currently owned by Family Worship Center Church.
