= WHEY =

- North Muskegon, Michigan; United States
- Broadcast area: Muskegon, Michigan
- Frequency: 88.9 MHz
- Branding: "Hey 88.9"

Programming
- Format: Christian alternative rock

Ownership
- Owner: Muskegon Community Radio Broadcast Company

History
- First air date: 2008
- Call sign meaning: "Hey"

Technical information
- Licensing authority: FCC
- Class: A
- ERP: 1,000 watts
- HAAT: 48 meters (157 ft)
- Transmitter coordinates: 43°16′45″N 86°20′32.2″W

Links
- Public license information: Public file; LMS
- Webcast: Listen live
- Website: www.heyradio.com

WHEY (88.9 FM, "Hey 88.9") is a non-commercial educational radio station licensed to serve North Muskegon, Michigan, United States. The station is owned and operated by Muskegon Community Radio Broadcast Company.

WHEY broadcasts a Christian alternative rock music format serving the Muskegon, Michigan, area.

== History ==
This station received its original construction permit from the Federal Communications Commission on June 4, 2008. The new station was assigned the call letters WHEY by the FCC on June 20, 2008. WHEY received its license to cover from the FCC on November 25, 2008.
