= WMCX =

Coordinates: 40.2790°N 74.0068°W

- United States
- Broadcast area: West Long Branch, NJ
- Frequencies: 88.9 MHz, FM band
- Branding: "The X 88.9"

Programming
- Format: College Radio, Alternative Rock

Ownership
- Owner: Monmouth University

History
- First air date: May 2, 1974

Technical information
- Licensing authority: FCC
- Class: Class A
- ERP: 500 watts horiz 1,000 watts vert
- HAAT: 36 meters

Links
- Public license information: Public file; LMS
- Webcast: http://real.monmouth.edu:8080/;
- Website: www.monmouth.edu/department-of-communication/student-organizations/88-9-wmcx/

WMCX (88.9 FM, The X 88.9) is a New Jersey college radio station with an Alternative Rock format. The studios and production facilities are located at Monmouth University in West Long Branch, New Jersey.

== History ==
WMCX began broadcasting on 88.1 MHz from Monmouth University on May 2, 1974. At 10 watts, the station could only be heard within a radius of 2–3 miles. In September 17, 1987, the station moved to 88.9 MHz and increased its power to 1,000 watts. Today, the station has a broadcast radius of approximately 15 miles, serving towns in Monmouth and Ocean counties in New Jersey. The station has more than 500,000 listeners both domestically and internationally thanks largely to the "listen live" streaming radio feature on their official web site. This feature enables listeners to tune into the station from anywhere in the world at any time. In addition to its music programming, WMCX also has news department and also airs the college's football, basketball, and baseball games.

WMCX went on the air on May 2, 1974 as 88.1 FM, a 10 watt station. On March 29, 1984: A fire destroyed the station and remained off the air for nearly a year until reopening on March 6, 1985. On June 26, 1986 the station applied to the FCC for a new frequency and power. That approval came on September 17, 1987 for a 1000 watt station, broadcasting at 88.9 MHz.

The station launched streaming audio from its website on November 13, 1999. In the Fall of 2002 the station relocated to the Jules L. Plangere Jr. Center for Communication and Instructional Technology on campus.

On September 3, 2017, WMCX changed its slogan from "Throwbacks When You Want It, New Music When You Need It" to "Rockin' the Shore Since '74."
