= WRDL =

- Ashland, Ohio; United States
- Broadcast area: North-Central Ohio
- Frequency: 88.9 MHz
- Branding: More Music, More You!

Programming
- Format: College

Ownership
- Owner: Ashland University

History
- First air date: 1966

Technical information
- Licensing authority: FCC
- Facility ID: 2933
- Class: A
- ERP: 3,000 watts
- HAAT: 52.0 meters
- Transmitter coordinates: 40°51′41.00″N 82°19′11.00″W

Links
- Public license information: Public file; LMS
- Website: wrdlfm.com

WRDL (88.9 FM) is a non-commercial educational radio station licensed to Ashland, Ohio. The station serves the North-Central Ohio area and is the only radio station located within the city limits of Ashland. The station is owned and operated by Ashland University (formerly Ashland College). Its studios are located in the Center for The Arts building (formerly Arts & Humanities, or A&H). The transmitter and its antenna are located in the top floor of the library.

WRDL is Ashland University's award-winning, student-run radio station, broadcasting the best music, local news, sports, and information to 10 counties across North-Central Ohio on 88.9 FM and streaming live to any device online at www.wrdlfm.com. WRDL is certified by the Intercollegiate Broadcasting System (IBS) and is a member of the Ohio Association of Broadcasters (OAB). WRDL supports the academic mission of the Journalism & Digital Media Department (JDM) at Ashland University. For information about JDM, visit www.ashland.edu/journalism-and-digital-media-department.

== History ==
WRDL began broadcasting from tiny studios in a former projection booth for a theater in Founder's Hall in 1966. Originally at 88.1 on the dial, the 10-watt station's transmitter was located atop Clayton Hall, the tallest dormitory on the campus. Later the frequency was moved to 89.5 to avoid conflicts with other nearby non-commercial educational stations. In the 1980s the power was increased to 3,000 watts, and the station dial position was moved to 88.9. The transmitter was moved atop the new campus library building.

The station gets its call letters from the initials of Richard Dean Leidy, an adjunct professor that founded the radio/television department, at what was then called Ashland College. He always modestly insisted the letters stood for "Radio Department Laboratory." Leidy led the department from 1960 to 1988, when he retired. Most students were seeking majors or minors in the AC Speech Department.

The earliest equipment consisted of a Collins tube-type control board and two 16-inch transcription turntables of 1950's vintage. Additional tube-type equipment caused frequent high temperatures in the tiny control room without air-conditioning. In the earliest days, the station signed off in the summer, and only broadcast during the September to June school year.

In the mid-1960s some of the earliest student DJs consisted of Charles Beekley, Tom Warner, Mike Rogers and Craig Whitmore. They were quickly joined by Les Bagley, Tony "Z" Zabilski, Pat Murray, Ken Krauss, Jay Pappas, Mark Koontz and Will Ruch and others. Even with only 10 watts, the station became very popular in the community and student DJs were invited to do "record hops" at area high schools, and to appear at community events. One of the most visible was the annual three-day remote broadcast from a downtown tent to promote donations to benefit the American Cancer Society.

Charles G. (Charlie) Beekley graduated in 1966 and was hired as Mr. Leidy's first assistant instructor. "CGB," as he was familiarly known, was succeeded in the early 70s by others including Jay Pappas. Early guest lecturers included Eric Severeid of CBS News and Byron MacGregor, news director of the then highly popular CKLW Radio.

The school began offering Radio/Television as a major in the late-1960s when facilities were modernized and expanded with a move to custom designed facilities in the new Arts & Humanities Building. New studio equipment included a state-of-the-art Altec Lansing audio board and other late model radio gear as well as a well-equipped television production studio and control room. A United Press International news teletype was installed and Les Bagley was appointed the station's first designated student News Director. WRDL and ACTV2 newscasts were simulcast, and along with some other campus-originated programming (including remote broadcasts from the Ashland County Fair and live coverage of City Council meetings) were used as "local content" on the city's Armstrong Cable television system. WRDL programming was also simulcast on AM through a low-power carrier-current system that transmitted through the campus power lines.

In the early 1970s, the station's personalities included Gary Fletcher, Dean Dallman, Don King, Marty Larsen, "Kirk the Jerk" Fegley and Scott Rankin's "Get Up and Go Show." Later in the 70s and early 80s, the station's music hosts included Tripp Rogers, Bob Spence, Mark Miller, John Hager, Mike Marchinuke, Pete Moore, John (the Bear) Carroll, Doug Kurkul, Mike Parker, Michelle Temple, Tim (Shadow) Morris, Keith Connors, BJ McCurdy, Blair Mintz, Jeff France, and Ed Vogt. A Spanish-language show on Sundays was hosted by Jose Diaz. During this time, the station was called FM89, and later 89-Plus. The Sunday Night Special, which ran once a week for two hours, featured a different recording artist each week. Among the artists highlighted on the Sunday Night Special programs were Pink Floyd, Bob Seger, Todd Rundgren, the Doobie Brothers, Chicago, Yes, Heart, Billy Joel, Paul McCartney, and many other of the era's most popular rock acts. Airing immediately after the Sunday Night Special was an hour-long disco program, hosted by Adolph Santorine. The station also offered a weekly program featuring jazz, hosted by Mark Buchan.

Jay Pappas was the faculty member responsible for WRDL radio for many of these years, and Larry Hiner for WRDL television. Bill Clinger was responsible for equipment maintenance and broadcast technical matters.

In 1993, student staff Georgia Wentler (PD), Jeff "Jones" Putz (CD) and Jennifer Brewer (MD) adopted the nickname "The Eagle," in an effort to create an identity for the station. Putz said at the time he got the idea from a Philadelphia radio station seen in the trade publication Radio & Records. The name references the university's mascot, the Eagles. This nickname quit being used sometime around 2010.

Starting in the fall of 2000 there was a once a semester live broadcast called "Eagle Fest." The broadcast would feature 3-4 local bands and was broadcast live from the Eagle's Nest on the University's campus. Bands featured included Yellow No. 5, Northern Lights, Sindust and American Rockstar. One broadcast was even simulcast on TV-2. The concert series ran until Spring of 2003.
