= KYMR-FM =

- Metlakatla, Alaska; United States
- Frequency: 88.9 MHz
- Branding: KYMR 88.9FM

Ownership
- Owner: Annette Islands School District

History
- Call sign meaning: K Yellow Mountain Radio

Technical information
- Licensing authority: FCC
- Facility ID: 183685
- Class: D
- ERP: 50 watts
- HAAT: −64 metres (−210 ft)
- Transmitter coordinates: 55°07′41″N 131°34′26″W

Links
- Public license information: Public file; LMS
- Webcast: Listen Live
- Website: Official Website

KYMR-FM (88.9 FM) is a radio station licensed to serve the community of Metlakatla, Alaska. The station is owned by the Annette Islands School District.

The station was assigned the KYMR-FM call letters by the Federal Communications Commission on March 17, 2010.
