= KDUV =

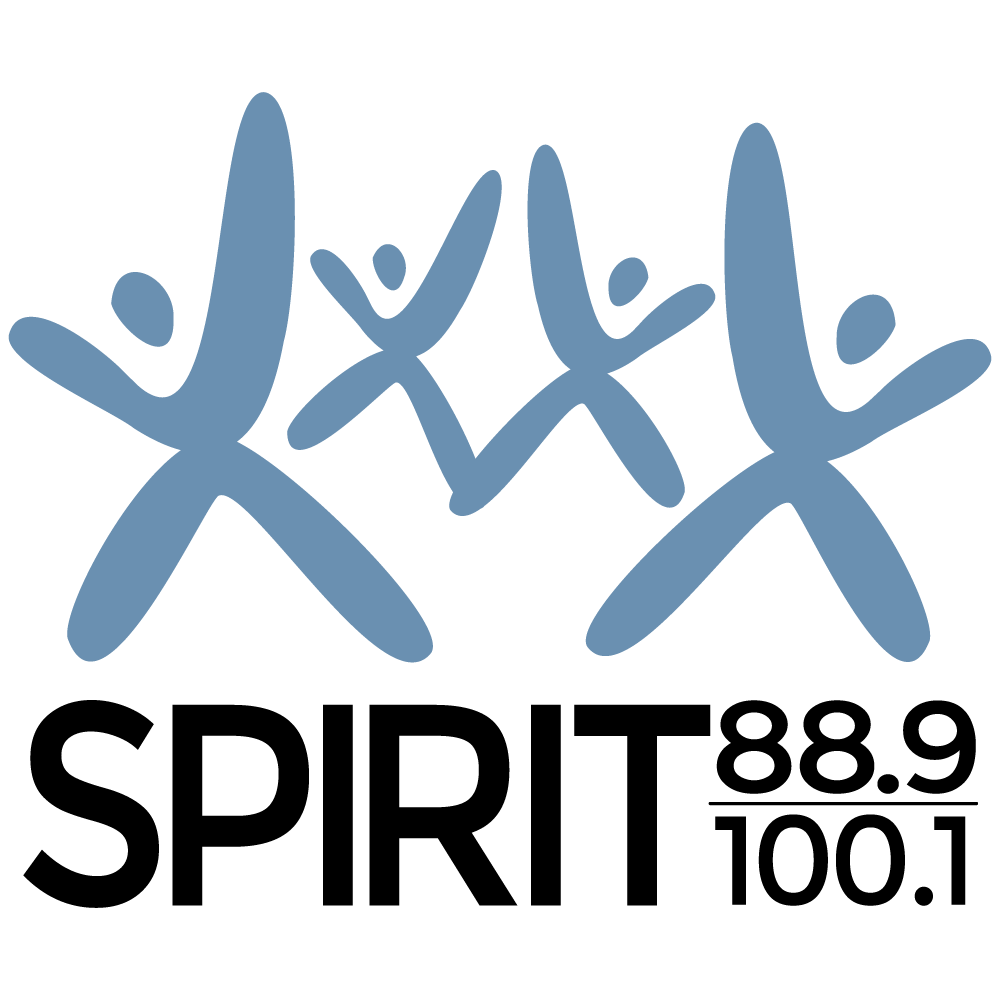
- Visalia, California; United States
- Broadcast area: Visalia, Tulare, Fresno, Bakersfield; Central California
- Frequency: 88.9 MHz
- Branding: Spirit 88.9 & 100.1 in Bakersfield

Programming
- Format: Contemporary Christian

Ownership
- Owner: Community Educational Broadcasting, Inc.

History
- First air date: February 1, 1991

Technical information
- Licensing authority: FCC
- Facility ID: 12912
- Class: B
- ERP: 1,000 watts
- HAAT: 807 meters (2,648 ft)
- Transmitter coordinates: 36°17′14.00″N 118°50′17.00″W
- Translator: 100.1 K261CO (Bakersfield)

Links
- Public license information: Public file; LMS
- Webcast: Listen live

KDUV (88.9 FM, "Spirit 88.9") is a non-commercial radio station licensed to Visalia, California, United States, and serving the Visalia, Tulare, Fresno and Bakersfield areas of Central California. Owned by Community Educational Broadcasting, Inc., it carries a contemporary Christian format. The studios and offices are on North Kelsey Street in Vislaia.

The transmitter is on Mountain Road 276 in Three Rivers, California. Programming is also broadcast on FM translator station K261CO (100.1 FM) in Bakersfield, California.

== History ==
The station signed on the air on February 1, 1991. Until December 26, 2010, KDUV was known on the air by its call letters, "KDUV-FM". Following a month of religious and secular Christmas music, the station re-branded as "Spirit 88.9" in late 2010.

== Programming ==
KDUV carries Brant Hansen in morning drive; other personalities include Amanda Carroll, Rob Anthony, and an evening program, "The Fairly Local Show" featuring Chad, Angela, and Jill. The station broadcasts Christian talk and teaching programs in the early morning.

On weekends, "Keep The Faith," a mix of music, interviews and listener participation airs Sunday mornings. A religious service from a local Visalia church is also broadcast on the station. On Sunday afternoons and evenings, Tom Collins and Justin Paul are heard.

== Translator ==
Broadcast translator for KDUV
Call sign	Frequency	City of license	FID	ERP (W)	Class	FCC info
K261CO	100.1 FM	Bakersfield, California	12914	38	D	LMS
