= WKTO =

- Edgewater, Florida; United States
- Broadcast area: Daytona Beach
- Frequency: 88.9 MHz

Programming
- Format: Christian radio

Ownership
- Owner: Mims Community Radio, Inc.

History
- First air date: 1998
- Call sign meaning: We Keep Telling Others

Technical information
- Licensing authority: FCC
- Facility ID: 42684
- Class: C2
- ERP: 25,000 watts
- HAAT: 120.4 meters (395 ft)
- Transmitter coordinates: 29°0′21.00″N 80°56′21.00″W
- Translator: 95.5 W238AM (Titusville)

Links
- Public license information: Public file; LMS
- Webcast: Listen Live
- Website: wkto.net

WKTO (88.9 FM) is a non-commercial radio station licensed to Edgewater, Florida, United States, and serving the Daytona Beach area. It airs a Christian format with a mix of preaching and Christian contemporary. WKTO is owned by Mims Community Radio, Inc. The studios and offices are on Old Mission Road in New Smyrna Beach.

WKTO's transmitter is sited on Florida State Road 44 at Omega Ranch Road in New Smyrna Beach. Programming is also heard over low-power FM translator W238AM at 95.5 MHz in Titusville.

== History ==
WKTO submitted an application to the Federal Communications Commission (FCC) in 1989. It received a construction permit but took nearly a decade to complete the work. It signed on the air in 1998.

In 1989, a Baptist church in Samsula volunteered the use of some of its land for a new taller tower. However, as time passed, the church's plans changed and the offer was withdrawn. A Christian businessman, Richard Crunkilton, offered his 20-acre (81,000 m^{2}) ranch for WKTO's tower. He sold the land in 2006.

Responding to a newspaper article, Dr. Bill Sharp invited the station to put a studio and control room in his Christian Life Center, then on Tenth Street, in New Smyrna Beach.

Former logo
