= KJIA =

Coordinates: 43°20′34″N 95°12′24″W

- Spirit Lake, Iowa; United States
- Broadcast area: Northwest Iowa - Southwest Minnesota
- Frequency: 88.9 MHz
- Branding: Kinship Christian Radio

Programming
- Format: Christian Radio

Ownership
- Owner: Minn-Iowa Christian Broadcasting, Inc.

History
- Call sign meaning: King Jesus Is Alive

Technical information
- Licensing authority: FCC
- Facility ID: 92473
- Class: C2
- ERP: 50,000 watts
- HAAT: 83 meters (272 ft)

Links
- Public license information: Public file; LMS
- Webcast: Listen live
- Website: kinshipradio.org/home

KJIA is a Christian radio station licensed to Spirit Lake, Iowa, broadcasting on 88.9 MHz. KJIA serves Northwest Iowa and Southwest Minnesota. The station is owned by Minn-Iowa Christian Broadcasting, Inc.
