= KCHG =

- Cedar City, Utah; United States
- Broadcast area: Cedar City - St. George
- Frequency: 88.9 MHz
- Branding: Crossover FM

Programming
- Format: Christian

Ownership
- Owner: Calvary Chapel Cedar City

History
- First air date: February 1, 2012

Technical information
- Licensing authority: FCC
- Facility ID: 174281
- Class: C1
- ERP: 6,700 watts
- HAAT: 794 meters (2,605 ft)
- Transmitter coordinates: 37°32′29″N 113°4′4″W
- Translator: (88.9 MHz) K205GE (Toquerville)

Links
- Public license information: Public file; LMS
- Webcast: Listen Live
- Website: www.crossoverfm.org

KCHG (88.9 FM) is a Christian radio station licensed to serve Cedar City, Utah, United States.

The station is currently owned by Calvary Chapel Cedar City.

== See also ==
- KAGJ
- KANN
