= WMSB (FM) =

American Family Radio station in Byhalia, Mississippi

- Byhalia, Mississippi; United States
- Frequency: 88.9 MHz

Programming
- Format: Christian
- Network: American Family Radio

Ownership
- Owner: American Family Association

History
- First air date: January 4, 1971
- Former call signs: WNJC-FM (1971–1992); WKNA (1992–2007)

Technical information
- Licensing authority: FCC
- Facility ID: 42060
- Class: C1
- ERP: 52,000 watts
- HAAT: 145 meters (476 ft)
- Transmitter coordinates: 34°39′30.4″N 89°37′32.3″W

Links
- Public license information: Public file; LMS
- Webcast: Listen live
- Website: afr.net

WMSB is a radio station on 88.9 FM licensed to Byhalia, Mississippi, United States. It is a full-time repeater of the American Family Radio (AFR) network and is owned by the American Family Association, broadcasting from a tower in Chulahoma.

Prior to being sold to AFR in 2007, this station was Mississippi's first public radio station as WNJC-FM, a service of Northwest Mississippi Junior College (NMJC) in Senatobia. After 16 years, the college shuttered the station in 1988 in order to reallocate its funds for classroom expenses. It was then acquired and operated for nearly two decades by WKNO-FM in Memphis, Tennessee.

== History ==
=== WNJC-FM ===
Northwest Mississippi Junior College applied on April 15, 1969, for a new noncommercial educational radio station to be located on the college campus. The application specified 89.9 MHz, but this was amended to 90.1 before being granted on January 28, 1970. A September 28 launch date was promoted, but this was missed, and WNJC-FM made its debut on January 4, 1971. Listeners to Mississippi's first noncommercial radio station heard music, news, and coverage of the college's athletic events. After resolving some issues that caused interference to television reception, the station was found eligible for Corporation for Public Broadcasting grants—and for membership in the new NPR. In addition, WNJC-FM also served as a training ground for student announcers and maintained a local news operation covering northern Mississippi; on one occasion, the news director was gathering a livestock report when they were chased by a bull. In 1976, the transmitter site was moved to a college-owned farm and the power increased to 18,000 watts. A construction permit was issued at the end of 1981 to move to 88.9 MHz.

Even though WNJC-FM had gone on the air in 1971, it was the only Mississippi-based public radio station for more than a decade. In the early 1980s, this began to change. The J. C. Maxwell Broadcasting Group was formed to build a minority-oriented public station in Jackson, which went on the air as WMPR in late 1983. Simultaneously, the Mississippi Authority for Educational Television began planning and securing funds for an eight-transmitter network to carry NPR programming across the state; the first seven transmitters in Public Radio Mississippi, comprising the entire network save Jackson, began that November.

=== Purchase by WKNO ===
In 1988, the community college opted to close WNJC-FM and reallocate its budget to classroom and curricular needs, effective August 1; the college's president called the decision "difficult". By November, the Memphis Community Television Foundation, parent of Memphis public radio station WKNO-FM, had filed to purchase the facility from NMJC.

Some changes were made in the WKNO-FM lineup coinciding with the integration of the new transmitter, with Performance Today and Monitoradio dropped to add Fresh Air. The station returned as a nearly full-time repeater of WKNO-FM on April 3, 1989; the only opt-outs from the parent station were to air normal programming while WKNO-FM aired Shelby County, Tennessee, commission and Memphis city council meetings. After initially contemplating a sale of the Senatobia station in 1991, WKNO-FM changed tactics and split daytime weekday programming, with WNJC-FM becoming WKNA and adding several new news and talk offerings. The next year, the WKNA audio was added to the Secondary Audio Program channel of WKNO television. The amount of talk programming was increased in 1996, at which time WKNQ in Dyersburg, Tennessee, also began airing the speech-based opt-outs. In 2003, this was changed to a fully separate service using NPR and BBC World Service programming.

=== Sale to AFA ===
WKNO, however, was frustrated in its efforts to pursue further facility improvements for WKNA and WKNQ in Dyersburg. As a result, at the end of 2006, it opted to sell both facilities, with Christian broadcasters purchasing each one. The Educational Media Foundation acquired the Dyersburg outlet, while WKNA was sold to the American Family Association of Tupelo for integration into its network. The sale closed on April 13, 2007, and the station was taken silent while it was relocated; Northwest Mississippi Community College, as the former junior college had renamed itself, had refused to allow AFA to use its tower site. WKNO earned $1 million from the sale of the two stations.

In 2008, AFA was approved to change the city of license from Senatobia to Byhalia, which allowed that city to retain one primary aural service as K-Love transmitter WKVF moved north toward Memphis.
