= KOFA (AM) =

Public radio station in Yuma, Arizona, United States

- Yuma, Arizona; United States
- Broadcast area: Yuma, Arizona; San Luis Río Colorado, Sonora
- Frequency: 1320 kHz
- Branding: Border Radio 94.7 FM - 1320 AM

Programming
- Language: English
- Format: Public Radio, Full service
- Affiliations: National Public Radio, Public Radio International, BBC World Service

Ownership
- Owner: Arizona Western College
- Sister stations: KAWC-FM

History
- First air date: September 6, 1959 (as KBLU)
- Former call signs: KBLU (1959–1970); KAWC (1970–2017)
- Call sign meaning: King OF Arizona silver mine

Technical information
- Licensing authority: FCC
- Facility ID: 2758
- Class: D
- Power: 730 watts day 106 watts night
- Transmitter coordinates: 32°41′22″N 114°30′0″W
- Translators: 94.7 MHz (K234CZ, Yuma)

Links
- Public license information: Public file; LMS
- Webcast: Listen Live music
- Website: borderradioaz.org

KOFA (1320 AM) is a public radio station airing a wide variety of music programs, along with a few news and talk programs. Licensed to Yuma, Arizona, United States, the station serves the Yuma, Arizona, United States and San Luis Río Colorado, Sonora, Mexico. The station is currently owned by Arizona Western College and features programming from National Public Radio, Public Radio International and the BBC World Service.

== History ==
1320 AM began life as the original KBLU, signing on September 6, 1959. When Eller Telecasting and Combined Communications merged in 1969, the newly formed group had to divest one of KBLU or KYUM at 560, choosing to keep the latter and donate the former to Arizona Western College. On January 1, 1970, the donation took effect, and 1320 AM signed off with the callsign changing to KAWC; 560 AM changed to KBLU.

Arizona Western College immediately relocated the transmitter to its campus and instituted a public radio format, which signed on for the first time on July 11, 1970.

In 2009, the K-Jazz Radio Network with its transmitters in northwestern and northern Arizona entered into agreement with Colorado River Public Media, by which those transmitters simulcast 1320 AM on weekdays.

The station changed its callsign to the current KOFA on July 13, 2017.
