= KUHN =

Radio station of the United Houma Nation in Golden Meadow, Louisiana

Golden Meadow, Louisiana; United States
- Frequency: 88.9 MHz

Programming
- Languages: French, English
- Format: Cajun, Zydeco, Swamp Pop

Ownership
- Owner: United Houma Nation Inc.

History
- First air date: November 1, 2011
- Last air date: January 2026

Technical information
- Licensing authority: FCC
- Facility ID: 173330
- Class: A
- ERP: 1,000 watts
- HAAT: 23 meters (75 ft)
- Transmitter coordinates: 29°20′53.8″N 90°14′55.2″W

Links
- Public license information: Public file; LMS
- Website: /www.unitedhoumanation.org/radio-station/

KUHN (88.9 FM) was a radio station broadcasting a variety format of oldies, swamp pop, zydeco, and talk radio related to the United Houma Nation in English and French. Licensed to Golden Meadow, Louisiana, United States, the station was owned by the United Houma Nation.

== History ==
This station was originally applied for by the tribe in October 2007 and was granted in January 2009. However, over the course of time between the issuance of the construction permit and the actual license, the station location, frequency, and power was reduced from 50 kW as was originally proposed at a HAAT of 49 meters (161 ft) and on a frequency of 89.5 Mhz from a location north of Port Fourchon, Louisiana, to the final licensed location at the United Houma Nation's Tribal office south of the city of Golden Meadow, Louisiana, with the antenna on a tower behind the tribe's office. The licensed was granted on September 30, 2011, and the station went on air at the start of November 2011.

The station was severely damaged in August 2021 during Hurricane Ida, and as of March 2023 the station remained off the air.

The KUHN license was surrendered in January 2026.
