= WRGC-FM =

Coordinates: 33.068°N 83.275°W

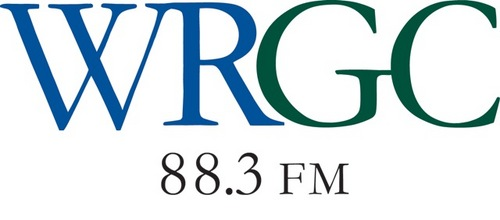
- Milledgeville, Georgia; United States
- Frequency: 88.3 MHz

Programming
- Format: Public Radio
- Affiliations: Georgia Public Broadcasting (GPB)

Ownership
- Owner: Georgia College and State University

History
- First air date: March 31, 2011

Technical information
- Licensing authority: FCC
- Class: C3
- ERP: 4,800 watts horizontal 4,300 watts vertical
- HAAT: 117 meters

Links
- Public license information: Public file; LMS

WRGC-FM, 88.3 FM, is a public radio station licensed to and operated by Georgia College in Milledgeville, Georgia. The station is an affiliate of Georgia Public Broadcasting (GPB) and its format includes classical and jazz music, NPR news and locally produced programs.

== Coverage area ==
WRGC's coverage area includes Baldwin and Putnam Counties as well as portions of Hancock, Jasper, Jones, Morgan, and Wilkinson Counties. The station is also simulcast on Milledgeville’s Governmental/Educational access channel, MBC-TV4 on Charter Communications.

== History ==
The genesis of the station began when the FCC opened a filing window for new Non-Commercial Educational FM stations. The college's then-Director of Communications, Bryan Jackson, himself a former owner of a broadcast station, realized that a frequency might be available in the Milledgeville area because of its rural location. A frequency search was conducted and an opening was found on 88.3 MHz using a directional antenna. He then filed an application with the FCC and was awarded a construction permit for the station for WRGC in late November 2008. To acquire construction funds for the station, Jackson then filed an application for a federal grant, which was approved a few months later. The station is 4.8 kW effective radiated power, at 117m HAAT, approximately equivalent to the maximum class A facility as defined by the FCC. In 2010, Georgia College received a matching grant for equipment and the university remodeled a facility on its West Campus to house the radio station. The radio station began broadcasting on March 31, 2011.

== Callsign ==
Until late May 2009, the station was originally assigned broadcast callsign WXGC, the same callsign as was previously used from 1979 until February 1997 by WGUR FM 88.9, a student radio station also owned by Georgia College. WGUR continues to operate as a student-run station. The station purchased the rights for the call letters WRGC-FM from WRGC-AM, which is located in Sylva, North Carolina.
