= KAWC-FM =

Public radio station at Arizona Western College in Yuma, Arizona, United States

- Yuma, Arizona; United States
- Broadcast area: Yuma, Arizona
- Frequency: 88.9 MHz

Programming
- Format: Public Radio, News/Talk Information
- Affiliations: National Public Radio, Public Radio International, BBC World Service

Ownership
- Owner: Arizona Western College
- Sister stations: KOFA

History
- First air date: March 27, 1992
- Call sign meaning: Arizona Western College

Technical information
- Licensing authority: FCC
- Facility ID: 2757
- Class: A
- ERP: 2,400 watts
- HAAT: 33 meters (108 ft)
- Transmitter coordinates: 32°41′23″N 114°30′1″W

Links
- Public license information: Public file; LMS
- Webcast: Listen Live news
- Website: kawc.org

KAWC-FM (88.9 FM) is a radio station licensed to Yuma, Arizona, United States. The station broadcasts news-talk and Information programming, along with a few classical music and jazz programs. The station is owned by Arizona Western College and features programming from National Public Radio and Public Radio International.

Since November 2013, KAWC-FM's programming has been simulcast on 88.9 KAWP in Parker, Arizona.

| Call sign | Frequency | City of license | FID | ERP (W) | HAAT | Class | FCC info |
|---|---|---|---|---|---|---|---|
| KAWP | 89.9 FM | Parker, Arizona | 174119 | 250 vertical 15 horizontal | 287.2 m (942 ft) | A | LMS |
