= WGEN-FM =

Community radio station in Monee, Illinois

Coordinates: 41.4133°N 87.7675°W

- Monee, Illinois; United States
- Broadcast area: South Suburban Chicago
- Frequency: 88.9 MHz

Programming
- Format: Eclectic music/Talk

Ownership
- Owner: Wild World Media, Inc.

History
- First air date: November 1, 1995
- Former call signs: WGNR (1995–1998); WMBY (1998); WJCG (1998–2007); WOTW (2007–2013)

Technical information
- Licensing authority: FCC
- Facility ID: 43708
- Class: A
- ERP: 100 watts
- HAAT: 54 meters (177 ft)

Links
- Public license information: Public file; LMS
- Webcast: Listen live
- Website: wgenradio.org

WGEN-FM is a non-commercial eclectic music/talk radio station in Monee, Illinois, broadcasting on 88.9 FM. It is owned by Wild World Media, Inc.

== History ==
The station began broadcasting November 1, 1995, holding the call sign WGNR, standing for "Good News Radio". It aired a Christian format, as an affiliate of Moody Radio, under the ownership of The Moody Bible Institute of Chicago. In January 1998, the station's call sign was changed to WMBY, and in June 1998, it was changed to WJCG. Its format would remain the same under the new call signs.

=== Worship on the Way ===
In early 2007, WJCG was acquired by Life On The Way Communications, and the station was temporarily taken silent. In April 2007, the station's call sign was changed to WOTW, and the station returned to the air shortly thereafter as an affiliate of the newly renamed "Worship On THE WAY Radio Network". The station aired Christian talk and teaching programs, with hosts such as Jack Hayford, Woodrow Kroll, Alistair Begg, and David Jeremiah, along with a variety of Christian music.

=== My Gen Radio ===
In 2013, WOTW was broken off from the simulcast of KTLW along with several translators in the Los Angeles, California area. WOTW's callsign was changed to WGEN-FM, and "My Gen Radio" was formed, which aired Christian contemporary music, and targeted a younger listening audience than sister network, "Worship On The Way Radio Network". Despite WGEN being located in a southern suburb of Chicago, Illinois, the station was primarily used to feed the 3 translators in Southern California, which was where My Gen Radio's primary target listening audience was located.

In 2015, Life On The Way Communications sold WGEN-FM to Wild World Media, Inc. at a price of $55,000.

== Translators ==
WGEN-FM was formerly simulcast on K216EM in Arcadia, California and K216FM in Valley Village, California; these translators were sold to Educational Media Foundation effective December 3, 2015, and began rebroadcasting KYLA Air1 programming.

== Popular culture ==
Fictional radio station WOTW is prominently featured in the 2019 science fiction film The Vast of Night.
