= KHII (FM) =

- Cloudcroft, New Mexico; United States
- Frequency: 88.9 MHz
- Branding: Active Radio

Programming
- Format: Gospel

Ownership
- Owner: Southern New Mexico Radio Foundation

History
- First air date: 2002
- Former call signs: KBOD (1999)

Technical information
- Facility ID: 89990
- Class: A
- ERP: 230 watts
- HAAT: 383.0 meters (1,256.6 ft)
- Transmitter coordinates: 32°59′39″N 105°42′29″W
- Translators: K248CB (97.5 MHz, Alamogordo)

Links
- Website: KHII website

KHII (88.9 FM, "Active Radio") is a radio station broadcasting a gospel music format. Licensed to Cloudcroft, New Mexico, United States, the station is currently owned by Southern New Mexico Radio Foundation.

== History ==
The Federal Communications Commission issued a construction permit for the station on May 18, 1999. The station was assigned the call sign KBOD on June 25, 1999, and on July 9, 1999, changed its call sign to the current KHII. The station was granted its license to cover on August 9, 2002.
