= Autonomous University of Carmen =

- Universidad Autónoma del Carmen
- Motto: Por la Grandeza de México
- Motto in English: For the Greatness of Mexico
- Type: Public
- Established: June 13, 1967
- Rector: José Antonio Ruz
- Students: 2,486 (2000)
- Location: Ciudad del Carmen, Campeche, Mexico
- Colours: Blue and gold
- Mascot: Dolphins
- Website: unacar.mx

The Universidad Autónoma del Carmen (Spanish for 'Autonomous University of Carmen') is an institution of higher education located in Ciudad del Carmen, Campeche, Mexico. Founded on June 13, 1967, it is the successor to the Liceo Carmelita, which was established in 1854.

== Schools ==
The university is divided into eight schools: Engineering and Technology, Health Sciences, Natural Sciences, Chemical and Oil Sciences, Information Sciences, Education and Humanities, Administrative Economic Sciences, and Law.

== Campuses ==
The school has three campuses. Campus I houses five of the eight schools as well as the Estadio Resurgimiento, home of the professional Delfines del Carmen of the Liga Mexicana de Béisbol. Campus II is located in the commercial district and houses UNACAR's bachillerato program. Campus III is on the outskirts of town and houses the health sciences, natural sciences and engineering schools.

UACC also operates a university radio station, XHUACC-FM 88.9.
