= WGUR =

- Milledgeville, Georgia; United States
- Broadcast area: Baldwin County, Georgia
- Frequency: 95.3 MHz

Programming
- Format: College/variety

Ownership
- Owner: Georgia College & State University
- Sister stations: WRGC-FM

History
- First air date: September 22, 1975
- Former call signs: WXGC (until 1997)
- Former frequencies: 91.9, 88.9
- Call sign meaning: Georgia University Radio

Technical information
- Licensing authority: FCC
- Facility ID: 23907
- Class: D
- ERP: 85 watts
- HAAT: 12.0 meters (39.4 ft)
- Transmitter coordinates: 33°4′44.00″N 83°13′55.00″W

Links
- Public license information: Public file; LMS
- Webcast: Streaming via Live365
- Website: GCSURadio.com

WGUR (95.3 FM) – branded 95.3 The Noise – is a college radio station broadcasting a variety format. Licensed to Milledgeville, Georgia, United States, the station is owned by Georgia College & State University. Initially named WXGC "88 Rock," the station officially began airing on January 10, 1975.

== History ==
WGUR began after one student wanted to increase student involvement on campus. Frank Howell, a Student Government Member and Sociology major, spoke with his roommate, Greg Duckworth, about creating a student-run radio station. The two traveled to other campus stations and applied for grants, and by 1974, the station had received more than $5,000 from student activities funding. Mayfair Hall on the Georgia College & State University campus soon became home to the new station.

WXGC became licensed by the Federal Communications Commission as a non-commercial radio station in two years. It initially had a broadcasting power of 10 watts. At the time, about 17 students worked for the station and aired campus sports special events, campus news, and music. Pete Konenkamp, who was among the first students hired in 1975, was inducted into the Georgia Association Of Broadcasters Hall Of Fame in 2025. Five years later, in 1979, the station had about 25 students on-staff who served as disk jockeys, news and sports announcers, producers, office staff, and public affairs programmers.

With the increase of student interest, WXGC was in need of a larger space to conduct business. The station relocated to another campus building, Atkinson Hall, and then eventually made its way to Terrell Hall, its current site. On March 30, 2012, the station switched its frequency to 95.3 FM and became WGUR. The tagline, "The Noise," was created the same year and has been a part of the station ever since.

There are now over 40 students who are on-staff or volunteer for WGUR. The station allows students to have the creative freedom to do as they please, whether that's playing music, news, sports, or having a podcast of their choice. It now has an audio power of 100 watts and also streams online.

On March 30, 2012, WGUR vacated the 88.9 FM frequency and moved up the dial to 95.3 FM.

== See also ==
- Campus radio
- List of college radio stations in the United States
