= Hills Radio =

Radio station in Mount Barker, South Australia

Hills Radio Incorporated is currently an internet-based community radio broadcasting station based in Mount Barker, South Australia. Hills Radio began broadcasting in the Adelaide Hills region under a Temporary Community Broadcasting Licence (TCBL) in August 2014 issued by the Australian Communications and Media Authority (ACMA).

Hills Radio Incorporated is supported by 60 volunteer members who produce over 40 local radio programs each week. The station operates 24/7 streaming only at this point in time. With the high number of listeners transitioning to internet streaming, the station continues to be viable and attracts a growing list of station supporters and sponsors from the community.

Hills Radio Incorporated streaming audience was in excess of 34,000 in 2020 and continues to grow, as does the Adelaide Hills population.

Hills Radio Incorporated works as a complimentary service to other community radio stations throughout the state, providing training in radio, admin skills and how to communicate successfully when behind a microphone. Hills Radio trainees have gone on to work in Commercial around the country and overseas.

Hills Radio Incorporated provides an OnDemand system where past shows can easily be listened to should a listener miss their favourite program.

Hills Radio Incorporated can be heard via www.hillsradio.com.au

Hills Radio ceased operations on 30 November 2021.
