= KVER (FM) =

Radio station in El Paso, Texas

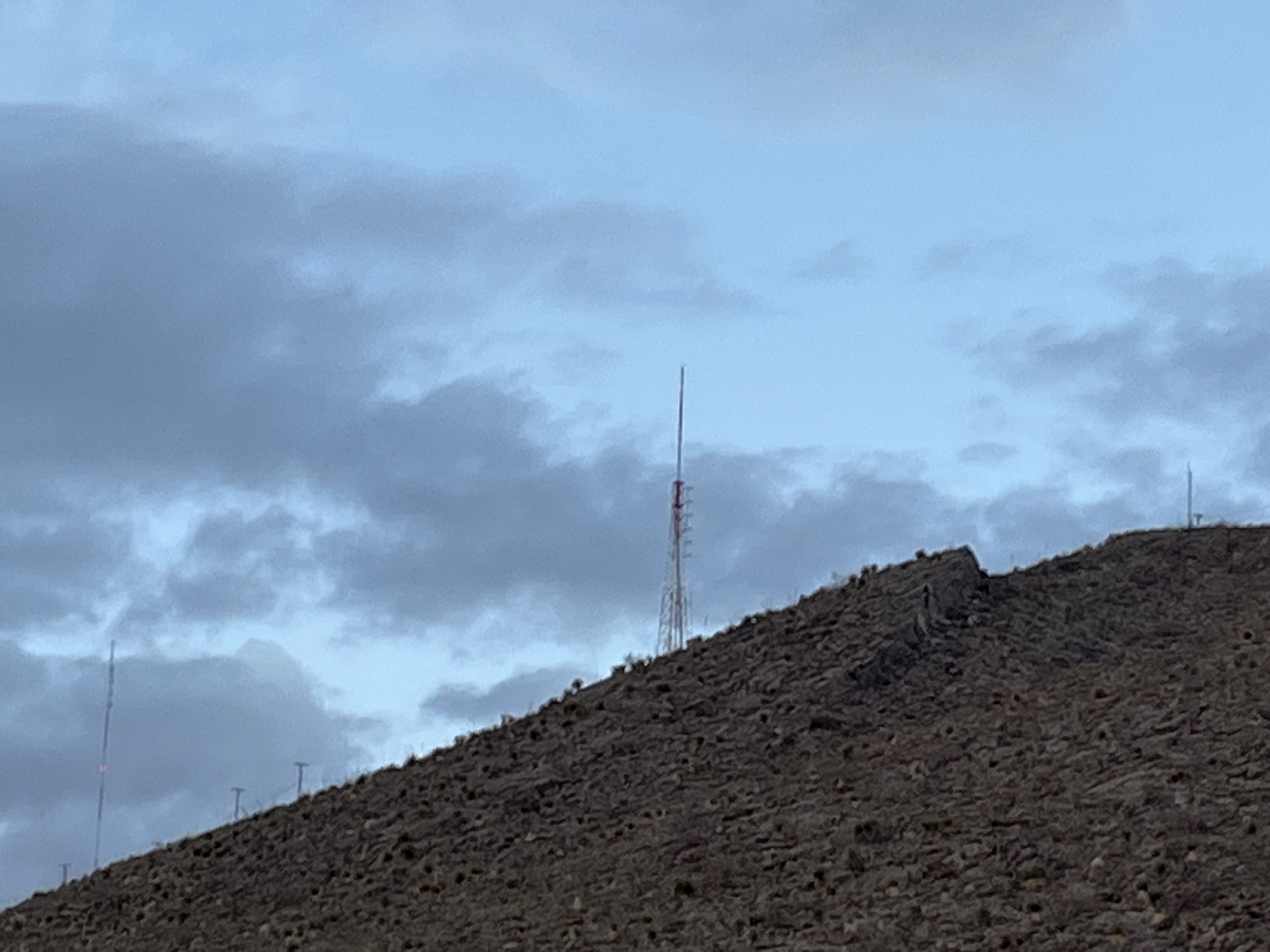
- El Paso, Texas; United States
- Broadcast area: El Paso metropolitan area – Ciudad Juárez
- Frequency: 91.1 MHz
- Branding: Radio Manantial 91.1 FM

Programming
- Format: Spanish Christian radio

Ownership
- Owner: World Radio Network, Inc.

History
- Call sign meaning: "River"

Technical information
- Licensing authority: FCC
- Facility ID: 73745
- Class: A
- ERP: 510 watts
- HAAT: 340 meters (1,120 ft)
- Transmitter coordinates: 31°47′33.4″N 106°28′50.0″W

Links
- Public license information: Public file; LMS
- Website: www.manantialelpaso.org

KVER (91.1 MHz Radio Manantial) is a non-commercial, listener-supported Spanish language radio station in El Paso, Texas. It is owned by World Radio Network, Inc. and airs a Christian radio format.
