= WCSU-FM =

Coordinates: 39.716°N 83.874°W

- Wilberforce, Ohio; United States
- Frequency: 88.9 MHz (HD Radio)
- Branding: Jazzy 88.9

Programming
- Format: Smooth jazz / Urban gospel
- Subchannels: HD2: College radio "On Our Own Radio"
- Affiliations: NPR

Ownership
- Owner: Central State University

History
- First air date: 1962
- Call sign meaning: W Central State University

Technical information
- Licensing authority: FCC
- Facility ID: 9958
- Class: A
- ERP: 1,000 watts
- HAAT: 53 meters

Links
- Public license information: Public file; LMS
- Webcast: Listen live
- Website: wcsufm.org oooradio.com (HD2)

WCSU-FM (88.9 MHz) is a NPR member station. Licensed in Wilberforce, Ohio, United States, the station is currently owned by Central State University. Music programming is a contemporary/smooth jazz blend with some urban gospel programming.

It is the oldest HBCU radio station.

In the early 1980s, the station was programmed by Program Director Willis Parker. The General Manager was LaRue Turner, who was also WCSU-FM's Chief Engineer. Dr. Fuad Suleiman was the Administrator responsible for the Telecommunications function at CSU. A small corps of full-time staff and CSU students operated the station 24 hours a day, 7 days a week. The station offered music, NPR (National Public Radio) news and other syndicated content; it also provided a handful of station-generated original programming, including hour-long local and state-oriented news/public-affairs shows, and a live, nightly talk show, called "At Issue". From time-to-time, the station broadcast convocation speakers and CSU athletic events as well as sending on-air staff into the community for remote broadcasts (such as at the Greene County Fair).
