= List of Pacifica Radio stations and affiliates =

This article provides a list of Pacifica Radio owned-and-operated stations, associated stations and affiliate stations.

== Radio stations ==
=== Pacifica stations ===
Owned & operated stations
Station	Frequency	Location
WBAI	99.5 FM	New York City
KPFA	94.1 FM	Berkeley, California
KPFB^{1}	89.3 FM	Berkeley, California
KPFK	90.7 FM	Los Angeles
KPFT	90.1 FM	Houston
WPFW	89.3 FM	Washington, D.C.

=== Affiliates ===
==== Western U.S. affiliate stations ====
Western U.S. affiliate stations
Station	Frequency	Location
KACR-LP	96.1 FM	Alameda, California
KAKU-LP	88.5 FM	Kahului, Hawaii
KAPY-LP	104.9 FM	Duvall, Washington
KAOS	89.3 FM	Olympia, Washington
KAQA^{3}	91.9 FM	Kilauea, Hawaii
KBBF	89.1 FM	Calistoga, California
KBCS	91.3 FM	Bellevue, Washington
KBCU	88.1 FM	North Newton, Kansas
KBMF-LP	102.5 FM	Butte, Montana
KBOG-LP	97.9 FM	Bandon, Oregon
KBOO	90.7 FM	Portland, Oregon
KBRP-LP	96.1 FM	Bisbee, Arizona
KBUT	90.3 FM	Crested Butte, Colorado
KCBP	95.5 FM	Westley, California
KCEI	90.1 FM	Red River, New Mexico
KCIW-LP	100.7 FM	Brookings, Oregon
KCPK-LP	106.9 FM	Pine Mountain Club, California
KCSB-FM	91.9 FM	Santa Barbara, California
KDRT-LP	101.5 FM	Davis, California
KDUR	91.9 FM	Durango, Colorado
KDVS	90.3 FM	Davis, California
KEOS	89.1 FM	College Station, Texas
KEPJ-LP	96.5 FM	San Antonio, Texas
KEPW-LP	97.3 FM	Eugene, Oregon
KEUL	88.9 FM	Girdwood, Alaska
KFOI^{4}	90.9 FM	Red Bluff/Redding, California
KFTN-LP	92.7 FM	Fenton, Missouri
KFUG-LP	101.7 FM	Crescent City, California
KFZR-LP	93.3 FM	Frazier Park, California
KGLP	91.7 FM	Gallup, New Mexico
KGNU	88.5 FM	Boulder, Colorado
KGUA	88.3 FM	Gualala, California
KGVM	95.9 FM	Bozeman, Montana
KHEN-LP	106.9 FM	Salida, Colorado
KHOI	89.1 FM	Ames, Iowa
KIDE	91.3 FM	Hoopa, California
KKCR	90.9 FM	Hanalei, Hawaii
KKFI	90.1 FM	Kansas City, Missouri
KKRN	88.9 FM	Bella Vista, California
KKWE	89.9 FM	White Earth, Minnesota
KLAI^{2}	90.3 FM	Laytonville, California
KLOI-LP	102.9 FM	Lopez Island, Washington
KMUD	91.1 FM	Garberville, California
KMUE^{2}	88.1 FM	Eureka, California
KMUN	91.9 FM	Astoria, Oregon
KNFS-LP	98.1 FM	Tulare, California
KNIZ	90.1 FM	Gallup, New Mexico
KNON	89.3 FM	Dallas, Texas
KNSJ	89.1 FM	Descanso, California
KNVC-LP	95.1 FM	Carson City, Nevada
KOCF-LP	92.7 FM	Veneta, Oregon
KODX-LP	96.9 FM	Seattle, Washington
KOPN	89.5 FM	Columbia, Missouri
KOWN-LP	95.7 FM	Omaha, Nebraska
KOYO-LP	107.1 FM	Oroville, California
KOYT-LP	97.1 FM	Anza, California
KPOV-FM	88.9 FM	Bend, Oregon
KPPQ-LP	104.1 FM	Ventura, California
KPRI	91.3 FM	Pala, California
KPSQ-LP	97.3 FM	Fayetteville, Arkansas
KPTZ	91.9 FM	Port Townsend, Washington
KQRU-LP	107.9 FM	Santa Clarita, California
KRBX	89.9 FM	Caldwell, Idaho
KRCL	90.9 FM	Salt Lake City, Utah
KRDP	90.7 FM	Apache Junction, Arizona
KRFP	90.3 FM	Moscow, Idaho
KRFY	88.5 FM	Ponderay, Idaho
KRJF-LP	92.3 FM	Santa Rosa, California
KROV	91.1 FM	Oroville, California
KRZA	88.7 FM	Alamosa, Colorado
KSER	90.7 FM	Everett, Washington
KSFR	101.1 FM	White Rock, New Mexico
KSKQ	89.5 FM	Ashland, Oregon
KSQD	90.7 FM	Santa Cruz, California
KSUA	91.5 FM	Fairbanks, Alaska
KSVR	91.7 FM	Mount Vernon, Washington
KTCB^{6}	89.5 FM	Tillamook, Oregon
KTDE	100.5 FM	Gualala, California
KTWH-LP	99.5 FM	Two Harbors, Minnesota
KUCR	88.3 FM	Riverside, California
KUGS	89.3 FM	Bellingham, Washington
KUNM	89.9 FM	Albuquerque, New Mexico
KUOI	89.3 FM	Moscow, Idaho
KURU	89.1 FM	Silver City, New Mexico
KVMR	89.5 FM	Nevada City, California
KWCP-LP	98.9 FM	Little Rock, Arkansas
KWRK-LP	101.7 FM	Fairbanks, Alaska
KWSI-LP	100.3 FM	Grand Junction, Colorado
KWTF	88.1 FM	Bodega Bay, California
KWVA	88.1 FM	Eugene, Oregon
KXCI	91.3 FM	Tucson, Arizona
KXCJ-LP	105.7 FM	Cave Junction, Oregon
KXCR	90.7 FM	Florence, Oregon
KXEP-LP	101.5 FM	San Antonio, Texas
KYAQ	91.7 FM	Siletz, Oregon
KYBU	96.9 FM	Covelo, California
KYGT-LP	102.7 FM	Idaho Springs, Colorado
KYRS	88.1 FM	Medical Lake, Washington
KZAX-LP	94.9 FM	Bellingham, Washington
KZFR	90.1 FM	Chico, California
KZGM	88.1 FM	Cabool, Missouri
KZMU	89.7 FM	Moab, Utah
KZYX	90.7 FM	Philo, California
KZYZ^{4}	91.5 FM	Willits, California

==== Eastern U.S. affiliate stations ====
Eastern U.S. affiliate stations
Station	Frequency	Location
WADR-LP	103.5 FM	Janesville, Wisconsin
WAKT-LP	106.1 FM	Toledo, Ohio
WAPJ	89.9 FM	Torrington, Connecticut
WAZU	90.7 FM	Peoria, Illinois
WBCR-LP	97.7 FM	Great Barrington, Massachusetts
WBPU-LP	96.3 FM	St. Petersburg, Florida
WBDY-LP	99.5 FM	Binghamton, New York
WBTV-LP	99.3 FM	Burlington, Vermont
WCAA-LP	107.3 FM	Albany, New York
WCOM-LP	103.5 FM	Carrboro, North Carolina
WCPT	820 AM	Willow Springs, Illinois
WCRS-LP	98.3 FM	Columbus, Ohio
WCRX	88.1 FM	Chicago, Illinois
WDBX	91.1 FM	Carbondale, Illinois
WDRT	91.9 FM	Viroqua, Wisconsin
WDSE-FM	103.3 FM	Duluth, Minnesota
WDSV	91.9 FM	Greenville, Mississippi
WECI	91.5 FM	Richmond, Indiana
WEFT	90.1 FM	Champaign, Illinois
WEJP-LP	107.1 FM	Wheeling, West Virginia
WEOS	89.7 FM	Geneva, New York
WERU-FM	89.9 FM	Blue Hill, Maine
WESU	88.1 FM	Middletown, Connecticut
WFMP-LP	106.5 FM	Louisville, Kentucky
WFVR-LP	96.5 FM	South Royalton, Vermont
WGDH^{5}	91.7 FM	Hardwick, Vermont
WGDR	91.1 FM	Plainfield, Vermont
WGRN-LP	91.9 FM	Columbus, Ohio
WGXC	90.7-FM	Acra, New York
WHAV-LP	97.9 FM	Haverhill, Massachusetts
WHIV-LP	102.3 FM	New Orleans, Louisiana
WHPW-LP	97.3 FM	Harpswell, Maine
WHYR-LP	96.9 FM	Baton Rouge, Louisiana
WHYS-LP	96.3 FM	Eau Claire, Wisconsin
WIEC-LP	102.7 FM	Eau Claire, Wisconsin
WINO	91.9 FM	Watkins Glen, New York
WIOF-LP	104.1 FM	Woodstock, New York
WJFF	90.5 FM	Jeffersonville, New York
WKEM-LP	98.5 FM	Montgomery, Alabama
WLPN-LP	105.5 FM	Chicago, Illinois
WLPP-LP	102.9 FM	Palenville, New York
WLTL	88.1 FM	La Grange, Illinois
WMNF	88.5 FM	Tampa, Florida
WMPG	90.9 FM	Gorham, Maine
WMRW-LP	94.5 FM	Warren, Vermont
WMTB-LP	96.7 FM	St. Petersburg, Florida
WNCU	90.7 FM	Durham, North Carolina
WNHN-LP	94.7 FM	Concord, New Hampshire
WNUC-LP	96.7 FM	Detroit, Michigan
WNUZ-LP	92.9 FM	Gap, Pennsylvania
WOJB	88.9 FM	Hayward, Wisconsin
WOMR	92.1 FM	Provincetown, Massachusetts
WONY	90.9 FM	Oneonta, New York
WOOC-LP	105.3 FM	Troy, New York
WOOL-FM	91.5 FM	Bellows Falls, Vermont
WORT	89.9 FM	Madison, Wisconsin
WPHX-LP	101.9 FM	Ruskin, Florida
WPKN	89.5 FM	Bridgeport, Connecticut
WPPJ	670 AM	Pittsburgh, Pennsylvania
WPPM-LP	106.5 FM	Philadelphia, Pennsylvania
WPPP-LP	100.7 FM	Athens, Georgia
WPRR	90.1 FM	Clyde Township, Michigan
WPVM-LP	103.7 FM	Asheville, North Carolina
WRAQ-LP	92.7 FM	Angelica, New York
WRCT	88.3 FM	Pittsburgh, Pennsylvania
WRFA-LP	107.9 FM	Jamestown, New York
WRFG	89.3 FM	Atlanta
WRFL	88.1 FM	Lexington, Kentucky
WRFN-LP	107.1 FM	Nashville, Tennessee
WRFZ-LP	106.3 FM	Rochester, New York
WRIR-LP	97.3 FM	Richmond, Virginia
WRPI	91.5 FM	Troy, New York
WRWK-LP	93.9 FM	Midlothian, Virginia
WSCA-LP	106.1 FM	Portsmouth, New Hampshire
WSLR-LP	96.5 FM	Sarasota, Florida
WSQX	91.5 FM	Binghamton, New York
WTSR	91.3 FM	Trenton, New Jersey
WUMO-LP	94.5 FM	Montgomery, Alabama
WUSB	90.1 FM	Stony Brook, New York
WVGT-LP	97.1 FM	Mount Dora, Florida
WVKR-FM	91.3 FM	Poughkeepsie, New York
WVVY-LP	96.7 FM	Tisbury, Massachusetts
WWSX-LP	99.1 FM	Rehoboth Beach, Delaware
WXDR-LP	99.1 FM	New Orleans, Louisiana
WXHR-LP	97.3 FM	Hillman, Michigan
WXOJ-LP	103.3 FM	Florence, Massachusetts
WXOX-LP	97.1 FM	Louisville, Kentucky
WXPI	88.5 FM	Jersey Shore, Pennsylvania
WXRW-LP	104.1 FM	Milwaukee, Wisconsin
WYAP-LP	101.7 FM	Clay, West Virginia
WZNC-LP	99.9 FM	Bethlehem, New Hampshire
WZRD	88.3 FM	Chicago, Illinois

==== International affiliate stations ====
International affiliate stations
Station	Frequency	Location
CHMR-FM	93.5 FM	St. John's, Newfoundland and Labrador, Canada
CJUM-FM	101.5 FM	Winnipeg, Manitoba, Canada
CKUT-FM	90.3 FM	Montréal, Québec, Canada
Radio LoRa	97.5 FM	Zürich, Switzerland

- ^{1}KPFB rebroadcasts KPFA for 99% of its schedule.
- ^{2}KMUE and KLAI rebroadcast KMUD full-time.
- ^{3}KAQA rebroadcasts KKCR full-time.
- ^{4}KZYZ rebroadcasts KZYX full-time.
- ^{5}WGDH rebroadcasts WGDR.
- ^{6}KTCB rebroadcasts KMUN full time.

=== FM translator stations ===
Owned & operated translator stations
Station	Frequency	Location	Primary station
K204AE^{1}	88.7 FM	China Lake, California	KPFK
K254AH	98.7 FM	Isla Vista, California	KPFK
K229BO	93.7 FM	Rancho Bernardo, California	KPFK
K248BR	97.5 FM	Santa Cruz, California	KPFA
K208DG	89.5 FM	Galveston, Texas	KPFT
K212FV	90.3 FM	Goodrich, Texas	KPFT
K220KC	91.9 FM	Huntsville, Texas	KPFT

- ^{1}Note: K204AE is owned by a community organization, but rebroadcasts an owned & operated station.

Associated stations
Station	Frequency	Location
KFCF^{2}	88.1 FM	Fresno, California

- ^{2}Associate station KFCF rebroadcasts KPFA for 85% of its schedule.

Affiliate translator stations
Station	Frequency	Location	Primary station
K235AK	94.9 FM	Jack's Cabin, Colorado	KBUT
K230AC	93.9 FM	North La Plata County, Colorado	KDUR
K294AM	106.7 FM	Saint Paul, Minnesota	KFAI
K205FM	88.9 FM	Honolulu, Hawaii	KKCR
K224CQ	92.7 FM	Anahola, Hawaii	KKCR
KAQA-FM1	91.9 FM	Kilauea, Hawaii	KKCR
K207FG	89.3 FM	Cannon Beach, Oregon	KMUN
K217FG	91.3 FM	South Astoria, Oregon	KMUN
K286AN	105.1 FM	Truckee, California	KVMR
K204BR	88.7 FM	Lake City, Colorado	KVNF
K205BA	88.9 FM	Ridgway, Colorado	KVNF
K211BH	90.1 FM	Ouray, Colorado	KVNF
K252AM	98.3 FM	Hotchkiss, Colorado	KVNF
K222BG	92.3 FM	Dartford, Washington	KYRS
K291AF	106.1 FM	Castle Valley, Utah	KZMU
W201CD	88.1 FM	Lansing, New York	WINO
W212BA	90.3 FM	Geneva, New York	WEOS
W275AE	102.9 FM	Bangor, Maine	WERU
W233AH	94.5 FM	Monticello, New York	WJFF
W281AC	104.1 FM	Portland, Maine	WMPG

== Other services ==
Streaming & other services
Station	Website	Location
Beware! The Radio	https://bewaretheradio.com/	London, England
Global Community Radio (GCR)	https://globalcommunityradio.blogspot.com/	Geneva, New York
Hands Up Radio (HUPR)	https://www.frederickhand.com/handsupradio	Birmingham, Alabama
No Lies Radio	https://noliesradio.org/	Pinole, California
Planet Waves Radio	https://planetwaves.fm/	Kingston, New York
Radio Phoenix	https://listen2krdp.com/	Tucson, Arizona
The Detour Network	http://thedetour.us/	Knoxville, Tennessee
World Radio Paris	http://worldradio.fr/	Paris, France

== See also ==
- List of community radio stations in the United States
