= Free-form radio =

Radio format in which the disc jockey is given total control over what music to play

Free-form, or free-form radio, is a radio station programming format in which the disc jockey is given wide or total control over what music to play, regardless of music genre or commercial interests. Freeform radio stands in contrast to most commercial radio stations, in which DJs have little or no influence over programming structure or playlists. In the United States, freeform DJs are still bound by Federal Communications Commission regulations.

== History ==
Many shows claim to be the first free-form radio program, but the earliest on record is "Nightsounds" on KPFA-FM in Berkeley, California, D.J.'d by John Leonard. Probably the best-remembered in the Midwest is Beaker Street, which ran for almost 10 years on KAAY "The Mighty 1090" in Little Rock, Arkansas, beginning in 1966, making it also probably the best-known such show on an AM station; its signal reached from Canada to Mexico and Cuba, blanketing the Midwest and Midsouth of the U.S. WFMU is currently the longest-running freeform radio station in the United States, having adopted the format full time in the summer of 1968. WNEW-FM 102.7 in NYC was the first commercial station in the US to introduce a free-form format, in October 1967. It stayed that way under the ownership of Metromedia Broadcasting until it was sold and the new owners were not interested. WNEW-FM was a leader in introducing new music and making household names of a good deal of the bands that became known in the 1960s and '70s. Jim Ladd of KLOS in Los Angeles, California was one of the most notable freeform DJs. Tom Petty wrote a song about Jim Ladd called "The Last DJ". The only time Jim Ladd didn't have complete control over what music is being played is when he turned control over to his faithful listeners commonly referred to as "The Tribe". On October 26, 2011, Ladd was among various staffers let go from KLOS following the acquisition of station owner Citadel Broadcasting by Cumulus Media. From 2012 until shortly before his death in 2023, Ladd hosted a daily freeform show on Sirius XM's Deep Tracks.

"FM's free-form progressivism had proven essential to the pop process. But the new radio was only another example of the quirkish vitality of a new mass culture (call it youth, call it pop) that seemed destined to defy the status quo."

— Christgau's Record Guide: Rock Albums of the Seventies (1981)

The free-form ethos tends to disdain playlists confined to a single music genre. However, DJs may opt to play selections according to an arbitrary theme (e.g., Bob Dylan's "Subterranean Homesick Blues" followed by Radiohead's "Subterranean Homesick Alien"). Freeform-ish stations that played only or almost only rock music were known as progressive rock stations, while those that play mostly folk and/or country-leaning cuts are known as Americana stations.

Commercial free-form radio stations were common in the late 1960s and early '70s, particularly on the FM band, but are rare today. An exceptional case was Indie 103.1 FM of Santa Monica and Newport Beach, California. Indie 103.1 broadcast radio programs in which famous musicians from the world of popular music host radio programs and choose the playlist. Indie 103.1 left the FM airwaves in 2009, but continued on the internet for a time.

Another commercial free-form radio station is KHUM, "radio without the rules", on 104.3 and 104.7 FM in Ferndale, California. KHUM has transmitted since 1996 and is the most popular station in Humboldt County, California.

Internet radio and, to a lesser extent, college radio are sanctuaries of the free-form format (although even the latter has lost much of its independence as stations begin modeling corporate stations in their presentation). On Sirius XM satellite radio, the weekly Bob Dylan-hosted Theme Time Radio Hour featured a freeform format, as do several specialty programs on The Loft. The nationally syndicated The Mainstream, distributed by Native Voice One, follows a freeform format. Many terrestrial freeform stations are small and lack corporate backing, and therefore have relatively weak radio transmitters (especially around metropolitan areas where corporate radio signals dominate, but at the same time have enough of a population density to cover enough people to support such a station), a problem that has caused numerous broadcasters to transition to Internet radio, pirate radio or both.

In Canada, Reiner Schwarz was a prominent pioneer of the free-form format, often being hired to host free-form shows on radio stations that were otherwise conventionally formatted apart from his program.

The full service format can be seen as a variant of the free-form format, though since most full-service stations are located in rural areas, country music, adult standards, classic hits (oldies or classic rock), and occasionally adult contemporary music tend to form the bulk of the music on a full-service station, and the vast majority of full-service stations focus primarily on mainstream, popular music (whereas freeform stations often put the emphasis on less widely known or more exotic selections).

== Adult hits/Jack FM ==
The adult hits brand can be considered a "sequel" of sorts to the freeform format. Many of these stations play a wide variety of music ranging from many formats that includes, but is not limited to: Oldies/classic hits, classic rock, adult contemporary, Mainstream Top 40/Adult Top 40, etc. Most of the music played on these stations are from the years 1970–2020, although a few 1960s tracks may be sprinkled in. Unlike freeform radio, adult hits stations emphasize familiar hit songs from researched playlists, and sometimes operate without disk jockeys.

The most notable adult hits station brand is Jack FM, which has many affiliates across the world. Several imitators of the Jack brand and its associated slogan "Playing What We Want" have also emerged. These imitators often use the name of a person, place or a historical site and can include: Mac (E.G. Mac 94.7 Clinton, Iowa) historical figures (E.G. The Chief 92.5 Champaign, Illinois), etc.

== Freeform stations ==
=== United States ===
- KALX (Berkeley, California)
- KAOS (Olympia, Washington)
- KBGA (Missoula, Montana)
- KBMF-LP (Butte, Montana)
- KBOO (Portland, Oregon)
- KBUT (Crested Butte, Colorado)
- KBVR (Oregon State University, Corvallis, Oregon)
- KCOU (University of Missouri, Columbia, Missouri)
- KCR (San Diego State University, San Diego, California)
- KCRW (Santa Monica College, Santa Monica, California)
- KCSB-FM (University of California, Santa Barbara, Goleta, California)
- KDHX (St. Louis, Missouri)
- KDVS (University of California, Davis, Davis, California)
- KDEO (Radio Free Hawaii, Waipahu, Oahu, Hawaii)
- KFAT (defunct), (Gilroy, California)
- KFFP-LP (Portland, Oregon Freeform Portland)
- KFJC (Foothill College, Los Altos Hills, California)
- KHUM (Ferndale, California)
- KJHK (University of Kansas, Lawrence, Kansas)
- KKCR (Hanalei, Hawaii)
- KMMT (Mammoth Lakes, California)
- KMNO (Wailuku, Hawaii)
- KMNR (Missouri University of Science and Technology, Rolla, Missouri)
- KMRD (Madrid, New Mexico)
- KMUD (Garberville, California)
- KNON (Dallas, Texas)
- KOPN (Columbia, Missouri)
- KPSU (Portland State University, Portland, Oregon)
- KRBX (Boise, Idaho)
- KRHV (Big Pine, California)
- KRLX (Carleton College, Northfield, Minnesota)
- KRUI-FM (University of Iowa, Iowa City, Iowa)
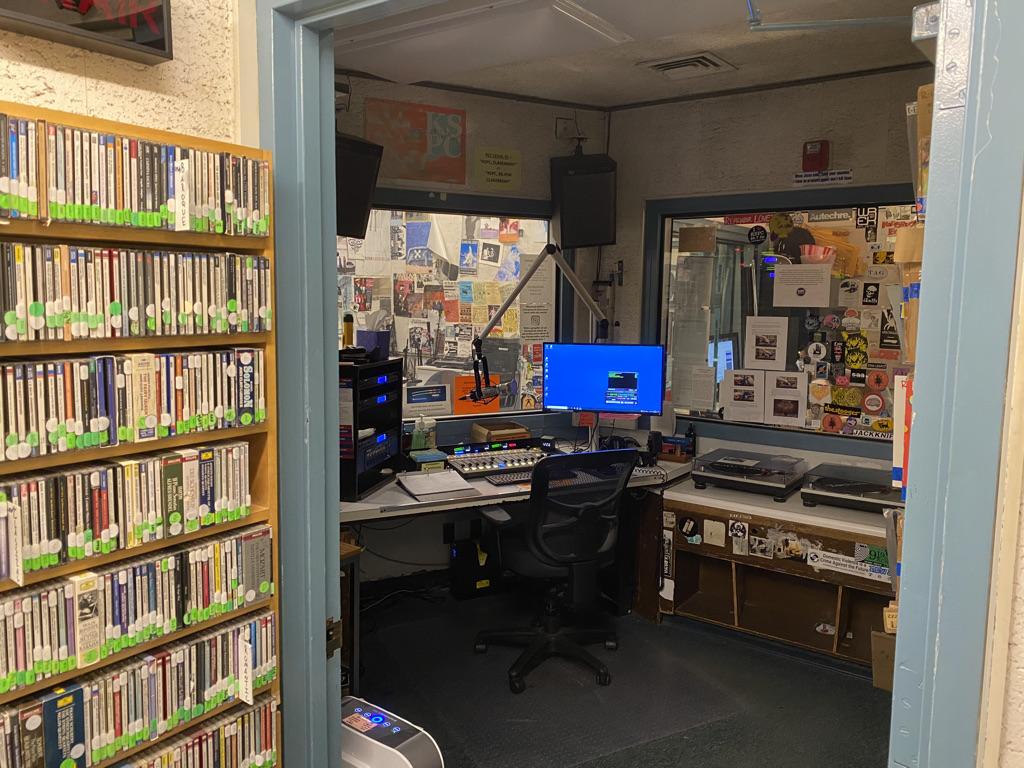
- Recording studio at KSPC, a free-form campus radio station based at Pomona College in California
  KSPC (Pomona College, Claremont, California)
- KSSU (Sacramento State, Sacramento, California)
- KTEC (Oregon Institute of Technology, Klamath Falls, Oregon)
- KTEQ-FM (South Dakota School of Mines and Technology, Rapid City, South Dakota)
- KTRM (Truman State University, Kirksville, Missouri)
- K-UTE (University of Utah, Salt Lake City, Utah)
- KUCI (University of California, Irvine, Irvine, California)
- KUOI (University of Idaho, Moscow, Idaho)
- KURE (Iowa State University. Ames, Iowa)
- KVHS (Clayton Valley High School. Clayton, California)
- KVRX (University of Texas at Austin, Austin, Texas)
- KVSC (St. Cloud State University, St. Cloud, Minnesota)
- KWCW-FM (Whitman College, Walla Walla, WA)
- KWUR (Washington University in St. Louis, St. Louis, Missouri)
- KWVA (University of Oregon, Eugene, Oregon)
- KXLU (Loyola Marymount University, Los Angeles, California)
- KXRY (Portland, Oregon)
- KUTZ-LP (Sacramento, California)
- KZSU (Stanford University, Stanford, California)
- Radio Free Brooklyn (Brooklyn, New York)
- Radio Paradise (Paradise, California)
- WARC (Allegheny College, Meadville, Pennsylvania)
- WBAR (Barnard College, New York, New York)
- WBGU (Bowling Green State University, Bowling Green, Ohio)
- WCAL (California University of Pennsylvania, California, Pennsylvania)
- WCBN-FM (University of Michigan, Ann Arbor, Michigan)
- WCNI (Connecticut College, New London, Connecticut)
- WCKS (Grand Valley State University, Grand Rapids, Michigan)
- WESS (East Stroudsburg University, East Stroudsburg, Pennsylvania)
- WESU (Wesleyan University, Middletown, Connecticut)
- WETX-LP (Tri-Cities, Tennessee)
- WEVL (Memphis, Tennessee)
- WERA-LP (Arlington, Virginia)
- WEXP (Philadelphia, Pennsylvania)
- WFCF (St. Augustine, Florida) (Flagler College Radio)
- WFMU (Jersey City, New Jersey)
- WGDR (Plainfield, Vermont)
- WHCM (William Rainey Harper College, Palatine, Illinois)
- WHRW (Binghamton University, Binghamton, New York)
- WIIT (Illinois Institute of Technology, Chicago, Illinois)
- WIUP-FM (Indiana University of Pennsylvania, Indiana, Pennsylvania)
- WIKD-LP (Embry-Riddle Aeronautical University, Daytona Beach, Florida)
- WJVS-FM (Great Oaks Institute of Technology and Career Development, Sharonville, Ohio)
- WKCO (Kenyon College, Gambier, Ohio)
- WKDU (Philadelphia, Pennsylvania)
- WLHI (Lehigh Carbon Community College, Schnecksville, Pennsylvania)
- WLRA (Lewis University, Romeoville, Illinois)
- WLSO (Lake Superior State University, Sault Sainte Marie, MI)
- WMBR (MIT, Cambridge, Massachusetts)
- WMFO (Tufts University, Medford, Massachusetts)
- WMMT (FM) (Appalshop, Whitesburg, Kentucky)
- WMSC (Montclair State University, Upper Montclair, New Jersey)
- WMSR (Miami University, Oxford, Ohio)
- WMSE (Milwaukee School of Engineering, Milwaukee, Wisconsin)
- WMTU (Michigan Technological University, Houghton, Michigan)
- WMUA (University of Massachusetts Amherst, Amherst, Massachusetts)
- WMUC (University of Maryland, College Park, Maryland)
- WMUH (Muhlenberg College, Allentown, Pennsylvania)
- WOWD-LP (Takoma Park, Maryland)
- WNJR (Washington & Jefferson College, Washington, Pennsylvania)
- WOBC (Oberlin College, Oberlin, Ohio)
- WOWI (Norfolk, VA)
- WPCR-FM (Plymouth State University, Plymouth, New Hampshire)
- WPKN (Bridgeport, Connecticut)
- WPRB (Princeton University, Princeton, New Jersey)
- WPRK (Rollins College, Winter Park, Florida)
- WRCT (Carnegie Mellon University, Pittsburgh, Pennsylvania)
- WRCU-FM (Colgate University, Hamilton, New York)
- WREK (Georgia Institute of Technology, Atlanta, Georgia)
- WRFL (University of Kentucky, Lexington, Kentucky)
- WRFW (University of Wisconsin–River Falls)
- WRMC-FM (Middlebury College, Middlebury, Vermont)
- WRNC-LP (defunct) (Northland College (Wisconsin), Ashland, Wisconsin)
- WRPI (Rensselaer Polytechnic Institute, Troy, New York)
- WRUR (University of Rochester, Rochester, New York)
- WRUV (University of Vermont, Burlington, Vermont)
- WRVU (Vanderbilt University, Nashville, Tennessee)
- WSBF (Clemson University, Clemson, South Carolina)
- WSHE (Frederick, Maryland)
- WSPN (Skidmore College, Saratoga Springs, New York)
- WSFX (Luzerne County Community College, Nanticoke, Pennsylvania)
- WSUM (University of Wisconsin–Madison, Madison, Wisconsin)
- WTJU (University of Virginia, Charlottesville, Virginia)
- WTTU (Tennessee Technological University, Cookeville, Tennessee)
- WTUL (Tulane University, New Orleans, Louisiana)
- WUMD (University of Michigan–Dearborn, Dearborn, Michigan)
- WUPX - RadioX (Northern Michigan University, Marquette, Michigan)
- WUSB-FM (Stony Brook University, Stony Brook, New York)
- WUSC (University of South Carolina, Columbia, South Carolina)
- WUVT-FM (Virginia Tech, Blacksburg, Virginia)
- WVBR-FM (Ithaca, New York)
- WVKR-FM (Vassar College, Poughkeepsie, New York)
- WVPH "The Core" (Rutgers University, Piscataway)
- WVYC (York College of Pennsylvania, York, Pennsylvania)
- WWPT (Staples High School, Westport, Connecticut)
- WXBC (Bard College, Annandale-on-Hudson, New York)
- WXDU (Duke University, Durham, North Carolina)
- WXYC (UNC-Chapel Hill, Chapel Hill, North Carolina)
- WUAG (UNC-Greensboro, Greensboro, North Carolina)
- WXZY-LP (Kane, Pennsylvania)
- WZBC (Boston College, Newton, Massachusetts)
- WZBT (Gettysburg College, Gettysburg, Pennsylvania)
- WZRD (Northeastern Illinois University, Chicago, Illinois)
- WDCE (University of Richmond, Richmond, Virginia)

=== Canada ===
- CFCR-FM (Saskatoon, Saskatchewan)
- CKCU-FM (Ottawa, Ontario)
- CJAM-FM (Windsor, Ontario)
- CKIA-FM (Quebec, Quebec)
- CKUA Radio Network (Edmonton, Alberta)
- CKUT-FM (Montreal, Quebec)
- CKRL-FM (Quebec, Quebec) is the longest-running French-speaking community radio station
- CJTR-FM (Regina, Saskatchewan)

=== Europe ===
- KilRock ('s Gravendeel, The Netherlands)
- Radio Centraal (Antwerp, Belgium)
- Subcity Radio (Glasgow, Scotland)
- RUC (Coimbra, Portugal)
- FIP (Paris, France)

=== Australia ===
- PBS 106.7FM (Melbourne, Victoria)
- 3RRR (Melbourne, Victoria)
- 4zzz (Brisbane, Queensland)
- Radio Adelaide (Adelaide, South Australia)
- North West FM (Hadfield, Victoria)

== Freeform radio vs. eclectic radio ==
Eclectic radio describes radio programming encompassing diverse music genres. Unlike freeform radio, the eclectic radio format involves prescribed playlists. While freeform radio stands in contrast to commercial radio formats, a number of commercial radio stations offer programs showcasing an eclectic variety of music. While Eclectic radio, like free-form is mainly limited to North America, the digital radio stations BBC Radio 6 Music and Double J operated by the BBC and the ABC in the UK and Australia respectively resemble attempts at a similar broader format with both having a wide range of music played.

Some eclectic radio stations in the United States are:

- KCRW (Santa Monica, California)
- KEOS (College Station, Texas)
- KEXP (Seattle, Washington)
- KFAI (Minneapolis, Minnesota)
- KGLT (Bozeman, Montana)
- KNYE (Pahrump, Nevada)
- KGSR (Austin, Texas)
- KPIG (Freedom, California)
- KUOM (University of Minnesota, Minneapolis, Minnesota)
- KXUA (Fayetteville, Arkansas)
- WERS (Boston, Massachusetts)
- WHPK (University of Chicago, Chicago, Illinois)
- WJCU (University Heights, Ohio)
- WMLB (Avondale Estates, Georgia)
- WUSM (Hattiesburg, Mississippi)
- WRAS (Atlanta, Georgia)
- WXPN (Philadelphia, Pennsylvania)
- WNCW (Spindale, North Carolina)
- The Loft (Sirius XM)

== See also ==
- Progressive rock (radio format)
- Jack FM/Adult hits (A radio format very similar to the freeform format)
- Album-oriented rock
- Adult album alternative
- Public broadcasting
- Independent radio
- Jim Ladd
- Anything Anything with Rich Russo
- Tom Donahue
- Payola

== Suggested readings ==
The following works are available on the Internet Archive:

- Riding on the Ether Express, a memoir on Freeform Underground Radio at KPPC-FM, Los Angeles, by Dave Pierce
- Rebels on the Air: An Alternative History of Radio in America by Jesse Walker, author/editor
- Waves: Life and Revolution on the FM Dial by Jim Ladd, free-form program host
