= Kīlauea Point Lighthouse =

Lighthouse located on Kauaʻi, Hawaii

Kīlauea Light
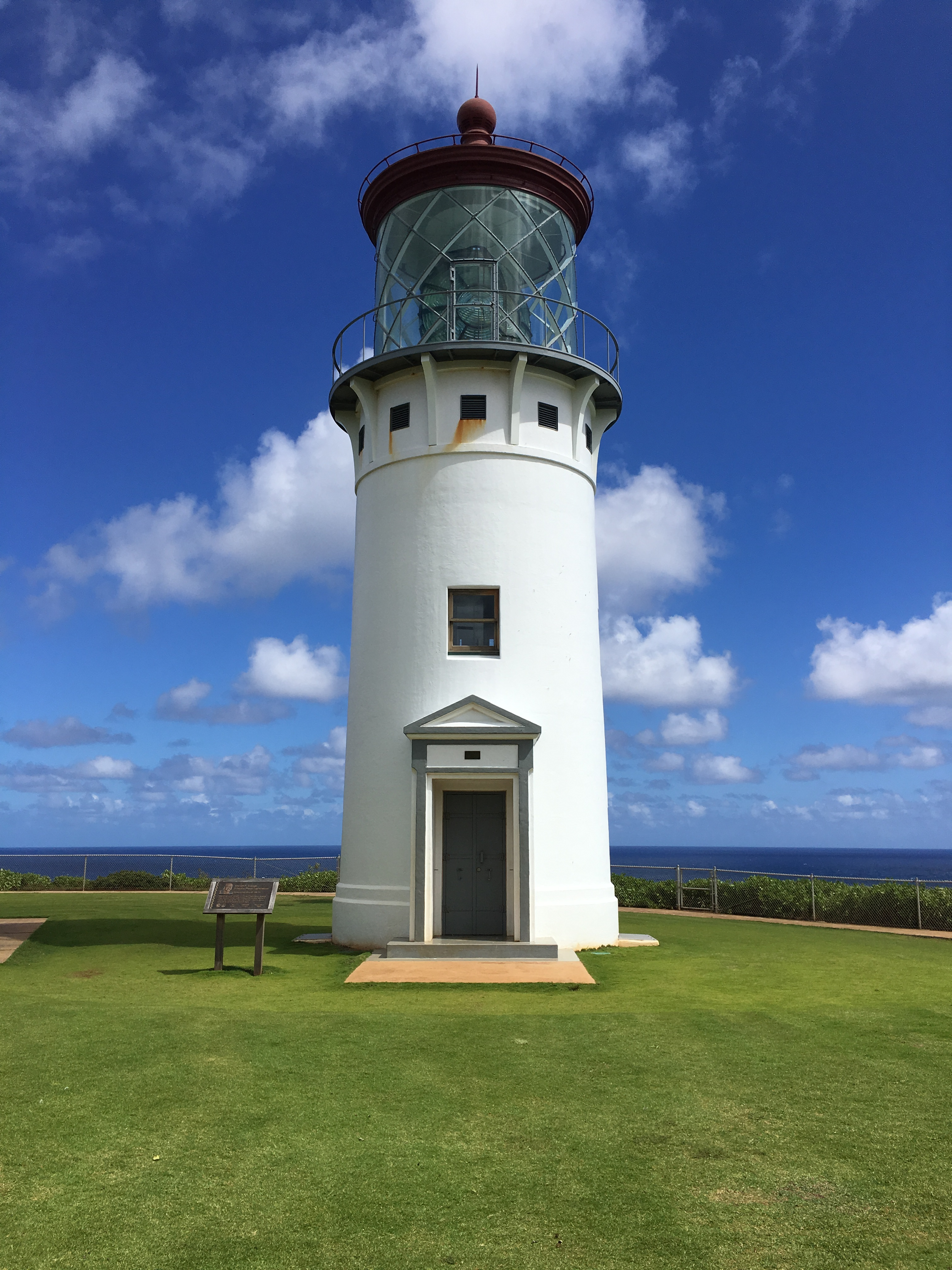
- Kīlauea Lighthouse, 2016
- Location: Kalihiwai, Kauaʻi County, Hawaii
- Coordinates: 22°13′53.8″N 159°24′7.2″W

Tower
- Constructed: 1913
- Construction: reinforced concrete tower
- Automated: mid-1970s
- Height: 52 feet (16 m)
- Shape: cylindrical tower with balcony and lantern
- Markings: white tower, red lantern roof
- Operator: Kīlauea Point National Wildlife Refuge
- Heritage: National Register of Historic Places listed place

Light
- First lit: 1913
- Deactivated: 1976-2013
- Focal height: 174 feet (53 m)
- Lens: Second Order Fresnel, clamshell or "bivalve" shape
- Range: 9 nautical miles (17 km; 10 mi)
- Characteristic: Fl W 10s.
- Daniel K. Inouye Kilauea Point Lighthouse
- U.S. National Register of Historic Places
- Area: 31.4 acres (12.7 ha)
- Built: 1913
- Built by: United States Lighthouse Board
- Architectural style: Bungalow/American craftsman
- MPS: Light Stations of the United States MPS
- NRHP reference No.: 79000759
- Added to NRHP: October 18, 1979

The Daniel K. Inouye Kīlauea Point Lighthouse, also known as Kīlauea Light, is a lighthouse located on Kīlauea Point on the island of Kauaʻi, Hawaiʻi in the Kīlauea Point National Wildlife Refuge.

== History ==
Kīlauea Point, a narrow, lava peninsula protruding from the northern shore of Kauaʻi, was purchased from the Kīlauea Sugar Plantation Company in 1909 for one United States dollar.

Before construction could begin, a method for delivering supplies to the point had to be developed. Due to the lack of good roads from the Nawiliwili harbor, the decision was made to bring the materials in by sea. The lighthouse tender Kukui would anchor offshore and then dispatch small boats with supplies to a cove near the point. Since there was no beach landing, the boats would anchor to cleats cemented into the lava rocks at the point. A boom derrick, constructed on a ledge above the water, would lift the supplies from the boats and place them on a loading platform 110 feet (34 m) above the water.

Finally, after almost four years of planning, construction began in July 1912 and the light was dedicated on May 1, 1913. The tower was built out of reinforced concrete in a Classical Revival architecture style. The tower is a slightly tapering cylinder about 52 feet (16 m) high. The upper portion has a circular steel walkway with a handrail. The lens is one of only seven second-order Fresnel lenses remaining in a lighthouse in the US. Barbier, Bernard, and Turenne manufactured the lens in Paris, France. The 9,000-pound (4,100 kg) lens floated on mercury and compressed air. The lens was rotated by a system of pulleys powered by weights that needed to be reset by an operator every 3.5 hours. An oil storage house was built 155 feet (47 m) southeast of the light, and a small engine house in a small cove below the point. About 1,000 feet (300 m) south is a residential area with three small stone houses. Each house and the lighthouse itself have a water storage tank.

The point is accessed from Route 56 (called Kuhio Highway), north of the town of Kīlauea. On June 29, 1927, the United States Army Air Corps pilots of the airplane Bird of Paradise, Lester J. Maitland and Albert F. Hegenberger, were attempting the first transpacific flight from California to Hawaii. An hour before dawn, aware that they were slightly north of their planned course and with their directional radio receiver not functioning, they spotted the Kīlauea Lighthouse as planned to verify their position.

A radio beacon was added in 1930, and with the added generator the light was changed to be powered by electricity. Originally 250,000 candle power, the light reached 2,500,000 candle power in 1958. The station was staffed until 1974 when it was automated. In February 1976 the light was moved to a nearby smaller tower and the tower was sealed. It was one of the last lights converted to automation by the United States Coast Guard in the Hawaiian Islands. The radio beacon was replaced in 1956, and then in the 1980s converted to a visitor center. It was added to the National Register of Historic Places listings in Hawaii in 1979. The historic district included 31 acres (13 ha).

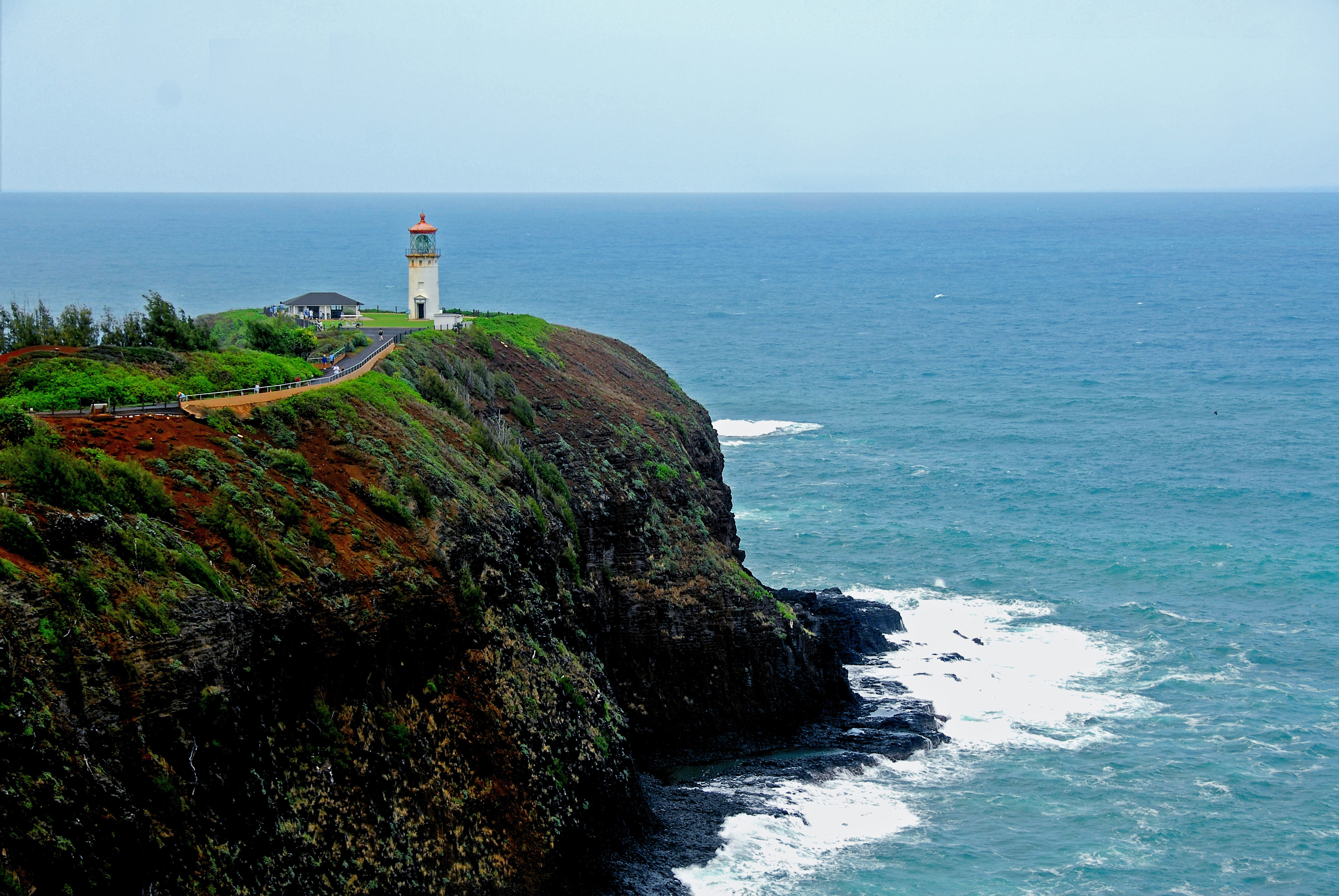
Kilauea Point, 2008

In 1985, the Kīlauea Point National Wildlife Refuge, starting with the original Coast Guard Station, and then expanding to preserve the surrounding habitat. A new visitor center was built in 1988. The buildings were damaged by Hurricane Iniki in September 1992, but repaired. The visitors center is operated by the Kīlauea Point Natural History Association. Starting in late 2008, the group raised funds for the restoration of the lighthouse. The restoration did not restore the lens' structure, as it was designed to float on 260 pounds (120 kg) of mercury so it could be rotated by a weight-driven clock; the later understanding of mercury poisoning made it impractical to be restored. As a result, the lamp is now only lit for ceremonial purposes and does not rotate. On its centennial anniversary on May 1, 2013, the lighthouse was officially renamed in dedication to U.S. Senator Daniel Inouye.

== In popular culture ==
The Kīlauea Lighthouse can be seen briefly in Disney's animated film Lilo & Stitch, and it plays a more important role in its first released sequel, Stitch! The Movie, the pilot film to Lilo & Stitch: The Series. In the film, the lighthouse serves as a rendezvous point where the protagonists are to trade Jumba Jookiba's first 624 experiments (the 625th experiment was taken by Gantu earlier) with the antagonist Dr. Jacques von Hämsterviel for Jumba himself. The lighthouse in the franchise was said in the movie to have shut down years ago due to the financial troubles of keeping it running. Towards the end of the film, however, Experiment 221—an electrical experiment that Lilo names "Sparky"— is given the lighthouse as a new home, and he uses his power to make the beacon shine again. From then on, the lighthouse later makes sporadic appearances throughout The Series and briefly during the finale film Leroy & Stitch, with Sparky continuing to be its only occupant.

The lighthouse appears in the game world of The Crew Motorfest, which added the island of Kauaʻi in 2026.

== See also ==
- List of lighthouses in Hawaii
