= WNJR =

WNJR can refer to:

- WNJR (FM), a radio station (91.7 FM) licensed to Washington, Pennsylvania, United States
- WNSW, a radio station (1430 AM) licensed to Newark, New Jersey, United States which held the WNJR call sign from 1947 until 1999.
