= KRBS =

KRBS may refer to:

- KRBS-LP, a low-power radio station (94.9 FM) licensed to serve Brownsville, Texas, United States
- KOYO-LP, a low-power radio station (107.1 FM) licensed to serve Oroville, California, United States, which held the call sign KRBS-LP from 2001 to 2013

== See also ==
- KRBS Priestfield Stadium
