= Kīlauea Point National Wildlife Refuge =

Seabird nesting site on Kauaʻi Island, Hawaiʻi, U.S.

- IUCN category IV (habitat/species management area)
- Kīlauea Lighthouse Overlook

- Location within Hawaii
- Location: Kauaʻi, Hawaiʻi, United States
- Nearest city: Kilauea, Hawaii
- Coordinates: 22°13′53″N 159°24′07″W
- Area: 203 acres (82 ha)
- Established: 1985
- Governing body: U.S. Fish and Wildlife Service
- Website: Kilauea Point National Wildlife Refuge

Kīlauea Point National Wildlife Refuge is a National Wildlife Refuge on the northwest coast of the island of Kauaʻi in Hawaiʻi.

== History ==
Kīlauea Lighthouse was built in 1913. Kīlauea Point, a narrow, lava peninsula protruding from the northern shore of Kauaʻi, that the lighthouse was built upon was purchased from the Kīlauea Sugar Plantation Company in 1909. In 1976, the Coast Guard deactivated the lighthouse and replaced it with an automatic beacon. In 1979, the lighthouse was placed on the National Register of Historic Places.

The refuge was established in 1985 to preserve and enhance seabird nesting colonies after the property was transferred from the United States Coast Guard. In 1988, the refuge was expanded to include Crater Hill and Mōkōlea Point.

== Management activities ==
Management programs protect the seabird nesting habitat and cooperate with the State of Hawaii to monitor the nēnē population and a newly recruited Newell's shearwater population, among other native Hawaiian seabird species. Management efforts are trapping predators, under contract with Wildlife Services; mowing to provide habitat and food sources for nēnē (Branta sandvicensis); and constructing and maintaining fences to keep feral cats, dogs, rats,mongooses, and pigs out of the refuge. Predator control and a fence line around the perimeter of the refuge provide protection to breeding seabirds and nēnē. The nearly 2-mile fence (3.2 km) protects 168 acres (68 ha). Native and endangered plants are reintroduced and alien species removed. Native coastal plants, such as naupaka (Scaevola spp.), ʻilima (Sida fallax), hala (Pandanus tectorius), ʻāheahea (Chenopodium oahuense), akoko (Euphorbia spp.), have been restored on the refuge. An endangered plant restoration program gives species such as the rare ōlulu (Brighamia insignis) a chance to survive on the point. Habitat management also includes opening and maintaining nesting areas for the recently colonizing Laysan albatross and improving feeding habitat for nēnē.

A volunteer corps of 150 helps in all facets of refuge operations. Invasive-species removal at Kahili Beach (Rock Quarry's), where the Kilauea Stream meets the ocean is an example project.

== Birds ==
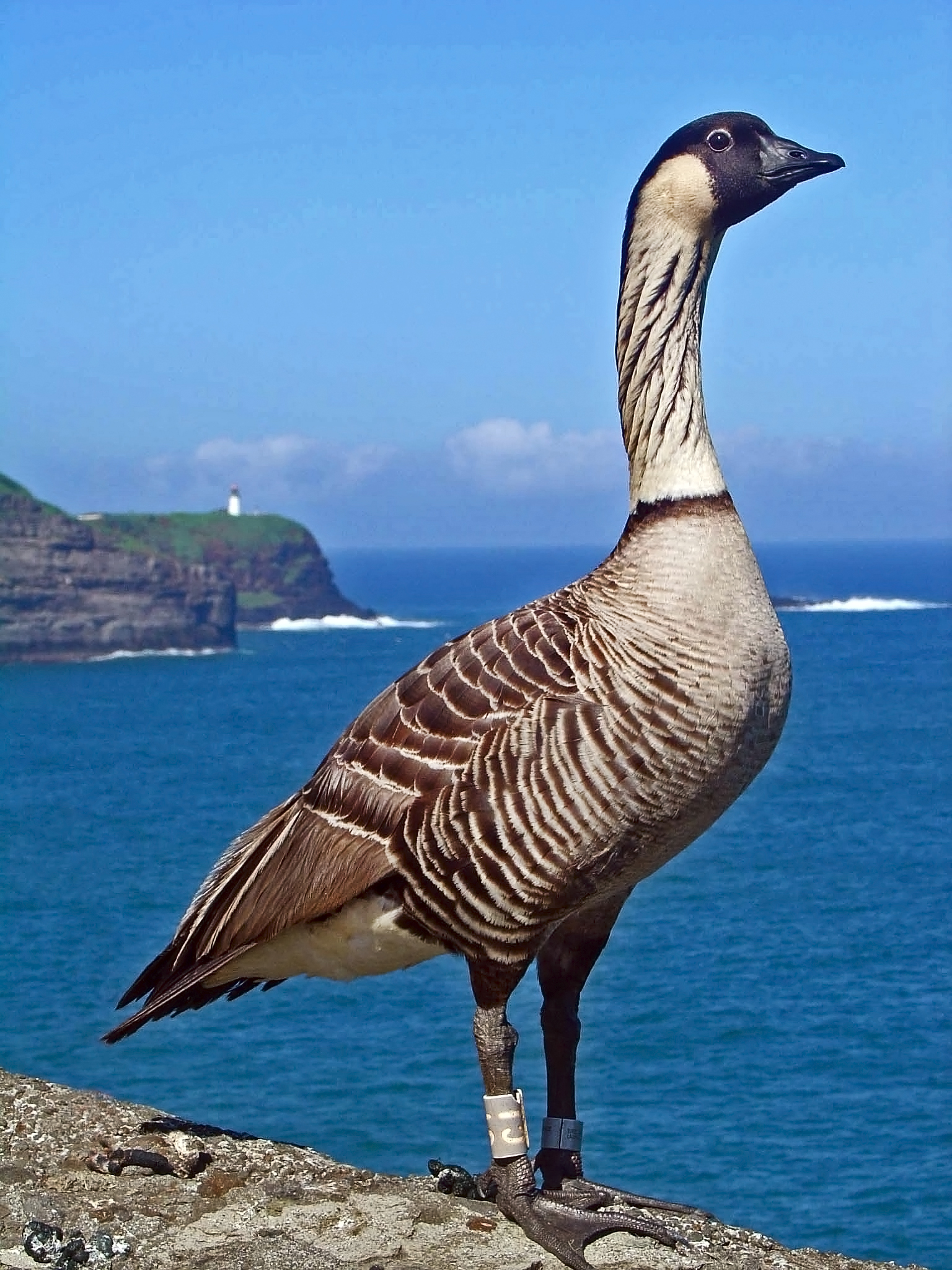
Hawaiian goose and Kīlauea Point peninsula in the background

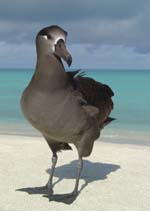
Black-footed albatross - Kilauea Point NWR

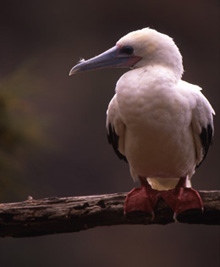
The red-footed booby can be seen year-round on Kilauea Point.

Each year, thousands of migratory seabirds use Kīlauea Point National Wildlife Refuge for nesting, foraging, or resting. Laysan albatrosses, red-footed boobies, brown boobies, red-tailed and white-tailed tropicbirds, great frigatebirds, and wedge-tailed shearwaters all visit the refuge. In addition, migratory shorebirds, such as the kōlea, can be seen August through May. A small population of endangered nēnē were reintroduced on the refuge in the 1990s .

- ʻĀ (red-footed booby, Sula sula) are Kīlauea's most visible seabird. They nest in trees and shrubs, incubating their eggs by covering then with their large, webbed feet. These birds stay closer to land than other Hawaiian seabirds, typically returning to their roosts at night.
- Mōlī (Laysan albatross, Phoebastria immutabilis) navigate across thousands of miles of open ocean to return to their nesting grounds, mostly on remote Pacific islands. They have elaborate courtship rituals, which include sky-pointing, bill-clapping, and bowing. Mōlī can be seen from November to July at Kīlauea Point.
- Kaʻupu (black-footed albatross, Phoebastria nigripes) are large, dark gray seabirds with white around bill and under eye that can occasionally be seen flying off of Kīlauea Point. Unlike the Mōlī, it prefers windswept, sandy spots away from human habitation. A large population of kaʻupu nest on Midway Atoll.
- ʻĀ (brown booby, Sula leucogaster) are frequently sighted fishing offshore and seen roosting along the Nā Pali Coast, but they do not nest on Kauaʻi. In recent years, however, nesting sites have been observed on nearby islands.
- ʻIwa (great frigatebird, Fregata minor) are supremely adapted for flight, with a wingspan of 7 ft (2.1 m). This bird seldom lands on the water because its short legs and long wingspan make it very difficult to take off from the water. The ʻiwa snatches food from the water's surface or forces other birds to drop their catch - earning its Hawaiian language name ʻiwa which translates to "thief". ʻIwa can be seen year-round at Kīlauea Point.
- Koaʻeʻula (red-tailed tropicbird, Phaethon rubricauda) are gull-sized birds with white plumage and long red tail streamers. Koaʻeʻula put on spectacular aerial courtship displays during their breeding season, and nest under shrubs and on cliffs.
- Koaʻeʻkea (white-tailed tropicbird, Phaethon lepturus) are smaller than red-tailed tropicbirds. They nest on cliffs and can also be seen at Waimea Canyon and Nā Pali Coast State Parks on Kauaʻi. They are gull-sized birds have white plumage and long tail streamers.
- Nēnē (Hawaiian goose, Branta sandvicensis) have dark furrows on their cream colored necks, long legs, and reduced foot webbing. They feed on tender leaves, grasses, and berries. Nēnē disappeared from Kauaʻi 100 years ago. With the escape of captive pairs into the wild in 1982 and active reintroduction efforts, they are now making a comeback.
- Kōlea (Pacific golden plover, Pluvialis fulva) migrate to Hawaiʻi in the fall from their arctic breeding grounds. These shorebirds establish winter feeding territories on lawns and golf courses and natural habitats in open fields. Kōlea have a habit of running in short bursts, then stopping to search for insects. The kōlea can be seen from August to April on Kauaʻi.
- Uaʻuʻkani (wedge-tailed shearwater, Puffinus pacificus) spend the winter at sea, traveling as far as the Gulf of Panama, and return to Hawaiʻi in the spring to breed. They nest in burrows that provide protection from predators and intense tropical weather. Adults leave the colony by day to fish and return at dusk to feed their chicks. At night, courting shearwaters make eerie moaning sounds, which inspired their Hawaiian name ʻuaʻuʻkani. ʻUaʻuʻkani can be seen from March to November.
- ʻAʻo (Newell's shearwater, Puffinus newelli) is a medium-sized shearwater measuring 12–14 in (30–36 cm) with a wing span of 30–35 in (76–89 cm). It has a glossy black back and white belly and a black bill that is sharply hooked at the tip. Its claws are well adapted for burrow excavation and climbing.
- ʻUlili (wandering tattler, Tringa incana) is about the same size as the kōlea, 11 in (28 cm) from bill to tail. They are slate-gray in color with very yellow legs.
- ʻAkekeke (ruddy turnstone, Arenaria interpres) is a small shorebird easily identified by the bold black and white pattern on its wings, and its black "necklace". Named for its feeding behavior, the ruddy turnstone uses its strong neck and bill to turn over stones in search of prey. It can be seen year round on Kauaʻi but is abundant in spring and fall.

== Other Wildlife ==
- Groups of naiʻa (spinner dolphin, Stenella longirostris) play close to shore in spring and summer, entertaining visitors with leaps and spins.
- Endangered koholā (humpback whale, Megaptera novaeangliae), which migrate from Alaska to Hawaiʻi each year to mate, give birth, and rear their young, swim offshore from December to April. Koholā can be seen offshore of Kīlauea Point from November to April. Prime time for whale watching is between January and March.
- ʻIlio-holo-i-ka-uaua (Hawaiian monk seal, Monachus schauinslandi) can occasionally be seen hauling out on rocks below the cliffs. Most of these endangered seals live in the remote northwestern area of the Hawaiian Islands and are a rare sight on Hawaiʻi's main islands.
- Honu (green turtle, Chelonia mydas) sometimes bob in the waves below Kīlauea Point. Although turtles may be seen mating in Kauaʻi waters, honu typically mate and nest at the place of their birth in the French Frigate Shoals in the Northwestern Hawaiian Islands.
