= KBMF-LP =

Community radio station in Butte, Montana

- Butte, Montana; United States
- Broadcast area: Butte-Silver Bow
- Frequency: 102.5 MHz
- Branding: KBMF

Programming
- Language: English
- Format: Free-form community radio
- Affiliations: Pacifica Radio Network

Ownership
- Owner: Butte America Foundation

History
- First air date: June 13, 2015
- Call sign meaning: "Butte America Foundation"

Technical information
- Licensing authority: FCC
- Facility ID: 192251
- Class: L1
- ERP: 0.1 kW
- HAAT: −23.3286 meters (−76.537 ft)
- Transmitter coordinates: 46°0′50.7″N 112°32′19.0″W

Links
- Public license information: LMS
- Webcast: Listen live
- Website: butteamericaradio.org

KBMF-LP (102.5 FM) is a non-commercial low-power community radio station that broadcasts terrestrially from a transmitter atop the historic Carpenters' Union Hall in Uptown Butte, Montana.

Broadcasting 24/7, the station showcases 60+ unique freeform music programs, two one-hour weekly news programs, and a variety of community programs. KBMF-LP's FCC licensee is Butte America Foundation (BAmF), a nonprofit 501(c)(3) organization. The station's slogan is "America's Most Radio".

== History ==
KBMF-LP 102.5 FM was established as the flagship project of the Butte America Foundation in August 2013. Filing of the initial construction permit was delayed by the 2013 United States federal government shutdown, but the permit was awarded in January 2014. After 18 months of fundraising and planning, including the "100 for 100 campaign," wherein 100 supporters donated $100 each, the Butte America Foundation filed for a broadcast license with the call letters KBMF-LP. The station first went on the air on Miners' Union Day, June 13, 2015.

The radio station's training procedures and freeform ethos were modeled after KBGA 89.9 FM in Missoula, Montana, the college radio station for the University of Montana. KBMF-LP's founding general manager Clark Grant was manager of KBGA from 2011-2012 and drew heavily from established procedures and methods developed over that radio station's history.

The Butte America Foundation board of directors at the time of KBMF-LP's launch included founding board president Amanda Curtis, as well as Ann Szalda-Petree, who would later become president of Missoula Community Radio.

== Programming ==
=== News ===
Among the topics on its news programs are local politics and environmental issues. As a consequence of more than one hundred years of intensive mining, Butte is part of the largest Environmental Protection Agency Superfund site in the United States.

A$30,000 grant from the NEH allows KBMF-LP to produce a series of documentaries that explore Butte's century-old mining history. Another interview series, "Let's Talk Butte," airs local interviews and oral history excerpts that explore Butte's multicultural heritage. Additionally, KBMF-LP live broadcasts Butte-Silver Bow's weekly City Council meetings and five afternoons a week airs Native America Calling.

KBMF-LP regularly updates an archive of past news programming.

== Support ==
A non-commercial educational (NCE) station, KBMF-LP broadcasts 24/7 thanks to an avid volunteer DJ community, ongoing financial support from listeners (both terrestrial and streaming), and several grants. Grants to date have come from the National Endowment for the Humanities (NEH), the Ford Foundation, the Superfund Advisory and Redevelopment Trust (SARTA), BNSF Railway Foundation, Montana History Foundation, Staples Foundation, and others.

== Media ==
=== Al Jazeera ===
Less than a year after KBMF-LP first began broadcasting, a team from Al Jazeera English traveled to Butte to interview members of the KBMF-LP team.

=== Standing Rock pipeline protests ===
During the fall and winter of 2016-17, KBMF-LP news team members traveled three times to the Standing Rock Sioux reservation in North Dakota covering the Dakota Access Pipeline protests on the Standing Rock Sioux reservation in North Dakota. KBMF-LP subsequently aired interviews with members of the Oceti Sakowin tribe, as well as academics, activists and researchers visiting the camp from around the world. Additionally, more than forty newspapers published a syndicated story by a KBMF-LP news team member that detailed actions by armed forces at Backwater Bridge on the night of November 20, 2016.

=== Nongoma, South African global partner ===
In an ongoing cultural exchange, Prince Sbo Zulu and three representatives of community radio station Nongoma-FM 88.3 in the South African province of KwaZulu-Natal have twice visited Butte, Montana spending several months each visit working at KBMF-LP and engaging in a state-wide cultural exchange. In 2017-18, four representatives of KBMF-LP subsequently visited Nongoma for two months, working with the African station and learning about Zulu culture and aspirations. KBMF-LP and Nongoma-FM continue to share a dedication to ongoing community education and empowerment in the name of social justice.

=== Historic preservation ===
KBMF-LP and BAmF are headquartered at the Carpenters' Union Hall, the oldest operating labor temple in Montana. Built in 1906, at the peak of Butte's architectural heyday, the three-story building was in great disrepair. KBMF-LP and BAmF volunteers are gradually refurbishing the historic building.
