= WGDH =

- Hardwick, Vermont; United States
- Broadcast area: Central Vermont
- Frequency: 91.7 MHz

Programming
- Format: Freeform
- Affiliations: Pacifica Radio; BBC World Service

Ownership
- Owner: Central Vermont Community Radio Corporation
- Sister stations: WGDR

History
- First air date: March 2011
- Call sign meaning: GodDard Hardwick

Technical information
- Licensing authority: FCC
- Facility ID: 173961
- Class: A
- ERP: 1,100 watts
- HAAT: 40 meters (130 ft)
- Transmitter coordinates: 44°34′50.8″N 72°27′13.7″W

Links
- Public license information: Public file; LMS
- Webcast: Listen Live
- Website: wgdr.org

WGDH (91.7 FM) is a non-commercial educational American radio station that serves the community of Hardwick, Vermont, United States and the surrounding areas of Lamoille, Washington and Caledonia counties. The station, launched in 2011, is owned by Central Vermont Community Radio Corporation.

WGDH is a hybrid community/public radio station, broadcasting a freeform radio format, simulcasting with its sister station WGDR (91.1 FM) in nearby Plainfield, Vermont. The station began broadcasting on February 23, 2011, initially at half-power, or 550 watts, and was originally licensed to Goddard College Corporation. Full-power broadcasting at 1,100 watts began on March 7, 2011, six days after the Federal Communications Commission granted the station an operating license on March 1, replacing its original construction permit that was issued on April 9, 2008. The station was assigned the call sign WGDH by the FCC on October 8, 2009.

A community party to celebrate the launch of the station was held on April 9, 2011, at The Hardwick Town House in Hardwick. The event was televised live by Hardwick Community Access Television.

Goddard College donated the licenses for WGDH and sister station WGDR to Central Vermont Community Radio Corporation effective May 10, 2021.

== See also ==
- List of community radio stations in the United States
