= The Saturday Light Brigade =

- Running time: 6 hours
- Country of origin: United States
- Language(s): English
- Starring: Larry Berger
- Created by: Larry Berger
- Recording studio: Children's Museum of Pittsburgh; Pittsburgh, Pennsylvania
- Original release: 1978
- Website: slbradio.org

The Saturday Light Brigade is a public radio program featuring acoustic music and family programming including participatory puzzles and games as well as on-air telephone calls from children and adults. Broadcast since 1978, it is one of the longest-running public radio programs in the United States.

The Saturday Light Brigade is broadcast live from 6:00 a.m. to 12:00 noon (Eastern) on Saturday mornings and airs on WRCT in Pittsburgh, Pennsylvania, WSAJ in Grove City, Pennsylvania, WNJR in Washington, PA, WCUC in Clarion, PA, WIUP in Indiana, PA, WMCO in New Concord, Ohio, and WOHM in Charleston, South Carolina.

The program is broadcast by SLB Radio Productions, Inc., a 501(c)(3) not-for-profit corporation governed by a board of directors and advisory board. Day-to-day operations are managed by Larry and Rikki Berger.

SLB is a member of the National Federation of Community Broadcasters and Association of Independents in Radio.

== History ==
Larry Berger originated the program on WYEP in Pittsburgh in March 1978 and was soon joined by sidekick/producer Bill Lucker. SLB Radio Productions, Inc., was formed in 2000 to guide the program's growth and ensure focus on its mission of encouraging genuine expression in and among children and adults. In 2001, SLB and Children's Museum of Pittsburgh entered into an agreement whereby SLB would move its offices and studios to the soon-to-be expanded museum. Lucker elected to take a sabbatical in early 2003 and remained involved on the Advisory Board. He died in 2008 after a courageous fight with cancer. In November 2003, SLB moved its Pittsburgh affiliation from WYEP to WRCT. The museum studios opened in November 2004 and are now the site of live broadcasts and off-air workshops.
