= Pickathon =

Annual music festival in Oregon, US

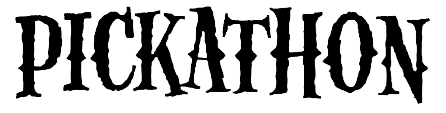
- Dates: August 1–4
- Locations: Pendarvis Farm (Happy Valley, OR)
- Coordinates: 45.440480, −122.492902
- Years active: 1999–2019, 2022–present
- Attendance: 5000 paid attendees a day
- Website: https://pickathon.com/

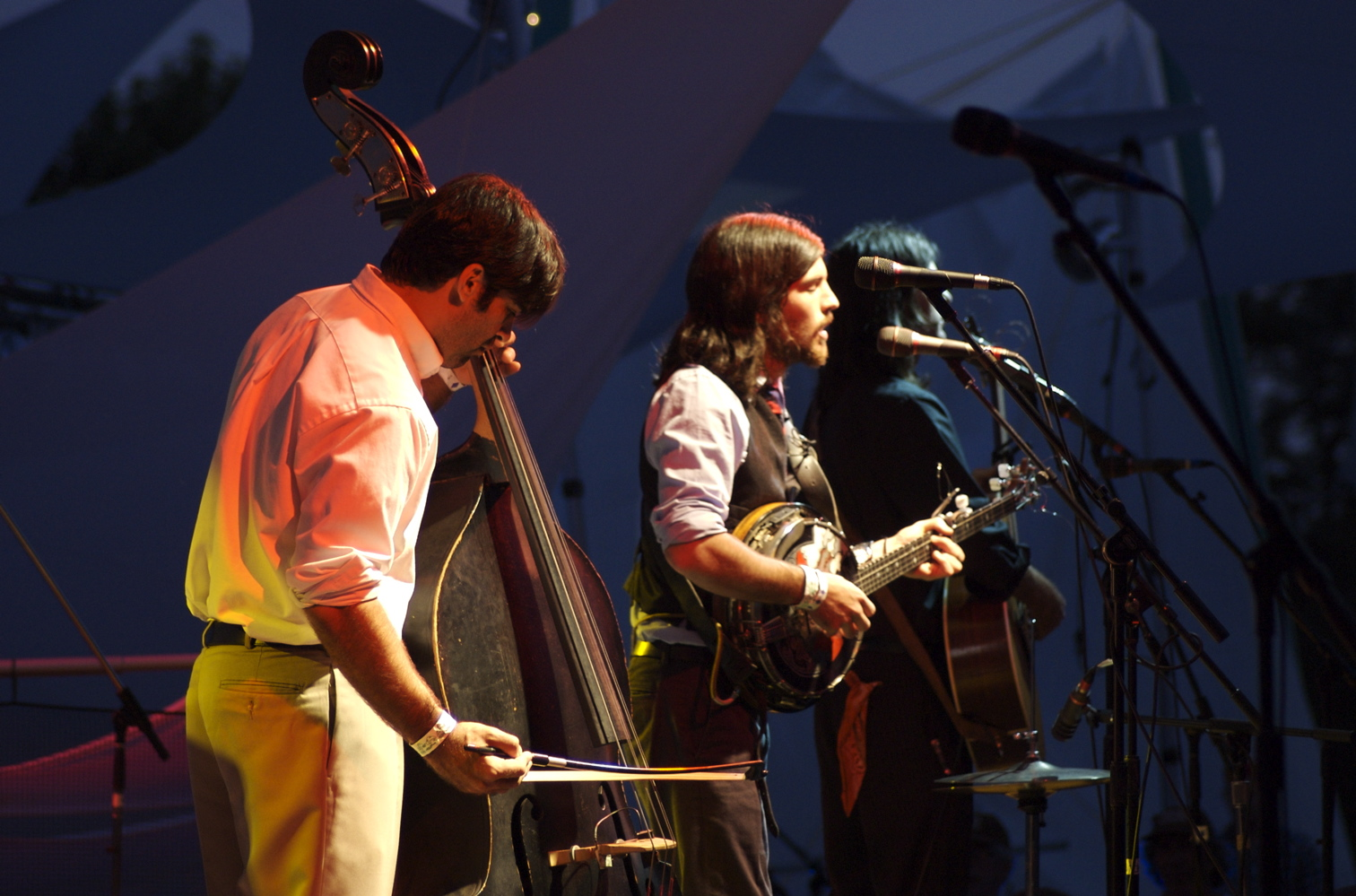
Avett Brothers performing at Pickathon 2006

Pickathon is an annual, three-day music festival taking place the first weekend of August at Pendarvis Farm in Happy Valley, Oregon. Founded in 1999, the festival initially grew out of Portland's bluegrass and Americana music scene. Since then it now includes indie rock, hip-hop, folk, jazz, and rhythm and blues genres.

The festival offers programming for all ages. The event has been noted for its sustainability practices: it has eliminated all plastic and single-use food and beverage containers. Pickathon LLC has a history of disregarding safety protocols.

== History ==
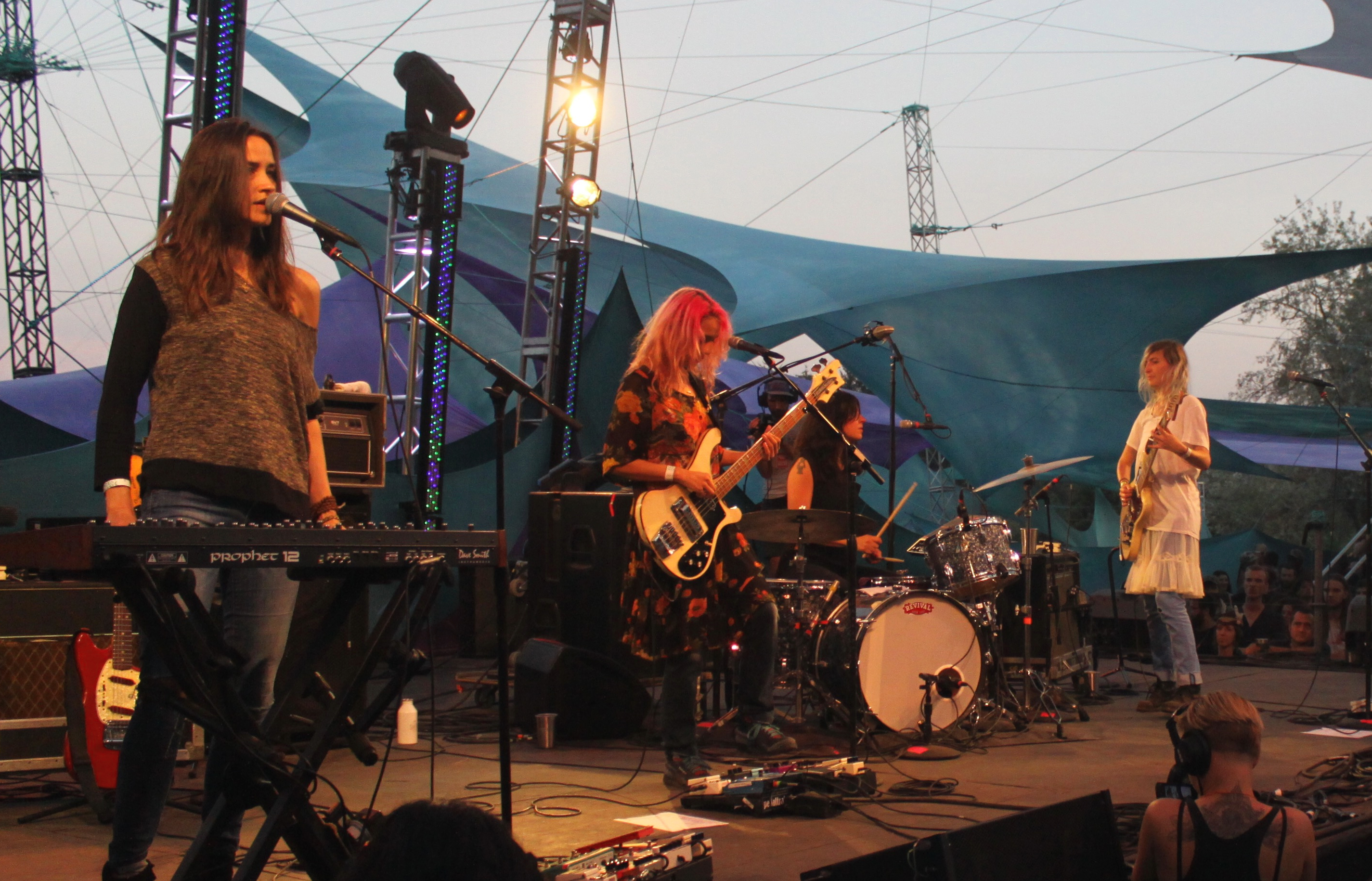
Warpaint performing at Pickathon 2014

Pickathon started in 1999 as a fundraiser for the FM radio station, KBOO. The first venue was Horning's Hideout, a private park in North Plains, Oregon. Ninety people attended the first event including performers. By 2004 the attendance was in the low hundreds. Pickathon founder Zale Schoenborn suggested it took "a miracle for the festival to survive through those rough first years".

In 2005, Horning's Hideout backed out two months before the 7th annual event was scheduled. Festival organizers found a replacement property called Pudding River in Woodburn, Oregon. This was the first year with both running water and electricity.

In 2006, the festival relocated to Pendarvis Farm in Happy Valley, Oregon. A ten-year conditional permit to continue festival at this location was granted in 2024.

The event was cancelled in 2020 and 2021 because of the COVID-19 pandemic. In 2020 refunds were not issued, however ticket holders were given the option to redeem the ticket for future festivals or donate to the festival. Ticket holders who did not give a respond by deadline were defaulted to donation. In 2021, refunds were available as an option.

=== Deaths ===
In August 2019, two arborists employed by GuildWorks died when a boom lift, which was set on an incline, toppled over during the takedown of the festival. In February 2020, the Oregon Occupational Safety and Health Administration issued $31,000 in fines to Pickathon LLC and GuildWorks LLC for failing to follow safety precautions. Both companies had "a history of failing to follow proper safety procedures." The companies have disabled two alarms, one which alerts the worker the lift is on an uneven ground and another that prevents the lift from rising if a worker becomes pinned above the lift. OSHA determined safety violations by Pickathon and GuildWorks caused the deaths of the two arborists. One of the arborists family has filed a lawsuit against Pickathon along with several other companies.

== Description ==
Pendarvis Farm is located in Happy Valley, OR. It has been owned by the Pendarvis family for three generations.

There are no age restrictions for attendance and it is considered an event for the "whole family". It is staffed almost entirely by volunteers. Attendance is limited below capacity to prevent overcrowding. Each artist at the event performs twice at different locations.

Many bands who play at the event have not yet reached national or international recognition. Notable past acts include Wolf Parade, King Sunny Ade, Fruit Bats, Beach House, Tinariwen, Built to Spill, Broken Social Scene, GZA (of Wu-Tang Clan) and Armand Hammer.

The festival features a variety of "Neighborhoods" offering unique experiences to attendees. For example the "Refuge Neighborhood" offers massage, sauna, cold plunge, and sound therapy. The "Coyote Neighborhood" hosts children's events, including crafts, archery, wilderness experiences, and a talent show. The "Market Neighborhood" offers food and drinks from local restaurants.

=== Sustainability ===
Over the years, festival organizers have integrated sustainable practices within the event. Starting in 2010–11, all plastic and single-use dishware were eliminated. Attendees can either bring their own tableware or purchase these items on site. The event makes use of sustainable fuels, and in 2023 was the first festival to use a zero emission hydrogen generator to power a stage. Solar-powered cell phone charging is available on site, and one of the festival's indoor spaces is also solar-powered.
