= Rustbelt Radio =

Weekly radio program in Pennsylvania, US

- Genre: News, Current affairs
- Running time: 1 hour
- Home station: WRCT 88.3FM Pittsburgh
- Syndicates: WPTS-FM, WDUQ-LP, WNJR, WIUP-FM, WKCO-FM, WOBC-FM
- Produced by: Pittsburgh Indymedia collective members
- Original release: May 2004 – present
- No. of episodes: 150+
- Website: http://radio.indypgh.org
- Podcast: Rustbelt Radio

Rustbelt Radio is the Pittsburgh Independent Media Center's weekly radio program which introduces itself as "news from the grassroots, news overlooked by the corporate media".

== Production ==
Rustbelt Radio is produced by a volunteer collective working primarily in the Pittsburgh area. Volunteers conduct interviews and record events. They then edit the audio using Audacity, a free and open-source digital audio editor. The show is organized each week using a wiki in a collaborative process. The show is produced, recorded and aired live on Monday evenings from the studios of WRCT-FM.
