= KKCR =

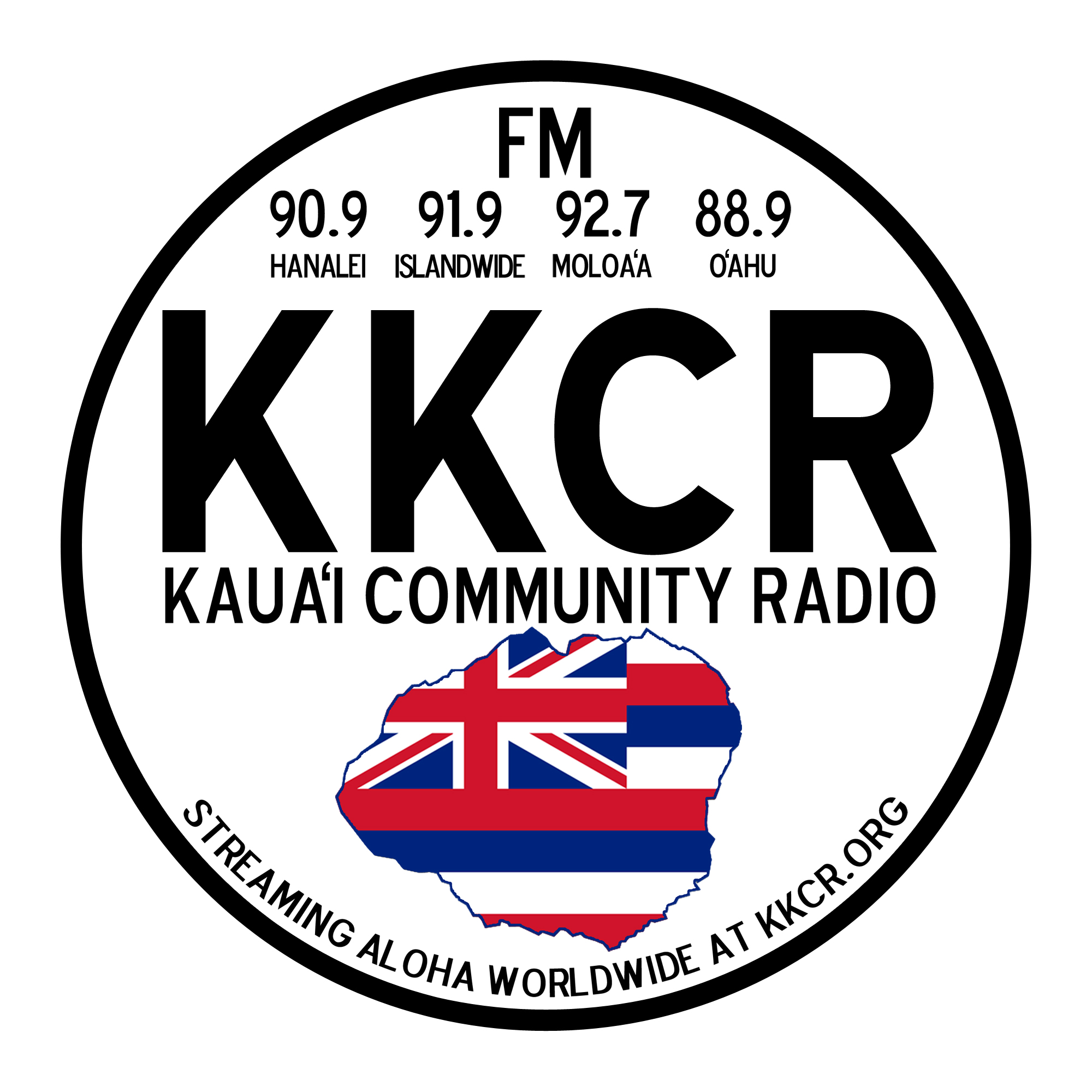
- Hanalei, Hawaii; United States
- Broadcast area: Islands of Kauaʻi and Oʻahu
- Frequency: 90.9 MHz
- Branding: Kauaʻi Community Radio

Programming
- Language: Hawaiian Pidgin
- Format: Variety
- Affiliations: Pacifica Radio Network

Ownership
- Owner: Kekahu Foundation, Inc.; (Kekahu Foundation, Inc.)

History
- Founded: April 14, 1994
- First air date: July 4, 1997
- Call sign meaning: Kauaʻi Community Radio

Technical information
- Licensing authority: FCC
- Facility ID: 33827
- Class: A
- ERP: 900 watts
- HAAT: −94 meters (−308 ft)
- Transmitter coordinates: 22°12′50.10″N 159°28′42.90″W
- Translator: See § Repeaters
- Repeater: See § Repeaters

Links
- Public license information: Public file; LMS
- Webcast: Listen live
- Website: www.kkcr.org

KKCR (90.9 FM) is a community radio station broadcasting a variety format including Hawaiian, jazz, blues, R&B, rock, reggae, classical and world artists as well as locally produced talk programs. Licensed to the Kekahu Foundation in Hanalei, Hawaii, United States, the station serves the island of Kauaʻi and parts of Oahu. The station is owned by the Kekahu Foundation, Inc.

The idea for KKCR originated in the late '80s. Janet Friend, Roy Richardson, Richard Fernandez, Jon and Lorraine Scott, and other Island residents decided to start a radio station that would serve Island residents, withstand extreme weather conditions and provide emergency information to isolated residents. The station provides one of the primary Emergency Alert System signals on Kauaʻi.

== Repeaters ==
Call sign	Frequency	City of license	Facility ID	Class	ERP (W)	Height (m (ft))	Transmitter coordinates
KAQA	91.9 FM	Kilauea, Hawaii	33826	C1	6,000 horizontal	533.4 m (1,750 ft)	21°58′24.30″N 159°29′44.60″W

=== Translators and boosters ===
Call sign	Frequency	City of license	FID	ERP (W)	HAAT	Class	FCC info	Notes
KAQA-FM1	91.9 FM	Kilauea, Hawaii	90090	95	80 m (262 ft)	D	LMS	KAQA booster
K224CQ	92.7 FM	Anahola, Hawaii	146232	250	31.5 m (103 ft)	D	LMS	KAQA Repeater
K205FM	88.9 FM	Honolulu, Hawaii	84395	10	678 m (2,224 ft)	D	LMS	KAQA Repeater

KKCR also broadcasts on radio station KAQA 91.9 MHz Kauaʻi, KAQA's FM booster 92.7 MHz via translator K224CQ in Anahola, Hawaii and 88.9 MHz via translator K205FM in Honolulu, Hawaii.

== See also ==
- List of community radio stations in the United States
