= KDRT-LP =

- Davis, California; United States
- Frequency: 95.7 MHz

Programming
- Language: English
- Format: Community Radio
- Affiliations: Pacifica Radio Network

Ownership
- Owner: Davis Community Television DBA Davis Media Access

History
- First air date: 2003; 23 years ago
- Former frequencies: 101.5 MHz (2003–2013)
- Call sign meaning: Davis (Community) Radio & Television

Technical information
- Licensing authority: FCC
- Facility ID: 123794
- Class: L1
- ERP: 99 watts
- HAAT: 15.2 meters
- Transmitter coordinates: 38°32′57″N 121°43′50″W

Links
- Public license information: LMS
- Website: kdrt.org

KDRT is a low-power radio station (LPFM) broadcasting at 95.7 FM in Davis, California, and streaming worldwide via KDRT.org. As a noncommercial community station, KDRT's mission is to inspire, enrich, and entertain listeners through an eclectic mix of music, cultural, educational, and public-affairs programs and services.

Since launching on September 24, 2004, KDRT has had a significant impact in and around Davis through live programs featuring local artists and news, including the area's only COVID-focused reporting. The first LPFM station to be launched within a public-access media center – Davis Media Access – KDRT staff and volunteers have since advised many LPFM startups, and in 2021, KDRT received the national Overall Excellence for Small Radio Stations award from the Alliance for Community Media.

While many programmers at KDRT are new to community radio, several volunteers and staff bring a range of experience and expertise from other broadcasting stations, such as CapRadio, CBS Sacramento, KCRA, KDVS, KFJC, KMPC, KRSH, KUNM, KVMR, and WCQS. KDRT welcomes volunteers in both on-air and off-air roles.

== See also ==
- List of community radio stations in the United States
