= KBOO =

Community radio station in Portland, Oregon

- Portland, Oregon; United States
- Broadcast area: Portland Metropolitan area
- Frequency: 90.7 MHz (HD Radio)
- Branding: K-Boo

Programming
- Format: Community – free-form radio
- Affiliations: Pacifica Radio Network

Ownership
- Owner: KBOO Foundation

History
- First air date: June 3, 1968
- Call sign meaning: Berkeley Boo (a strain of marijuana)

Technical information
- Licensing authority: FCC
- Facility ID: 65755
- Class: C1
- ERP: 26,500 watts
- HAAT: 386 meters (1,266 ft)
- Transmitter coordinates: 45°29′20″N 122°41′40″W
- Translators: 91.9 K220HR (Hood River); 104.3 K282BH (Philomath)

Links
- Public license information: Public file; LMS
- Webcast: Listen live
- Website: www.kboo.fm

KBOO (90.7 MHz) is a non-commercial, listener-supported, community radio station in Portland, Oregon. The station is volunteer driven with a small paid staff that airs a free-form radio format. The station owns its own building located in SE Portland on SE 8th Ave. KBOO's mission is to promote equity, creativity and education while providing access to the airwaves for oppressed and underserved communities.

KBOO is a Class C1 FM station, it has an effective radiated power (ERP) of 26,500 watts, with its transmitter on SW Fairmont Court on Portland's West Hills. KBOO is also heard on two FM translators: in Philomath, Oregon at 104.3 FM and in Hood River, at 91.9 FM.

== History ==
=== Building the station (1964–1968) ===
A group of Portlanders, unsatisfied with the choices offered by local radio stations, organized themselves as "Portland Listener Supported Radio" in 1964. They approached Lorenzo Milam, a former volunteer at Pacifica Radio's KPFA in Berkeley, who helped start KRAB, a now-defunct community station in Seattle.

Milam agreed to help them organize a station, and after a series of meetings, Portland Listener Supported Radio applied for a license for a Portland radio station. Milam asked KRAB volunteer David Calhoun if he'd be willing to help organize the new station in Portland. Calhoun, an ex-monk and third-year medical student, packed his VW with a transmitter from Seattle and moved south.

Sleeping on couches and struggling to find meals, Calhoun and other volunteers including Gray Haertig (who continues to volunteer currently) put together the resources needed for a community radio station. A basement room was donated on Third Street and Salmon Street in downtown Portland. The space was barely big enough for two tape recorders, one turntable, and Calhoun. A diverse mix of about thirty volunteers came together to help out, including society women, movement radicals, professional broadcast engineers, and musicians.

=== On the air (1968-1971) ===
KBOO Community Radio signed on the air on June 3, 1968. The cost was less than $4,000. The total monthly station budget was about $50. The total output initially was only ten watts, a fraction of the current output. The call sign makes reference to a strain of marijuana called "Berkeley Boo".

Initially, KBOO was on the air when volunteers were available to flip a switch and activate the repeater signal from KRAB. But almost immediately, the station began to grow. KBOO volunteers lugged big Ampex tape recorders to concerts, political events, and neighborhood meetings; nationally recognized artists and activists were brought into the KBOO studio. Local poets discovered the electronic outlet.

By the summer of 1970, a used 1,000-watt transmitter was installed, enabling KBOO's audience and subscriptions to grow. KBOO could be heard in much of Northwest Oregon.

After three years, KBOO outgrew its studio and moved to a storefront at 3129 SE Belmont Street. Walls of the makeshift studios were lined with egg cartons for sound insulation, and all employees shared just two desks.

=== Incorporation and stability (1972–1982) ===
By 1972, the non-profit KBOO Foundation was born, with an interim five-member board of directors. The umbilical cord to KRAB was being cut. By 1973, the staff had grown to five, with about 50 active volunteers. About 600 subscribers donated an average of $20 a year. Station Manager John Ross got an $80,000 federal grant to help purchase equipment.

In 1975, the 800-strong KBOO Foundation elected its first board of directors. The KBOO Foundation and its officers got the license and ownership of the station. KBOO became fully independent of KRAB and its parent, the Jack Straw Memorial Foundation. After 10 years, KBOO had come of age.

The station moved again, in 1977, to SW Yamhill Street, and soon expanded broadcasting to 24 hours a day on a regularly scheduled basis. KBOO was broadcasting at 12,500 watts. Rapid growth came to KBOO in its new downtown location. Subscribers soared from 1,200 in early 1978 to well above 2,000 by 1980. About 300 volunteers gave KBOO one of the strongest volunteer programs in the nation.

In 1981, urban renewal in downtown Portland forced a search for a new home. KBOO found its present location at 20 SE 8th Avenue (the little Robin's egg blue building half a block south of East Burnside Street behind the Jupiter Hotel and Doug Fir Lounge). Through a massive volunteer effort, a new station was built in 1982 in an empty warehouse. For the first time, KBOO would own its own home.

=== Expansion (1982–present) ===
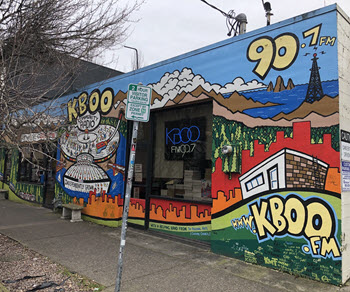
KBOO's offices and studios in Portland.

In the early '80s, KBOO broadened its commitment to multicultural programming. New Spanish and Asian-language programs were added. A strip of African-American musical programming was added in 1981. A Hispanic strip followed in 1984. News and Public Affairs Director Ross Reynolds and volunteers teamed up to organize a nightly newscast, supplemented by a new wire service and national newscast from Pacifica Radio, which proudly continues to air to this day. A new station, KMUN, was launched in Astoria through KBOO's help, much as KRAB had nurtured KBOO. Funds were raised to purchase the new building and KBOO was in the black for the first time in memory.

In 1986, the building was purchased. Power was boosted to 23 kW, and KBOO began broadcasting in stereo for the first time. A major federal grant in 1987 allowed purchase of new studio equipment. A satellite dish was added on the roof, and the station bought a remote transmitter, allowing live remote broadcasts of community events.

In the early 1990s, KBOO set up translators in Corvallis (broadcasting at 100.7 FM) and in White Salmon, Washington (broadcasting at 91.9 FM), allowing KBOO's signal to be received from the very northern tip of Eugene to The Dalles, on a good day. In 2013, the Corvallis translator moved slightly, to Philomath, where it still reaches Corvallis and now parts of Eugene, at 104.3 FM.

In the summer of 1991, KBOO moved its transmitter to a new location on the 600-foot (180 m) KGON tower (also known as Stonehenge) on Portland's West Hills. This increase of 300 feet (91 m) gave KBOO much greater range. KBOO's effective radiated power was boosted to 26.5 kW. Reports from jubilant listeners came in from the coast and outskirts of Eugene, saying they were hearing KBOO clearly for the first time.

As of February 2022, the station had about 9,200 members. The station runs pledge drives twice each year. The annual KBOO budget in 2022 was about $900,000, but compared to 2021's audit, KBOO saw a drop-off of more than $150,000 in grants and donations. The station is operating at a deficit and had to lay off five staff members in October 2024.

=== "Stairway to Heaven" ===
As a listener-funded station, KBOO runs a variety of fundraising events. They once promised that, for a donation of $10,000, the station would never play Led Zeppelin's "Stairway To Heaven" again. One listener accepted the offer. After performing at a concert at the Aladdin Theater, Robert Plant, who is a singer for Led Zeppelin was driving to the Oregon Coast and station-surfing, and the offer was repeated while Plant was lingering on the station. He liked the idea and decided to accept. He pulled over to use a pay-phone to call and make a $10,000 pledge, which he says he did using the credit card of Atco Records president Herb Abramson.

== Programming ==
KBOO offers a mix of music and entertainment programs along with public affairs shows which are informative and sometimes controversial. The focus is on independent content, voices and perspectives that are not typically heard on mainstream media. Public affairs programs include: Old Mole Variety Hour, Prison Pipeline, Art Focus, Film at 11, Locus Focus, The Dirtbag, The Bike Show and Rose City Native Radio.

KBOO delivers a volunteer-produced newscast every evening, and election coverage. It has hosted the Walt Curtis poetry show Talking Earth since 1971. KBOO also broadcasts syndicated programs, such as Democracy Now!, For The Wild, Ecojustice Radio and First Voices Radio.

Music programs on the platform include genres such as hip-hop, adult album alternative rock (AAA), electronica, experimental, chill-out, folk, jazz, and Latin music.

Special programming events have included live remote broadcasts of music festivals such as PDX Pop Now!, Pickathon, and the annual Waterfront Blues Festival.

According to the KBOO Programming Charter, "KBOO shall fill the needs that other media outlets do not, providing programming to diverse communities and unserved or underserved groups" and "shall provide access and training to those communities."

KBOO hosted the Grassroots Radio Coalition's 13th annual Grassroots Radio Conference. The conference was held July 24–27, 2008, at Portland State University's Native American Student and Community Center. It was co-sponsored by KBOO, KPSU, and KPCN-LP.

== See also ==
- List of community radio stations in the United States
