= KMUN =

Public radio station in Astoria, Oregon

KMUN and KTCB
KMUN: Astoria, Oregon; KTCB: Tillamook, Oregon; United States
- Broadcast area: Northern Oregon Coast Range
- Frequencies: KMUN: 91.9 MHz; KTCB: 89.5 MHz
- Branding: Coast Community Radio

Programming
- Format: Public radio
- Affiliations: National Public Radio, Pacifica Radio Network

Ownership
- Owner: Tillicum Foundation
- Sister stations: KMUX-FM

History
- First air date: KMUN: April 17, 1983; KTCB: 2004
- Call sign meaning: KMUN: From "community"

Technical information
- Licensing authority: FCC
- Facility ID: KMUN: 67107; KTCB: 93286
- Class: KMUN: C2; KTCB: A
- ERP: KMUN: 7,200 watts; KTCB: 380 watts
- HAAT: KMUN: 332 meters (1,089 ft); KTCB: 351 meters (1,152 ft)
- Transmitter coordinates: KMUN: 46°15′45.3″N 123°53′13.5″W; KTCB: 45°27′58.4″N 123°55′15.5″W
- Translator(s): KMUN: 89.3 K207FG (Cannon Beach); KMUN: 91.3 K217FG (South Astoria); KTCB: 104.3 K282BV (Wheeler)

Links
- Public license information: KMUN: Public file; LMS; KTCB: Public file; LMS
- Webcast: Listen live
- Website: kmun.org

KMUX-FM
Currently broadcasting
- Warrenton, Oregon; United States
- Broadcast area: North Oregon Coast
- Frequency: 90.9 MHz
- Branding: The Lower Columbia's Source for Music Discovery

Programming
- Format: Adult Album Alternative

Ownership
- Owner: Tillicum Foundation
- Sister stations: KMUN

History
- First air date: April 17, 2006
- Former call signs: KCPB-FM (2006–2026)

Technical information
- Licensing authority: FCC
- Facility ID: 93685
- Class: A
- ERP: 240 watts
- HAAT: 341 meters (1,119 ft)
- Transmitter coordinates: 46°15′45.3″N 123°53′13.5″W

Links
- Public license information: Public file; LMS
- Webcast: Listen live
- Website: kmux.org

KMUN (91.9 MHz) is a community and public radio station in Astoria, Oregon, serving the Northern Oregon Coast Range. The station is owned by the Tillicum Foundation, alongside KMUX-FM 90.9, and maintains studios in Tillicum House on Exchange Street in Astoria. Three low-power translators and KTCB (89.5 FM) in Tillamook extend the signal south. KMUN features a block radio format with news, public affairs, and music programming.

== History ==
The Tillicum Foundation was incorporated in 1977 with the goal of bringing a local radio station to Astoria. In the early 1980s, a plan gestated to bring a community radio station to Astoria. On November 10, 1981, the station received its construction permit. Because Astoria was not in range of public radio at the time, the station was a high priority for grants from the National Telecommunications and Information Administration. After getting the permit, volunteers of the nascent KMUN reached out to Portland community radio station KBOO for assistance; at one point, it was thought that KMUN might rebroadcast part of KBOO's broadcast day because of a potential lack of local interest, but it was not feasible to relay KBOO's signal from Portland over remote terrain to Astoria.

KMUN began broadcasting on April 17, 1983. The original transmitter facility was on Megler Mountain, where KMUN erected a donated 60-foot (18 m) timber telephone pole. Originally reaching only the Astoria area, the station expanded down the Oregon Coast in 1986 with the addition of translators relaying its signal. KMUN's studios were originally in the Gunderson Building until a supporter bought a house on Exchange Street in 1987 and donated it to the Tillicum Foundation; the station needed to relocate so it could install a satellite dish to receive NPR programming. Its programming was nearly entirely volunteer-produced; there were 30 volunteers when the station launched, about 70 by 1988, and 250 in 2003. In 2003, the station launched a local news department, building a newsroom in place of a decaying porch at Tillicum House. The Tillamook translator was replaced in 2004 by the higher-power KTCB, in part to prevent the translator from being displaced by any future stations.

KCPB-FM began operating April 17, 2006, the 23rd anniversary of KMUN's sign-on. It featured a format of mostly national programming, primarily classical music, with music scheduled at times when KMUN had talk programming and vice versa. The creation of KCPB-FM resolved tensions among KMUN listeners over whether to air more national programming from NPR. It provided much of the service previously offered by a fringe signal from KPLU-FM in Tacoma, Washington, which was about to go away, and cable radio's offering of Oregon Public Broadcasting, which had recently been discontinued. Much of the equipment was previously used by KMUN prior to a technical upgrade.

KMUN stayed on the air during the Great Coastal Gale of 2007 despite having a large elm tree crash into the studio building.

On October 1, 2025, Tillicum suspended the operations of KCPB-FM, citing "ongoing funding challenges" (including the U.S. government pulling funding from public media), as well as a desire to "reset" the station and relaunch it at a later date with "alternate programming sources". The suspension is projected to last twelve months. Its call sign was changed to KMUX-FM on July 1, 2026. KMUX-FM went live as a music discovery station on October 1, 2026.

== See also ==
- List of community radio stations in the United States
