= WAZU =

- Peoria, Illinois; United States
- Frequency: 90.7 MHz
- Branding: Strictly Hip-Hop 90.7FM

Programming
- Format: Urban
- Affiliations: KZGM; Illinois Central College; Pacifica Radio

Ownership
- Owner: Sirius Syncope Inc.

History
- First air date: June 2010

Technical information
- Licensing authority: FCC
- Facility ID: 90309
- Class: A
- ERP: 500 watts
- HAAT: 81 meters (266 ft)
- Transmitter coordinates: 40°46′46.1″N 89°39′18.4″W (NAD83)

Links
- Public license information: Public file; LMS
- Website: wazufm.org

WAZU is a non-commercial educational (NCE) urban station on 90.7 MHz at Peoria, Illinois. It is owned by Sirius Syncope, a not-for-profit organization in West Peoria, Illinois.

Station manager Jeremy Styninger applied for a license in March 1998. The station received its construction permit on May 30, 2007. In a December 2009 Illinois Central College board meeting, the college president announced an ICC contract to establish the station, and a map showing coverage from Mendota to Mason City and from Bushnell to Streator.

The station was reported on the air with Pacifica Radio programming on or before June 18, 2010. The station received its license on June 23, 2010, and was being operated by Illinois Central College with 36 hours/week of syndicated talk programs by the beginning of July 2010. By the end of July the station was simulcasting 88.1 KZGM Cabool, Missouri, with KZGM providing both Missouri and Peoria weather forecast announcements, while preparing for full Illinois Central College use.

Illinois Central College provided studios and student workers and interns and had two WAZU studios, one each at North Campus and East Peoria. ICC ended its association and funding of the station in September 2015. In mid-November 2017, the station switched from its public radio format to an urban music format, playing a music of hip-hop and R&B.

== See also ==
- List of community radio stations in the United States
