= WNJR (FM) =

Noncommercial educational radio station

- Washington, Pennsylvania; United States
- Broadcast area: Greater Pittsburgh
- Frequency: 91.7 MHz

Programming
- Format: Freeform

Ownership
- Owner: Washington and Jefferson College

History
- First air date: 1961
- Former call signs: WAJC (1961–1971); WJCR (1971–1989); WXJX (1989–2002)
- Call sign meaning: Washington and Jefferson Radio

Technical information
- Licensing authority: FCC
- Facility ID: 70942
- Class: A
- ERP: 400 watts
- HAAT: 123 meters (404 ft)
- Transmitter coordinates: 40°10′13.00″N 80°14′43.00″W

Links
- Public license information: Public file; LMS
- Webcast: Listen live
- Website: www.wnjr.org

WNJR (91.7 MHz) is a non-commercial FM radio station broadcasting a freeform radio format. Licensed to Washington, Pennsylvania, it serves Greater Pittsburgh's Southwest suburbs. The station is owned by Washington & Jefferson College.

== Station history ==
Washington & Jefferson's first student radio station, WAJC-AM, began broadcasting on October 8, 1961, from the second floor of the music building. The next year, the station received $200 in funding from the Student Council and upgraded its transmitter, but the signal could only be heard in Hays Hall, Mellon Hall, Upperclassmen Dorm, and many fraternity houses. In 1971, the college secured a license to broadcast as WJCR at 88.3 FM, upgraded to a 10-watt transmitter, and moved to the Old Gym. By the mid-1980s, the station's operations had deteriorated to the point where it no longer produced a transmission. New Federal Communications Commission regulations forced the station to upgrade to a signal strength of at least 100 watts to keep a non-commercial license. Unable to convince the college administrators to upgrade the transmitter, in 1989, a newly refurbished WXJX station was broadcasting at 92.1 FM from a new on-air studio and production booth, using the same 10-watt transmitter which was substantially repaired. For the first time, the signal could be heard beyond the campus, reaching as far as the Franklin Mall and the Washington Mall.

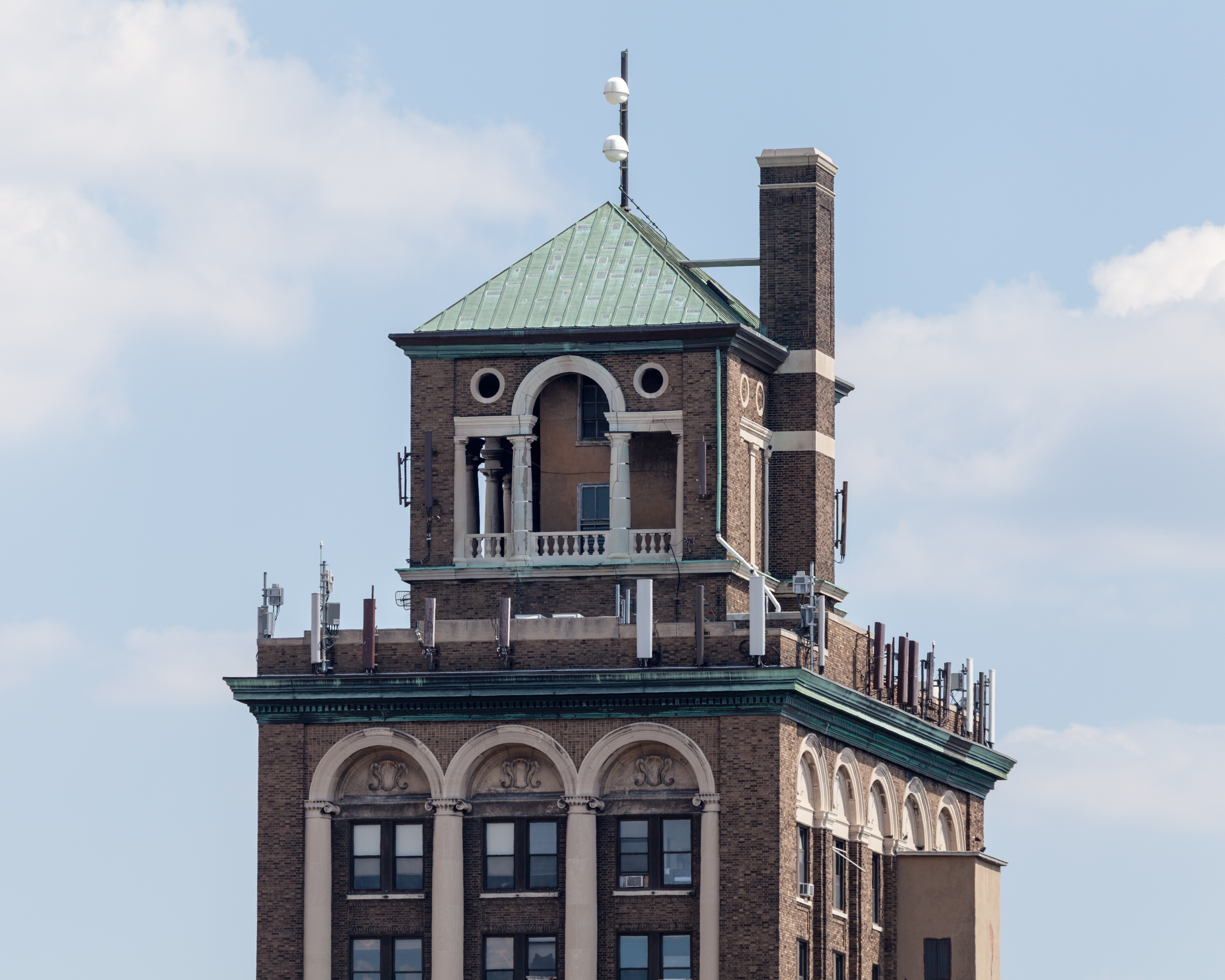
Broadcast antenna atop the Washington Trust Building

In early 2000, the current studio was installed in The Commons and in 2003 a 1500-watt transmitter was installed at the Washington Trust Building, reaching roughly 30 miles in all directions. A change to a new classic rock format and a Simian automated playout system enabled 24-hour broadcasting for the first time. At the same time, the station hired a full-time manager, changed its call sign to WNJR and the frequency to 91.7 MHz. Around 2007, ultimate control of the station was shifted to a member of the faculty, Anthony Fleury, and the role of station manager reverted to student control. In 2007, new MegaSeg automation software aided a format shift to freeform music and the station joined the Pacifica Radio Network.

WNJR has been listed as silent in the FCC database since October 30, 2018. It returned to the air on October 15, 2019.

== Format and programming ==
WNJR is licensed as a noncommercial educational station and operates as a co-curricular program of the W&J Department of Theatre and Communication. Assisted by a faculty advisor, the student-run studio broadcasts in a freeform format with several nationally syndicated programs, including Democracy Now!, Free Speech Radio News, and CounterSpin. The station also plays Pittsburgh-based independent programs including Rustbelt Radio and The Saturday Light Brigade. Student on-air personalities produce radio programs including music, news, talk, and sports.

The WNJR Sports Broadcasting Crew produces live broadcasts from the College's athletic teams. During the 2008 Democratic presidential primary elections, the sports crew produced live coverage for two political events on campus: a town hall meeting with Barack Obama and a rally for Hillary Clinton featuring former President Bill Clinton. In 2009, students in a theater workshop course performed a series of 1940s radio dramas, including the Lux Radio Theater version of The Bachelor and the Bobby-Soxer.

== Awards and recognition ==
At the 2008 Pittsburgh Achievement in Radio Awards, WNJR won four of six college radio awards, including the College Radio Sports Reporting or Play-by-Play Announcer or Host, College Radio On-Air Personality, College Radio Editorial and College Radio Station Website categories.

The WNJR radio program, "The American Justice System: A Day in the Life of..." won a 2009 Community and Educational Outreach Award from the National Association of Bar Executives. The interview-based program, a joint production with the Washington County Bar Association, is hosted by two local attorneys who conduct interviews with legal professionals to discuss the justice system.

In 2013, senior Erikka Loper was awarded the Excellence in Broadcasting Award by the Pennsylvania Association of Broadcasters for her weekly radio program Friend or Fraud. This was the college's first nominated program.
