= Anahola, Hawaii =

Anahola
- Census-designated place
- Location in Kauaʻi County and the state of Hawaii
- Coordinates: 22°8′42″N 159°18′47″W
- Country: United States
- State: Hawaii
- County: Kauaʻi

Area
  - Total: 4.07 sq mi (10.54 km^{2})
  - Land: 3.68 sq mi (9.54 km^{2})
  - Water: 0.39 sq mi (1.00 km^{2})
- Elevation: 30 ft (9 m)

Population (2020)
  - Total: 2,243
  - Density: 608.8/sq mi (235.04/km^{2})
- Time zone: UTC-10 (Hawaii-Aleutian)
- ZIP code: 96703
- Area code: 808
- FIPS code: 15-02200
- GNIS feature ID: 0358587

Anahola (literally "deadly winds" in Hawaiian) is a census-designated place (CDP) in Kauaʻi County, Hawaiʻi, United States. The population was 2,311 at the 2020 census, up from 1,932 at the 2000 census.

== History ==
During the reign of King Kamehameha I, the island of Kauaʻi was the last of the Hawaiian islands to join Kamehameha's Kingdom of Hawaiʻi. The ruler, Kaumualiʻi, resisted Kamehameha for years, surviving two attempts to invade Kauaʻi.

Anahola is the site of an ancient surfing area, Ka-nahā-wale, which literally translates to "easily broken".

== Geography ==
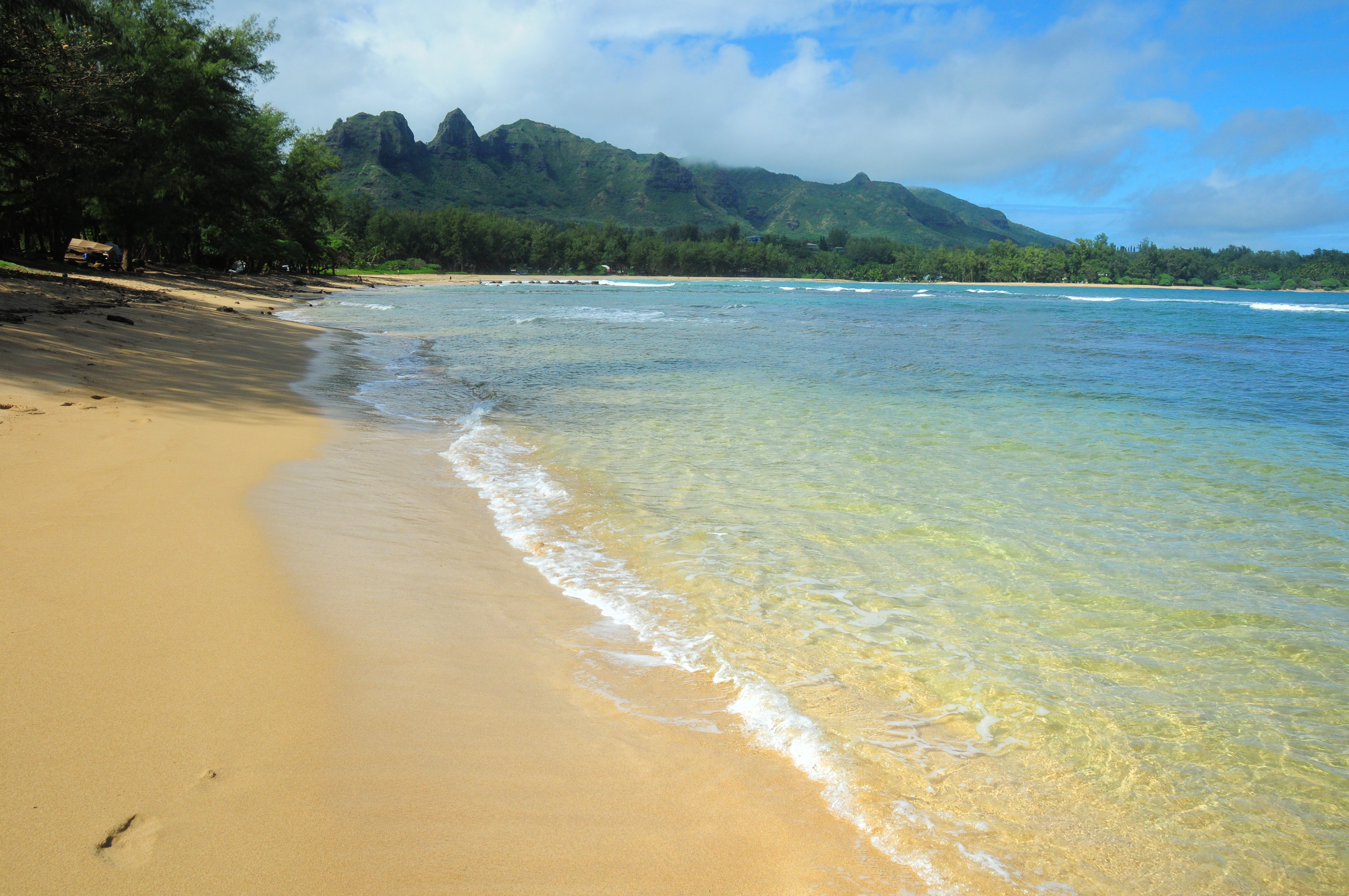
Anahola Bay is a snorkeling and swimming beach with clear pools and a long coral reef. Driving directions in the Kauai Trailblazer guide.

Anahola is located at 22°8′42″N 159°18′47″W (22.145049, -159.312969). According to the United States Census Bureau, the CDP has a total area of 4.0 square miles (10.4 km^{2}), of which 3.6 square miles (9.4 km^{2}) are land and 0.4 square miles (1.0 km^{2}), or 9.63%, is water.

The community is located on Hawaii Route 56 on the northeast coast of the island of Kauaʻi. It is 13 miles (21 km) north of Lihue and 10 miles (16 km) southeast of Kilauea. Anahola is adjacent to Anahola Bay, a bay of the Pacific Ocean.

== Demographics ==
Historical population
Census	Pop.	Note	%±
2020	2,243		—
U.S. Decennial Census

=== 2020 census ===
As of the 2020 census, Anahola had a population of 2,243. The median age was 38.6 years. 25.0% of residents were under the age of 18 and 17.1% of residents were 65 years of age or older. For every 100 females there were 89.4 males, and for every 100 females age 18 and over there were 89.1 males age 18 and over.

0.0% of residents lived in urban areas, while 100.0% lived in rural areas.

There were 646 households in Anahola, of which 42.6% had children under the age of 18 living in them. Of all households, 47.5% were married-couple households, 13.5% were households with a male householder and no spouse or partner present, and 27.2% were households with a female householder and no spouse or partner present. About 15.6% of all households were made up of individuals and 7.4% had someone living alone who was 65 years of age or older.

There were 716 housing units, of which 9.8% were vacant. The homeowner vacancy rate was 0.6% and the rental vacancy rate was 5.6%.

Racial composition as of the 2020 census
Race	Number	Percent
White	323	14.4%
Black or African American	1	0.0%
American Indian and Alaska Native	2	0.1%
Asian	101	4.5%
Native Hawaiian and Other Pacific Islander	883	39.4%
Some other race	17	0.8%
Two or more races	916	40.8%
Hispanic or Latino (of any race)	186	8.3%

=== 2000 census ===
As of the census of 2000, there were 1,932 people, 549 households, and 422 families residing in the CDP. The population density was 514.8 inhabitants per square mile (198.8/km^{2}). There were 606 housing units at an average density of 161.5 units per square mile (62.4 units/km^{2}). The racial makeup of the CDP was 13.7% White, 0.4% African American, 0.5% Native American, 7.1% Asian, 47.7% Pacific Islander, 1.4% from other races, and 29.2% from two or more races. Hispanic or Latino of any race were 8.1% of the population.

There were 549 households, out of which 36.4% had children under the age of 18 living with them, 53.2% were married couples living together, 17.5% had a female householder with no husband present, and 23.0% were non-families. 14.6% of all households were made up of individuals, and 3.5% had someone living alone who was 65 years of age or older. The average household size was 3.52 and the average family size was 3.98.

In the CDP the population was spread out, with 31.7% under the age of 18, 9.5% from 18 to 24, 27.8% from 25 to 44, 22.8% from 45 to 64, and 8.2% who were 65 years of age or older. The median age was 32 years. For every 100 females, there were 101.0 males. For every 100 females age 18 and over, there were 95.6 males.

The median income for a household in the CDP was $41,771, and the median income for a family was $41,302. Males had a median income of $25,875 versus $27,000 for females. The per capita income for the CDP was $13,829. About 12.4% of families and 14.2% of the population were below the poverty line, including 21.5% of those under age 18 and 4.9% of those age 65 or over.

== In popular culture ==
Kalalea Mountain overlooking Anahola is featured in the first shot of the 1981 feature film Raiders of the Lost Ark. The opening scene of this first installment in the Indiana Jones film franchise is supposed to take place in the Peruvian jungle where the main character, Indiana Jones, discovers an ancient booby-trapped temple.

Kalalea and the Anahola mountains also serve as a backdrop for a Polynesian resort - supposedly located on Makatea island - in the 1998 feature film Six Days, Seven Nights. Coincidently, this movie also stars Harrison Ford.
