= WGDR =

- Plainfield, Vermont; United States
- Broadcast area: Central Vermont
- Frequency: 91.1 MHz

Programming
- Format: Freeform
- Affiliations: National Federation of Community Broadcasters; Vermont Access Network; Vermont Broadcasters Association; Pacifica Radio Network

Ownership
- Owner: Central Vermont Community Radio Corporation
- Sister stations: WGDH

History
- First air date: 1973
- Former call signs: WGOD

Technical information
- Licensing authority: FCC
- Facility ID: 24438
- Class: A
- ERP: 60 watts (legal); 60 watts (actual)
- HAAT: −106.0 meters (−347.8 ft)
- Transmitter coordinates: 44°17′4.00″N 72°26′28.00″W

Links
- Public license information: Public file; LMS
- Webcast: Official website
- Website: http://www.wgdr.org

WGDR (91.1 FM) is a noncommercial American radio station licensed to Plainfield, Vermont, serving central Vermont. WGDR, owned by Central Vermont Community Radio Corporation, is a hybrid community/public radio station, broadcasting a freeform format.

== History ==
Founded in 1973, it is the oldest and biggest non-commercial community radio station in Vermont.

In 2009, the station was granted a construction permit by the Federal Communications Commission to build a second transmission tower near Hardwick, Vermont and operate on a second frequency to reach a much wider area of northern Vermont.

On March 1, 2011, the FCC granted an operating license to the new station, which began full-power regular broadcasting on March 7, 2011. The new station, assigned the call letters WGDH, broadcasts at 91.7 FM, simulcasting with WGDR.

Effective May 10, 2021, Goddard College Corporation donated the licenses for WGDR and sister station WGDH to Central Vermont Community Radio Corporation.

== Description ==
Reaching over 45,000 listeners by broadcast and online, the station has more than 60 local programmers, with the majority of that programming done live daily. The station is one of 6 community radio stations in Vermont.

The station broadcasts a mix of music and public affairs programming produced by local volunteers from northern and central Vermont, plus Pacifica Radio programming. WGDR's antenna moved in June 2026, maintaining most of the orginial broadcast map for a radius of 20 to 25 miles (32 to 40 km).

== See also ==
- List of community radio stations in the United States
