= KDUR =

- Durango, Colorado; United States
- Broadcast area: Four Corners
- Frequency: 91.9 MHz
- Branding: Fort Lewis College Community Radio

Programming
- Format: Variety
- Affiliations: Pacifica Radio Network

Ownership
- Owner: Fort Lewis College; (Board of Trustees)

History
- First air date: 1975
- Call sign meaning: "Durango"

Technical information
- Licensing authority: FCC
- Facility ID: 22087
- Class: A
- ERP: 6,000 watts
- HAAT: -156 meters
- Transmitter coordinates: 37°16′41″N 107°52′21″W
- Translator: (93.9 MHz) K230AC (La Plata County)

Links
- Public license information: Public file; LMS
- Webcast: Listen live
- Website: www.kdur.org

KDUR 91.9 MHz is a college and community radio station owned by Fort Lewis College in Durango, Colorado. The station, which serves the Four Corners region of southwest Colorado, operated as a 205-watt facility since going on the air in 1975. On May 11, 2010, KDUR received its license from the Federal Communications Commission (FCC) to increase its power to 6,000 watts. In addition to broadcasting diverse music, local public affairs, and alternative news, the station provides educational and training opportunities to college students and community members.

== Translator ==
Call sign	Frequency	City of license	FID	ERP (W)	Class	FCC info
K230AC	93.9 FM	La Plata County, Colorado	12368	51	D	LMS

== See also ==
- Campus radio
- List of college radio stations in the United States
- List of community radio stations in the United States
