= Kalihi Wai, Hawaii =

- Census-designated place
- Location in Kauaʻi County and the state of Hawaii
- Coordinates: 22°12′59″N 159°25′7″W
- Country: United States
- State: Hawaii
- County: Kauaʻi

Area
  - Total: 2.76 sq mi (7.16 km^{2})
  - Land: 2.64 sq mi (6.84 km^{2})
  - Water: 0.12 sq mi (0.32 km^{2})
- Elevation: 33 ft (10 m)

Population (2020)
  - Total: 361
  - Density: 136.6/sq mi (52.76/km^{2})
- Time zone: UTC-10 (Hawaii-Aleutian)
- Area code: 808
- FIPS code: 15-26750
- GNIS feature ID: 0360149

Kalihi Wai or Kalihiwai (literally, "Kalihi with a stream" in Hawaiian where "kalihi" means "the edge") is a census-designated place (CDP) in Kauaʻi County, Hawaiʻi, United States. The population was 361 at the 2020 census.

== Geography ==
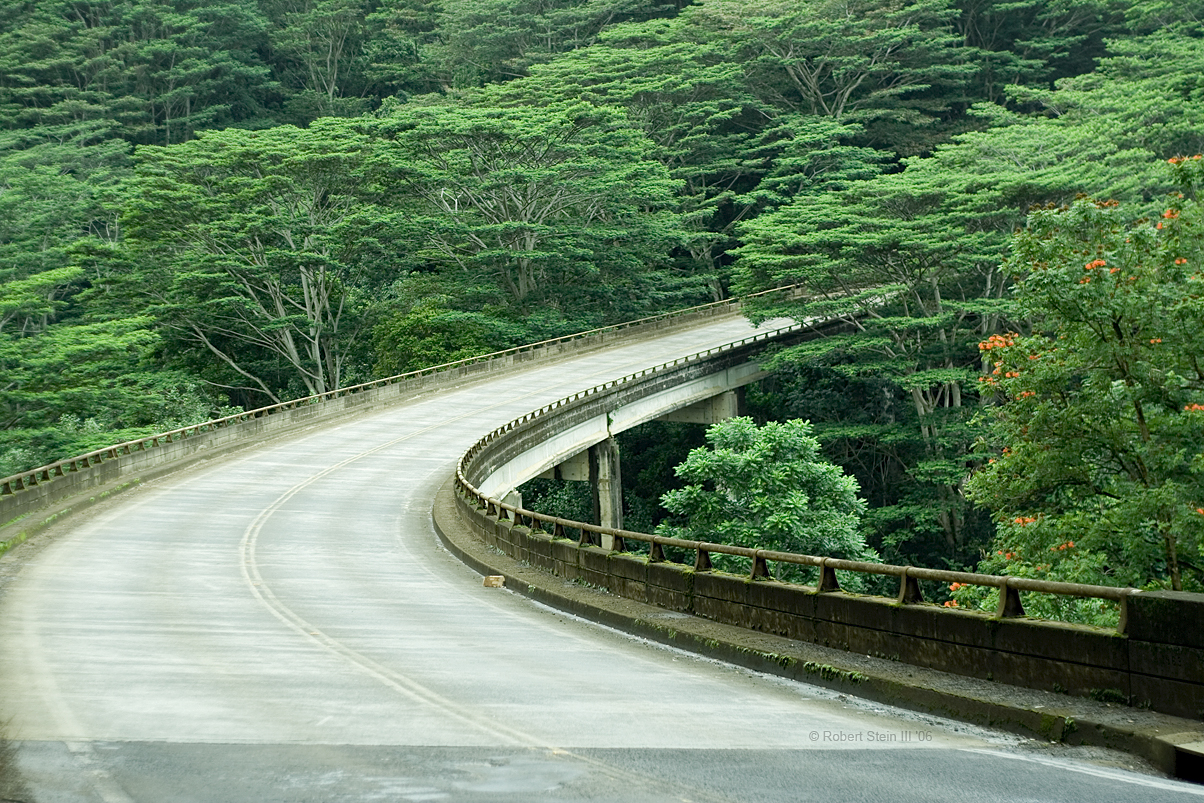
Kalihi Wai Bridge, Kuhio Highway 56, Kauai, Hawaii

Kalihi Wai is located on the north shore of the island of Kauaʻi at 22°12′59″N 159°25′7″W (22.216269, -159.418705). It is bordered to the east by Kilauea and to the west by Princeville. Hawaii Route 56 forms the southern edge of the community and leads southeast 17 miles (27 km) to Kapaa and west 5 miles (8 km) to Hanalei.

According to the United States Census Bureau, the Kalihi Wai CDP has a total area of 2.8 square miles (7.2 km^{2}), of which 2.7 square miles (6.9 km^{2}) are land and 0.1 square miles (0.3 km^{2}), or 4.46%, are water.

== Demographics ==
Historical population
Census	Pop.	Note	%±
2020	361		—
U.S. Decennial Census

As of the census of 2000, there were 717 people, 280 households, and 182 families residing in the CDP. The population density was 113.7 inhabitants per square mile (43.9/km^{2}). There were 394 housing units at an average density of 62.5 per square mile (24.1/km^{2}). The racial makeup of the CDP was 72% White, <1% African American, 10% Asian, 4% Pacific Islander, 1% from other races, and 13% from two or more races. Hispanic or Latino of any race were 3% of the population.

There were 280 households, out of which 36% had children under the age of 18 living with them, 50% were married couples living together, 10% had a female householder with no husband present, and 35% were non-families. 25% of all households were made up of individuals, and 4% had someone living alone who was 65 years of age or older. The average household size was 2.56 and the average family size was 3.04.

In the CDP the population was spread out, with 26% under the age of 18, 6% from 18 to 24, 28% from 25 to 44, 34% from 45 to 64, and 6% who were 65 years of age or older. The median age was 40 years. For every 100 females, there were 106.6 males. For every 100 females age 18 and over, there were 97.0 males.

The median income for a household in the CDP was $42,083, and the median income for a family was $50,536. Males had a median income of $37,143 versus $30,125 for females. The per capita income for the CDP was $37,062. About 14% of families and 14% of the population were below the poverty line, including 12% of those under age 18 and 25% of those age 65 or over.
