= KZGM =

- Cabool, Missouri; United States
- Frequency: 88.1 MHz
- Branding: KZ88

Programming
- Format: Community radio
- Affiliations: Pacifica Radio; WAZU

Ownership
- Owner: Real Community Radio Network, Inc.

History
- First air date: April 6, 2009

Technical information
- Licensing authority: FCC
- Facility ID: 172919
- Class: C3
- ERP: 12,500 watts
- HAAT: 135 meters (443 ft)
- Transmitter coordinates: 37°7′15.2″N 92°0′9.6″W

Links
- Public license information: Public file; LMS

KZGM is a non-commercial educational FM broadcast station on 88.1 MHz at Cabool, Missouri. The station produces over 50% of its programming locally featuring local and independent artists as well as coverage of area events and issues. The station is listener supported. It is locally owned an operated. It is owned by Real Community Radio Network at the same location as the studio. It runs a community radio format and describes itself as providing the first public radio service to over 25,000 people.

As of the end of July 2010, KZGM is being fed to 90.7 WAZU Peoria, Illinois as well, while WAZU establishes its permanent operations.

== See also ==
- List of community radio stations in the United States
