= WJVS =

Radio station in Cincinnati, Ohio (1976–2012)

Cincinnati, Ohio; United States
- Frequency: 88.3 MHz

Programming
- Format: High school radio

Ownership
- Owner: Great Oaks Joint Voc. Sch. Dist.

History
- First air date: 1976
- Last air date: May 10, 2012
- Call sign meaning: Great Oaks Joint Vocational School

Technical information
- Facility ID: 24983
- Class: A
- ERP: 175 watts
- HAAT: 30 meters (98 ft)
- Transmitter coordinates: 39°17′21.00″N 84°24′52.00″W

WJVS (88.3 FM) was a student-run radio station in Cincinnati, Ohio, and operated by the Great Oaks Institute of Technology and Career Development, and based at the Sharonville, Ohio, school. On May 10, 2012, the station's transmitter failed, and the station, which had been scheduled to permanently shut down May 18, decided to end broadcasting at that time.

WJVS shared its frequency with WAIF, also located in Cincinnati. WJVS operated during the normal school year, Monday through Friday, from 8:00 a.m. to 2:20 P.M.
