= KMUD =

- Garberville, California; United States
- Broadcast area: Northwestern California
- Frequency: 91.1 MHz (HD Radio)

Programming
- Format: Variety
- Affiliations: Pacifica Radio

Ownership
- Owner: Redwood Community Radio

History
- First air date: 1987

Technical information
- Licensing authority: FCC
- Facility ID: 55426
- Class: C0
- ERP: 9,000 watts
- HAAT: 784 meters
- Transmitter coordinates: 40°7′12.5″N 123°41′35.1″W

Links
- Public license information: Public file; LMS
- Website: kmud.org

KMUD (91.1 FM) is a community radio station broadcasting a variety format, licensed to Garberville, California. The station serves Humboldt county in the North Coast region. KMUD is owned by Redwood Community Radio and its studios are located in Redway, California.

KMUD simulcasts its programming on two full power FM stations: KMUE 88.1 in Eureka and KLAI 90.3 in Laytonville. It also maintains a translator at 99.5 FM in Shelter Cove, California.

== History ==
KMUD went on the air on May 28, 1987. For decades the station has issued warnings and alerts to the region on the whereabouts of law enforcement on their way to raid marijuana gardens.

== See also ==
- Community radio
- Pacifica Radio
- List of community radio stations in the United States
