= WRCT =

American radio station

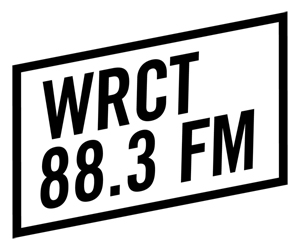
- Pittsburgh, Pennsylvania; United States
- Broadcast area: Pittsburgh metropolitan area
- Frequency: 88.3 MHz

Programming
- Format: Free-form radio
- Affiliations: Pacifica Radio

Ownership
- Owner: WRCT Radio, Inc.

History
- First air date: March 1, 1974
- Call sign meaning: "Radio Carnegie Tech"

Technical information
- Licensing authority: FCC
- Facility ID: 1
- Class: A
- ERP: 1,750 watts (directional)
- HAAT: 22 meters (72 ft)
- Transmitter coordinates: 40°26′39″N 79°56′37″W

Links
- Public license information: Public file; LMS
- Website: www.wrct.org

WRCT (88.3 FM) is a non-commercial free-form radio station based in Pittsburgh, Pennsylvania. The volunteer-run station has a studio in the basement of Carnegie Mellon's University Center. It broadcasts throughout the city with an ERP of 1.75 kW, from atop Warner Hall. WRCT Radio, Inc. holds the station's license.

== History ==
WRCT or Radio Carnegie Tech began as a carrier current AM radio station on 900 kHz, at Carnegie Institute of Technology (now Carnegie Mellon University) in 1949 by engineering students. The students used electrical wiring to broadcast a weak AM signal to a few academic buildings for several hours each day. In 1950, WRCT became an official student organization and covered half the buildings on campus.

WRCT began broadcasting at 88.3 FM on March 1, 1974, with a power of 10 watts. This extended its signal across campus and to nearby areas. In the late 1980s, the power increased to 100 watts.

In 1994, WRCT received permission to increase power to 1,750 watts in the north, south, and west and 680 watts in the east, allowing it to be heard up to fifteen miles away. The station also streams audio on the Internet through the station's website.

Volunteers from the Carnegie Mellon campus and the community run the station, serving as disc jockeys, producers, engineers, and support staff.

== Programming ==
WRCT's mission is to present its listening audience with free-form, original programming not found on the other radio stations in Pittsburgh.

=== Music ===
The on-air DJs select the station's varied musical programming. WRCT's record library includes almost 70,000 records and CDs. Musical genres commonly in rotation include alternative country, blues, electronic, experimental, hip hop, heavy metal, indie rock, jazz, musical theater, and world music. Programmers also play locally produced music, including creative beats, conscious lyrics, and new artists.

=== Public affairs ===
WRCT's public affairs programming emphasizes news and issues from the Pittsburgh community. The station's original programming includes:

- Barrio Latino: The Latin American Radio Hour – the latest news from Latin America and the Pittsburgh Hispanic community
- Brazilian Radio Hour or Cantinho Brasileiro no Radio – Brazilian music and news broadcast in English and Portuguese
- History for the Future – interviews with academics and journalists to explore the history behind contemporary social issues
- Rustbelt Radio – the Pittsburgh Independent Media Center's weekly round-up of grassroots news
- The Saturday Light Brigade – one of the longest-running public radio shows in the country

=== Pacifica radio ===
WRCT is Pittsburgh's Pacifica Radio Network affiliate station, airing the following public affairs programs:

- Democracy Now!
- Feature Story News
- Law and Disorder

== Awards ==
Brazilian Radio Hour won the 2013 Brazilian International Press Award.

In 2023, WRCT was recognized in the Greater Pittsburgh Community Media Awards for Community Radio.

== Notable people ==
Electronic music artist, DJ, and record producer Yaeji was a member of WRCT and debuted some of her first sets on the station while studying at Carnegie Mellon.

== See also ==
- List of community radio stations in the United States
