= KBUT =

- Crested Butte, Colorado; United States
- Frequency: 90.3 MHz

Programming
- Format: Public radio
- Affiliations: NPR; Pacifica Radio

History
- First air date: December 20, 1986
- Call sign meaning: "Crested Butte"

Technical information
- Licensing authority: FCC
- Facility ID: 14492
- Class: A
- ERP: 1,000 watts
- HAAT: −208.0 meters (−682.4 ft)
- Transmitter coordinates: 38°54′7″N 106°58′21″W

Links
- Public license information: Public file; LMS
- Website: kbut.org

KBUT (90.3 FM), is a National Public Radio-member station in Crested Butte, Colorado. It features an eclectic mix of locally produced music shows (46 each week). The shows range from classical to jazz to rock to hip-hop. KBUT has been on air since December 1986 and has its studio in Crested Butte, with its main transmitter on Sunlight Ridge in Mt. Crested Butte and translators in Almont and Gunnison. It also streams its signal online and is available at www.kbut.org. In June 2010, the Sunlight Ridge transmitter began broadcasting in HD as well as analog. On April 15, 2012, KBUT-FM's parent, Crested Butte Mountain Educational Radio, Inc. was granted a U.S. Federal Communications Commission construction permit to increase ERP to 1,000 watts and decrease HAAT to -208 meters.

== See also ==
- List of community radio stations in the United States
