= KVMR =

Radio station in Nevada City, California

- Nevada City, California; United States
- Frequency: 89.5 MHz

Programming
- Format: Community radio
- Affiliations: Pacifica Radio Network

Ownership
- Owner: Nevada City Community Broadcast Group

History
- Call sign meaning: Victorian Museum Radio

Technical information
- Licensing authority: FCC
- Facility ID: 48338
- Class: B1
- ERP: 1,750 watts
- HAAT: 345 meters (1,132 ft)
- Transmitter coordinates: 39°14′47″N 120°57′48″W
- Translator: See § Translators
- Repeater: 88.3 KCPC (Camino)

Links
- Public license information: Public file; LMS
- Webcast: Listen live
- Website: www.kvmr.org

KVMR (89.5 FM) is a community radio station founded in 1978 in Nevada City, California, United States.

== History ==
After two years of planning, KVMR signed on the air on July 14, 1978. KVMR first operated under the umbrella of the Nevada City-based non-profit, The American Victorian Museum (AVM). Deriving its name from Victorian Museum Radio, KVMR first broadcast from a small shack on nearby Banner Mountain, at just 20 watts, four hours a day.

In 1981, with the help of AVM directors, KVMR found a home at the Museum, upgraded its power and began broadcasting 24 hours a day.

By the mid- to late 1980s, KVMR's nominal board formed an independent non-profit organization and purchased the station from the failing AVM. In 1989, ownership of the station was transferred to the Nevada City Community Broadcast Group (NCCBG), KVMR's first board of directors.

=== Upgrades and changes ===
An upgrade of the station's broadcast facility in 1999 improved KVMR's regional signal quality. Its studios and offices are located in Nevada City, and its transmitter is located atop Banner Mountain. KVMR serves listeners throughout the Northern California Sierra foothills and the greater Sacramento Valley on 89.5 FM, Woodland at 93.9 FM, the Truckee–Tahoe region on 105.1 FM, Camino/Placerville at 88.3 FM and Angels Camp on 99.5 FM

== Funding changes ==
The Corporation for Public Broadcasting announced in August 2025 that it would cease operations. KVMR being one of 1500 community radio stations affected by these cuts. As a result of these cuts KVMR In addition to direct cuts, CPB was also responsible for negotiating music licensing agreements which allowed public radio stations to play music from copyrighted musicians over the air and via a live music stream. As of October 1, 2025, this function has been transferred to National Public Radio.

The Corporation for Public Broadcasting (CPB) began winding down operations after its federal funding was rescinded by Congress in July 2025. CPB President and CEO Patricia Harrison confirmed the closure in August 2025, stating the organization would retain a small team to resolve financial obligations and ensure continuity for music rights and royalties. Congress passed a measure eliminating $1.1 billion in public broadcasting funding in mid-July 2025

— Corporation for Public Broadcasting

== Translators ==
In addition to simulcasting on KCPC (88.3 FM, Camino), KVMR is rebroadcast by several broadcast relay stations (translators):

Broadcast translator for KVMR
Call sign	Frequency	City of license	FID	ERP (W)	HAAT	Class	FCC info
K230CA	93.9 FM	Woodland, California	83228	10	657 m (2,156 ft)	D	LMS
K258DG	99.5 FM	Angels Camp, California	156154	10	485 m (1,591 ft)	D	LMS
K286AN	105.1 FM	Truckee, California	156135	10	592 m (1,942 ft)	D	LMS
K289BM	105.7 FM	Grass Valley, California	147454	250	329 m (1,079 ft)	D	LMS

== See also ==
- List of community radio stations in the United States
