= KEOS =

Radio station in College Station, Texas

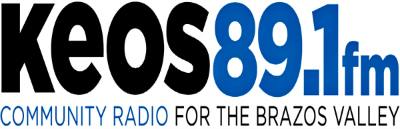
- College Station, Texas; United States
- Broadcast area: Brazos Valley
- Frequency: 89.1 MHz

Programming
- Format: Public radio
- Affiliations: NPR; Pacifica Radio

Ownership
- Owner: Brazos Educational Radio

History
- First air date: March 25, 1995

Technical information
- Licensing authority: FCC
- Facility ID: 6670
- Class: A
- ERP: 1000 watts
- HAAT: 77 m (253 ft)
- Transmitter coordinates: 30°38′54″N 96°23′23″W

Links
- Public license information: Public file; LMS
- Webcast: Listen live
- Website: www.keos.org

KEOS (89.1 MHz) is a listener-sponsored, non-commercial educational radio station licensed to College Station, Texas, and serving the Brazos Valley. Its owner, "Brazos Educational Radio", is a non-profit educational and cultural organization with 501(c)(3) tax-exempt status from the Internal Revenue Service. The station, which has an all-volunteer staff, is affiliated with NPR and Pacifica Radio. KEOS is completely locally supported by listeners with pledges, donations, underwriting, and volunteering, as well as support from "The Arts Council of Brazos Valley".

== History ==
KEOS began broadcasting from 508A East 32nd Street in the former "Tio Gordo Tortilla" production plant on March 25, 1995. It was appropriately nicknamed the "Tio Gordo Studios" in homage to the building's former occupant.

In 2002, KEOS began broadcasting from 207 East Carson Street in a building formerly occupied by "The Early Bird Shop." It was called "The Early Bird Studios."

On December 16, 2006, KEOS began broadcasting from its new home at 202 East Carson Street, formerly the home of KAGC "Christian Family Radio." After selling KAGC, Bob & Judy Bell sold the building with its studios to KEOS, which continues to broadcast from the eponymous "Bob & Judy Bell Studios".

== Programming ==
KEOS is a Pacifica radio affiliate, providing programming such as World Cafe and Pacifica Network News, in addition to local programming. KEOS offers musical, cultural, and informational programming. It provides a forum for alternative points of view on local, national, and international issues, with particular awareness to women, students, labor, minorities, and other public interest constituencies.

KEOS features music from folk to rock, from bluegrass to celtic, American Indian (Native American/First Peoples) to music from India and the subcontinent, Cajun to Texas roots, blues to Tejano, trip hop to synth-pop, EDM to EBM, to house music.

== See also ==
- List of radio stations in Texas
- List of community radio stations in the United States
