= KBGA =

College radio station on the campus of the University of Montana in Missoula, Montana

Missoula, Montana; United States
- Frequency: 89.9 MHz
- Branding: KBGA College Radio

Programming
- Format: Freeform/Student

Ownership
- Owner: University of Montana

History
- First air date: 1996

Technical information
- Licensing authority: FCC
- Class: A
- ERP: 1,000 watts
- HAAT: -80 m

Links
- Public license information: Public file; LMS
- Webcast: Listen Live
- Website: www.kbga.org

KBGA (89.9 FM), licensed to Missoula, Montana, is a college radio station on the campus of the University of Montana. It was formerly known as Revolution Radio. Josh Moyar is the current general manager of the station.

KBGA was established by an organization of students headed by Craig J. Altmaier and has been on the air, serving its community since August 23, 1996. KBGA was consulted by and briefly collaborated with Sirius Satellite Radio in 2000. In the same year, the station was introduced to the rest of the world in the print medium as it graced the pages of the June 8 issue of Rolling Stone magazine in an article covering webcasting.

== Founding ==
KBGA was founded in 1996 by Rob Bourriague, Todd Graetz, and Craig Altmaier, whose surname initials are represented by the station's call letters. The station, originally known as Revolution Radio, started as a student-run radio station at the University of Montana, securing funding through the Associated Students of the University of Montana via student fees. The fees were designed to reduce over a period of years as the station supplemented the fee income with listener contributions and other fund drives.

== See also ==
- Campus radio
- List of college radio stations in the United States
