= Kīlauea, Hawaii =

Kīlauea
- Census-designated place
- Location in Kauaʻi County and the state of Hawaii
- Coordinates: 22.21°N 159.41°W
- Country: United States
- State: Hawaii
- County: Kauaʻi

Area
  - Total: 5.27 sq mi (13.65 km^{2})
  - Land: 4.97 sq mi (12.87 km^{2})
  - Water: 0.30 sq mi (0.78 km^{2})
- Elevation: 292 ft (89 m)

Population (2020)
  - Total: 3,014
  - Density: 606.5/sq mi (234.17/km^{2})
- Time zone: UTC-10 (Hawaii-Aleutian)
- ZIP codes: 96722, 96754
- Area code: 808
- FIPS code: 15-36650
- GNIS feature ID: 0361214

Kīlauea is an unincorporated community and census-designated place (CDP) in Kauaʻi County, Hawaii, United States. As of the 2020 census it had a population of 3,014.

Kīlauea shares the name of the active volcano Kīlauea on the island of Hawaii. The name translates to "spewing" or "much spreading" in the Hawaiian language.

== Geography ==
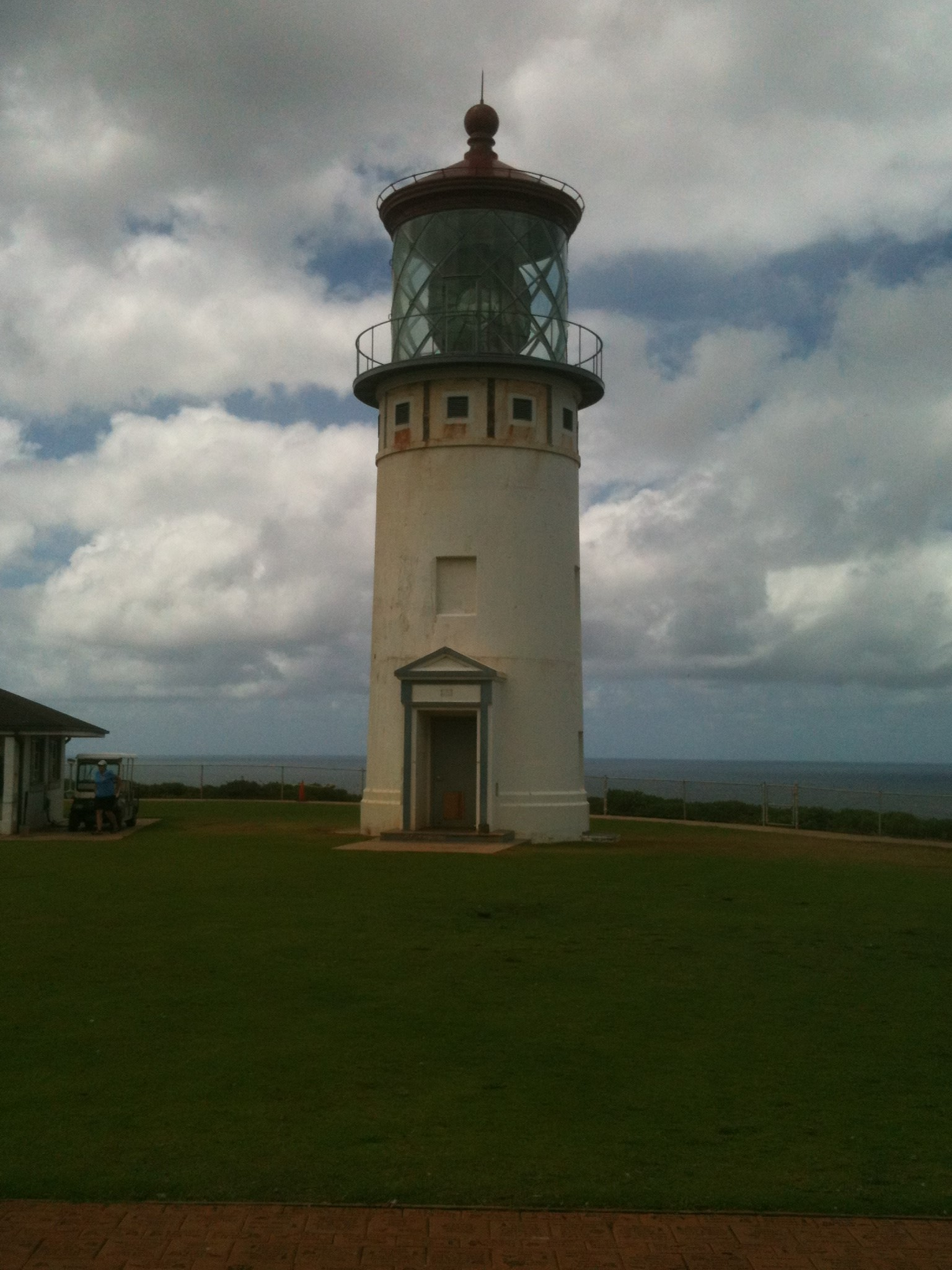
Historic Kīlauea Point Lighthouse built in 1913 on the island of Kauai in Hawaii.

Kīlauea is on Kauaʻi's northeastern shore and is bordered to the west by Kalihiwai and to the north by the Pacific Ocean. Hawaii Route 56 passes through the south side of the community, leading west 7 miles (11 km) to Hanalei and east 6 miles (10 km) to the Moloaa area, which includes Moloaa Forest Reserve and overlooks Moloaa Bay.

According to the U.S. Census Bureau, the Kilauea CDP has an area of 5.3 square miles (13.6 km^{2}), of which 4.9 square miles (12.8 km^{2}) are land and 0.3 square miles (0.8 km^{2}), or 5.71%, are water.

== Demographics ==
As of the 2020 census, there were 3,014 people, 1,093 housing units, and 934 families in the CDP. There were 1,544 White people, 9 African Americans, 16 Native Americans, 622 Asians, 138 Pacific Islanders, 72 people from some other race, and 613 people from two or more races. 286 people had Hispanic or Latino origin.

The ancestry was 16.6% German, 13.1% Irish, 7.6% Italian, 6.2% English, 4.3% French, 3.6% Norwegian, 2.1% Portuguese, and 1.4% Greek.

The median age was 40.3 years old. 18.4% of the population were 65 or older, with 14.5% between the ages of 65 and 74, 3.7% between the ages of 75 and 84, and 0.2% were 85 or older.

The median income was $86,765, with families having $92,986, married couples having $126,250, and non-families $59,097. 15.5% of the population were in poverty.

Historical population
Census	Pop.	Note	%±
2020	3,014		—
U.S. Decennial Census
