= Media cross-ownership in the United States =

Media cross-ownership is the common ownership of multiple media sources by a single person or corporate entity. Media sources include radio, broadcast television, specialty and pay television, cable, satellite, Internet Protocol television (IPTV), newspapers, magazines and periodicals, music, film, book publishing, video games, search engines, social media, internet service providers, and wired and wireless telecommunications.

Much of the debate over concentration of media ownership in the United States has for many years focused specifically on the ownership of broadcast stations, cable stations, newspapers, and websites. Some have pointed to an increase in media merging and concentration of ownership which may correlate to decreased trust in 'mass' media.

== Ownership of American media ==
Over time, both the number of media outlets and concentration of ownership have increased, translating to fewer companies owning more media outlets.

=== Technology ===
Apple
Produces iPhone, iPad, Mac, Apple Watch and Apple TV products, the iOS, iPadOS, macOS, watchOS, and tvOS operating systems, music streaming service Apple Music, video streaming service Apple TV, film/TV studio Apple Studios, news aggregator Apple News, and gaming platform Apple Arcade.
Alphabet
Owns search engine Google, video sharing site YouTube, proprietary rights to the open-source Android operating system, blog hosting site Blogger, Gmail e-mail service, and numerous other online media and software outlets.
Amazon
Owns the Amazon.com e-commerce marketplace, cloud computing platform AWS, video streaming service Amazon Prime Video, film/TV studio Amazon MGM Studios, music streaming service Amazon Music, and video live streaming service Twitch.
Meta
Owns Facebook, Instagram, Threads, Messenger, WhatsApp, and Reality Labs. Founder Mark Zuckerberg is the plurality shareholder of Meta.
Microsoft
Owns business-oriented social network LinkedIn, web portal MSN, search engine Bing, cloud computing platform Microsoft Azure, Office productivity suite, Outlook.com email service, and Windows operating system. Microsoft Gaming is the second-largest video game company in the United States. It produces Xbox video game consoles and services, and it is the largest video game publisher in the United States. Its five development and publishing labels consist of Xbox Game Studios, Bethesda Softworks, Activision, Blizzard Entertainment, and King.

=== Video ===
The Walt Disney Company
Owns Disney+, Hulu, Walt Disney Pictures, Walt Disney Animation Studios, Pixar Animation Studios, Lucasfilm, Marvel Studios, Searchlight Pictures, 20th Century Studios, Disney Experiences, Disney Music Group, Disney Theatrical Group, National Geographic, ABC, FX Networks, Disney Channel, Disney Jr., Disney XD, and Freeform. Disney is the majority owner of ESPN.
See: List of assets owned by The Walt Disney Company.
Netflix
Owns Netflix and many of the films and television series released on the service.
NBCUniversal
Owns Peacock, Universal Pictures, Universal Television, Universal Destinations & Experiences, NBC, Cozi TV, NBCSN, NBC American Crimes, NBC Sports, NBC News, NBC Owned Television Stations, NBC Sports Regional Networks, Focus Features, Illumination, DreamWorks Animation, Telemundo, TeleXitos, Universo, and Bravo. NBCUniversal is a subsidiary of Comcast. Brian L. Roberts is the controlling shareholder of Comcast.
See: List of assets owned by NBCUniversal.
Skydance
Owns HBO Max, Paramount+, Warner Bros. Pictures, Paramount Pictures, Warner Bros. Television, Paramount Television Studios, Warner Bros. Games, HBO, DC Studios, CBS, CBS Studios, CBS Sports, CBS News and Stations, CNN, Skydance Animation, Skydance Sports, Showtime, Nickelodeon, Paramount Network, Comedy Central, BET, MTV, Pop TV, TV Land, CMT, Pluto TV, Cinemax, Cartoon Network, Adult Swim, TBS, TNT, TruTV, Turner Classic Movies, Discovery Channel, TLC, Animal Planet, HGTV, Food Network, Magnolia Network, Cooking Channel, Travel Channel, Investigation Discovery, Oprah Winfrey Network, Science Channel, TNT Sports (including Bleacher Report), Start TV (50% owned), Dabl (operated by Weigel), and The CW (a joint venture with Nexstar Media Group). David Ellison and his father Larry Ellison together hold a majority stake in the company.
Sony Pictures Entertainment
Owns Sony Pictures Entertainment Motion Picture Group (including Columbia Pictures, TriStar Pictures, and Sony Pictures Animation), Sony Pictures Television, and Crunchyroll. Operates cable networks, Game Show Network and Sony Movie Channel, and digital multicast networks, Get. and Game Show Central. The company is a subsidiary of Japanese conglomerate Sony.
Fox Corporation
Owns Fox One, Fox, Movies! (50% owned), Fox Sports, Fox News, Fox Business, Fox Television Stations, Bento Box Entertainment, and Tubi. Lachlan Murdoch is a significant minority shareholder in Fox Corporation.
See: List of assets owned by Fox Corporation.
Versant
Owns CNBC, USA Network, MS NOW, Golf Channel, E!, Syfy, Oxygen, and Fandango Media. Brian L. Roberts is the controlling shareholder of Versant.
Lionsgate Studios
Owns Lionsgate Films and Lionsgate Television.
AMC Global Media
Owns AMC+, AMC, Acorn TV, BBC America, IFC, Hidive, Allblk, WE TV, Independent Film Company, Shudder, RLJE Films, and Sundance TV. James Dolan and his family are the controlling shareholders of AMC Networks.
See: List of assets owned by AMC Networks.

=== Print ===
The New York Times Company
Owns The New York Times, The New York Times Magazine, T: The New York Times Style Magazine, The New York Times Book Review, The New York Times International Edition, The Athletic, The New York Times Games, and Wirecutter. The Ochs-Sulzberger family has been the controlling shareholder of The New York Times Company since its patriarch, Adolph Ochs, purchased it in 1896.
See: List of assets owned by the New York Times Company.
News Corp
Owns Dow Jones & Company (The Wall Street Journal, Barron's, Investor's Business Daily, and MarketWatch), the New York Post, and book publisher HarperCollins. Lachlan Murdoch is a significant minority shareholder in News Corp.
See: List of assets owned by News Corp.
Bloomberg L.P.
Owns Bloomberg News (Bloomberg Businessweek, Bloomberg Markets, Bloomberg Television, and Bloomberg Radio) and produces the Bloomberg Terminal which is used by financial professionals to access market data and news. Bloomberg is owned by Michael Bloomberg.
Advance Publications
Owns Condé Nast (publisher of The New Yorker, Vanity Fair, Vogue, Bon Appétit, GQ, Architectural Digest, Wired, and Condé Nast Traveler), American City Business Journals, several local newspapers, and a plurality stake in Reddit. Advance is controlled by the Newhouse family.
Nash Holdings
Owns The Washington Post. Nash Holdings is owned by Jeff Bezos.

=== Record labels ===
Universal Music Group
Largest of the "Big Three" record labels. The Bolloré family, through Vivendi, holds the plurality stake in the company.
Sony Music Entertainment
Second-largest of the "Big Three" record labels. As its name implies, it is a subsidiary of Japanese conglomerate Sony.
Warner Music Group
Third-largest of the "Big Three" record labels. Len Blavatnik, through his company Access Industries, is the controlling shareholder of Warner Music Group.

=== Video games ===
Sony Interactive Entertainment
Largest video game company in the United States. It produces PlayStation video game consoles and services. It is a subsidiary of Japanese conglomerate Sony.
Valve Corporation
Third-largest video game company in the United States. It is the developer of digital distribution service and storefront Steam. Founder Gabe Newell holds the majority stake.
Electronic Arts
Fourth-largest video game company in the United States. EA is owned by the government of Saudi Arabia, through its Public Investment Fund.
Epic Games
Fifth-largest video game company in the United States. Founder Tim Sweeney holds the plurality stake, with the remainder divided among Chinese conglomerate Tencent, The Walt Disney Company, Sony and others.
Take-Two Interactive
Sixth-largest video game company in the United States. Take-Two is publicly held.
Roblox Corporation
Seventh-largest video game company in the United States. It is the developer of game platform Roblox and has been publicly held since 2021.

=== Radio ===
SiriusXM
Owns satellite radio service SiriusXM and internet radio service Pandora.
iHeartMedia
Owns 860 radio stations in 160 markets, iHeartRadio, Premiere Networks, and Mediabase.
Cumulus Media
Owns 428 radio stations in 87 markets and Westwood One.
Townsquare Media
Owns 321 radio stations in 67 markets.
Audacy
Owns 235 radio stations in 48 markets and Audacy. Soros Fund Management holds a controlling stake in Audacy.

=== Local television ===
Nexstar Media Group
Owns or operates over 260 television stations in 116 markets. It also owns The CW (a joint venture with Skydance Corporation), NewsNation, Antenna TV, Rewind TV, and The Hill.
See: List of stations owned or operated by Nexstar Media Group.
Sinclair Broadcast Group
Owns or operates 294 television stations in 89 markets. It also owns Tennis Channel, Comet, Charge!, The Nest, and Roar, and a minority stake in the E. W. Scripps Company.
See: List of stations owned or operated by Sinclair Broadcast Group.
Gray Media
Owns or operates 180 television stations in 113 markets.
See: List of stations owned or operated by Gray Media.
E. W. Scripps Company
Owns or operates 62 television stations in 43 markets. It also owns Ion Television, Ion Mystery, Ion Plus, Laff, Court TV, Grit, Bounce TV, and Scripps News.: See: E. W. Scripps Company#Television stations
Allen Media Group
Owns or operates 18 television stations in 13 markets. It also owns The Weather Channel, theGrio, seven cable channels operated under the umbrella of Entertainment Studios Networks, and (via a brokerage agreement) two hours of nightly airtime on the CBS network. Allen Media Group is owned by Byron Allen.

== History of FCC regulations ==
The First Amendment to the United States Constitution included a provision that protected "freedom of the press" from Congressional action. For newspapers and other print items, in which the medium itself was practically infinite and publishers could produce as many publications as they wanted without interfering with any other publisher's ability to do the same, this was not a problem.

The debut of radio broadcasting in the first part of the 20th century complicated matters; the radio spectrum is finite, and only a limited number of broadcasters could use the medium at the same time. The United States government opted to declare the entire broadcast spectrum to be government property and license the rights to use the spectrum to broadcasters. After several years of experimental broadcast licensing, the United States licensed its first commercial radio station, KDKA, in 1920.

Prior to 1927, public airwaves in the United States were regulated by the United States Department of Commerce and largely litigated in the courts as the growing number of stations fought for space in the burgeoning industry. In the earliest days, radio stations were typically required to share the same standard frequency (833 kHz) and were not allowed to broadcast an entire day, instead having to sign on and off at designated times to allow competing stations to use the frequency.

The Federal Radio Act of 1927 (signed into law February 23, 1927) nationalized the airwaves and formed the Federal Radio Commission, the forerunner of the modern Federal Communications Commission (FCC) to assume control of the airwaves. One of the first moves of the FRC was General Order 40, the first U.S. bandplan, which allocated permanent frequencies for most U.S. stations and eliminated most of the part-time broadcasters.

=== Communications Act of 1934 ===
The Communications Act of 1934 was the stepping stone for all of the communications rules that are in place today. When first enacted, it created the FCC (Federal Communications Commission). It was created to regulate the telephone monopolies, but also regulate the licensing for the spectrum used for broadcasting. The FCC was given authority by Congress to give out licenses to companies to use the broadcasting spectrum. However, they had to determine whether the license would serve "the public interest, convenience, and necessity". The primary goal for the FCC, from the start, has been to serve the "public interest". A debated concept, the term "public interest" was provided with a general definition by the Federal Radio Commission. The Commission determined, in its 1928 annual report, that "the emphasis must be first and foremost on the interest, the convenience, and the necessity of the listening public, and not on the interest, convenience, or necessity of the individual broadcaster or the advertiser." Following this reasoning, early FCC regulations reflected the presumption that "it would not be in the public's interest for a single entity to hold more than one broadcast license in the same community. The view was that the public would benefit from a diverse array of owners because it would lead to a diverse array of program and service viewpoints."

The Communications Act of 1934 refined and expanded on the authority of the FCC to regulate public airwaves in the United States, combining and reorganizing provisions from the Federal Radio Act of 1927 and the Mann-Elkins Act of 1910. It empowered the FCC, among other things, to administer broadcasting licenses, impose penalties and regulate standards and equipment used on the airwaves. The Act also mandated that the FCC would act in the interest of the "public convenience, interest, or necessity." The Act established a system whereby the FCC grants licenses to the spectrum to broadcasters for commercial use, so long as the broadcasters act in the public interest by providing news programming.

Lobbyists from the largest radio broadcasters, ABC and NBC, wanted to establish high fees for broadcasting licenses, but Congress saw this as a limitation upon free speech. Consequently, "the franchise to operate a broadcasting station, often worth millions, is awarded free of charge to enterprises selected under the standard of 'public interest, convenience, or necessity.'"

Nevertheless, radio and television was dominated by the Big Three television networks until the mid-1990s, when the Fox network and UPN and The WB started to challenge that hegemony.

=== Cross-ownership rules of 1975 ===
In 1975, the FCC passed the newspaper and broadcast cross-ownership rule. This ban prohibited the ownership of a daily newspaper and any "full-power broadcast station that serviced the same community". This rule emphasized the need to ensure that a broad number of voices were given the opportunity to communicate via different outlets in each market. Newspapers, explicitly prohibited from federal regulation because of the guarantee of freedom of the press in the First Amendment to the United States Constitution, were out of the FCC's jurisdiction, but the FCC could use the ownership of a newspaper as a preclusion against owning radio or television licenses, which the FCC could and did regulate.

The FCC designed rules to make sure that there is a diversity of voices and opinions on the airwaves. "Beginning in 1975, FCC rules banned cross-ownership by a single entity of a daily newspaper and television or radio broadcast station operating in the same local market." The ruling was put in place to limit media concentration in TV and radio markets, because they use public airwaves, which is a valuable, and now limited, resource.

=== Telecommunications Act 1996 ===
The Telecommunications Act of 1996 was an influential act for media cross-ownership. One of the requirements of the act was that the FCC must conduct a biennial review of its media ownership rules "and shall determine whether any of such rules are necessary in the public interest as the result of competition." The Commission was ordered to "repeal or modify any regulation it determines to be no longer in the public interest."

The legislation, touted as a step that would foster competition, actually resulted in the subsequent mergers of several large companies, a trend which still continues. Over 4,000 radio stations were bought out, and minority ownership of TV stations dropped to its lowest point since the federal government began tracking such data in 1990.

Since the Telecommunications Act of 1996, restrictions on media merging have decreased. Although merging media companies seems to provide positive outcomes for the companies involved in the merger, it might lead to negative outcomes for other companies, viewers and future businesses. The FCC even found that they were indeed negative effects of recent merges in a study that they issued.

=== 21st century ===
In September 2002, the FCC issued a Notice of Proposed Rulemaking stating that the Commission would re-evaluate its media ownership rules pursuant to the obligation specified in the Telecommunications Act of 1996. In June 2003, after its deliberations which included a single public hearing and the review of nearly two-million pieces of correspondence from the public opposing further relaxation of the ownership rules the FCC voted 3-2 to repeal the newspaper/broadcast cross-ownership ban and to make changes to or repeal several of its other ownership rules as well. In the order, the FCC noted that the newspaper/broadcast cross-ownership rule was no longer necessary in the public interest to maintain competition, diversity or localism. However, in 2007 the FCC revised its rules and ruled that they would take it "case-by-case and determine if the cross-ownership would affect the public interest. The rule changes permitted a company to own a newspaper and broadcast station in any of the nation's top 20 media markets as long as there are at least eight media outlets in the market. If the combination included a television station, that station couldn't be in the market's top four. As it has since 2003, Prometheus Radio Project argued that the relaxed rule would pave the way for more media consolidation. Broadcasters, pointing to the increasing competition from new platforms, argued that the FCC's rules—including other ownership regulations that govern TV duopolies and radio ownership—should be relaxed even further. The FCC, meanwhile, defended its right to change the rules either way." That public interest is what the FCC bases its judgments on, whether a media cross-ownership would be a positive and contributive force, locally and nationally.

The FCC held one official forum, February 27, 2003, in Richmond, Virginia in response to public pressures to allow for more input on the issue of elimination of media ownership limits. Some complain that more than one forum was needed.

In 2003 the FCC set out to re-evaluate its media ownership rules specified in the Telecommunications Act of 1996. On June 2, 2003, FCC, in a 3-2 vote under Chairman Michael Powell, approved new media ownership laws that removed many of the restrictions previously imposed to limit ownership of media within a local area. The changes were not, as is customarily done, made available to the public for a comment period.

- Single-company ownership of media in a given market is now permitted up to 45% (formerly 35%, up from 25% in 1985) of that market.
- Restrictions on newspaper and TV station ownership in the same market were removed.
- All TV channels, magazines, newspapers, cable, and Internet services are now counted, weighted based on people's average tendency to find news on that medium. At the same time, whether a channel actually contains news is no longer considered in counting the percentage of a medium owned by one owner.
- Previous requirements for periodic review of license have been changed. Licenses are no longer reviewed for "public-interest" considerations.

The decision by the FCC was overturned by the United States Court of Appeals for the Third Circuit in Prometheus Radio Project v. FCC in June, 2004. The Majority ruled 2-1 against the FCC and ordered the Commission to reconfigure how it justified raising ownership limits. The Supreme Court later turned down an appeal, so the ruling stands.

In June 2006, the FCC adopted a Further Notice of Proposed Rulemaking (FNPR) to address the issues raised by the United States Court of Appeals for the Third Circuit and also to perform the recurring evaluation of the media ownership rules required by the Telecommunications Act. The deliberations would draw upon three formal sources of input:(1) the submission of comments, (2) ten Commissioned studies, and (3) six public hearings.

The FCC in 2007 voted to modestly relax its existing ban on newspaper/broadcast cross-ownership. The FCC voted December 18, 2007 to eliminate some media ownership rules, including a statute that forbids a single company to own both a newspaper and a television or radio station in the same city. FCC Chairman Kevin Martin circulated the plan in October 2007. Martin's justification for the rule change is to ensure the viability of America's newspapers and to address issues raised in the 2003 FCC decision that was later struck down by the courts. The FCC held six hearings around the country to receive public input from individuals, broadcasters and corporations. Because of the lack of discussion during the 2003 proceedings, increased attention has been paid to ensuring that the FCC engages in proper dialogue with the public regarding its current rules change. FCC Commissioners Deborah Taylor-Tate and Robert McDowell joined Chairman Martin in voting in favor of the rule change. Commissioners Michael Copps and Jonathan Adelstein, both Democrats, opposed the change.

=== UHF discount ===
Beginning in 1985, the FCC implemented a rule stating that television stations broadcasting on UHF channels would be "discounted" by half when calculating a broadcaster's total reach, under the market share cap of 39% of U.S. TV households. This rule was implemented because the UHF band was generally considered inferior to VHF for broadcasting analog television. The notion became obsolete since the completion of the transition from analog to digital television in 2009; the majority of television stations now broadcast on the UHF band because, by contrast, it is generally considered superior for digital transmission.

The FCC voted to deprecate the rule in September 2016; the Commission argued that the UHF discount had become technologically obsolete, and that it was now being used as a loophole by broadcasters to contravene its market share rules and increase their market share through consolidation. The existing portfolios of broadcasters who now exceeded the cap due to the change were grandfathered, including the holdings of Ion Media Networks, Tribune Media, and Univision.

However, on April 21, 2017, under new Trump administration FCC commissioner Ajit Pai, the discount was reinstated in a 2-1 vote, led by Pai and commissioner Michael O'Rielly. The move, along with a plan to evaluate increasing the national ownership cap, is expected to trigger a wider wave of consolidation in broadcast television. A challenge to the rule's restoration was filed on May 15 by The Institute for Public Representation (a coalition of public interest groups comprising Free Press, the United Church of Christ, Media Mobilizing Project, the Prometheus Radio Project, the National Hispanic Media Coalition and Common Cause), which requested an emergency motion to stay the UHF discount order – delaying its June 5 re-implementation – pending a court challenge to the rule. The groups re-affirmed that the rule was technologically obsolete, and was restored for the purpose of allowing media consolidation. The FCC rejected the claims, stating that the discount would only allow forward a regulatory review of any station group acquisitions, and that the Institute for Public Representation's criteria for the stay fell short of meeting adequate determination in favor of it by the court; it also claimed that the discount was "inextricably linked" to the agency's media ownership rules, a review of which it initiated in May of that year.

The challenge and subsequent stay motion was partly filed as a reaction to Sinclair Broadcast Group's proposed acquisition of Tribune Media (announced on May 8), which – with the more than 230 stations that the combined company would have, depending on any divestitures in certain markets where both groups own stations – would expand the group's national reach to 78% of all U.S. households with at least one television set with the discount. On June 1, 2017, the District of Columbia Court of Appeals issued a seven-day administrative stay to the UHF discount rulemaking to review the emergency stay motion. The D.C. Court of Appeals denied the emergency stay motion in a one-page memorandum on June 15, 2017, however, the merits of restoring the discount is still subject to a court appeal proceeding scheduled to occur at a later date.

Following this, in November 2017, the FCC voted 3-2 along partisan lines to eliminate the cross-ownership ban against owning multiple media outlets in the same local market, as well as increasing the number of television stations that one entity may own in a local market. Pai argued the removal of the ban was necessary for local media to compete with online information sources like Google and Facebook. The decision was appealed by advocacy groups, and in September 2019, the Third Circuit struck down the rule change in a 2-1 decision, with the majority opinion stating the FCC "did not adequately consider the effect its sweeping rule changes will have on ownership of broadcast media by women and racial minorities." Pai stated plans to appeal this ruling. The FCC petitioned to the Supreme Court under FCC v. Prometheus Radio Project. The Supreme Court ruled unanimously in April 2021 to reverse the Third Circuit's ruling, stating that the FCC's rule changes did not violate the Administrative Procedure Act, and that there was no Congressional mandate for the FCC to consider the impact on minority ownership of its rulemaking, thus allowing the FCC to proceed with relaxation of media cross-ownership rules.

== Local content ==
A 2008 study found that news stations operated by a small media company produced more local news and more locally produced video than large chain-based broadcasting groups. It was then argued that the FCC claimed, in 2003, that larger media groups produced better quality local content. Research by Philip Napoli and Michael Yan showed that larger media groups actually produced less local content. In a different study, they also showed that "ownership by one of the big four broadcast networks has been linked to a considerable decrease in the amount of televised local public affairs programming"

The major reasoning the FCC made for deregulation was that with more capital, broadcasting organizations could produce more and better local content. However, the research studies by Napoli and Yan showed that once teamed-up, they produced less content. Cross ownership between broadcasting and newspapers is a complicated issue. The FCC believes that more deregulation is necessary. However, with research studies showing that they produced less local content - less voices being heard that are from within the communities. While less local voices are heard, more national-based voices do appear. Chain-based companies are using convergence, the same content being produced across multiple mediums, to produce this mass-produced content. It is cheaper and more efficient than having to run different local and national news. However, with convergence and chain-based ownership you can choose which stories to run and how the stories are heard - being able to be played in local communities and national stage.

== Media consolidation debate ==
=== Robert W. McChesney ===
Robert McChesney is an advocate for media reform, and the co-founder of Free Press, which was established in 2003. His work is based on theoretical, normative, and empirical evidence suggesting that media regulation efforts should be more strongly oriented towards maintaining a healthy balance of diverse viewpoints in the media environment. However, his viewpoints on current regulation are; "there is every bit as much regulation by government as before, only now it is more explicitly directed to serve large corporate interests."

McChesney believes that the Free Press' objective is a more diverse and competitive commercial system with a significant nonprofit and noncommercial sector. It would be a system built for the citizens, but most importantly - it would be accessible to anyone who wants to broadcast. Not only specifically the big corporations that can afford to broadcast nationally, but more importantly locally. McChesney suggests that to better our current system we need to "establish a bona fide noncommercial public radio and television system, with local and national stations and networks. The expense should come out of the general budget"

=== Benjamin Compaine ===
Benjamin Compaine believes that the current media system is "one of the most competitive major industries in U.S. commerce." He believes that much of the media in the United States is operating in the same market. He also believes that all the content is being interchanged between different media.

Compaine believes that due to convergence, two or more things coming together, the media has been saved. Because of the ease of access to send the same message across multiple and different mediums, the message is more likely to be heard. He also believes that due to the higher amount of capital and funding, the media outlets are able to stay competitive because they are trying to reach more listeners or readers by using newer media.

Benjamin Compaine's main argument is that the consolidation of media outlets, across multiple ownerships, has allowed for a better quality of content. He also stated that the news is interchangeable, and as such, making the media market less concentrated than previously thought, the idea being that since the same story is being pushed across multiple different platforms, then it can only be counted as one news story from multiple sources. Compaine also believed the news is more readily available, making it far easier for individuals to access than traditional methods.

=== American public distrust in the media ===
A 2012 Gallup poll found that Americans' distrust in the mass media had hit a new high, with 60% saying they had little or no trust in the mass media to report the news fully, accurately, and fairly. Distrust had increased since the previous few years, when Americans were already more negative about the media than they had been in the years before 2004.

=== Music industry ===
Critics of media consolidation in broadcast radio say it has made the music played more homogeneous, and makes it more difficult for acts to gain local popularity. They also believe it has reduced the demographic diversity of popular music, pointing to a study which found representation of women in country music charts at 11.3% from 2000 to 2018.

Critics cite centralized control as having increased artist self-censorship, and several incidents of artists being banned from a large number of broadcast stations all at once. After the controversy caused by criticism of President George W. Bush and the Iraq War by a member of the Dixie Chicks, the band was banned by Cumulus Media and Clear Channel Communications, which also organized pro-war demonstrations. After the Super Bowl XXXVIII wardrobe malfunction, CBS CEO Les Moonves reportedly banned Janet Jackson from all CBS and Viacom properties, including MTV, VH1, the 46th Annual Grammy Awards, and Infinity Broadcasting Corporation radio stations, impacting sales of her album Damita Jo.

=== News ===
Critics point out that media consolidation has allowed Sinclair Broadcast Group to require hundreds of local stations to run editorials by Boris Epshteyn (an advisor to Donald Trump), terrorism alerts, and anti-John Kerry documentary Stolen Honor, and even to force local news anchors to read an editorial mirroring Trump's denunciation of the news media for bias and fake news.

== See also ==
- Alternative media
- Big Three television networks
- Concentration of media ownership
- Fourth television network
- Mainstream media
- Major film studios
- Media bias
- Media conglomerate
- Media democracy
- Media imperialism
- Media manipulation
- Media proprietor
- Media transparency
- Monopolies of knowledge
- Old media
- Politico-media complex
- Propaganda model
- State controlled media
- Telecommunications Act of 1996
- Western media
- Television in the United States
