= WSCA-LP =

- Portsmouth, New Hampshire; United States
- Broadcast area: Seacoast Region
- Frequency: 106.1 MHz

Programming
- Format: Community radio
- Affiliations: Pacifica Radio Network

Ownership
- Owner: Seacoasts Arts And Cultural Alliance

History
- First air date: September 12, 2004
- Call sign meaning: Seacoast

Technical information
- Licensing authority: FCC
- Facility ID: 126863
- Class: L1
- ERP: 100 watts
- HAAT: 28.8 meters (94 ft)
- Transmitter coordinates: 43°6′3.7″N 70°48′43.8″W

Links
- Public license information: LMS
- Webcast: Listen live
- Website: wscafm.org

WSCA-LP (106.1 FM) is a low-power community radio station in Portsmouth, New Hampshire; the mission of Portsmouth Community Radio is to operate a nonprofit, listener supported, volunteer driven, non-commercial FM community radio station dedicated to serving the greater Portsmouth community.

== History ==
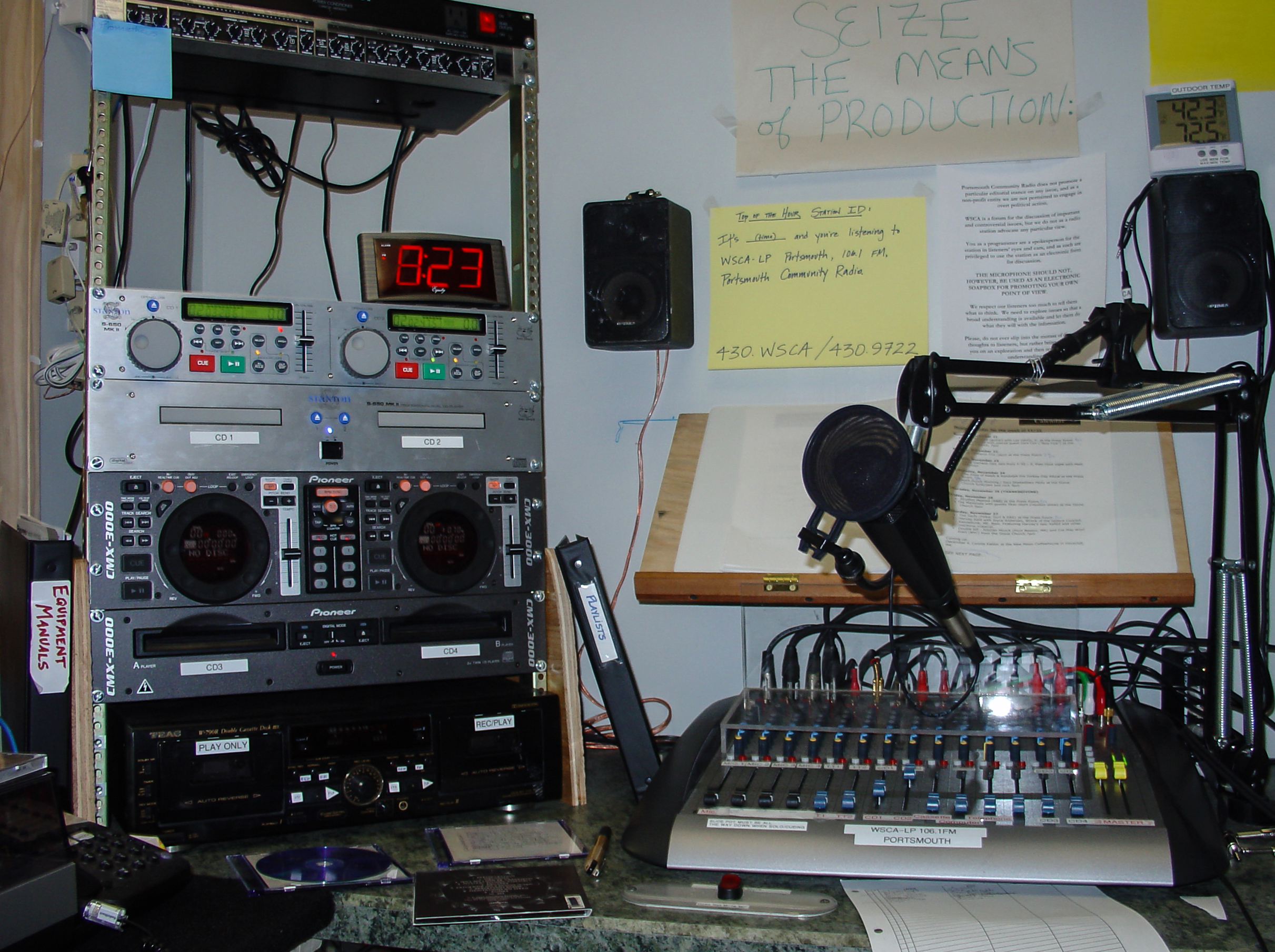
Original studio set-up in November 2004.

WSCA-LP began broadcasting on September 12, 2004. Its launch came at the end of a three-day Prometheus Radio Project "barnraising" event during which time a vacant factory space was converted into a fully functional radio station. More than 200 volunteers attended the event from several distant states as well as Canada and England.

The station's parent organization is the Seacoast Arts and Cultural Alliance.

=== Political significance ===
Judd Gregg, then-senator and former governor of New Hampshire, led the opposition to the U.S. Federal Communications Commission's plans to license low-power radio stations, most notably by sponsoring the Radio Broadcasting Preservation Act. Prometheus Technical Director Pete Tridish said the group "wanted to help build a station right in the state of the man in the Senate, Senator Judd Gregg, who has done the most to oppose community radio." Gregg's senatorial challenger, Doris "Granny D" Haddock was invited to speak at the barnraising.

== Programming ==
Portsmouth Community Radio is a mixed format station. Like many community stations it broadcasts diverse and alternative programming, most of which is produced locally and reflects the cultural, educational, artistic, civic, and business fabric of the listening community. It has become known for its original public affairs programs, which number more than those of the local NPR affiliate.

== See also ==
- List of community radio stations in the United States
