= Minority ownership of media outlets in the United States =

Minority ownership of media outlets in the United States is the concept of having ownership of media outlets to reflect the demographic population of the area which the media serves. This is to help ensure that media addresses issues that are of concern to the needs and interests of the local population.

== Federal Communications ==
The Federal Communications Commission (FCC) is charged by federal law to ensure that the people of the United States have access to "rapid, efficient, Nationwide, and worldwide wire and radio communication service with adequate facilities at reasonable prices" Their longstanding policy and mandate is to make sure that there is access to communications for all, and this access is not discriminatory, especially in relationship to one's race or gender. For many decades a pillar to the policies that the FCC followed was that of "competition, diversity, and localism" and this policy guided its decisions on "regulating media ownership" was first created by United States Congress through the Communications Act of 1934. Ever since its inception, one of the main goals of the Commission is to ensure that without the discrimination, all people of the United States would have access to "rapid, efficient, Nationwide, and world-wide wire and radio communication service with adequate facilities"

The FCC also was required by law to monitor and distribute a limited resource, the spectrum available for broadcast via the airwaves, in such a way that is to the maximum benefit of the people of the United States. From the very first section of the Act that institutionalized the FCC was the declaration that these services would not be withheld on the basis of "race, color, religion, national origin, or sex" To accomplish these goals, policies were crafted to ensure that consumers were able to have access to multiple voices, and that at least some of the precious resource of spectrum would be used for to give voice to educational, nonprofit, and diverse voice. Since the FCC controlled the regulation of information that was broadcast over the airwaves or traveled by wire, this eventually included granting licenses for television, radio, cable, and media outlets. For many years licenses were granted freely, but rather arbitrarily to organizations who were able to demonstrate to the commissioners their ability to serve the public with the bandwidth they were granted. Also the FCC would give consideration to applicants by "broadcasting content, the limits placed on explicit program regulation by the U.S. Constitution,...the economic importance," and following the goals of the FCC.

The ownership of media outlets is often strongly tied to freedom of speech, advocates for minority rights say that only through ownership of an outlet can a group be assured of a voice in the media marketplace. The philosophical background to seeking to ensure that media ownership be treated as a public good is credited to James Madison. His concept was that it is essential to have avenues of free speech to assure political equality, particularly if there are economic inequalities involved. Since the 1940s the FCC had several rules in place that helped protect diversity in the media, these included that no company could own: more than one major TV network; more than one TV station in the same local media market (unless there were at least eight stations in that market); more than one AM station while at the same time owning more than one FM station in the same market; both a radio and TV station in the same market; or both a daily newspaper and a broadcast station in the same market. Even in the 1960s there was a growing concern over the ownership of media as an important tool for free speech. Law professor Jerome Barron wrote, "the modern world is witnessing at present a Political Revolution as searing and as consequential as the Industrial Revolution, a revolution which has concentrated coercive power and thought control in a few hands. Power...has shifted from those who control the "means of production" to "those who control the media of mass communication"" It has been a concern since the publication of the first black owned newspaper in 1827, that well-meaning groups were trying to represent the interest of minorities without, "becoming acquainted with the true state of things."

In recognition of this unique problem, in 1978 the FCC adapted a "Statement of Policy on Minority Ownership of Broadcast Facilities" This not only recognized the importance of minority ownership, but also provided tax incentives and special assessment when applying for licenses to media outlets. Also, a media owner who was in danger of losing their license could sell their outlet to another minority owned firm as long as it was approved by the FCC. This sale had to be at a reduced price, not more than 75% of its market value Even after years of having these policies in place, only 3.26% of all commercial broadcasting television stations are owned by minorities, and only 4.97% are owned by women.

Even the very definition of what constitutes a minority owned media outlet is highly debated. The issues of equity ownership and control are an important element in defining what is indeed a minority owned media outlet. Minority ownership includes outlets owned by women, African-Americans, Hispanic-Americans, Asian-Americans, or Native Americans. Ownership is often not easily defined as to raise capital for operating expenses or expansion firms that were started as minority owned often include substantial non-minority shareholders.

== Legal Challenges to the FCC's Minority Ownership Policies: Metro Broadcasting, Inc. v. FCC ==
For many years the FCC's policies to give opportunities, and sometimes even preference, to new minority run stations in underserved areas went unchallenged. In 1983, two companies applied for the same television broadcasting license in the Orlando area. The broadcasting license was initially granted to Metro Broadcasting, Inc., but then the license was reviewed and given to another company, Rainbow Broadcasting because it was under 90% Hispanic-American ownership, therefore meeting the qualifications for being minority owned. This initial granting, and then revoking, the license caused a quick reaction. Metro Broadcasting sued the FCC and case, known as Metro Broadcasting v. FCC, eventually came to the Supreme Court. The charges were that the FCC policy of favoring minorities violated the equal protection clause. The Supreme Court ruled that, "The FCC policies do not violate equal protection, since they bear the imprimatur of longstanding congressional support and direction and are substantially related to the achievement of the important governmental objective of broadcast diversity Pp. 563-601". Therefore, the court found that the FCC policy did not violate equal protection because it was promoting a long held goal of not just the FCC but also Congress and the United States government in promoting broadcasting outlets that speak to all the people represented in a community. This ruling was also significant in that it confirmed the constitutionality of affirmative action policies that promoted diversity rather than simply redressing past discrimination.

Even though the Metro Broadcasting, Inc. v. FCC decision was seen by some observers as, " an important element in the schema of vital civil guarantees that must be maintained and even expanded," the ruling was effectively overturned by another suit, Adarand Constructors, Inc. v. Peña, which stipulated that the federal government hold to "strict scrutiny" when reviewing claims against policies that are trying to further compelling interests of the government.

== Congressional Support of Minority Ownership Policies: Minority Telecommunications Development Program ==
As part of the U.S. government's efforts to increase the opportunity for minority ownership of media outlets the National Telecommunications and Information Administration (NTIA) has administered a program since the late 1970s known as the Minority Telecommunications Development Program (MTDP). Part of the responsibility of this program, which is run under the U.S. Department of Commerce, is to establish the definition of a minority owned commercial broadcasting unit, monitor the number of active licenses for minority ownership, and how to best facilitate ownership of media outlets.

Despite efforts of the FCC, the NTIA, and the MTDP, the proportion of broadcast outlets owned by minorities is still low compared to their portion of the population. "Since 1990 when MTDP began collecting data on minority commercial broadcast ownership in the United States, African Americans, Asian Americans, Hispanic Americans, and Native Americans have consistently been underrepresented among the Nation's commercial broadcast owners. Ranging from a low of 2.7 percent in 1991 to a high of 3.8 percent in 2000, minorities' ownership of commercial broadcast facilities has remained far below their estimated 29 percent representation in the U.S. population". Even though the number of broadcasting licenses owned by minority-owned companies has grown, the overall percentage of ownership has actually declined. This is especially predominant in the television broadcasting industry, "Minority owners' share of the commercial television market decreased in 2000. The 23 full power commercial television stations owned by minorities in 2000 represented 1.9 percent of the country's 1,288 such licensed stations. This is the lowest level since MTDP began issuing reports in 1990."

== FCC Policies Adapt to Market Forces: Changes in Media Ownership Policies ==
Over many years the traditional limitations on cross media ownership controlled by the FCC started to weaken. More media outlets grew in number and major companies, started to consolidate newspaper and television ownership. In the 1980s and early 1990s there was general pressure to reduce government regulation and increase market forces. There was also growing pressure to have the FCC use bandwidth and the licensing of radio, television and other devices as a source of revenue for the people of the United States. In 1993, the U.S. Congress authorized the FCC to grant licenses to auction bandwidth. The potential monetization of this limited resource by large corporations made it extremely valuable. To be able to compete for bandwidth brought even more pressure for large corporations to try to consolidate. It was obvious that both technology and market forces were changing rapidly. Subsequently, the U.S. Congress passed the Telecommunications Act of 1996. This required the FCC to review their ownership rules every four years.

== FCC Major Policy Revisions: Telecommunications Act of 1996 ==
The FCC issued sweeping changes through the Telecommunications Act of 1996. This included major changes to the guidelines that determined who would be eligible for ownership of media outlets. The restrictions of cross ownership were greatly relaxed, which made it even more difficult for minorities to financially compete with the growing conglomerates who were amassing media outlets. The FCC determined "that the existing rules were no longer in the public interest, repealed them, and replaced them with a single set of Cross-Media Limits using a methodological tool called the 'Diversity Index'." This decision was based on treating media ownership like many business entities in a market situation where the government only has an interest to keep a competitive and free market. This would be presuming that all voices represented an equal possible strength, as in a business situation where each producer of a similar commodity has an equal chance of success and all will serve the market equally. Therefore, the FCC evaluated market concentration using a highly modified Herfindahl-Hirschman Index, which is used by the U.S. Department of Justice to evaluate proposed mergers and acquisitions to prevent monopolies. However, the FCC added their "" to allow for the obvious inability of the Herfindahl-Hirschman to truly measure market concentration. This ruling was challenged in court, and the resulting judgement, Prometheus Radio Project v. Federal Communications Commission: United States of America, found that the FCC was in violation of Congressional mandate and had failed to "consider proposals to promote minority broadcast ownership that the Minority Media and Telecommunications Council had submitted." Overall, the court found that the FCC had failed to justify their changes in cross-media ownership and the new rules were not implemented. The court stated that, " we must hold unlawful and set aside agency findings, and conclusions that are arbitrary, capricious, or an abuse of discretion, or not in accordance with law...[or] unsupported by substantial evidence."

== Court Challenges to Protect Minority Ownership Policies: Prometheus Radio Project v. FCC ==
After the 2002 FCC Biennial Regulatory Review, the FCC continued its movement towards implementing more relaxed ownership standards. A non-profit media advocacy group called Prometheus Radio Project filed suit to block these changes. This case was heard by the U.S. Court of Appeals for the 3rd Circuit and is commonly known as Prometheus Radio Project v. FCC. The court found that the new policies of the TC Policy Act of 1996 were in violation of both Congress' long-standing mandate to promote diversity in media outlet ownership. The sections that were remanded covered several areas, but the outstanding issues that the court asked the FCC to address primarily concerned ways to ensure access for minority representation in ownership of media outlets. This goal is supported not only by Congressional mandate, but also confirmed by the Supreme Court as an important policy the FCC must consider in their rule revisions.

== Current Trends That Effect Minority Ownership of Media Outlets ==
=== Overall Media Ownership Consolidation ===
One of the major changes in the guidelines for media ownership is the number of outlets that one entity can own. The original media ownership guidelines were established to encourage competition and diversity. This is to ensure that each community would have the opportunity to have different voices owning media outlets. Media producers proposed that by consolidated ownership they could produce better quality programming at a lower price. These business owners ask that the FCC relax their ownership rules.

There are many economic arguments for allowing media outlets to consolidate. Through shared resources one company can produce news and information for television, radio, and newspapers, this reduces production costs and allows the company to invest in better production facilities and improve the quality of their broadcasting. Some proponents of media consolidation also claim that viewers "vote" by choosing to watch a station and that is why it grows in market power. If a station grows in market power it can in turn command more advertising revenue and then eventually acquire other media outlets.

Many of the FCC rules and regulations were originally designed to encourage competition and prevent a high concentration of ownership. However, with the relaxation of these rules there has been a fundamental change in the balance of media ownership. "Regardless of the methods used, research documents increasing consolidation across all areas that make up the media industries, with many industries reaching "highly concentrated" status, indicating that the industry is dominated by a handful of firms."

=== Shared Resource Agreements ===
Larger communities normally have more media outlets, the larger population presents a wide commercial base for television, radio, and newspapers. Markets that are ethnically diverse often have outlets that operate in different languages. However, true diversity in markets is not always easy to measure. Smaller outlets often have agreements where they share content or staff to reduce costs. Because of these operating agreements it is very hard to measure how many media outlets are producing independent and local news. Some of these sharing agreements are intended to simplify management or share resources that would otherwise be duplicated and allow the media outlets to remain competitive and financially sustainable. However, in December 2011 the FCC was reexamining sharing agreements because of the potential to limit localism and diversity in reporting and reduce choices for the consumer.

== Programs to Improve Minority Ownership of Media Outlets ==
One of the major obstacles to minority ownership of media, and producing quality programming that will attract consumers and present a sustainable solution is financing the large amount of money it takes to purchase and operate a media outlet. Since the 1996 Telecommunications Act many media outlets have been purchased by large corporations, driving up the prices of outlets. This raises barriers for entry into the market for small or new entities. To help overcome these hurdles and achieve the objective of having more minority-owned outlets the government has started several initiatives. These initiatives include facilitating sale of "distress sale" licenses to minority owned firms and encouraging banks to utilize Small Business Administration (SBA) guaranteed loan programs as well as making it easier for larger companies to sell to a minority firm a cluster of stations, "grandfathered" licenses bought before the FCC broadcast ownership rules were changed.

=== Tax Relief and Incentives ===
The primary process in which the government has offered incentives to media ownership is through tax relief. According to section 1071 of the IRS code, the FCC issues tax certificates that grant deferment of capital gains taxes. There also has been a minority tax certificate program for many decades.

=== Debate over Accurate Data Collection ===
One of the results of the Adarand Constructors, Inc. v. Peña ruling is that to continue policies which would favor a particular sector of society, there must be empirical evidence that this federal policy is truly needed. In documentation for the 2010 Quadrennial Review, there were concerns that the FCC had not collected the necessary data to authenticate minority ownership. They acknowledged that the FCC had tried to establish current and correct data on minority ownership before the 2000 review, yet this data collection was largely abandoned until the preparations for the 2010 review.

In May 2009 the FCC improved data collection and revised Form 323 so that, "is incorporated into the database that is searchable, and can be aggregated and cross-referenced." Yet the announcement that any data collected would not be used to make any decisions until the 2014 Quadrennial Review caused many civil rights groups to formally protest this decision as they claim it allows for further media consolidation.

== Alternative Media Outlets for Minorities ==
Even though radio and television are used by many Americans, with over 235 million accessing radio alone every week, there are a growing number of outlets for minorities and other special interest groups to broadcast information.

=== Low Power FM ===
Low Power FM stations were created by the FCC in 2000 to allow FM broadcasts to a neighborhood or community. These are non-commercial in nature and can by run community groups, churches, special interest groups, or individuals. They have a very limited range but their signal is able to be received by anyone in the area with an FM radio. The cost is fairly low to run and the information contained is very local. Low Power FM stations have grown in popularity, with over 800 active stations.

=== Internet Based Media ===
An increasingly greater number of Internet-based news and information sites are being owned and operated by minorities and individuals. The ease of entry into this market is very high and the cost to start an Internet-based outlet is very low. They can be easily designed to reach a target market and can be updated very easily. They are seen by major broadcasters as a "competitive reality" that will change the ways in which consumers of all backgrounds access information.
