= Northampton High School (Massachusetts) =

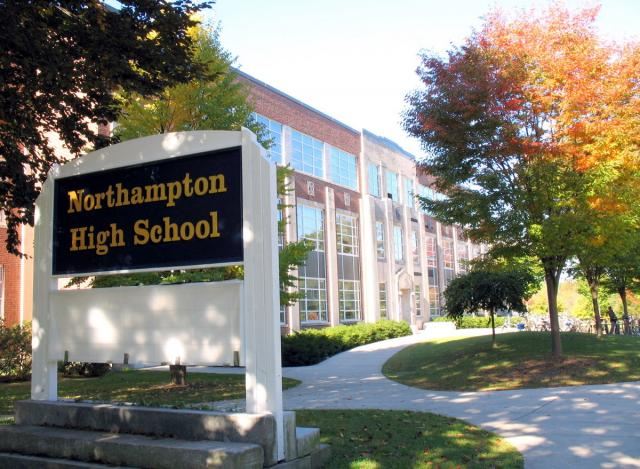

Location
- 380 Elm Street; Northampton, MA 01060; United States
- 42°19′31″N 72°39′03″W

Information
- School type: Public; Open enrollment Public
- Motto: Scientia est Bona (Knowledge is good)
- Founded: 1899
- School district: Northampton Public Schools
- NCES District ID: 2508850
- Superintendent: Dr. Portia Bonner
- CEEB code: 221592
- NCES School ID: 250885001432
- Principal: Ben Taglieri
- Grades: 9–12
- Enrollment: 875 (2024-25)
- Campuses: 1
- Colors: Blue and gold
- Mascot: The Blue Devil
- Rival: Amherst
- Newspaper: The Devils Advocate
- Yearbook: Nesaki
- Budget: $12,528 per pupil
- Website: nhs.northamptonschools.org

Northampton High School is a four-year secondary school located in the city of Northampton, Massachusetts, United States.

== Student body ==
As of 2024 the student body is composed of 875 students, supported by 75 staff members.

== Theater program ==
Northampton High's theater program was under the direction of Stephen Eldredge from his hire in 2005 until his departure in 2022. The theater program is now under the direction of David Grout. Eldredge has acted, directed and taught theater in New York, San Francisco and New England for over 30 years.

Within the school is a 709-seat proscenium theater. A black box theater was added in 2012, providing an alternative performing, with room for 75 audience members. There is also a small theater which seats 90; it is used primarily for the school's chorus, chamber choir, and the a cappella group The Northamptones. The seats were salvaged from Pleasant Street Theater, a defunct movie theater in downtown Northampton. In the spring, senior students are given the opportunity to produce, direct, and put up a show of their own in the Black Box. The theater program is also run by a well sized theater tech program, also previously directed by Steve Eldredge and now directed by David Grout.

== Athletics ==
Athletics include varsity teams in football, soccer, swimming, baseball, basketball, lacrosse, wrestling, track and field, cross country, field hockey, fencing, skiing, crew, and ultimate frisbee.

== Robotics ==
The school was home to the Northampton Devilbots, FIRST Robotics Competition (FRC) Team 4097, a regionally ranked team. The team was previously conjoined with a nearby school, Smith Vocational and Agricultural High School, however the team split from Smith Vocational and Agricultural High school in 2018.

== Northampton Open Media ==
Northampton Open Media, a non-profit community media center, shares with the school. Although not officially affiliated with the High School, Northampton Open Media’s equipment and resources are made available to students to for school and community media and art projects. The high school's theater and technology programs often work together.

== Notable incidents ==
In 2026, a woman visiting the school had a physical altercation with a student and was subsequently arrested. She reportedly attacked the student due to a "prior issue". Both the woman and the student suffered injuries.

== Notable alumni ==
- Abby Snow Belden (1896–1969), physical educator and outdoorswoman
- William Stringfellow (1928-1985), theologian, lawyer and social activist
- Willy Workman (born 1990), American-Israeli basketball player for Israeli team Maccabi Haifa
- David Pakman (born 1984), Argentinian-American political pundit, academic, and host of The David Pakman Show
