= Pasquo, Tennessee =

Pasquo
- Neighborhood
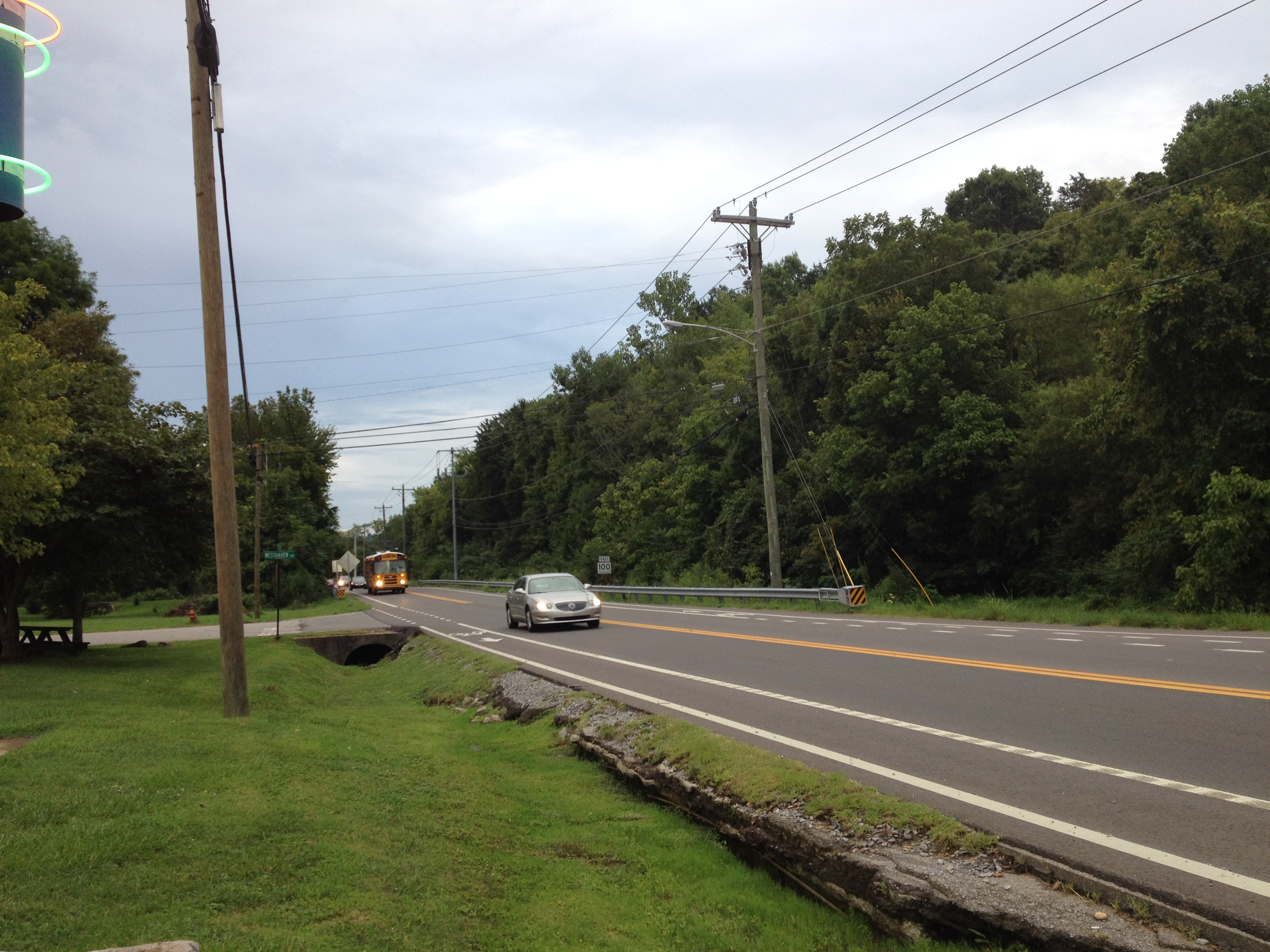
- Eastbound Tennessee State Route 100 past the intersection with McCrory Lane and the interchange with the northern terminus of the Natchez Trace Parkway Pasquo

- Location within Tennessee Location within the United States
- Coordinates: 36°02′04″N 86°58′26″W
- Country: United States
- State: Tennessee
- County: Davidson
- City: Nashville
- Time zone: UTC-6 (Central (CST))
  - Summer (DST): UTC-5 (CDT)
- Zip codes: 37221
- Area codes: 615, 629

Pasquo is a neighborhood of Nashville, along State Route 100 in Davidson County, within Bellevue. It is incorporated as part of the Metropolitan Government of Nashville and Davidson County.

Formerly a rural area, Pasquo has experienced rapid growth in recent years as the Nashville suburbs expand westward. As Pasquo is neither an incorporated municipality nor a census-designated place, its population is not measured or reported by the US Census. Pasquo is home to "Radio Free Nashville," the low-power FM radio radio station WRFN-LP. WRFN was the seventh community radio barnraising of the Prometheus Radio Project.

Pasquo is the short name for Pasquotank, and a now-defunct neighboring community was once known as Tank. The name was taken from Pasquotank County, North Carolina, where early settlers came from.

Pasquo is the location of the northern terminus of the Natchez Trace Parkway.
