= WRYR-LP =

Sherwood, Maryland; United States
- Broadcast area: Mid-Chesapeake Bay region
- Frequency: 97.5 MHz

Ownership
- Owner: WRYR Community Radio, Inc.

History
- First air date: 2002
- Last air date: October 2, 2019
- Call sign meaning: "We aRe Your Radio!"

Technical information
- Facility ID: 124341
- Class: L1
- ERP: 100 watts
- HAAT: 30.0 meters (98 feet)
- Transmitter coordinates: 38°45′59″N 76°19′40″W

WRYR-LP (97.5 FM) was a low-power radio station licensed to Sherwood, Maryland, United States. It served portions of Anne Arundel, Calvert, Queen Anne, Talbot, Dorchester, and Caroline Counties, including Maryland's capital city of Annapolis. The station was owned by WRYR Community Radio Inc. Its license was cancelled on October 2, 2019.

This station was a project of the South Arundel Citizens for Responsible Development (SACReD) as a creative means of reaching out to the Chesapeake Bay communities. As one of the first licensed Low-Power FM (LPFM) radio stations, WRYR-LP began broadcasting to the Mid-Chesapeake Bay region in the spring of 2002.

WRYR-LP was operated by a volunteer staff, using donated equipment, and funding contributed by businesses and individuals. The station focused on issues such as the environment and smart growth, local news, music and entertainment, health and lifestyle information, and other programming of interest to the eastern and western shore communities served by the station.

WRYR-LP was the first community radio barnraising of the Prometheus Radio Project.

On August 1, 2011, alternative rock station WHFS returned on 97.5 FM from a 1,000-foot tower on TV Hill in Baltimore. The 250-watt HFS signal reached well into the Crownsville area of Anne Arundel County. WRYR-LP's signal made it difficult to receive HFS South of Annapolis even though WRYR had been broadcasting mostly dead air since then.
