= David Pakman =

American political pundit (born 1984)

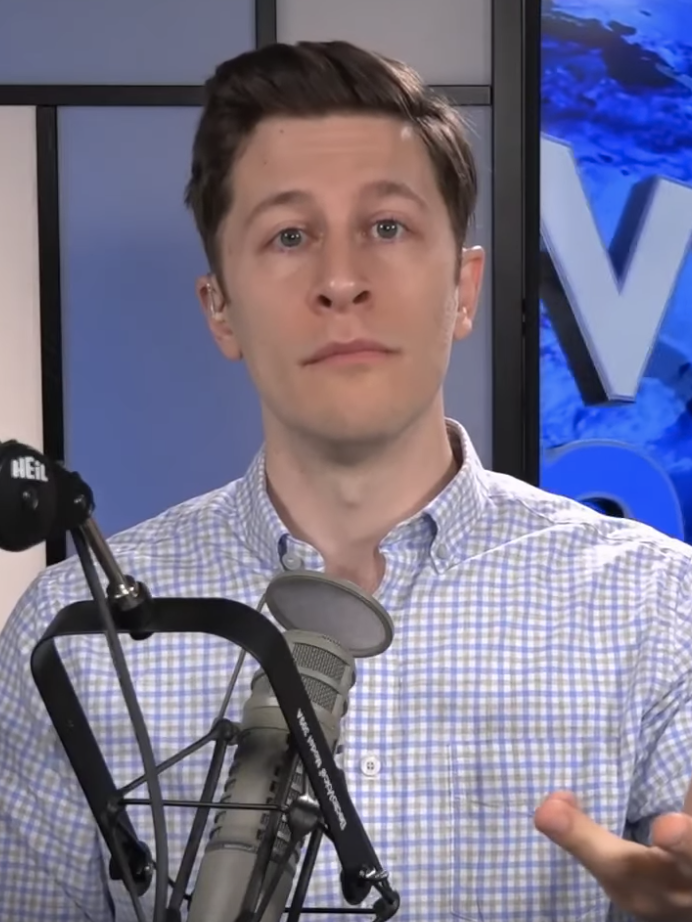
- Pakman in 2019
- Born: David Pakman; 2 February 1984 (age 42); Buenos Aires, Argentina
- Education: University of Massachusetts Amherst (BS); Bentley University (MBA)
- Occupations: Political media personality; media entrepreneur
- Years active: 2005–present

YouTube information
- Channel: The David Pakman Show
- Genres: News; political commentary
- Subscribers: 3.65 million
- Views: 3.71 billion
- Last updated: July 22, 2026
- Website: davidpakman.com

David Pakman (born 2 February 1984) is an Argentine-American political commentator, media entrepreneur, and author. He is the host and founder of The David Pakman Show, a progressive political news and commentary program distributed across radio, television, podcast platforms, and digital media, accumulating more than 3.4 million YouTube subscribers and 3.3 billion views. His work focuses on politics of the United States, democratic institutions, media ecosystems, and political extremism.

== Early life and education ==
David Pakman was born into an Argentine Jewish family in Buenos Aires, Argentina, and immigrated to the United States at the age of five. His father is a psychiatrist and his mother is a teacher. He has two siblings; a brother, and a sister. He grew up in Northampton, Massachusetts, and became a United States citizen at the age of sixteen.

Pakman is a graduate of Northampton High School. He is a graduate of the University of Massachusetts Amherst, where he studied economics and communications. In college he began hosting his first radio program on local station WXOJ-LP. He earned an MBA degree from Bentley University in Waltham, Massachusetts.

== Career ==
=== The David Pakman Show ===
The David Pakman Show launched in August 2005 as a local radio program on WXOJ-LP (Valley Free Radio) in Northampton, Massachusetts, entitled Midweek Politics with David Pakman. Pakman began the show at age 21 while still an undergraduate student.

=== Development and distribution ===
The program expanded into national syndication, at one point airing on more than 100 radio stations across the United States, and later broadened its distribution to national television via Free Speech TV on DirecTV and Dish Network, as well as podcast platforms and direct subscription channels. The show focuses on political commentary, news analysis, and interviews with politicians, journalists, intellectuals and public figures across the political spectrum, as well as media criticism and analysis of democratic institutions, disinformation systems and structural incentives shaping contemporary political media. The program subsequently expanded its distribution to television and digital platforms, where full episodes and clips are published online.

Episodes are also released online and made available as a podcast. The program has been carried on networks such as Free Speech TV and through radio syndication, in addition to its online distribution.

=== Media appearances and commentary ===
Pakman has appeared as a guest speaker and commentator on Fox News, CNN, and HLN, including Nancy Grace and Dr. Drew on Call. He has appeared twice on The Joe Rogan Experience, and on the Lex Fridman Podcast. He also appeared as a guest on Piers Morgan Uncensored, twice on Democracy Now, and PBD Podcast. In March 2026, California Governor Gavin Newsom appeared on The David Pakman Show to discuss Stephen Miller's role in the Trump administration. The interview drew a direct response from the White House Communications Director. His commentary has been cited or featured in Mother Jones, the Boston Herald, The New York Times, The Daily Beast, and Wired.

=== Writing and publications ===
Pakman is the author of several non-fiction books spanning children's literature and political commentary. His children's series include:

- Think Like a Detective: A Kid's Guide to Critical Thinking (2023)
- Think Like a Scientist: A Kid's Guide to Scientific Thinking (2023)
- Think Like a Voter: A Kid's Guide to Shaping Our Country's Future (2024)

In 2025, Pakman released his first adult nonfiction book; the New York Times Bestseller The Echo Machine: How Right-Wing Extremism Created A Post-Truth America published by Beacon Press. The book gave an examination of the role of media incentives, disinformation ecosystems, and the mechanisms driving radicalization in contemporary American politics.

In August 2025, a Wired article reported that Pakman was among several influencers included in communications about the Chorus Creator Incubator Program, a creator funding initiative funded by the Sixteen Thirty Fund—which Wired described as a "powerful liberal dark money group"—aimed at building "new infrastructure to fund independent progressive voices online at scale."

=== Recognition ===
The Reuters Institute for the Study of Journalism at the University of Oxford identified Pakman in its 2024 Digital News Report about prominent alternative political voices commanding significant audience attention on YouTube in the United States who built substantial independent audiences outside traditional broadcast infrastructure.

The Trump administration called David Pakman a "deranged leftist" "media offender" on the White House website. This sparked a debate about whether or not the government is attempting to pressure its critics.

== Books ==
Young readers

- Think Like a Detective: A Kid's Guide to Critical Thinking (2023)
- Think Like a Scientist: A Kid's Guide to Scientific Thinking (2023)
- Think Like a Voter: A Kid's Guide to Shaping Our Country's Future (2024)

Adults

- The Echo Machine: How Right-Wing Extremism Created a Post-Truth America (2025)
- Pay Attention: How the Algorithms and Media Wars Are Suppressing Truth and Rewiring Your Brain (2026)

== Personal life ==
Pakman has a life partner and two daughters. He has stated that he is secular and does not believe in God, but would not rule out the possibility.
