= Prometheus Radio Project =

- Type: non-profit
- Industry: low power community radio
- Founded: 1998
- Headquarters: Philadelphia, Pennsylvania
- Products: LPFM
- Website: Prometheus Radio Project

The Prometheus Radio Project is a non-profit advocacy and community organizing group with a mission to resist corporate media consolidation and radio homogenization in the United States. Founded in 1998 by a small group of radio activists in Philadelphia, Pennsylvania, Prometheus has participated in the community radio movement by providing technical training, helping marginalized communities gain access to affordable media outlets, and creating a network of low power community radio stations. A lot of Prometheus' efforts have over time been focused on legal advocacy for low-power FM (LPFM) stations.

It has EIN 23-3013087 as a 501(c)(3) Public Charity; in 2025 it claimed total revenue of $17,903 and total assets of $73,078.

== Origins ==
The Prometheus Radio Project emerged from Radio Mutiny, an unlicensed station located in West Philadelphia that broadcast during the mid-1990s. In 1998, the FCC shut down Radio Mutiny, prompting the station's organizers to hold a protest at Benjamin Franklin's printing press where they vowed to teach people to build ten more stations for everyone that was shut down. Subsequently, former pirate broadcasters involved with Radio Mutiny established the Prometheus Radio Project. The organization's mission was to advocate for new low-power FM licenses and assist community groups in establishing independent radio stations.

== Prometheus Radio Project v. FCC ==
In 2003 the Federal Communications Commission, under Chairman Michael Powell, sought to significantly relax media outlet ownership regulations. In Prometheus Radio Project v. FCC, a number of broadcasters and citizens groups, including the Consumer Federation of America, the National Council of Churches of Christ, and Media Alliance, sued to prevent the FCC from following through on the decision. Prometheus was represented by Andrew Jay Schwartzman and Cheryl Leanza of the Media Access Project. On September 3, 2003, the U.S. Third Circuit Court of Appeals issued a stay which prevented the new rules from being enforced pending the outcome of the litigation. In 2004, the majority ruled 2–1 in favor of Prometheus and mandated the FCC re-examine its media ownership rules. They ruled that a "diversity index" used by the FCC to weigh cross-ownership (of radio, television and newspapers) employed several "irrational assumptions and inconsistencies." Dissent by Chief Judge Anthony Joseph Scirica noted that the majority were simply employing their own assumptions.

The Supreme Court later turned down an appeal, so the decision stands. The FCC was ordered to reconfigure how it justifies raising ownership limits.

== Barnraisings ==
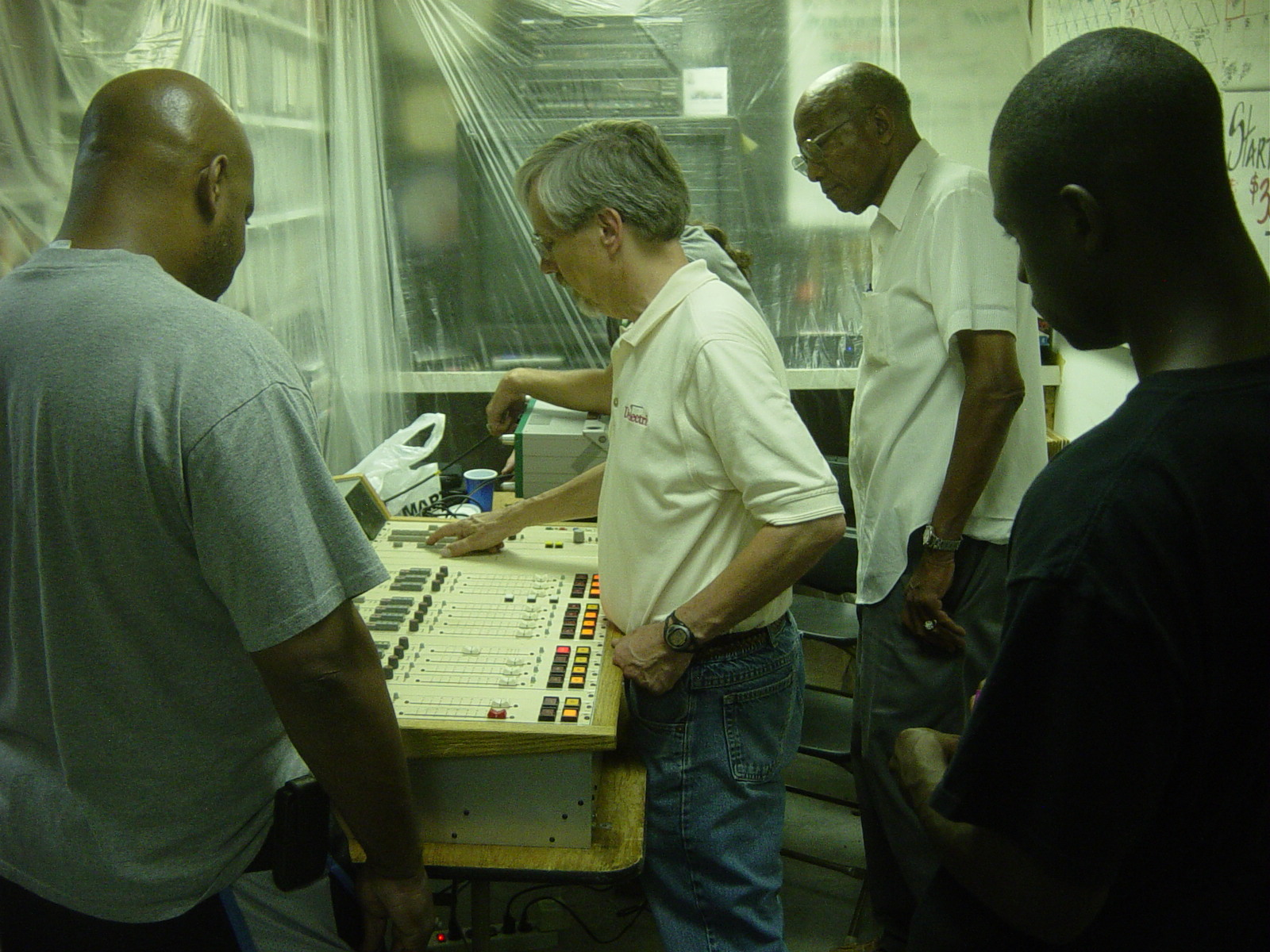
Studying the console at the WMXP-LP Barnraising, June 2007.

In the spirit of the Amish barn-raising tradition, where a community comes together and erects an essential structure, Prometheus holds radio barnraisings. These events bring together the local community with community radio advocates from around the world to build a community radio station, while advancing the movement for media democracy. Prometheus barnraisings gather Low Power FM radio advocates, journalists, radio engineers, students, lawyers, musicians, activists and other folks from across the country to build a studio, raise an antenna mast, and put the station on air for the first time – all over the course of three days. At a typical barnraising, the organization invites expert facilitators to lead workshops on a wide variety of topics, like understanding the workings of the FCC, introductions to various aspects of radio engineering, updates on media and democracy campaigns, and how radio can promote social change today. In the inclusive spirit of Prometheus's mission, the events are open to the public.

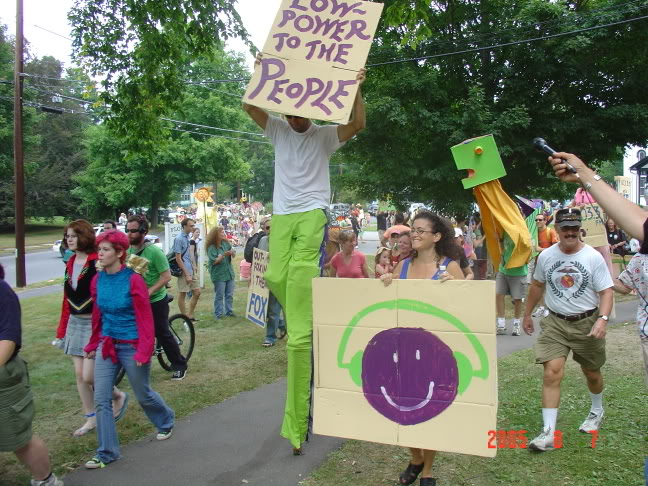
Parade at the end of the WXOJ-FM barnraising on August 7, 2005

Prometheus has held eleven community radio barnraisings to date:

- WRYR-LP – February 16–18, 2002 – Deale, Maryland with South Arundel Citizens for Responsible Development.
- KOYO-LP – April 12–14, 2002 – Oroville, California with the Bird Street Media Project (originally KRBS-LP).
- KOCZ-LP – November 15–17, 2002 – Opelousas, Louisiana with the Southern Development Foundation.
- KYRS-LP – October 24–26, 2003 – Spokane, Washington with Thin Air Community Radio (who later launched a full-power station KYRS).
- WCIW-LP – December 5–7, 2003 – Immokalee, Florida with the Coalition of Immokalee Workers.
- WSCA-LP – September 10–12, 2004 – Portsmouth, New Hampshire with Portsmith Community Radio.
- WRFN-LP – April 1–3, 2005 – Pasquo, Tennessee with Radio Free Nashville.
- WXOJ-LP – April 5–7, 2005 – Northampton, Massachusetts with Valley Free Radio.
- WRFU-LP – November 11–13, 2005 – Champaign-Urbana, Illinois with Radio Free Urbana.
- KPCN-LP – August 18–20, 2006 – Woodburn, Oregon with Pineros y Campesinos Unidos del Noroeste.
- WMXP-LP – June 8–10, 2007 – Greenville, South Carolina with the Malcolm X Grassroots Movement.
- WGXC-FM – September 24–26, 2010 – Hudson, New York with Free103point9.

Prometheus has also been active internationally, working with groups in Guatemala, Nepal, Colombia, Jordan, Kenya, and Tanzania.

== Prometheus Involvement with the Local Community Radio Act ==
For many years, Prometheus has strived to gain community members and nonprofit groups a fair share of the radio spectrum. Most recently, Prometheus was involved in the passing of the Local Radio Community Act. The act, proposed in 2009, opened up a portion of the radio spectrum to low-power community radio stations (LPFMs). Before then, community members could apply for licenses for full-power stations, which are five to ten times as expensive as LPFMs. Those groups who did not have the capital to build a full-power station were forced into piracy.

The Prometheus Radio Project did everything possible to ensure the passage of the Local Community Radio Act. Members of the organization discovered that while the bill circulated in Congress, secret holds were put on it to prevent its passage. People who opposed the bill, like Senator Gordon Smith – the president of the National Association of Broadcasters – were persuading other senators to vote against it. The moment the Prometheus Radio Project found out about this, members began contacting all the citizens they could. They encouraged their contacts to call their senators to show they were aware of these holds. Their efforts turned out to be successful when the Local Community Radio Act was finally passed in 2010.

What signing this act means is that “the FCC [has] a new mandate to expand low power radio,” says Brandy Doyle, Policy Director for the Prometheus Radio Project. However, the FCC will not begin to automatically hand out licenses. Doyle states that “we think the FCC will need to do a rulemaking to clarify the intent of the new law and update the rules going forward.” (Doyle) Because of this act, more groups will soon start to apply for licenses and they will need a lot of support in order to “navigate the process” says Vanessa Maria Graber, Community Radio Director at the Prometheus Radio Project. Now, however, “many low power stations are under a significant and substantive threat of encroachment.” Low Power FM Encroachment Report, 2/15/2005. Encroachment is something that Prometheus will have to work on combating next.

Prometheus, saw the act's passage as an opportunity to give a voice to local community radio and bring community radio to urban areas.

Prometheus' current Outreach Campaign involves the contacting and support of groups wishing to attain their own low-power FM community radio station.

== See also ==
- Prometheus Radio Project v. FCC
- LPFM
- Media ownership
- Media Access Project
- Community radio
- Media democracy
- World Association of Community Radio Broadcasters (AMARC)
- Telecommunications Act of 1996
- National Association of Broadcasters
- Citizen media
