= Radio homogenization =

Homogenization and consolidation of local radio stations

Radio homogenization is the shift in which previously locally programmed and hosted radio stations increasingly air remotely pre-recorded program material and central-cast via Internet or satellite.

== Background of corporate consolidation in the United States ==
=== Deregulation ===
The 1996 Telecommunications Act removed all national and local restrictions on national ownership that specified the number of stations one company could own in a set market. Before 1996, a company was prohibited from owning more than 40 stations, and from owning more than two AM and two FM stations in one market. The bill covered a wide range of formats and was the first time the Internet was included in broadcasting and spectrum allotment.

The federal government has regulated the extent of ownership for radio stations since the 1934 Communications Act. The policy was based on the notion that the airwaves were accessible to the public and therefore had an accompanying public trust. However, the U.S. Federal Communications Commission (FCC) began to relax these limitations.

Lydia Polgreen's research indicates that the 1996 Telecommunications Act was one of the most lobbied bills in history. Media interests spent $34 million on campaign contributions for the 1995–96 election cycle – nearly 40% more than the previous election. Martin Scherzinger claims the public was mostly uninformed of potential consequences, as "the media covered the Telecommunications Act as a business technicality instead of a public policy story," assuring deregulation would increase competition and generate high-paying jobs. There was no discernible public debate.

Since deregulation in 1996, more than a third of all US radio stations have been bought and sold. Polgreen indicates that in the year following the legislation alone, 2045 radio stations were sold – a net value of $13.6 billion. Of the 4,992 total stations across 268 set radio markets, almost half are now owned by a company owning three or more stations in the same market. The Future of Music Coalition reported the number of stations owned by the ten largest companies increased by roughly fifteen times between 1985 and 2005. Robert F. X. Sillerman, Chairman of SFX Broadcasting, noted that consolidation also helps spread overhead costs around, and even adding a second station can cut costs. Consolidation doesn't necessarily mean less stations, merely less owners.

=== Clear Channel ===
Two companies in particular, Clear Channel and the Infinity Broadcasting unit of Viacom, own roughly half the USA's airwaves. Clear Channel grew from 40 stations to 1,240 stations in seven years (30 times more than congressional regulation previously allowed) . Their aggressive acquisitions have gained them enemies as well as supporters, but their ownership of 247 of the nation's 250 largest radio markets and their domination of the Top 40 format makes them undeniably a significant player in the music industry.

After 42 years, the country's largest radio broadcaster switched its name to iHeartRadio Inc. Though most of their revenue still comes from advertising on its airwaves, iHeartRadio only accounts for 10% of total listening for the company. Clear Channel has built the iHeartRadio brand beyond the Internet (see: iHeartRadio Festival, Jingle Ball, Pool Party, iHeartRadio Music Awards). After the company's concert promotion division spun off in 2005, it ditched the Clear Channel name in favor of Live Nation. This follows a general trend of Consolidation of Media Ownership, where corporate interests take precedence over the artistic integrity of the content. An analysis of a wide range of music professionals by Frontline illustrates this is especially true of the music industry.

=== Recorded music ===
According to Martin Scherzinger, "recorded music is the most concentrated global media market today." When he wrote this in 2005, six leading firms – PolyGram, EMI, Warner Music Group (at the time, a unit of AOL Time Warner), Sony Music Entertainment, BMG (at the time, a unit of Bertelsmann), and Universal Music Group (at the time, a unit of Vivendi, before becoming public in 2021) – were estimated to control between 80% and 90% of the global market. As of April 2025, the industry has consolidated even further. A series of mergers has reduced the big six to just three large corporations: Universal Music Group (which purchased EMI's recorded music operations, and has merged with Polygram), Sony Music Entertainment (which merged EMI publishing into Sony/ATV Music Publishing, and purchased BMG in 2008), and Warner Music Group (which absorbed EMI's Parlophone and EMI/Virgin Classic labels). Most of these companies are part of larger conglomerates. Vertical concentration and horizontal integration allow cross pollination to promote products across multiple mediums. For instance, Sony owns film and television studios, cable channels, retail stores, video game developers, etc., and can thus promote one through the utilization of another.

== Effects ==
=== Programming ===
Scherzinger states that cross-ownership tends to reduce competition, lower risk, and increase profits. He argues this "has forced musical production to succumb to the advertising, marketing, styling, and engineering techniques of increasingly uniform and narrow profit-driven criteria." In the name of efficiency, new technology has allowed a station's technician to cut and paste news, weather and host chatter into pre-recorded programming. Companies have greatly benefited from Top 40, national news, and sports programming shows that can be purchased at the national level. News programming in particular is often produced and recorded at a remote location, as the practice streamlines the number of personalities needed on the air, and emulates a similar feel for the listener. This process of regionalized programming is referred to as voice tracking. For radio broadcasters, the more homogeneity between different services held in common ownership (or the more elements within a program schedule which can be shared between 'different' stations), the greater the opportunity to gain profits.

This increase of cost-efficiency, an application of economies of scale, also results in cutting staff and centralizing programming decisions on what should be broadcast. The music-loving DJ playing whatever they feel fits the mood is largely fictional at any major station at this point in time. Billboard Magazine reported that the mainstream press has accused several large radio conglomerates of playing less new music since the Telecommunications Act of 1996. Consolidation has made it even less likely that one will hear something new, different, or unique.

=== Musical diversity ===
The number of formats provided by radio stations increased in all markets between 1996 and 2000. However, an in-depth case study from the Future of Music Coalition shows that a quantitative focus on formats obscures their interconnections. Despite different names, formats extensively overlap and have similar playlists. For example, alternative, Top 40, rock, and hot adult contemporary are all likely to play songs by similar bands, even though their formats are not the same. The Future of Music Coalition reports an analysis of charts in Radio and Records and Billboard's Airplay Monitor revealed considerable playlist overlap – as much as 76% – between supposedly distinct formats. This overlap may enhance the homogenization of the airwaves.

FMC's study concludes that allowing unlimited national consolidation has resulted in less competition, fewer viewpoints, and a decrease in diversity in radio programming – a trend in the opposite direction of Congress's stated goals for the FCC's media policy. The report, titled False Premises, False Promises: A Quantitative History of Ownership Consolidation in the Radio Industry, also says that radio consolidation has no added benefits for DJ's, programmers and musicians working in the music industry.

Polgreen says that for listeners, the most readily apparent result of consolidation is the rise of cookie-cutter playlists. Teams of market researchers strategically compile playlists to be as widely appealing as possible rather than base the song choices on merit. For example, on an oldies show, probably the most heavily researched and systematized format in radio, classic hits will be played almost every day, while critically acclaimed songs by the same bands get little or no play. What one hears has been carefully crafted to appeal to targeted demographic groups for that station. Indeed, format competition and subsequent adaption of similar formats has become a major facet of modern radio.

As companies seek to extend their demographic reach, they tend to promote music with "general" appeal. While the general appeal may seem relatively neutral at first glance, Scherzinger juxtaposes a best-case scenario (tunes that are genuinely popular) with a worst-case scenario (bland content). Music under these conditions is subject to highly restrictive aesthetic codes and cultural judgments of those in positions of authority. He asserts that music with standardized ingredients is played on stations whose ownership is the most consolidated. Scherzinger continues, that "far from reflecting a neutral and general taste in music, this stabilized aesthetic tends to mediate the tastes of a highly particular demographic, namely, the social sector with disposable income: predominantly white, middle-class, heterosexual, 18-to-45-year-old males."

When economic criteria drive programming decisions, it follows that radio play, media coverage, and sales will be directed toward the most lucrative demographics. Trade publication Variety observed, "A huge wave of consolidation has turned music stations into cash cows that focus on narrow playlists aimed at squeezing the most revenue from the richest demographics... Truth be told, in this era of megamergers, there has never been a greater need for a little diversity on the dial."

In a recent survey of how much new music is added to Top 40 stations each week, Billboard/Airplay Monitor discovered that smaller groups and individually owned stations add and play more new songs each week. But there are also some prominent exceptions and a wide variance within certain groups. In general, the trend is towards more conservative, less aggressive releases of new material.

=== National advertising model ===
Radio tends to get a majority of their revenue from advertising. Polgreen claims that from the 1996 Telecom Act, commercial radio broadcasters sought to form national media companies that could transition radio to a national advertising model. Media companies could then pitch their stations to both local and national advertisers. A company with multiple stations now allows marketing firms to approach the parent company, who can then provide them with the desired target audience through a specific station and time slot.

Expanded to a national level, this advertising model generates many more leads for marketers at a fraction of the time and energy that going to individual stations previously required. A study on the impact of ownership rules following the 1996 Telecom Act found that the biggest area of change following the first few years of unrestrained consolidation was the negotiation of advertising rates. Indeed, revenue more than doubled in a decade, from $8.4 billion in 1990 to more than $17 billion by 2000.

Scherzinger argues that marketing branches of music companies no longer are purely administrative. Instead, he contends that "through intricate applications of management theory – supervising and measuring data – marketers settle priorities, make aesthetic judgments, and select musical forms." Marketers are increasingly who decide what music gets attention.

Radio has historically had to balance listeners' desires with the need to deliver a predictable audience to advertisers. In the past, if listeners thought a song was too monotonous or repetitive, they could tune to a different station. Now, however, there is less choice available, and that song might be playing on a nearby station. The radio spectrum is a limited and publicly owned commodity. Since there is a definite amount of space on the radio spectrum, big companies have an incentive to dominate as much of it as they can.

=== Declining local ownership ===
Concentration of corporate ownership in the vast majority of local markets, at the expense of local ownership, has increased dramatically. The Local Ownership Index, created by Future of Music Coalition, shows that the localness of radio ownership has declined from an average of 97.1% to an average of 69.9%, a 28% drop. Polgreen asserts that the buying frenzy following the Telecom Act drove up station prices beyond the reach of the typical entrepreneur, making it difficult for smaller station owners to resist the financial pressures to sell. As a result, only dedicated local owners have survived.

== Alternatives ==
Concentration of radio ownership translates to concentration of radio listenership. According to the FMC, the top four firms received 48% of the listeners in 2005. Yet across 155 markets, radio listenership has declined over the past fourteen years that data is available for, a 22% drop since its peak in 1989. It is plausible that the decline in radio listenership is due to consumers finding alternatives more attractive than homogenized radio.

=== Satellite radio ===
The two competing satellite radio services, Sirius and XM, merged to form Sirius XM Radio in 2009 and now has a government-regulated monopoly on the format. The merger combined more than 18.5 million subscribers for both companies based on their existing subscribers on the date they merged.

=== Low-power FM stations ===
One of these alternative formats, LPFMs (low-power FM stations) is a promising alternative to nationalized radio stations. By broadcasting at well under 100 watts (the minimum for commercial stations is set at 100 watts), these independently run stations have been viewed as a possible antidote to radio consolidation, as they are local stations dealing with local issues. The Federal Communications Commission seems to be sympathetic to single station owners, and its former chairman, William Kennard, has taken steps to encourage further diversity in ownership by proposing the creation of three new classes of licenses for LPFMs.

=== Other media ===
Other less homogenized formats can be found through individual libraries, as well as internet radio formats like podcasts. Other streaming services like Pandora and Spotify are becoming increasingly popular. However, a 2014 Nielsen report indicates that radio still remains the most popular platform for music consumption, as 59% of listeners use a combination of AM/FM or online radio streams to hear their favorite artists.

== Paradigm shift ==
Artists that experienced success in the industry prior to the 1996 Telecommunications Act, such as David Crosby of Crosby, Stills, Nash & Young and Don Henley of The Eagles, have brought to light what they believe are contributing to the nationwide homogenization of music. Crosby tells PBS in an interview, "When it all started, record companies – and there were many of them, and this was a good thing – were run by people who loved records, people like Ahmet Ertegun, who ran Atlantic Records, who were record collectors. They got in it because they loved music.... Now record companies are run by lawyers and accountants." This view highlights a common theme that creativity and passion have been subverted by the financial incentives of corporatized media companies. Chief executives of large record labels often have no musical or cultural background. A head of Universal Vivendi, Jean René Fourtou, was previously in pharmaceuticals. Gunter Thielen, the former head of Bertelsmann, previously managed the company's printing and industrial operations.

Music journalist Ernesto Aguilar expressed the sentiment that "media consolidation means not only does corporate radio control who gets played, but also which artists get recognition, who is perceived as a voice in a music's history and who is erased from that history."

== See also ==
- Audience measurement
- Concentration of media ownership
- Fahrenheit 451
- Future of Music Coalition
- National Public Radio
- Prometheus Radio Project
- iHeartMedia
- Channel drift, in television
