= KVFS-LP =

- Spokane, Washington; United States
- Frequency: 100.3 MHz
- Branding: Voices for Spokane

Programming
- Format: Variety

Ownership
- Owner: Spokane Translator Association

History
- First air date: October 26, 2003
- Former call signs: KYRS-LP (2003–2011)
- Former frequencies: 95.3 MHz (2004–2007); 89.9 MHz (2007–2022)
- Call sign meaning: Voices For Spokane

Technical information
- Licensing authority: FCC
- Class: L1
- ERP: 100 watts
- HAAT: 30 meters (98 ft)
- Transmitter coordinates: 47°31′58.00″N 117°26′20.00″W

Links
- Public license information: LMS

KVFS-LP (100.3 FM) is a low-powered radio station in Spokane, Washington.

Originally launched as KYRS-LP, the station was the fourth community radio barnraising of the Prometheus Radio Project, with original owner Thin Air Community Radio. Thin Air Community Radio sold KYRS-LP to new owners as a condition of being issued a license for full-power station KYRS.
