= Abby Snow Belden =

American physical educator

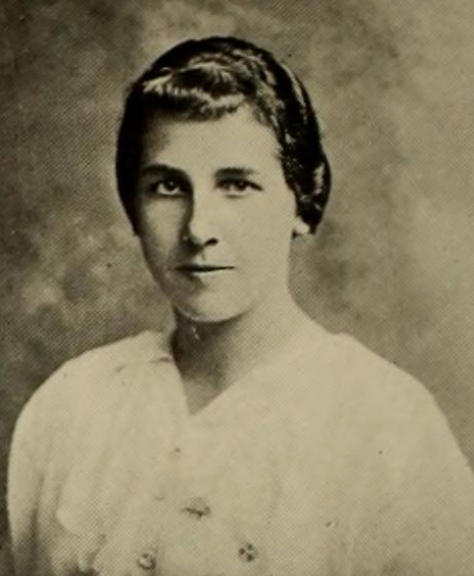
- Abby Snow Belden, from the 1918 yearbook of Smith College
- Born: August 2, 1896; Hatfield, Massachusetts
- Died: April 18, 1969 (aged 72); Center Harbor, New Hampshire
- Other names: Abbie Snow Belden
- Occupation(s): Physical education professor, camp director

Abby Snow Belden (August 2, 1896 – April 18, 1969) was an American physical educator, on the faculty at Smith College. She was an accomplished horsewoman and active in hiking, camping, and other outdoors activities in New England.

== Early life and education ==
Belden was born in Hatfield, Massachusetts, the daughter of Clarence Eugene Belden and Nellie Maud Snow Belden. She was a teenaged horse racer in Northampton, Massachusetts. She graduated from Northampton High School in 1914, and from Smith College in 1918. She earned a teaching certificate in hygiene from Wellesley College in 1920.

== Career ==
Belden taught physical education at the University High School at the University of Chicago from 1920 to 1921. In 1925, she was promoted to full professor status in the department of hygiene and physical education at Smith College. She was faculty director of the Outing Club at Smith. In 1930, she organized a "foxless fox hunt" for the club.

Belden directed Camp Tahoma Junior in Pike, New Hampshire, until 1927. She founded and directed Camp Winnicut at Lake Winnipesaukee. She also taught riding at a nearby boys' camp, Camp Tecumseh. She was a founding member of the Sportswoman Guild, and a member of the American Physical Education Association, and the Appalachian Mountain Club. She spoke at the New England Trail Conference in 1927, on training her pet collie to pull a "light toboggan" while camping in winter. She served on the steering committee of the New England Trail Conference.

Belden ran for a seat on the Northampton City Council in 1929. In 1942, she joined the staff of Marot Junior College. She held a seat on the school board in Moultonborough, New Hampshire in 1946, and was a town trustee in the early 1960s.

== Personal life ==
Belden died in 1969, aged 72 years, at a nursing home in Center Harbor, New Hampshire.
