= WFSK-FM =

Coordinates: 36.16672°N 86.80472°W

Nashville, Tennessee; United States
- Broadcast area: Nashville, Tennessee
- Frequency: 88.1 MHz
- Branding: Jazzy 88

Programming
- Format: Smooth & Contemporary Jazz
- Affiliations: American Urban Radio Networks

Ownership
- Owner: Fisk University

History
- First air date: 1973; 53 years ago
- Former call signs: WRFN (c. 1973–1983)
- Call sign meaning: FiSK University

Technical information
- Licensing authority: FCC
- Facility ID: 21666
- Class: A
- ERP: 700 watts
- HAAT: 2 meters

Links
- Public license information: Public file; LMS
- Webcast: Listen Live
- Website: wfskfm.org

WFSK-FM (88.1 MHz) is a non-profit radio station in Nashville, Tennessee. Owned and operated by Fisk University, it broadcasts a smooth & contemporary jazz format under the branding "JAZZY 88 Nashville's Jazz Station," WFSK is the first radio station in Nashville to play jazz music on the radio. The station's studios are located inside Dubois Hall and its transmitter are located nearby—both on campus.

Unlike some other stations operated by historically black colleges and universities (HBCUs) in the present, WFSK has no affiliation with the public radio system (e.g., NPR) and operates independently.

Sharon Kay is the general manager of WFSK; Xuam Lawson is the program director.

== History ==
The station began from a Fisk student initiative in 1969 to supplement commercial stations that served black listeners in Nashville. Its original callsign was WRFN-FM (now used by an unrelated community-licensed station in Nashville), and started operations sometime in 1973, indicated by University and station records. According to the Federal Communications Commission, the station was first issued a license on January 15, 1974, some months after what were probably test broadcasts were first conducted. Its current license dates to May 26, 1983, when the present WFSK callsign was adopted.

== See also ==
- List of Nashville media
