= WXOJ-LP =

- Northampton, Massachusetts; United States
- Broadcast area: Pioneer Valley
- Frequency: 103.3 MHz
- Branding: Valley Free Radio

Programming
- Format: Community radio
- Affiliations: Pacifica Radio

Ownership
- Owner: Valley Free Radio Inc.

History
- First air date: August 7, 2008

Technical information
- Licensing authority: FCC
- Facility ID: 133520
- Class: L1
- ERP: 100 watts
- HAAT: 20.3 meters (67 feet)
- Transmitter coordinates: 42°18′59″N 72°40′20″W

Links
- Public license information: LMS
- Website: valleyfreeradio.org

WXOJ-LP (103.3 FM, "Valley Free Radio") is a non-profit, independent community radio station licensed to serve Northampton, Massachusetts, as well as the central Pioneer Valley region. The station was first licensed to Foundation For Media Education Inc. until April 2010 when it was transferred to Valley Free Radio, inc.. WXOJ is the original broadcast station of the nationally syndicated radio and television program The David Pakman Show (originally Midweek Politics with David Pakman). The station also hosts locally produced programming at its main studios in the village of Florence, as an affiliate, VFR airs other local and national content from the Pacifica Radio Network.

Valley Free Radio is volunteer-run and provides training in live programming, broadcast equipment technology, and digital audio production and editing to its members, as well as studio space for DJs and programmers. In addition, it houses the David S Dow Recording Studio; a secondary recording studio for pre-recorded content to be made.

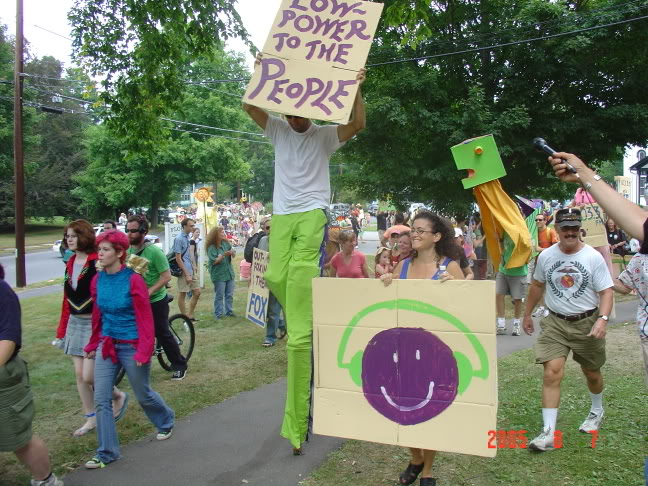
Parade at the end of the Prometheus Radio Project barnraising on August 7, 2005

The station was assigned the "WXOJ-LP" call letters by the Federal Communications Commission on May 11, 2004. The station was launched with assistance from the Philadelphia-based Prometheus Radio Project.

== See also ==
- List of community radio stations in the United States
