= The David Pakman Show =

American progressive news talk show

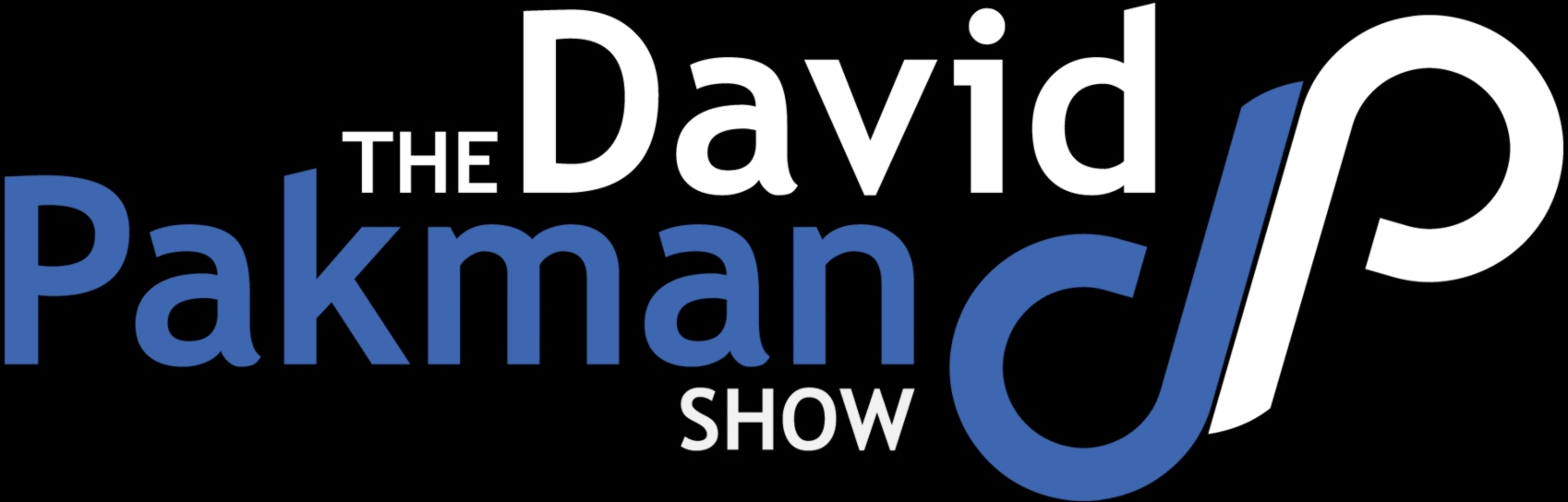
- Created by: David Pakman
- Presented by: David Pakman (host); Luke Beasley (guest host)
- Country of origin: United States
- Original language: English

Production
- Executive producer: David Pakman
- Producer: Pat Ford
- Production location: New York City
- Running time: Podcast: 1 hour; Online: 1 hour (+15min Bonus Show for subscribed members)

Original release
- Network: Pacifica Radio (2006–2024)
- Release: August 17, 2005 – June 13, 2024
- Network: YouTube (2009–present); Ustream (2009–2013); Free Speech TV (2010–present); Amazon Prime (2016–present)
- Release: September 5, 2009 – present

The David Pakman Show (TDPS), originally Midweek Politics with David Pakman, is a progressive news talk show currently airing on television, radio, and the Internet, hosted by David Pakman.

The program first aired in August 2005 on WXOJ-LP, a radio station located in Northampton, Massachusetts, later being nationally syndicated, and eventually achieving broader international distribution in a number of countries, as well as online.

The show is made up of both live and pre-recorded interviews, clips from television and radio programs related to politics and current events, segments with correspondents on the street and in public, and other specially produced segments. It focuses on modern North American politics and society, with frequent discussion of economics, science, religion in public life, culture, LGBT rights, capital punishment and crime, policing, the Israeli–Palestinian conflict, North American foreign policy, technology, and other topical issues. The show has drawn criticism for interviewing fringe personalities and has been accused of platforming them. Pakman has responded that these interviews expose their opinions to the public, putting them on record, and that he does not simply give them a "platform" to express their views without balance.

== History ==
=== As Midweek Politics with David Pakman ===
Pakman started the radio version of the program at age 21 on Pacifica radio affiliate WXOJ while an undergraduate student at the University of Massachusetts Amherst, during his time as an intern at the Media Education Foundation. Public radio syndication began in 2006 on the Pacifica Radio Network. Initially, a handful of non-commercial talk radio stations broadcast the show in syndication.

The show expanded in 2007 to more public radio stations. Pakman was for a time the youngest syndicated radio host in the United States. The same year, Louis Motamedi, a childhood friend of Pakman's, was added as radio producer.

In 2009, The David Pakman Show added its first commercial radio affiliates, starting with Green 1640 in Atlanta, Georgia and WHMP Northampton, Massachusetts. On September 2, Midweek Politics, a simultaneously-produced television show, was launched, originally offered to public-access television stations across the country as well as published on the show's YouTube Channel. The number of television affiliates grew and Pakman attributed this to expanding from radio to a visual medium. Pakman's brother, Natan Pakman, became the program's television director in September 2009.

=== As The David Pakman Show ===
In 2010, the show launched a paid membership program maintaining the podcast at no charge, but offering subscribers extra show segments, behind-the-scenes interviews, and access to show archives. In July of that year, the show obtained national television distribution through Free Speech TV. The show's first international affiliate, Öppna Kanalen Skövde in Skövde, Sweden, announced in September 2010 that it would be airing the program. At the same time, the show was moved from WXOJ to its own studio in Northampton, Massachusetts, for both the radio and television versions. The name was then changed to The David Pakman Show, expanding from a weekly program to two episodes per week, broadcast live on Mondays and Thursdays at 3 pm Eastern Standard Time.

Shortly after a broadcast on April 28, 2010, visitors to the show's website began to observe that the site was not functioning properly, and sometimes was inaccessible altogether. Denial-of-service attacks continued, eventually taking the site offline for two days. On the May 12, 2010, broadcast, Pakman announced that the website had indeed been in the target of unknown deliberate malicious attacks starting immediately after the April 28, 2010, broadcast. Pakman did not indicate the specifics of who was suspected to be involved, but said a more detailed investigation was underway, and alluded to a connection between a guest on the program between April 28 and May 12.

In March 2012, the show announced an expansion to four episodes per week, Monday-Thursday, and a move to an earlier live broadcast time, 2pm EST. The same year, the show joined The Young Turks network, although it has since left the network.

== Content ==
The David Pakman Show is a progressive talk radio program.

Pakman is a strong supporter of same-sex marriage, a topic which has often provoked conflict with guests on the program. Pakman has regularly indicated that the more outrageous, extreme guests are not only interesting to interview, but create the most interest and engagement on behalf of the audience, and that he often interviews people who "would be classified as 'extremists.'"

=== Glenn Miller ===
In April 2010, white supremacist Glenn Miller appeared on Midweek Politics. During the interview, Miller espoused a number of anti-Semitic conspiracy theories and openly insulted Pakman using antisemitic slur. Miller also stated that Adolf Hitler was a "great man" and expressed disappointment that Hitler had not ultimately succeeded in the Holocaust. Snippets of the interview spread throughout the internet, garnering varied reactions. On the following program, Pakman responded to the controversy.

On April 13, 2014, Miller was arrested as the prime suspect in the Overland Park Jewish Community Center shooting. This arrest led to a frenzy of media interest, with Pakman and the original interview featured on CNN, The Huffington Post, The Boston Herald, Mother Jones, Raw Story, Democracy Now, WGGB-TV, and Minneapolis radio station AM950. Miller was later found guilty of capital murder, and was sentenced to death by lethal injection.

=== Paul Cameron ===
During an interview with Paul Cameron, the anti-gay psychologist and sex researcher, Cameron cited a study conducted by his Family Research Institute which reported that gays and lesbians in the military are far more likely to rape or sexually abuse fellow soldiers.

=== Westboro Baptist Church live hack ===
Members of the Westboro Baptist Church have been interviewed many times on the show, including one incident in which Jake Davis, then only known as "Topiary", announced a live hacking attack on the church's website during a group interview with church spokesperson Shirley Phelps-Roper.

=== Chaplain Gordon Klingenschmitt ===
Former Navy Chaplain Gordon Klingenschmitt, who has expressed anti-gay positions, has appeared on The David Pakman Show. He was honorably but involuntarily discharged from the Navy after a court-martial proceeding for refusing an order not to appear in uniform at political events to "pray in Jesus' name". During a notable appearance, Klingenschmitt debated Jonathan Phelps, of the anti-gay Westboro Baptist Church. The interview drew media coverage due to the fact that both men held anti-gay positions, but disagreed on the reasons why being homosexual was wrong. Klingenschmitt is also known for his efforts to shut down the YouTube channel of one of his most vocal critics, Right Wing Watch, which uses video clips of his statements.

=== Gamergate ===
Starting in October 2014, Pakman conducted a series of interviews with people involved in Gamergate. People interviewed included game commentator John "TotalBiscuit" Bain, then-8chan owner Fredrick Brennan and game developer Brianna Wu, among others.

== Reception ==
Arthur Chu has criticized Pakman, arguing that Pakman indulges in sensationalistic "clickbaiting" and platforms people who otherwise would not have one.

The David Pakman Show YouTube channel has been covered in reporting on the YouTube demonetization crisis, known colloquially as the "Adpocalypse".
