= Local Community Radio Act =

Broadcast radio law in the United States

Local Community Radio Act of 2010
- Long title: An Act To implement the recommendations of the Federal Communications Commission report to the Congress regarding low-power FM service, and for other purposes.
- Enacted by: the 111th United States Congress

The Local Community Radio Act is an act of broadcast law in the United States, explicitly authorizing the Federal Communications Commission (FCC) to license local low-power broadcasting in the FM broadcast band (LPFM). After five years and four versions, it passed the U.S. Congress in 2010, granting equal protection to community radio stations with regard to translator and booster stations. All three types of stations remain secondary to full-power radio stations, which are typically owned by major corporations and nonprofits. (Previously, this second-class status was only a part of FCC regulation, rather than law.) The act negates the Radio Broadcasting Preservation Act of 2000, which prevented community LPFM stations on the basis of RF interference.

== Versions ==
=== Local Community Radio Act of 2005 ===
- Introduced by U.S. Senators John McCain, Maria Cantwell, Patrick Leahy
- After the FCC complied with the provisions of the Radio Broadcasting Act of 2000 by commissioning the MITRE Report to test if there was significant interference from LPFM stations on the full-power stations, the study showed that the interference of LPFM is minimal and won't have a significant effect on other stations.
- According to Sen. Leahy, "This bill will open up the airwaves to truly local broadcasting while protecting full-power broadcasters from unreasonable interference and preserving important services such as reading services for the blind."

=== Local Community Radio Act of 2007 ===
Sponsored in the U.S. House of Representatives by Congressmen Mike Doyle and Lee Terry and in the U.S. Senate by Senators Maria Cantwell and John McCain the Local Community Radio Act of 2007 failed to be voted on. The House bill, H.R. 2802, was referred to the Subcommittee on Telecommunications and the Internet on June 21, 2007. Other than that nothing has come to the observation till now. Since the bill was not passed in FY 2007, the bill was removed from the docket as Never Passed.

=== Local Community Radio Act of 2009 ===
This bill was an update of the Local Community Radio Act of 2007. It required FCC to alter current rules in order to eliminate the minimum distance separation between low-power FM stations and third-adjacent-channel stations. Previously, there had been a minimum distance requirement, however the FCC found that LPFM stations did not cause any interference on third-adjacent channel stations, thus eliminating the need for such a requirement.

The Local Community Radio Act of 2009 also required that the FCC keep the rules that offer interference protection to third-adjacent channels that offer a radio reading service (the reading of newspapers, books or magazines for those who are blind or hearing impaired.) This protection was to ensure that such channels are not subject to possible interference by LPFM stations.

The final part of the bill required that when giving out licenses to FM stations, the FCC must make licenses available to LPFM stations and that licensing decisions be made with regard to local community needs.

The bill had unanimous bipartisan support from FCC leadership. It was passed by the House and referred to the Senate.

=== Local Community Radio Act of 2010 ===
The Local Community Radio Act of 2010 (based upon legislation originally introduced in 2005) was signed into law by President Barack Obama on January 4, 2011 as Pub. L. 111–371 (text) (PDF), after passage in the House on December 17, 2010, and the U.S. Senate on December 18, 2010. In a statement after the bill became law, Federal Communications Commission Chair Julius Genachowski said, "Low power FM stations are small, but they make a giant contribution to local community programming. This important law eliminates the unnecessary restrictions that kept these local stations off the air in cities and towns across the country." The Act states the following: The Federal Communications Commission, when licensing new FM translator stations, FM booster stations, and low-power FM stations, shall ensure that-- (1) licenses are available to FM translator stations, FM booster stations, and low-power FM stations; (2) such decisions are made based on the needs of the local community; and (3) FM translator stations, FM booster stations, and low-power FM stations remain equal in status and secondary to existing and modified full-service FM stations. In General- The Federal Communications Commission shall modify its rules to eliminate third-adjacent minimum distance separation requirements between-- (1) low-power FM stations; and (2) full-service FM stations, FM translator stations, and FM booster stations.

== Rulemaking ==
In July 2011, the FCC issued a notice of proposed rulemaking in response to the law. It proposes to put a "floor" on the number of community LPFM stations in each media market, without considering the land area which the market covers. This could be detrimental for community stations in markets with a lower population density and could result in LPFM stations being pushed into the exurbs, where more channels are available, but far fewer potential listeners live within a small broadcast range.

A March 19, 2012, FTC ruling appears to address the concern that major corporations using "translator" stations as LPFMs, originating programming that could otherwise only have been heard on AM or on a proprietary digital radio system called HD Radio. This use, disallowed by the FCC, could have circumvented caps intended to prevent excessive concentration of media ownership, and violates the noncommercial, localism, power, and height rules that other community LPFM stations must abide by.
