= Prometheus Radio Project v. FCC =

2021 United States Supreme Court case

- Supreme Court of the United States

Argued January 19, 2021 Decided April 1, 2021
- Full case name: Federal Communications Commission v. Prometheus Radio Project
- Citations: 592 U.S. 414 (more) 141 S.Ct. 1150

Case history
- Prior: 939 F. 3d 567 (2019), 824 F. 3d 33 (2016), 652 F. 3d 431 (2011), 545 U.S. 1123 (2005), 373 F.3d 372 (2004)

Holding
- Spectrum allocation decisions made by the Federal Communications Commission must be reasonable and supported by sufficient evidence per the requirements of the Administrative Procedure Act.

Court membership
- Chief Justice John Roberts Associate Justices Clarence Thomas · Stephen Breyer; Samuel Alito · Sonia Sotomayor; Elena Kagan · Neil Gorsuch; Brett Kavanaugh · Amy Coney Barrett

Case opinions
- Majority: Kavanaugh, joined by unanimous
- Concurrence: Thomas

Laws applied
- Communications Act of 1934

Prometheus Radio Project v. FCC, 592 US 414 (2021), is the general title of a series of cases heard by the U.S. Court of Appeals for the Third Circuit from 2003 to 2019 and finalized by the U.S. Supreme Court in 2021. A media activist group, Prometheus Radio Project, challenged new media ownership rules put forth by the Federal Communications Commission (FCC) in 2002. In the first court challenge in 2004, the Third Circuit overruled an attempt by the FCC to raise the limits of media ownership within markets and relax cross-ownership (radio, television, and newspaper) prohibitions, and determined that a diversity index used by the FCC had been formulated inconsistently.

The Circuit Court enjoined the FCC from enacting its new rules and ordered the Commission to reconsider how it justifies raising ownership limits. The Commission appealed this ruling to the U.S. Supreme Court, but the appeal request was rejected. The FCC then endeavored to adjust its rules as ordered by the Third Circuit. That court revisited the case in 2011 and ruled that changes had been made satisfactorily, and the injunction against enacting the media ownership rules was lifted. Further changes to FCC media ownership regulations led to rehearings in 2016 and 2019. The dispute was finally settled when the U.S. Supreme Court reversed the latest Appeals Court decision in 2021.

== Background ==
The Federal Communications Commission (FCC) enforces media ownership rules in which a single company is prohibited from owning more than a certain percentage of broadcasting stations (radio and television) across the entire country, or within a particular local media market. At the time of the original Prometheus dispute, the FCC also enforced a ban on media cross-ownership, in which any owner of a broadcasting station could not also own the same city's newspaper.

As required by the Telecommunications Act of 1996, the FCC must review its percentage ownership limit every two years. Before 2002, this limit was 35%, meaning that no single owner could control more than that percentage of broadcasting stations nationwide or within a single local market.

The FCC conducted its regular Biennial Review in 2002, and released its new findings in a Report and Order the following year. The Commission, under Chairman Michael Powell, retained its rules that encouraged media localism and diversity, but decided to raise the ownership limit to 45% in a significant relaxation of the previous rule. The Commission also eliminated previous cross-ownership restrictions except in small local media markets, determining that in larger local markers a single owner could own the city's newspaper in addition to a percentage of the broadcasting stations.

On the matter of diversity in media ownership. the FCC created a diversity index to determine how any merger between media companies would affect competition in a market. This index was based on the Herfindahl-Hirschman Index (HHI), which in turn is used by the Federal Trade Commission and Department of Justice to measure market concentration in any industry. The FCC determined that such a measurement would be necessary for small local media markers with shrinking numbers of media owners.

The media activist group Prometheus Radio Project, which supported local media ownership and opposed the ongoing concentration of the American media market, objected to the FCC's rule changes in 2003 and petitioned for judicial review at the Third Circuit Court of Appeals. A direct petition to this court was made possible by federal regulations regarding requests for review of agency actions with implications in multiple regions of the country. Prometheus Radio Project represented several media activist groups in the court action, while many media firms sided with the FCC.

== Prometheus I ruling ==
Initial arguments were heard by the Third Circuit in August 2003. Due to subsequent court actions, this case has come to be known as Prometheus I. Prometheus Radio Project requested an injunction against future enactment by the FCC of its newly formulated media ownership rules, arguing that the new rules violated provisions of the Telecommunications Act of 1996 that mandated media localism and required all administrative decisions to be made in the public interest. The activist group also argued that the FCC's newly created diversity index was built upon unsupported assumptions about the modern characteristics of local media markets.

The Third Circuit, in a ruling written by Judge Thomas L. Ambro, sided with Prometheus Radio Project and stayed enactment of the new media ownership percentage limit, as well as the relaxation of cross-ownership limits. This holding was based on a Third Circuit precedent in which an administrative action could be halted or delayed if the moving party could demonstrate irreparable harm to itself or communities that it represents. Meanwhile, Ambro determined that the FCC would face little harm if it was told not to enact new rules which had not yet been put into effect, while the parties worked on finding a resolution to the dispute.

Ambro ordered the FCC to reexamine its new media ownership rules to determine the implications for the public interest, thus reconciling the requirements of the 1996 Act on that matter with its other requirements for biennial reviews of the percentage ownership limits. Adjustments could then be made, but all changes must be supported by a reasoned analysis, which had not been done for the changes announced in 2003.

Ambro reasoned that the FCC, when relaxing its cross-ownership rules, had made erroneous assumptions that cable television and the Internet could fill the void caused by consolidation of media ownership. The FCC failed to address the uneven distribution of these types of media, or the fact that neither is likely to deliver local news. The court also found that the FCC's diversity index assigned too much importance to Internet availability and assumed that local market share indicated the influence of a media outlet.

Ambro also chastised the FCC for failing to inform the public about the methodology behind the diversity index. While the FCC had released a public notice that it was considering a new metric for determining media ownership limits, it never explained how results were to be determined, and did not invite public opinion on the issue.

Most of the other regulatory changes proposed by the FCC in its 2003 Report and Order were upheld by the court, such as local (as opposed to nationwide) TV and radio ownership rules, because there was evidence that the Commission had made use of analytical methods that had been standardized by the Department of Justice when it reviewed mergers of media companies. Otherwise, the majority's primary critiques of the new rules to be struck down was that the FCC proposed those changes under the unconvincing assumption that media outlets of different types make equal contributions to media diversity and competition.

=== Dissenting opinion ===
Judge Anthony Joseph Scirica issued a dissenting opinion (in part) in which he agreed with many of the majority's conclusions, but chastised the majority for forming its own assumptions on how the FCC interpreted its rulemaking authority. Scirica believed that the court should have deferred to the FCC's expertise on media ownership regulations, while the 1996 Telecommunications Act did not contain a "deregulatory presumption," so the burden of proof rested with those seeking to modify or eliminate the existing rules. Scirica also cited a precedent, FCC v. National Citizens Commission for Broadcasting, in which the Supreme Court determined that "diversity and its effects are… elusive concepts, not easily defined let alone measured without making qualitative judgments." Thus, the FCC should be given leeway in how it interprets rules to enhance this unclear concept.

=== Concurrent events ===
While Prometheus I was at trial, the U.S Congress passed the 2004 Consolidated Appropriations Act, which modified one provision of the 1996 Telecommunications Act by changing the nationwide percentage ownership limit for television stations from 35% to 39%. This made the FCC decision to include TV stations in its general ownership limit of 45% (as contested by Prometheus) partially moot.

The FCC appealed the Third Circuit ruling to the U.S. Supreme Court, but its petition for certiorari was denied in 2005. This allowed the Third Circuit decision to stand, so the FCC was instructed to adjust the changes to media ownership rules that it had proposed in 2003, for later review by the same court.

== Prometheus II, III, and IV rulings ==
The FCC addressed the changes that had been ordered by the Prometheus I court, and along with some other recent changes, issued an updated set of media ownership regulations in a Report and Order in late 2007. Due to the continuing decline of the newspaper industry, this document removed all broadcasting/newspaper cross-ownership restrictions. The FCC also requested that the injunction against enacting the 2003 regulations, also issued by the Prometheus I court, be lifted. This move was contested by several parties including Prometheus Radio Project. Thus, the Third Circuit opened another proceeding in 2009, now known as Prometheus II, to review these recent developments. The same three judges were present for this second proceeding.

The Third Circuit initially left the injunction in place until all parties could make their case during the upcoming arguments. The injunction was lifted in March 2010 after a preliminary determination by the court that the FCC had followed proper procedures when updating the original Report and Order from 2003. Further arguments by all parties continued, with the Third Circuit finally issuing its final ruling in July 2011, in which it partially vacated some of the FCC's media ownership regulations due to lack of precise definitions and justifications. This resulted in another round of regulatory adjustments by the Commission, to be followed by review by the same court.

After more adjustments and additional research by the FCC to justify its shifting media ownership rules, the same panel of judges issued another ruling, known as Prometheus III, in which the FCC was faulted for failing to fully define the term "eligible minority" for which it was hoping to encourage media ownership via its latest regulations. Yet another review by the Third Circuit, known as Prometheus IV, took place in 2019. In the words of the court, "here we go again" as it had now been seventeen years since the original disputed rule change. Meanwhile, the leadership at the FCC had changed several times, and in 2017 new chairman Ajit Pai, an opponent of media ownership regulations, adjusted the percentage limits yet again. That 2017 action was added to the Prometheus IV review at the Third Circuit in 2019.

Similarly to its three previous rulings, the Third Circuit again upheld some of the FCC's changes to media ownership limits but struck down others due to poor reasoning and lack of evidence for their potential success or usefulness. The arguments of both the FCC and Prometheus Radio Project were found to have merit. Thus, there was still an injunction against the enactment of some of the FCC's post-2002 media ownership regulations, and the court fully expected the judicial battle to continue. Judge Scirica again dissented in part and recommended that FCC be given deference in its interpretations of its rulemaking authority. This ruling was appealed to the U.S. Supreme Court, which reversed the Prometheus IV ruling in 2021. The high court ruled that sparse evidence on the benefits of female and minority ownership of broadcasting stations did not support the FCC's ownership regulations, and all such regulations should be supported by sufficient evidence per the requirements of the Administrative Procedure Act. This Supreme Court decision was not appealed, and the legal dispute apparently came to an end.

== Influence and reactions ==
The lengthy Prometheus court battle, and the inability of judges and regulators to reconcile conflicting goals for media ownership and diversity, have attracted criticism from media activists and legal researchers.

On the matter of FCC attempts to quantify the media diversity that it is trying to achieve, Johannes Bauer and Steven Wildman noted that "By no stretch of the imagination could it be said that new ownership policies [from the FCC] were produced through application of a welfare calculus employed to identify new policy optima," and that diversity is not a clear concept and therefore is difficult to prove. According to Aaron Perzanowski, Congress needs to reassert itself as the final arbiter of media policy, since "Media concentration, because it results in an ever-decreasing number of sources of publicly available information, poses a serious threat to the development of an informed public."

Other researchers have concluded that the inconclusive results of the Prometheus saga indicate the need for new outlooks on media diversity, especially in light of more recent media technologies and corporate consolidation. As noted by Stephanie DeClerk: "Hopefully, the FCC will begin to recognize the drawbacks of media ownership deregulation" and will begin to "create new media rules for the [twenty-first] century that foster diversity and protect local media". David Pritchard et al. have argued that arguments both for and against cross-ownership regulations have become moot, due to evidence that different media outlets can have diverse viewpoints even if they have the same owner. A similar conclusion was reached by Daniel Ho and Kevin Quinn, who noted "In short, [media] consolidation does not inexorably lead to convergence or divergence."

== See also ==
- Prometheus Radio Project
- Concentration of media ownership
- Telecommunications Act of 1996
