= Low-power broadcasting =

Radio or TV service, 100W or less

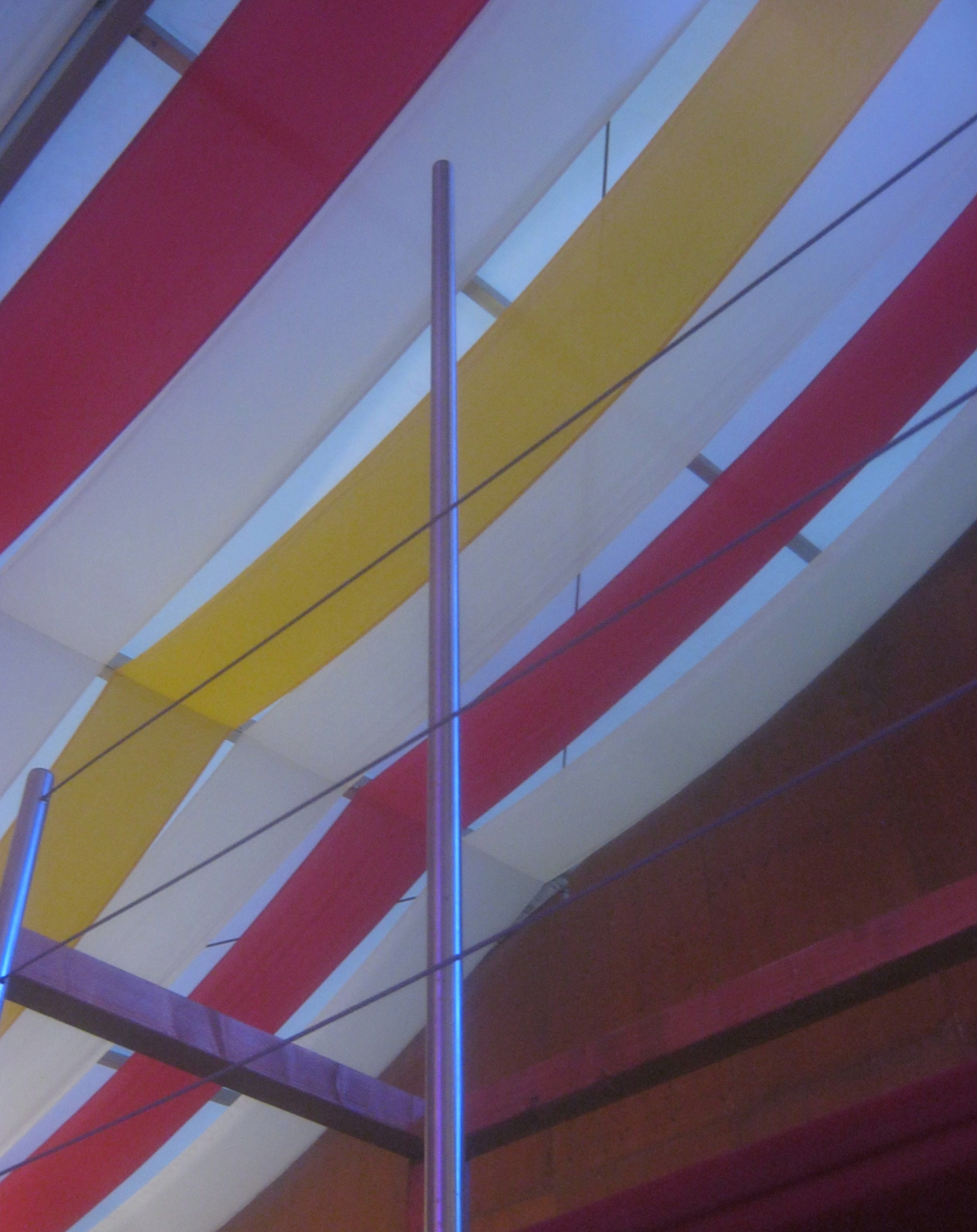
An LPAM antenna in a beer tent

Low-power broadcasting is broadcasting by a broadcast station at a low transmitter power output to a smaller service area than "full power" stations within the same region. It is often distinguished from "micropower broadcasting" (more commonly "microbroadcasting") and broadcast translators. LPAM, LPFM and LPTV are in various levels of use across the world, varying widely based on the laws and their enforcement.

== Canada ==
Radio communications in Canada are regulated by the Radio Communications and Broadcasting Regulatory Branch, a branch of Industry Canada, in conjunction with the Canadian Radio-television and Telecommunications Commission (CRTC). Interested parties must apply for both a certificate from Industry Canada and a license from CRTC in order to operate a radio station. Industry Canada manages the technicalities of spectrum space and technological requirements whereas content regulation is conducted more so by CRTC.

LPAM stations are authorized to operate with less than 100 watts of power.

LPFM is broken up into two classes in Canada, Low (50 watts) and Very Low (10 watts). The transmitters therefore range from 1 to 50 watts, as opposed to 1 to 100 watts in the U.S. As of 2000, 500 licenses (very low and low-power FM) have been issued. These transmitters are generally only allowed in remote areas.

Stations in the low-power class are subject to the same CRTC licensing requirements, and will generally follow the same call sign format, as full-power stations. Stations in the very low-power class formerly had to have CRTC licenses as well, although a series of CRTC regulation changes in the early 2000s exempted most such stations from licensing; a station in this class will usually not have a conventional call sign, but will instead be identified in a naming format consisting of a four-digit number preceded by the letters CH for a television station or VF for a radio station.

The regulation of spectrum space is strict in Canada, as well having restrictions on second and third adjacent channels, along with other protections for AM and FM commercial radio. In addition, because there have been a few cases that found that FM frequencies have caused interference to the aeronautical navigation and communications (NAV/COM) spectrum (though evidence is not very concrete presently), pirate radio regulation has remained very strict as well. However, the two regulating bodies do have certain exemptions. For example, low-power announcement transmitters that meet the requirement of Broadcasting Equipment Technical Standards 1, Limited Duration Special Events Distribution Undertakings, Temporary Resource Development Distribution Undertakings, and Public Emergency Radio Undertakings are a few instances, which according to certain criteria, may be exempt from certificate/license requirements.

A television station is considered very low power if its power does not exceed 2 watts for a VHF station, or 10 watts for a UHF station. Low-power analog & digital television stations are authorized to operate with up to 50 watts in VHF, or 500 watts for a UHF station.

== New Zealand ==
In New Zealand, residents are allowed a broadcast license (free-of-charge) at a maximum of 1 watt EIRP in the FM guardbands from 87.6 to 88.3 and from 106.7 to 107.7 MHz under a General User Radio License (GURL), which is issued by Radio Spectrum Management, managed by the Ministry of Business, Innovation and Employment. Prior to June 2010, the lower band was located between 88.1 and 88.8 and a maximum of 500 mW EIRP allowed. Broadcasters on these frequencies have no protection from interference from other licensed or unlicensed broadcasters. Contact details must also be broadcast every hour.

Further restrictions are in place for the protection of aeronautical services. Use of the following frequencies is not permitted within certain boundaries approaching Auckland and Wellington airports: 107.5 to 107.7, and 107.0 to 107.3 MHz, respectively.

There exists a 25 km broadcast translator rule: a transmitter must be at least 25 km from any other transmitter carrying substantially the same programme.

There are efforts on self-regulation of the broadcasters themselves. The NZRSM Radio Inspectors do, however, regularly monitor and make random unannounced visits to broadcasters, and will impose fines for violations of the regulations. New broadcasters are also subject to an initial compulsory inspection.

== United Kingdom ==
Temporary low-power stations are allowed at times via a restricted service licence. Since 2001, long-term low-power FM licenses have been available in remote areas of the country. These are currently used for many establishments, including military bases, universities and hospitals with fixed boundaries. On 18 June 2021, Ofcom (Office of Communications) began a trial of expanding the number of LPFM stations in the United Kingdom by issuing licenses to broadcast to many more hospitals and military bases. This was done in order to see if such broadcasts could be feasibly achieved in events where they would be needed without interfering with other broadcasts.

== United States ==
=== FM radio ===
Low power FM (LPFM) is a non-commercial educational broadcast radio service created by the Federal Communications Commission in the United States in 2000. LPFM licenses, which are limited to a maximum effective radiated power (ERP) of 100 watts, may be issued to non-commercial educational entities, as well as public safety and transportation organizations. Individuals and holders of other types of broadcast licenses are not eligible. In addition, LPFM stations are not protected from interference from other classes of FM stations.

==== LPFM classes ====
- Class L1 (LP100) is to 100 watts effective radiated power (ERP). (47 CFR 73.811)
- Class L2 (L10) is at least 1 and up to 10 watts ERP. (47 CFR 73.811)

In addition, Class D educational licenses exist for stations of 10 watts transmitter power output (TPO) or less, regardless of ERP. These stations are all grandfathered operations, as no new licenses of this type have been issued since 1978, except in Alaska. They are not considered to be LPFM stations, although they operate noncommercially and have similar coverage areas to Class L2 stations.

==== Legislation ====
===== Origins of LPFM =====
In January 2000, the Federal Communications Commission established Low Power FM (LPFM) as a new designated class of radio station. These stations were allowed to operate at 1–10 or 50–100 watts of power, compared to the minimum requirement for commercial stations at 100 watts. (47 CFR 73.211). Originally, it was supported by activists and groups associated with American progressivism; music artists (such as Bonnie Raitt); religious leaders/churches (such as the United Church of Christ); and educators (for example, American Library Association, the Communication Workers of America labor union, the National League of Cities).

The original purpose of LPFM was to serve as an alternative to "radio homogenization", described in 2001 in the J & MC Quarterly, as "... Necessary to offset the growing consolidation of station ownership in the wake of the Telecommunications Act of 1996, which removed caps on radio ownership, as well as the decline of locally produced radio programming." The main opposition to LPFMs came from the National Association of Broadcasters (NAB), which opposed the act on grounds to "maintain spectrum integrity" for commercial broadcasting, according to NAB President Edward O. Fritts.

===== Radio Broadcasting Preservation Act of 2000 =====
Pressure from the National Association of Broadcasters urged Congress to slip the Radio Broadcasting Preservation Act of 2000 into a general spending bill then moving through Congress. President Bill Clinton signed the bill in December 2000. The bill passed by Congress (H.R.567) was meant to tighten standards for LPFM stations, making it harder for them to be approved, to protect full-power FM stations through certain provisions:

1. The FCC has the ability and jurisdiction to license LPFM stations.
2. Third adjacent channel interference protections require LPFM stations to be separated by at least 0.6 MHz from all other stations, to prevent signal interference.
3. Applicants who have engaged in the unlicensed operation of any station cannot receive LPFM licenses.
4. The FCC agreed to commission studies on the interference by, and economic impact of, LPFM on full-power stations (the findings, later published in the MITRE Corporation Report, suggest that third adjacent channel interference protections may not be necessary).

This act shifted policy making from the FCC to Congress, which was considered an insult against the FCC.

===== Local Community Radio Act of 2005 =====
The Local Community Radio Act of 2005 was introduced by Senators John McCain, Maria Cantwell and Patrick Leahy. After the FCC complied with the provisions of the Radio Broadcasting Act of 2000 by commissioning the MITRE Report to test if there was significant interference from LPFM stations on the full-power stations, the study showed that the interference of LPFM is minimal and would not have a significant effect on other stations. According to Sen. Leahy, "This bill will open up the airwaves to truly local broadcasting while protecting full-power broadcasters from unreasonable interference and preserving important services such as reading services for the blind."

===== Local Community Radio Act of 2007 =====
Sponsored in the U.S. House of Representatives by Congressmen Mike Doyle and Lee Terry and in the United States Senate by Senators Maria Cantwell and John McCain, the Local Community Radio Act of 2007 never came to a vote. The House bill, H.R. 2802, was referred to the Subcommittee on Telecommunications and the Internet on June 21, 2007. Since the bill was not passed in FY 2007, the bill was removed from the docket as Never Passed.

===== Local Community Radio Act of 2009 =====
This bill was an update of the Local Community Radio Act of 2007. It would have required the FCC to alter current rules by removing the minimum frequency separation between low-power FM stations and third-adjacent channel stations. Previously, there was a minimum frequency separation; however the FCC found that LPFM stations did not cause any interference on third-adjacent channel stations, thus eliminating the need for such a requirement.

The Local Community Radio Act of 2009 also would have required that the FCC keep the rules that offer interference protection to third-adjacent channels that offer a radio reading service (the reading of newspapers, books or magazines for those who are blind or hearing impaired). This protection will ensure that such channels are not subject to possible interference by LPFM stations.

The final part of the bill required that when giving out licenses to FM stations, the FCC must make sure that these licenses are also available to LPFM stations and that licensing decisions are made with regard to local community needs. The bill had unanimous bipartisan support from FCC leadership. It was passed by the House and referred to the Senate.

===== Local Community Radio Act of 2010 =====
The Local Community Radio Act of 2010 (based upon the legislation originally introduced in 2005) was signed into law by President Barack Obama on January 4, 2011, as Pub. L. 111–371 (text) (PDF), after passage in the House on December 17, 2010, and the U.S. Senate on December 18, 2010. In a statement after the bill became law, Federal Communications Commission chairman Julius Genachowski said, "Low power FM stations are small, but they make a giant contribution to local community programming. This important law eliminates the unnecessary restrictions that kept these local stations off the air in cities and towns across the country." The Act states that the Federal Communications Commission, when licensing new FM translator stations, FM booster stations, and low-power FM stations, should ensure that licenses are available to FM translator stations, FM booster stations, and low-power FM stations; such decisions are made based on the needs of the local community; and FM translator stations, FM booster stations, and low-power FM stations remain equal in status and secondary to existing and modified full-service FM stations.

In general, the FCC was to modify its rules to eliminate third-adjacent minimum frequency separation requirements between low-power FM stations; and full-service FM stations, FM translator stations, and FM booster stations.

==== Arguments for LPFM ====
- Free Press, a non-partisan advocacy organization pushing for media reform, promoting "diversity and independent media ownership, strong public media, and universal access to communications," voiced its support of LPFM for a variety of reasons:
  - It strengthens community identity.
  - It creates an outlet for amateur musicians to have their music heard.
  - It promotes diversity on the air because more women and racial minorities are represented.
  - It creates an opportunity for young people, especially college students, who are interested in radio to learn about the business.
  - It provides farmers with up to date agricultural information.
- Prometheus Radio Project, a non-profit organization that "builds, supports, and advocates for community radio stations which empower participatory community voices and movements for social change," also supported LPFM, citing these reasons:
  - The media should not limit democratic participation but should provide a way for communities and movements to express themselves
  - Public airwaves shouldn't be concentrated in private/corporate hands
  - Low Power FM gives a voice to communities
  - Low Power FM needs to be protected from big broadcasters

A New York Times article focusing on a LPFM station, KOCZ-LP, highlights a number of key arguments favoring low-powered broadcasting:

- "In Louisiana, a large African-American community appreciates how LPFM plays a genre of music called zydeco, a potent blend of Cajun, rhythm and blues and, among a younger generation, hip-hop, often features accordion and washboard."
- LPFM influences commercial radio to offer listeners a wider range of music. "Commercial stations had started playing more zydeco since KOCZ started broadcasting in 2002. 'They know that we make them better,' an advocate said."
- Because LPFM is non-commercial, schools and organizations are able to promote many projects that help serve the local community. "KOCZ is licensed to the Southern Development Foundation, a civil rights group that grants scholarships and runs a business incubator but has fallen on hard times. The foundation treats the station as a 24-hour form of community outreach. "
- LPFM promotes a very close community. "A woman walked into the station ... asked for an announcement to be broadcast about her lost dog... 'She was able to get her dog back the next day'"
- LPFM is crucial for small communities in times of emergencies. "A low power FM radio station can stay on the air even if the power goes out. Low power FM saved lives during Katrina."

Former President Bill Clinton has also become an advocate of LPFM for "giving voice to the voiceless", including schools, community-based organizations, churches, and ethnic groups.

Brown Paper Tickets CEO Steve Butcher supports LPFM, stating in a letter to the FCC, "We hear from event producers frequently who can't afford radio ad buys on commercial stations. These local entrepreneurs can afford underwriting on smaller stations that can help build awareness about their events."

LPFM stations are considered to be affordable compared to an average FM station, whose operating costs can run up to a million dollars, and could only afforded by businesses and the very wealthy. An antenna and transmitter can cost between $2,000 and $5,000.

==== Arguments against LPFM ====
- Signal interference on FM station – High-power FM stations express concern that LPFM stations may cause interference with their signals if third adjacent-channel interference protections are not observed. While the Mitre Report suggests that the likelihood for interference is not as threatening as previously thought, high-power FM stations question the methodology, scope and validity of the study and its results.
- FM translators – These devices allow a radio station to rebroadcast its signal to reach a greater area. FM translators could benefit religious broadcasters wishing to reach a larger audience, as well as many AM radio stations who, due to ionospheric refraction, are required to emit weaker signals during the night. FM translators are low-power, so compete with LPFM for limited space on the airwaves.
- In some states, the local Department of Transportation operates large networks of LPFM stations that act as highway advisory radio stations – a service traditionally operated at the fringes of the AM band – restricting the number of available channels (these systems can be licensed to the entire AM band, but the LPFM service provides considerably greater coverage at 100 watts than the 10-watt limit on AM – hence the considerable appeal for government agencies).
- Some investors in radio believe LPFM services prevent the development of digital radio.
- NPR is a major opponent to low-power FM. Their stance is that allowing more flexible rules for LPFM would burden other stations by forcing them to deal with interference problems and because full-power broadcasters reach a broader audience and provide a greater service, they should be favored regarding spectrum availability.
- The National Association of Broadcasters is the other major source of opposition. Its stance is that full-power FM broadcasters "enhance localism" by providing community-responsive information such as emergency information. Allowing low-power FM stations to have equal spectrum rights could be detrimental to these necessary programs.

==== LPFM vs. broadcast translators ====
Unlike the former FM class D license, an LPFM station has no priority over broadcast translators in the allocation of available spectrum. This is problematic insofar as the regulations for broadcast translators exempts non-commercial stations from the requirement that translators be within the coverage area of the original station that they rebroadcast. However, this provision only affects translators in the non-commercial portion of the band. Stations in the commercial part of the spectrum must be fed over the air unless they are within the actual service area of the primary station. Since the translator window of 2003 was only open for commercial channels, the use of directly-fed via satellite FM translators, commonly called "Satellators", was never a factor in the 2003 window.

The FCC licensing window for new translator applications in 2003 resulted in over 13,000 applications being filed, most of them coming from a few religious broadcasters. However even though all translators on commercial frequencies must be fed by a direct, over-the-air source, regardless of who owns the translator per FCC rule 74.1231(b), the actual over-the-air source (the primary station) can be satellite fed, just as commercial stations can be fed by satellite. This leads to programming from a single station (retransmitted by many others) ending up on several hundred different translators. One station cannot apply for hundreds or thousands of translators nationwide, using automated means to generate license applications for all available channels, unless all of their applications are exclusively on the non-commercial part of the broadcast band (88–91.9 MHz). (47 CFR 74.1231(b)) As with any new service that shares the FM spectrum, when translators are added to an area, they can reduce or eliminate the availability of channels both for new LPFM applicants and for relocation of any existing LPFM stations displaced by full-service broadcasters. Unlike an LPFM station, a translator is not required to (and legally not authorized to) originate any local content except as permitted by 47 CFR 74.1231. Thus there is competition for spectrum in some locations between the LPFM service and the FM translator service.

In May 2018, several groups supporting community-based low-power FM stations filed objections with the FCC, citing the Local Community Radio Act, accusing it of favoring existing station coverage expansion with translator licenses - "a spectrum grab" - over new LPFM spectrum licenses.

=== AM radio ===
The acronym 'LPAM' is not a legal term in the United States and is only used as an acronym. Unlike LPFM stations, which have legal and regulatory status, FCC rules do not define "LPAM" nor issue licenses for low-power AM transmission. LPAM is only an acronym applied to licensed low-power AM operations and to Part 15 transmissions as well.

Any use of the term "low power AM" in FCC licensing for United States stations is the requirement for higher-power licensed AM stations to reduce their transmit power at nighttime – post-sunset / pre-sunrise – as a condition of their high-power broadcast authorization. There is a category class D for AM broadcast licenses, which limited stations to daytime-only transmission before regulations changed in the 1980s. Many, but not all, class D stations have been granted authority to broadcast at night with enough power to be heard within a few miles of their transmitters.

Other LPAM operations are known as Travelers' Information Stations (TIS), sometimes also called highway advisory radio (HAR). Authorized under FCC Part 90.242, these are stations licensed to local transportation departments or other governmental or quasi-governmental agencies to provide bulletins to motorists regarding traffic conditions. These are often near highways and airports, and occasionally other tourism attractions such as national parks. Some are used by chemical and nuclear facilities for emergency evacuation information systems, others by public safety entities for mobile operations.

Music is not allowed on TIS/HAR stations, and they are restricted to only 3 kHz wide, "low-fidelity audio", compared to the 10 kHz audio for standard AM broadcasters and 15 kHz audio permitted on FM stations. (Modern AM stations in the US actually restrict their audio from 5 kHz down to 2.5 kHz - roughly the same as to TIS stations. TIS transmissions are normally authorized for 10 watts or less, although some higher authorizations exist, primarily in locations where emergency evacuation may become necessary. The 60–watt TIS stations on 1640 and 1680 kHz at Dallas/Fort Worth International Airport have the highest licensed power among full-time TIS stations.

=== Television ===
Low Power Television stations in the US by community of license

There are more than 2,450 licensed low-power television (LPTV) stations in the U.S., which are located in markets of all sizes, from New York City (five stations, though more exist in the market from other cities of license) down to Junction City, Kansas (two stations).

LPTV (-LP) and LPTV Digital (-LD) are common in the U.S., Canada and most of the Americas, where most stations originate their own programming. Stations that do not originate their own programming are designated as translators (-TX). The Community Broadcasters Act of 1998 directed the FCC to create a classification of LPTV licenses called Class A (-CA) and Class A Digital (-CD). Digital low-power and Class-A television stations have an ERP limit of 3,000 watts (3 kW) for VHF, and 15 kilowatts for UHF.

The LPTV service is considered a secondary service by the FCC, which means the licensee is not guaranteed protection from interference or displacement. An LPTV station must accept harmful interference from full-service television stations and may not cause harmful interference to any full-service television station (the FCC defines interference levels deemed to be "harmful"). The problem with potential displacement was made evident during the transition of broadcasting in the United States from analog to digital. All television stations operating on UHF channels 38 and above were required to move to channel 36 or below. Full-service stations were guaranteed a place to land in the new compressed band while LPTV stations operating on channels 38 and above were required to either enter a channel-sharing agreement with another station or lose their license.

==== Class A LPTV stations ====
The FCC provided a one-time filing opportunity for existing LPTV stations to become Class A stations. The designation was only available to LPTV stations that were producing two hours per week of local programming. Class A stations had to maintain a production studio within their Grade B contour, and comply with many of the requirements placed on full-service television stations. This allowed them to obtain protected channel status.

==== Must-carry ====
One of the key distinctions between full-service television stations and low-power stations is cable television and direct broadcast satellite (DBS) carriage. Full-service stations are guaranteed carriage in their local television market through "must-carry" whereas LPTV stations are not. In 2008, there was an effort put forward by FCC chairman Kevin Martin to grant must-carry rights to Class A LPTV stations. The effort failed due to a lack of support from the other FCC commissioners.

==== Network affiliates ====
Though many low-power television stations are either unaffiliated, or broadcast programming from small networks meant for their use, some LPTV stations are affiliated with minor broadcast networks like The CW Plus or MyNetworkTV. Examples include in Boston, Massachusetts with NBC on WBTS-CD; Youngstown, Ohio, where a pair of LPTV stations based at WYFX-LD broadcast Fox programming, along with the digital subchannel of the co-owned CBS affiliate, WKBN-TV; or in the Lima, Ohio area, whose low-power stations are affiliates of major networks, such as CBS and ABC.

==== Digital transition ====
On July 15, 2011, the FCC issued an order to low-power broadcasters that effectively required all remaining television transmitters to vacate channels 52 to 69 by December 31, 2011. Originally, all low power analog TV stations were required to shut off by September 1, 2015, however, the deadline for low-power television stations and translators was postponed due to a spectrum auction that took place. While Class-A television stations were required to sign off on September 1, 2015, the last remaining low-powered analog television stations had signed off by July 13, 2021.

Unlike AM and FM, unlicensed use of television bands is prohibited for broadcasting. The amateur television channels do allow for some very limited non-entertainment transmissions however, with some repeaters airing NASA TV during Space Shuttle missions when they are not in local use.

The low-power television industry was represented by the Community Broadcasters Association (CBA), which held its annual convention each year in October and an annual meeting each year in April at the National Association of Broadcasters Convention in Las Vegas. The meeting was open to anyone interested in the low-power television industry. On August 13, 2009, the CBA announced in a statement that it would shut down after 20 years of representing LPTV stations. One reason given was the "restrictive regulations that kept the Class A and LPTV industry from realizing its potential". Another was the inability to reach most viewers, partly due to multichannel video programming distributors refusing to carry these channels. In addition, Amy Brown, former CBA executive director, said, "some 40% of Class A and LPTV station operators believe they will have to shut down in the next year if they are not helped through the digital transition."

In February 2006, the FCC released its Notices of Proposed Rules for Digital Radio. The Commission reaffirms its commitment to provide broadcasters with the opportunity to take advantage of digital audio broadcasting (DAB) technology, proposed criteria for evaluating models and systems, such as the In-band on-channel (IBOC) system, and inquired on the needs for a mandatory DAB transmission standard.

In section 39 of the Notice, the FCC inquires as how to balance incentives for broadcasters to switch to digital systems with incumbents of new entrance opportunities, stating that they "seek analyses of the minimum power levels that would preserve service within protected service areas in an all-digital environment, and alternatively, the levels that would not result in significant disruptions to current listening patterns."

The DAB system that was identified as the best fit for LPFM was IBOC. This hybrid system uses existing frequencies and can operate carrying digital information along with analog broadcast signal on the sidebands. However, the digital carriers require the bandwidth to be widened, which would cause interference to stations on the first adjacent channel. If LPFM adopts IBOC, then LPFM would also need to accept a second adjacent channel restriction between two LPFM stations, as there is a potential that the sidebands of two LPFM stations would overlap causing interference. As of 2008, imposing a second adjacent channel restriction would impact less than 10 LPFM stations.

== See also ==
- Carrier current#Low-power broadcasting stations
- List of broadcast station classes – Explanation on broadcasting classes
- North American call sign – How call signs and classes are used in North America
- ITU prefix – How callsigns and classes are used worldwide
- List of LPFM stations in New Zealand
- Cognitive radio
- Wireless mesh network
