= WORT =

Community radio station in Madison, Wisconsin, United States

- Madison, Wisconsin; United States
- Frequency: 89.9 MHz
- Branding: Eighty Nine.Nine FM; Community Radio

Programming
- Format: community radio
- Affiliations: NFCB; Pacifica Radio; Wisconsin Broadcasters Association

Ownership
- Owner: Back Porch Radio Broadcasting, Inc.

History
- First air date: December 1, 1975
- Call sign meaning: The third choice after original choice WOMB was turned down at an early station meeting and second choice WART was unavailable.

Technical information
- Licensing authority: FCC
- Facility ID: 3596
- Class: B1
- ERP: 2,000 watts
- HAAT: 286 meters (938 ft)
- Transmitter coordinates: 43°3′3.0″N 89°29′13.4″W

Links
- Public license information: Public file; LMS
- Website: www.wortfm.org

WORT (89.9 MHz) is a listener-sponsored community radio station in Madison, Wisconsin.

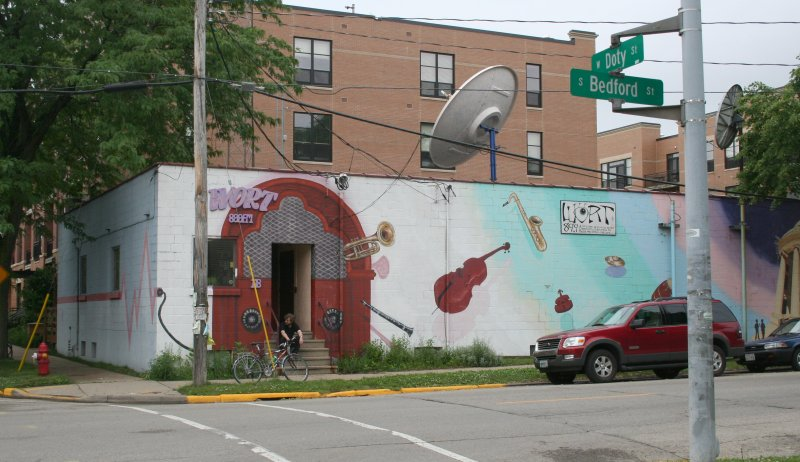
The exterior of the WORT studio building.

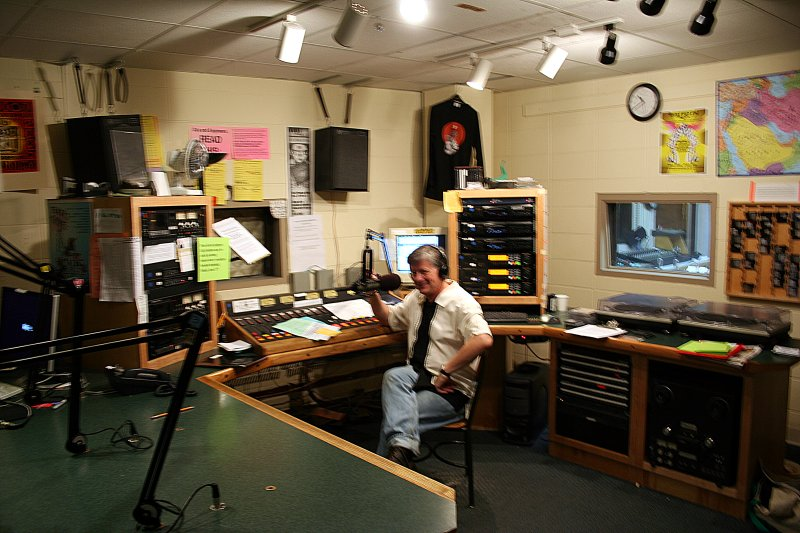
John Kraniak at the controls during his show, "Entertainment", in WORT's main studio.

== Awards ==
WORT has been voted "Madison's Favorite Radio Station" in the Isthmus Annual Manual (readers' poll) sixteen times. Several of its programs have made the top three list of favorite radio shows, including Mel & Floyd (multiple years), Back to the Country, and Pan-Africa.

WORT's news department frequently wins awards from the Wisconsin Broadcasters Association as well as the Milwaukee Press Club.

WORT received two Wisconsin Broadcasters Association Merit Awards for its 2006 documentary on Uganda's "invisible children" and its 2005 documentary on the Hurricane Katrina aftermath. It won best documentary in 2005 from Public Radio News Directors Incorporated for its investigation of pollution at the Madison Kipp factory. It also received a WBA Merit Award for its 2005 election lead-up coverage. In 2016, it received three Milwaukee Press Club awards, including a first-place award for coverage of the 2015 shooting of Tony Robinson. In 2020, it received two Milwaukee Press Club awards for best news coverage, for stories on protests after the firing of a local school security guard and a local community grocery store.

In 2021, the station received five Wisconsin Broadcaster's Association awards, including a first-place award for a report on the removal of a neighborhood's postal services. It also won five awards from the Milwaukee Press Club, including a gold award for a report on the Dow Chemical Company protests in 1967, and a gold award for reporting on disparate medical treatment and outcomes for Black women in Dane County.

== Affiliations ==
WORT is a member of the National Federation of Community Broadcasters and the Grassroots Radio Coalition. The station hosted the GRC-5 Conference in 2000 and GRC-11 in 2006.

WORT is an affiliate of Pacifica Radio, the World Association of Community Radio Broadcasters (AMARC). The station is also a member of the Wisconsin Broadcasters Association.

== History ==
WORT went on the air on December 1, 1975, broadcasting at 89.7 FM from Winnebago Avenue. The station later moved to Bedford Street, and the frequency was later changed to 89.9 FM.

Radio host Michael Feldman became a volunteer in 1977, broadcasting "The Breakfast Special" from a diner on Madison's east side every morning for several years before joining Wisconsin Public Radio.

=== 2018 studio shooting ===
Early in the morning of August 5, 2018, a masked suspect entered the station's studios and began shooting. Five shots were fired at three hosts, with on-air personality Eugene Crisler'EL taking a shot in his right buttock; he was treated and released from the hospital quickly after the incident, and some minor studio damage occurred. The station remained in dead air for 6½ hours until Madison Police finished their evidence gathering procedures and allowed broadcasting to resume; the police have said the incident was not random, but targeted at the station.

== See also ==
- List of community radio stations in the United States
