= WERU-FM =

- Blue Hill, Maine; United States
- Broadcast area: Mid Coast; Down East; Bar Harbor; Bangor, Maine
- Frequency: 89.9 MHz
- Branding: Community Radio

Programming
- Format: Variety
- Affiliations: National Federation of Community Broadcasters; Pacifica radio; PRX

Ownership
- Owner: Salt Pond Community Broadcasting Company
- Sister stations: Radio Sumpul in El Salvador

History
- First air date: May 1, 1988
- Call sign meaning: "We Are You"

Technical information
- Licensing authority: FCC
- Facility ID: 58726
- Class: B
- ERP: 12,000 watts
- HAAT: 261 meters (856 ft)
- Transmitter coordinates: 44°26′4″N 68°35′25″W

Links
- Public license information: Public file; LMS
- Webcast: Listen live
- Website: weru.org

WERU-FM (89.9 MHz) is a noncommercial, listener-sponsored community radio station licensed to Blue Hill, Maine. It is owned by the Salt Pond Community Broadcasting Company. WERU-FM has studios in East Orland and its transmitter is on Blue Hill Mountain off Mountain Road.

The station has an effective radiated power (ERP) of 12,000 watts, using a tower at 261 meters (856 feet) in height above average terrain (HAAT). In July 2004, the station began streaming online, and in April 2006, started providing podcasts of its spoken word programming. It holds periodic on-air fundraisers to support the station.

== History ==
WERU-FM signed on the air on May 1, 1988. From its inception, WERU-FM has been a grassroots, nonprofit organization, volunteer-powered and listener-supported community radio service. Paul Stookey, of the pop group Peter, Paul and Mary, was the station's first benefactor.

In 1997, the station moved its studios to the current location on U.S. Route 1 in East Orland.In 2005, WERU-FM formed a partnership with Radio Sumpul in Chalatenango, El Salvador, a community radio station started after the Salvadoran Civil War.

Music programming is diverse and includes genres such as folk music, Americana, blues, rock, jazz, and reggae.

WERU-FM is a member of the National Federation of Community Broadcasters, World Association of Community Radio Broadcasters, Maine Association of Broadcasters, and Maine Association of Nonprofits. The station is also a founding member of the Grassroots Radio Coalition.

== See also ==
- List of community radio stations in the United States
