= Community radio =

Community-owned and operated radio service

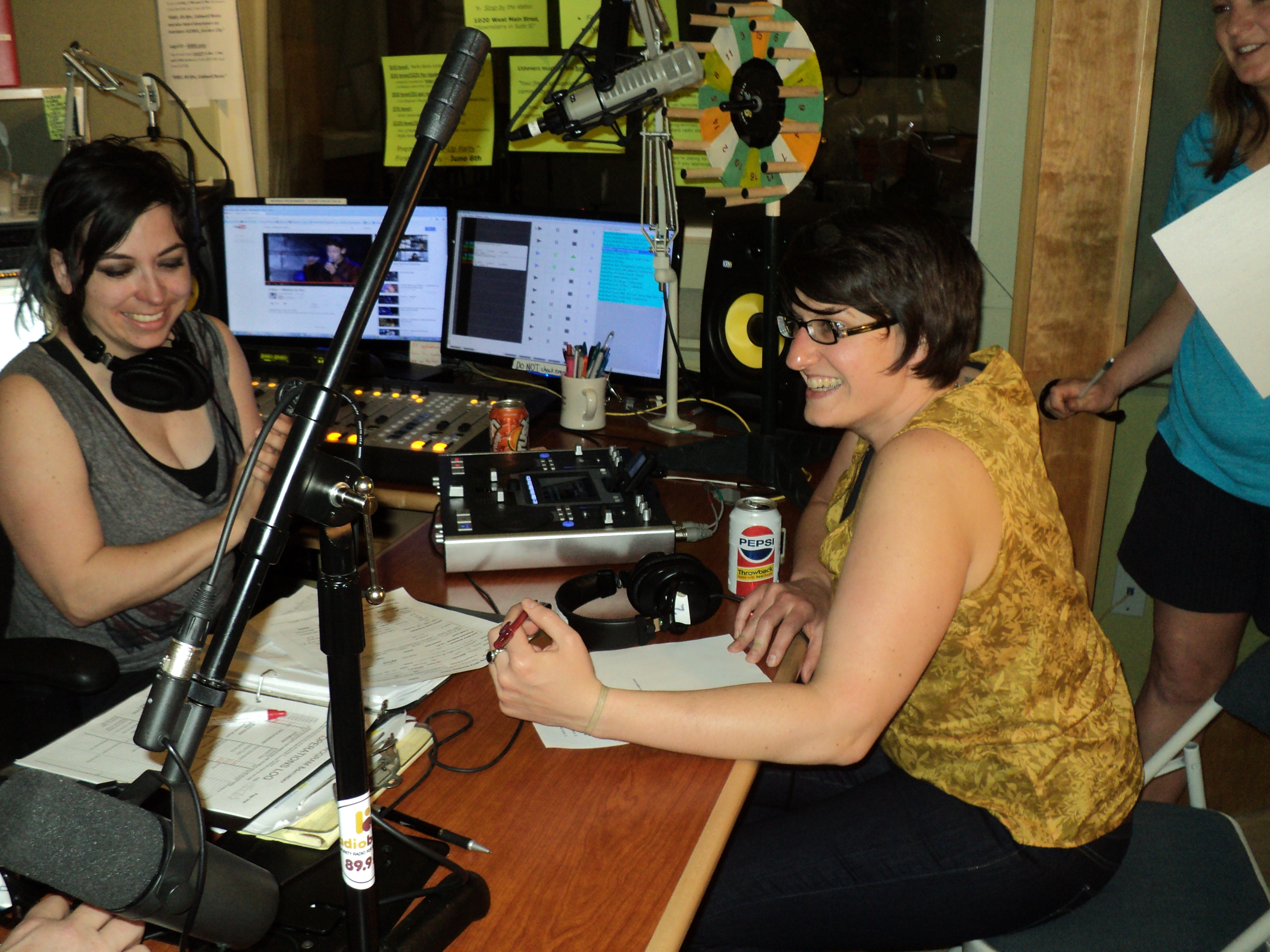
KRBX Radio Boise volunteers during the station's Spring Radiothon in 2013—direct community support is critical for such local media.

Community radio is a radio service offering a third model of radio broadcasting in addition to commercial and public broadcasting.

Community stations serve geographic communities and communities of interest. They broadcast content that is popular and relevant to a local, specific audience but is often overlooked by commercial (or) mass-media broadcasters. Community radio stations are operated, owned, and influenced by the communities they serve. They are generally nonprofit and provide a mechanism for enabling individuals, groups, and communities to tell their own stories, to share experiences and, in a media-rich world, to become creators and contributors of media.

In many parts of the world, community radio acts as a vehicle for the community and voluntary sector, civil society, agencies, NGOs and citizens to work in partnership to further community development aims, in addition to broadcasting. There is legally defined community radio (as a distinct broadcasting sector) in many countries, such as France, Argentina, South Africa, Australia and Ireland. Much of the legislation has included phrases such as "social benefit", "social objectives" and "social gain" as part of the definition. Community radio has developed differently in different countries, and the term has somewhat different meanings in the United Kingdom, Ireland, the United States, Canada and Australia, where freedom of speech laws and de facto realities differ.

== Vision, philosophy, and status ==
Modern community radio stations serve their listeners by offering a variety of content that is not necessarily provided by the larger commercial radio stations. Community radio outlets may carry news and information programming geared toward the local area (particularly immigrant or minority groups who are poorly served by major media outlets). Specialized musical shows are also often a feature of many community radio stations. Community and pirate stations (in areas where they are tolerated) can be valuable assets for a region. Community radio stations typically avoid content found on commercial outlets such as Top 40 music, sports and "drive-time" personalities. A meme used by members of the movement is that community radio should be 10 percent radio and 90 percent community. This means that community radio stations should focus on getting the community talking and not solely on radio (which is a technological process); the social concerns of community radio are stressed over radio per se. There is also a distinction drawn in contrast to mainstream stations, which are viewed as pandering to commercial concerns or the personalities of presenters.

=== Conceptions of community in the literature ===
Communities are complex entities, and what constitutes the "community" in community radio is subject to debate which varies by country. "Community" may be replaced by terms such as "alternative", "radical" or "citizen" radio. In sociology, a "community" has been defined as a group of interacting people living in a common location.

Community radio has been built around the ideals of access and participation. Stations have been run by locals, typically to serve a local audience. However, the internet's availability and popularity has encouraged many stations to podcast and/or stream and audio and make it available globally.

=== Models ===
Two philosophical approaches to community radio exist, although the models are not mutually exclusive. One emphasizes service and community-mindedness, focusing on what the station can do for the community. The other stresses involvement and participation by the listener.

In the service model, locality is valued; community radio, as a third tier, can provide content focused on a more local or particular community than a larger operation. Sometimes, though, providing syndicated content not already available within the station's service area is viewed as public service. Within the United States, for example, many stations syndicate content from groups such as Pacifica Radio (such as Democracy Now!) on the basis that it provides content not otherwise available (because of a program's lack of appeal to advertisers—in Pacifica's case, due to its politically controversial nature).

In the access (or participatory) model, the participation of community members in producing content is viewed as a good in itself. While this model does not necessarily exclude a service approach, there is some disagreement between the two.

== By country ==
=== Australia ===
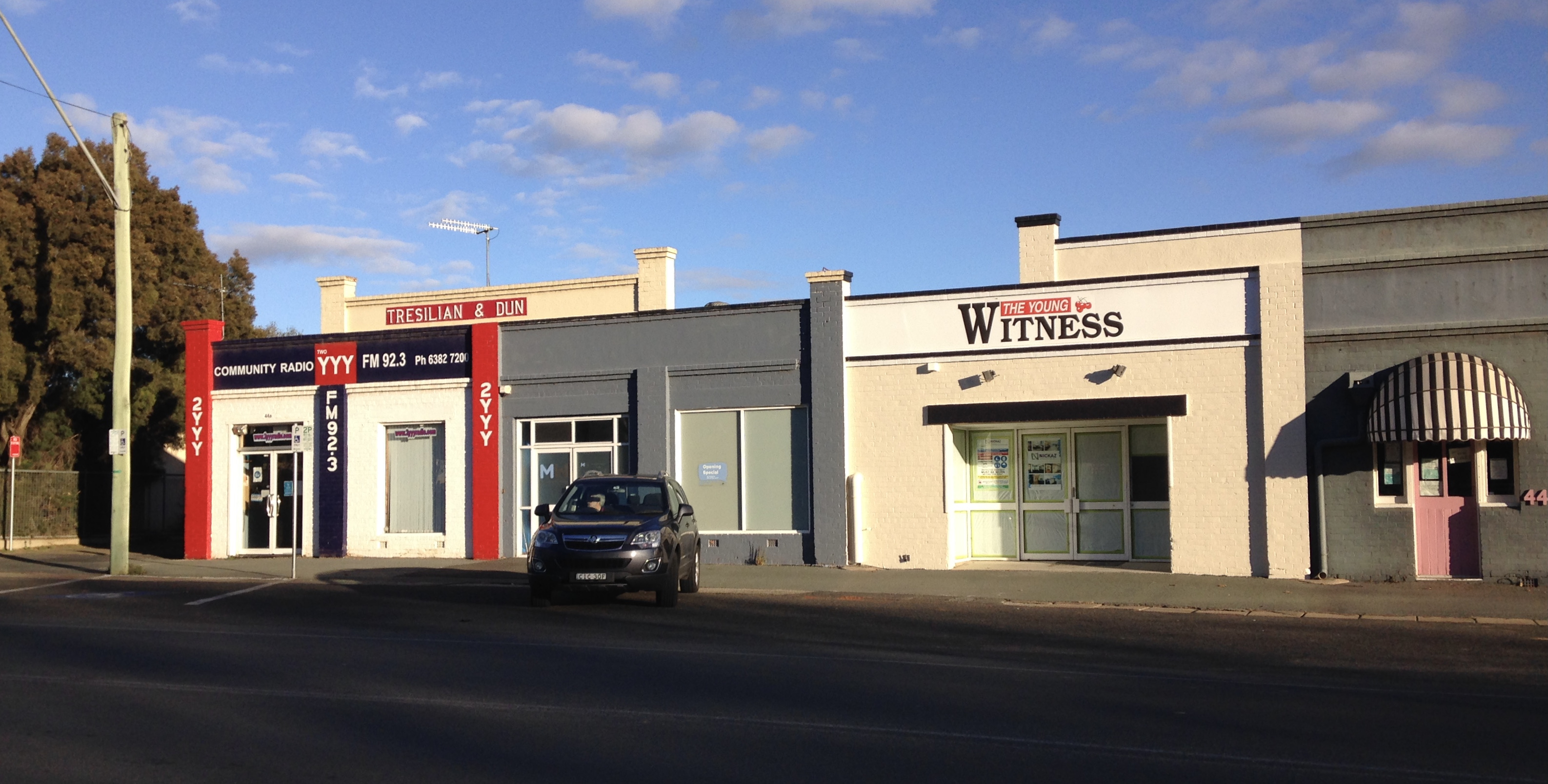
Community radio station & newspaper office side by side in regional (Young), New South Wales

Community broadcasting is Australia's third media sector, formally represented by the Community Broadcasting Association of Australia (CBAA). In January 2012, there were 359 licensed community radio stations (including remote indigenous services). A 2002 report found that 20,000 Australians (or 0.1 percent of the population) were involved as volunteers in the community radio sector on a regular basis, and volunteers account for more than $145 million in unpaid work each year. Nationally, more than 7 million Australians (or 45 percent of people over 15) listen to community radio each month.

The role of community broadcasting in Australia, according to CBAA, is to provide a diverse range of services meeting community needs in ways unmet by other sectors. Community broadcasting is sustained by the principles of access and participation, volunteerism, diversity, independence and locality.

Community radio stations may be specialized music stations, represent local music and arts or broadcast talks and current-affairs programs representing alternative, indigenous Australian, environmental, feminist or gay and lesbian interests (filling perceived gaps in commercial or government radio content). 53 percent of community radio stations serve an array of communities of interest, including indigenous and ethnic groups, people with a print disability, young people, older people, the arts/fine music, religious, and the gay and lesbian communities. The remaining stations provide a service which may be described as generalist: addressing the interests of communities in particular areas, but also addressing a range of specialized interests.

Community broadcasting, more than any other form of media in Australia, shapes and reflects the national character in all its diversity. The sector is unique in its capacity to provide fresh programming by and for indigenous, ethnic and RPH communities. Community broadcasting stations have a strong commitment to local news and information, the promotion of local and national music, arts and culture and providing training in media skills.

When a not-for-profit community group applies to the regulating body (the Australian Communications and Media Authority) for a community broadcasting licence, it specifies the community interest it intends to serve. Licensees are selected by the regulator on the basis of suitability and on the merits of the licence application and the capacity to serve identified community interests. Upon grant of a five-year renewable licence each station is required to continue to serve the community interest for which the licence was granted. The Broadcast Services Act establishes the requirement to continue to represent the licensed community of interest and the requirement to encourage participation from the licensed community of interest in the provision and selection of programs as key conditions of the licence. Provisions for Temporary Community Radio Licences in the Act allow, where spectrum is available, for aspirant community groups to develop their facilities and financial and programming models before the regulator considers making a permanent licence available.

=== Austria ===
In Austria, community radio was introduced in 1990 through a pirate radio movement. Regular licensed broadcasts began in 1998. Commercials are not permitted, so stations are primarily operated as non-profit NGOs. There are 14 community radio stations operating in the country.

=== Bangladesh ===
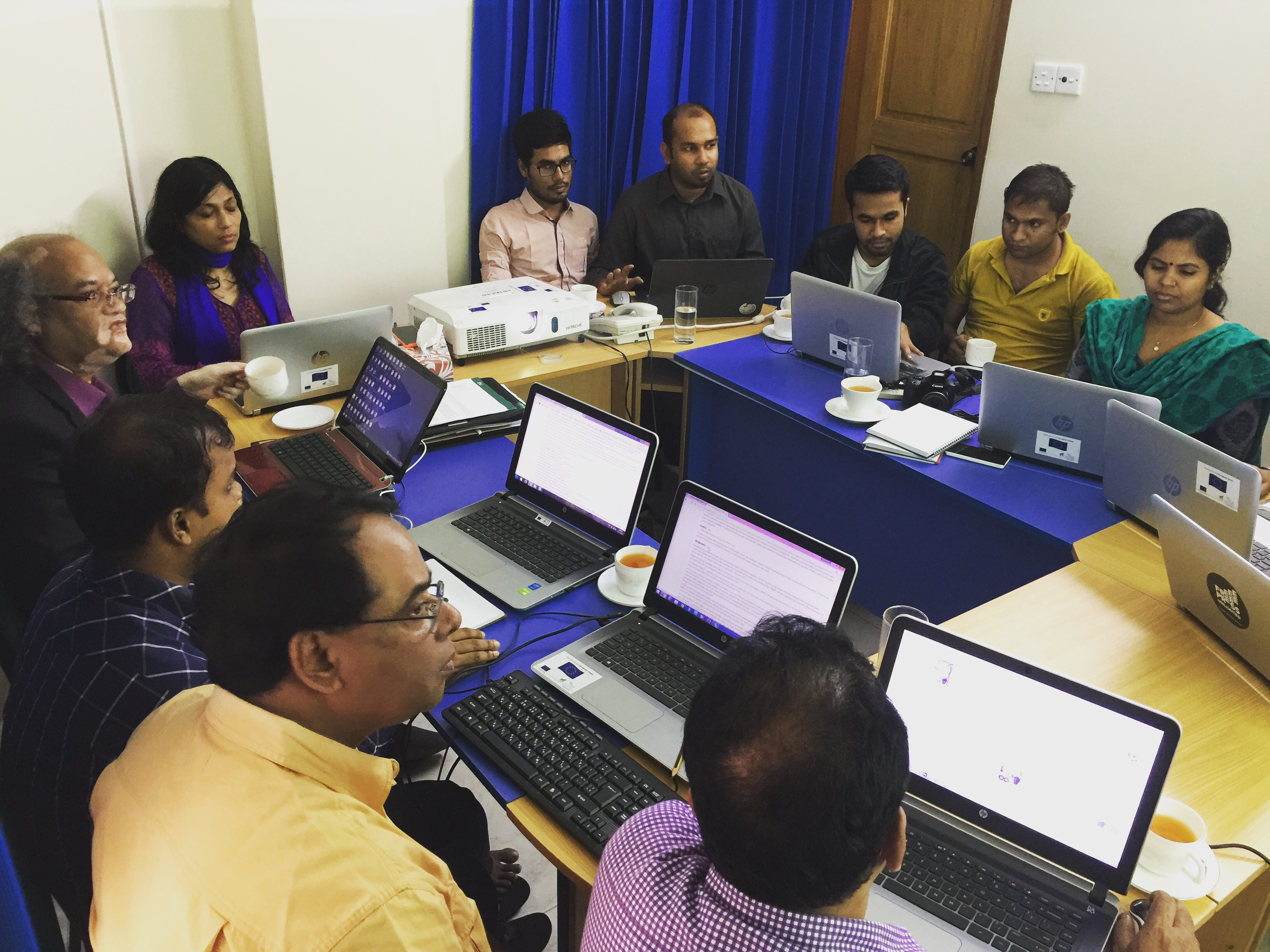
Workshop for Bangladesh NGOs Network for Radio and Communications staffs

Bangladesh NGOs Network for Radio and Communication (BNNRC) has been struggling for the last 12 years to open up the community media (including Community Radio, Community Television and Community film) and giving focus on its vital role as voices of the voiceless people. BNNRC has been addressing the community radio & community TV access issue for over a decade, almost since its emergence in the year 2000.

BNNRC is in special consultative status with the United Nations Economic and Social Council. BNNRC has been promoting advocacy to the government in relation to community radio with other organizations since its emergence in 2000.

The objective of BNNRC's Community Radio intervention is to address social issues (such as poverty and social exclusion) at the community level, empower marginalized rural groups and catalyze democratic processes and ongoing development efforts.

At the moment, positive and supportive condition is prevailing in our country. Because; Bangladesh Government has already acknowledged the importance of community radio and announced the Community Radio Installation, Broadcast and Operation Policy. Bangladesh is the 2nd country in South Asia in formulating policy for Community Radio. Now 14 community radio stations are on-air in the country, aiming to ensure empowerment and right to information for the rural community. They are broadcasting altogether 120 hours program per day on information, education, local entertainment and development motivation activities. Around 536 youth women and youth are now working with those Stations throughout the country as rural broadcasters.

The prime role of community radio is giving a voice to people who do not have access to mainstream media to express their views on community development. Promoting the right to communicate, expediting the process of informing the community, assisting the free flow of information and acting as a catalyst of change are major tasks achievable by community radio. It also upholds creative growth and democratic spirit at the community level.

As a result, the Ministry of Information of the People's Republic of Bangladesh announced the Community Radio Installation, Broadcast and Operation Policy 2008. Under this policy, the Ministry of Information approved 14 community radio stations for the first time in Bangladeshi history. To ensure the free flow of information to the people, the government enacted the Right to Information Act 2009. Community radio stations are a strong step in empowering rural people.

The reality of today is that the bondage between the community people and local-level community radio stations are getting strengthened day-by-day. Community Radio has now become their part of life. Community Radio becomes the instrument for the livelihood battle of the rural people.

BNNRC established the Community Media News Agency (CMNA), Community Media Academy (CMA) and Monthly Community Media to share development news and building capacity for the Community Media sector in Bangladesh. BNNRC now started advocacy with the Government of Bangladesh to open up community television for development.

Ministry of Information approved 17 community Radio in Bangladesh:

- Community Radio Sagor Giri 99.2 Young Power in Social Action (YPSA) for Sitakunda, Chittagong
- Community Radio Nalta 99.2 [Nalta Community Hospital (Satkhira)]
- Community Radio Mukti 99.2 [LDRO (Bogra)]
- Community Radio Pollikontho 99.2 [BRAC (Moulivi Bazer)]
- Barandro Community Radio 99.2 (Naogaon)
- Community Radio Mahananda 98.8 [Proyas (Chapai Nababgonj)]
- Community Radio Padma 99.2 [CCD (Rajshahi)]
- Community Radio Jhinuk 99.2 [Srizoni (Jhinaidhah)]
- Community Radio Bikrampur 99.2 [Ambala Foundation] (Munshiganj)
- Community Radio Lokobetar 99.2 [MMC (Barguna Sadar Upazila)]
- Community Radio Chilmari 99.2 [ Chilmari, RDRS (Kurigram)]
- Community Radio Sundarban 98.8 Koyra Upazila (Khulna)
- Community Radio Naf 99.2 Teknaf [ACLAB (Cox's Bazar District)
- Community Rural Radio 98.8 [Agriculture Information Services (AIS) Community Rural Radio (Barguna District)]
- Community Radio Meghna 90.0, Charfassion, Bhola [COAST Trust (Bhola District)
- Community Radio SagarDwip 99.2, Hatyia Island, [Dwip Unnayan Shongstha-DUS (Noakhali District)
- Community Radio Sarabela 98.8, ([SKS Foundation Gaibandha District)
- Community Radio Boral 99.2 (Bagha, Rajshahi District)

Earlier, in the 1st batch on 22 April 2010, Ministry of Information has approved 14 community radio stations, the number stands at 16 by adding more 2 stations in the line soon. 14 community radio stations ushered a new era by rural broadcasting 106 hours programs daily within a listeners' community of 4.6 million of 13 upazila of the country. These programs reflect the rights and scopes of the disadvantaged community people. This neo-media has produced a neo-generation of community radio broadcasters at rural level where a total of 536 youth and youth women are contributing creativity their time, effort and thus taking part in nation-building process. The initiating organizations received approval for primary set up of community radio stations in the 2nd phase are:

- Progati Research on Grassroots Ownership and Traditional Initiative for Shaymnagar Upazila, Satkhira District
- Aparajeyo Bangladesh for Pirganj Upazila, Rangpur District
- Bangla-German Sampreeti (BGS) for Tangail District, Tangail District
- SKS Foundation for Sader of Gaibandha District, Gaibandha District
- Voluntary Association for Rural Development (VARD) for Sunamganj District, Sunamganj District
- Somaj-O-Jati Gathan(SOJAG) for Dhamrai Upazila of Dhaka District, Dhaka District
- Shechashebi Bahumukhi Mahila Samajkallyan (SBSSS) for Boalia Upazila of Rajshahi District, Rajshahi District
- Jyoti Development Foundation for Sadar Upazila of Kushtia District, Kushtia District
- Institute of Development Affairs (IDEA) for South Surma, Sylhet District, Sylhet District
- Nazrul Smriti Sangsad (NSS) for Kalapara Upazila of Patuakhali District, Patuakhali District
- Karmojibi Nari for Bheramara Upazila of Kushtia District, Kushtia District
- Bandhan Society for Halimpur, Bajithpu Upazila, Kishoreganj District, Kishoreganj District
- Patuakhali Development Organization (PDO) for Bauphal Upazila of Patuakhali, Patuakhali
- Coastal Association for Social Transformation for Sadar Upazila of Cox's Bazer, Cox Bazer
- Program for Eco-Social Development (PESD) for Sherpur Upazila, of Bogra District, Bogra District
- Borendra Unnayan Prochasta for Sapura Upazila of Rajshahi

Bangladesh NGOs Network for Radio and Communication represents the community media sector to Government, Industry, Regulatory Bodies, Media and Development Partners in Bangladesh. The reality of today is that the bondage between the community people and local-level community radio stations are getting strengthened day-by-day. Community Radio has now become their part of life. Community Radio becomes the instrument for the livelihood battle of the rural people.

BNNRC has been struggling for the last 12 years to open up the community media (including Community Radio, Community Television and Community film) and giving focus on its vital role as voices of the voiceless people and has already established the Community Media News Agency (CMNA), Community Media Academy (CMA) and Monthly Community Media to share development news and building capacity for the Community Media sector in Bangladesh.

Community radio is considered an alternative, effective mass media for the rural disadvantaged population to express their thoughts in their own voice and their own style.

=== Benin ===
Radio is the primary mass medium in Benin and sub-Saharan Africa. Of its 55 radio stations, 36 are community stations with programming ranging from news and sports to music and quiz shows. Although there is a need for such stations, it is difficult for them to succeed due to financial and structural problems and a lack of funding.

=== Bolivia ===
A well-known example of community radio in Bolivia was the tin miners' radio. Funded by trade union dues and operated mainly at the local and regional level, there were more than 25 such radio stations between 1960 and 1985. Changes in government policy eliminated many unionised mining jobs after 1985 and some radio stations were sold or ceased to exist. In spite of many difficulties, five stations continue to broadcast.

La Voz del Minero, Radio Pío XII, RadioVanguardia de Colquiri, Radio Animas, Radio 21 de Diciembre, and Radio Nacional de Huanuni were some of the most important radio stations created, funded and managed by Bolivian mining workers. In 1949, a station began broadcasting in the mining district of Catavi. During the next 15 years, other districts followed; they bought the equipment, trained young people from their villages, and the workers funded the stations with a percentage of their salaries.

Most of the radio stations began small, with simple equipment. A few received foreign support and evolved into more sophisticated stations, with better equipment. Several built theatres next to their stations, so union meetings could be broadcast live; for example, Radio Vanguardia had a theatre decorated with large murals narrating the story of the Colquiri mining centre. One scene on a mural depicts the attack by Bolivian Air Force planes in 1967 (when the country was under military rule).

During the early 1970s 26 radio stations were in operation, all in the mining districts of the highlands. At the time, the miners' unions in Bolivia were still powerful and considered among the most politically advanced in Latin America. In times of peace and democracy the miners' radio stations were integrated into the daily life of the community, becoming an effective replacement for telephone and postal service. People would receive their mail through the stations and post messages, which were read several times during the day: calls for a meeting of women from the Comité de Amas de Casa (Housewives' Committee); messages from union leaders about their negotiations with the government in the capital; messages of love between young people; the announcement of a new play by the Nuevos Horizontes theater group (often staged on the platform of a big truck, with workers illuminating the scene with their own lamps); and announcements of sport activities, burials, births and festivities.

In times of political upheaval, the union radio stations would become the only trustworthy source of information. As the military captured newspapers, radio and TV stations in the capital and other cities, the only information available would come from the miners' radio stations. They would join the cadena minera ("mining chain") until the army penetrated the mining camps and mounted an assault on the stations, which were defended (sometimes to the death) by the workers. A film by Bolivian filmmaker Jorge Sanjinés, The Courage of the People, reenacts the attack on the mining district of Siglo XX by the army in June 1967. Another film, a documentary by Alfonso Gumucio Dagron and Eduardo Barrios entitled Voices of the Mine and produced by UNESCO, describes their political and social importance. The miners' radio stations would air reports on the political situation; they would also link for live transmissions when an important sporting or cultural event took place in the mining district. Other than that, each station was fully independent of the others.

The miners' radio stations were important because of the importance of mining in Bolivia; Bolivian miners were also influential because for several decades they had a powerful means to communicate their ideas. As the importance of mining in Bolivia declined during the 1980s, the unions were weakened and some of the radio stations disappeared (along with their mining districts).

=== Brazil ===
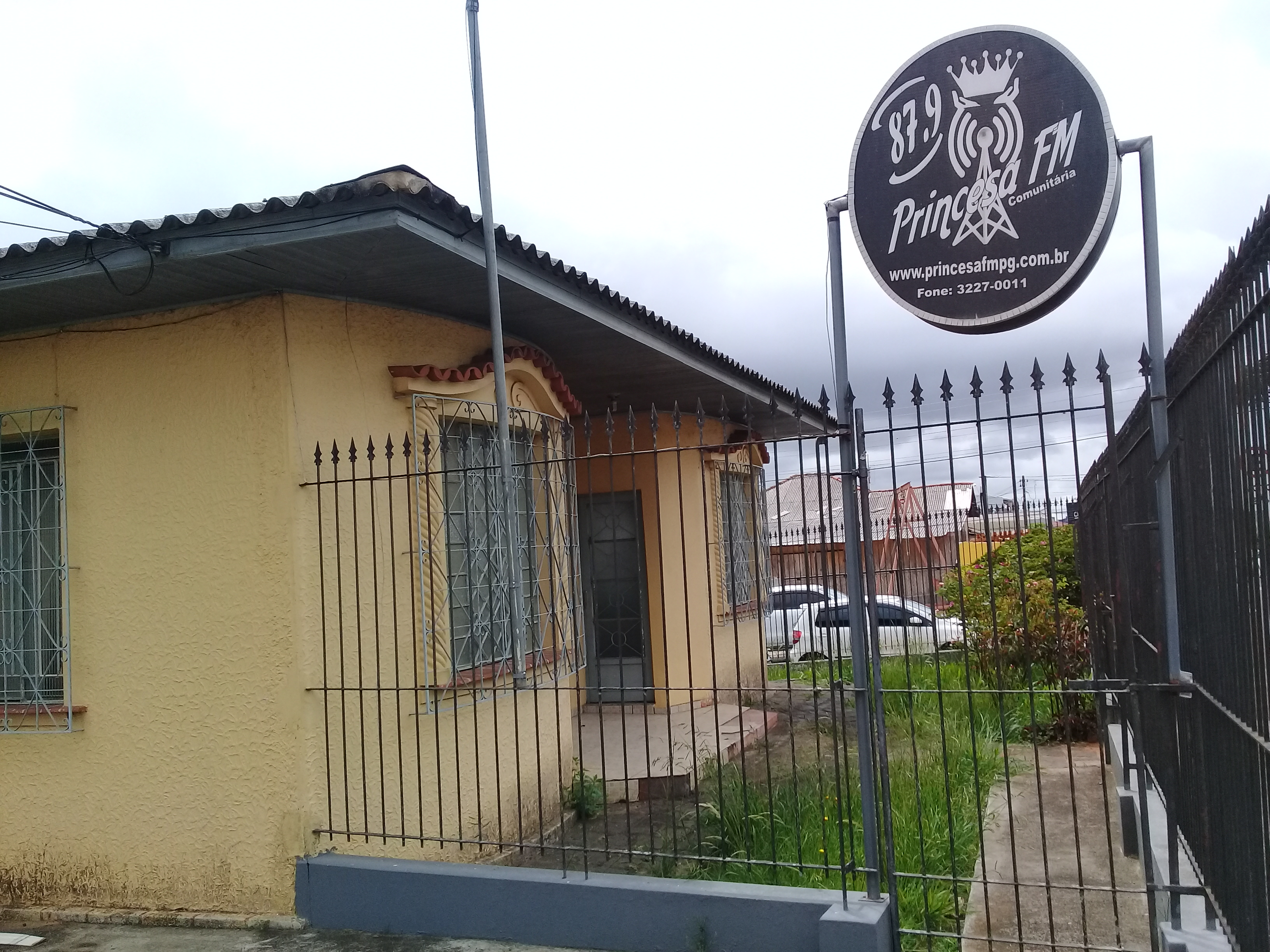
Princesa FM of Ponta Grossa, southern Brazil an example of CR. As indicated the frequency is 87.9 MHz, one of the most common tunings intended for this type of radio in this country.

Law No 9612/1998 defines a community radio station as sound stations belonging to non-profit foundations or associations representing a public contained therein, living in a neighborhood or united by a social cause and that the station presents itself as a spokesperson of these people. It has to operate with a maximum power of 25 watts ERP and its tower will have the limit of 30 meters (100'). These technical characteristics delineate a portion coverage of an urban area, a partial coverage in the municipality. As said, the community broadcaster has a cultural function, there can be no explicit commercial breaks but cultural supports of the content of the grid. Programming times can not be sold to third parties and broadcasting to other stations is prohibited (going against the idea of a "community radio").

They should be open to divergent opinions and divergent lifestyles regarding each of them. The average radius of reach is 1 km (1000 yards) (covering a village and a neighborhood in particular). The use for the ideological-political end or to present a specific belief is not allowed. An entity that has interest can send the documents to the Statement of Interest Register (CDI). The requests received appeared in the National Grant Plan (PNO), later a notice will be opened with the documents that should be sent. This does not mean that the institution has obtained the radio frequency, there will be a selection process to eliminate the competition. Even if after all it is authorized, it will have to be countersigned 90 days until the release of the National Congress, otherwise the applicant may require a provisional license.

The FM frequencies reserved for the service are 87.5 MHz, 87.7 MHz and 87.9 MHz, however, in some regions of Brazil, community radio stations are reserved in the frequencies 98.3 MHz, 104.9 MHz, 105.9 MHz, 106.3 MHz and 107.9 MHz. The frequency is reserved and licensed only by Anatel, the National Telecommunications Agency of Brazil. The history of the Brazilian community is inclusive in a context of Brazilian redemocratization in the second half of the 1980s. In the struggle to institute the same, a movement began in 1991, organizing itself in the form of a forum, in 1994 the judiciary legalized community radio broadcasts. The largest city in the country, São Paulo because of the lack of frequency, managed to regulate these radio stations only in 2007 through a public notice. Currently are about 34 stations of the genre operating only in 87.5 MHz (different from the frequencies commonly used).

On July 10, 2018, the Federal Senate Plenary approves the power increase from 25 watts to 150 watts, the effective half of a local commercial radio. The senator and author of the bill said it will improve coverage in rural areas where homes are more dispersed. However Anatel may interfere and determine the maximum power that can be transmitted, especially when there are adjacent CRs. The former minister Gilberto Kassab ordered to extinguish on the eve of 2019 more than 130 community radios for irregularities. Minas Gerais was the one that most lost emisoras (27) followed by São Paulo (20), another 22 states lost 1 CR for each one.

It is the most common type of radio broadcasting in Brazil. By 2014 there were 4641 broadcasters, 47% of all radios, being twice the commercial + educational FM and the triple of medium-wave broadcasters.

=== Canada ===
Community radio stations in Canada often target commercially underserved minority-language communities such as Franco-Ontarians, Acadians, Anglo-Quebecers or First Nations. These stations are often volunteer-run and operated by cooperatives or other not-for-profit corporations. In larger cities, community-oriented programming more commonly airs on campus radio stations, although some cities do have community radio stations as well. Most English-language community stations in Canada are members of the National Campus and Community Radio Association, or NCRA, while most of Canada's French language community radio stations are members of either the Association des radiodiffuseurs communautaires du Québec (ARCQ) or the Alliance des radios communautaires du Canada(ARC).

The province with the largest number of community radio stations in Canada is Saskatchewan. The majority of those stations are affiliated with Missinipi Broadcasting Corporation, an aboriginal public radio network. Community stations are subject to the Canadian Radio-television and Telecommunications Commission's (CRTC) community radio policy.

In this policy, the CRTC requires community stations to

- facilitate community access to programming;
- promote the availability of training throughout the community; and
- provide for the ongoing training and supervision of those within the community wishing to participate in programming.

It also requires stations to offer diverse programming that reflects the needs and interests of the community, including:

- music by new and local talent;
- music not generally broadcast by commercial stations;
- spoken word programming; and
- local information.

The CRTC maintains a list of community stations. In Canada, call letters and frequencies are regulated by Industry Canada's Spectrum Management.

The CRTC classifies community radio stations as one of two types, with slightly different regulatory requirements. Most stations are classified as "Type B"; however, a community radio station which operates as the sole local media service serving its community — such as an English language community radio station in Quebec, a First Nations radio station or a community radio station in a small town with no other local radio stations at all — is classified as "Type A", granting it a more flexible set of regulatory and license requirements to accommodate the wider range of community programming interests that such a station needs to serve.

=== Ecuador ===
In Ecuador, many community radio stations are operated by religious groups and include Catholic, Protestant and Baháʼí Faith stations. The amount of community participation and self-management varies. Radio Latacunga was associated with a project in which indigenous organizations were supplied with simple equipment to record weekly programs for broadcast in the early morning. Some indigenous groups operate their own radio stations; these include the Shuar Federation in the tropical rainforest, and the community of Simiatug in Bolívar Province. Unlike in Bolivia, trade-union radio has historically not been influential in Ecuador.

=== Ethiopia ===
Ministry of Communication and Information Technology (MCIT), Federal Republic of Ethiopia and World Development Foundation, New Delhi, India signed an agreement on 30 June 2014 for establishing seven Community Radio Stations at Finote Selam, Dilo (Borana), Adola Rede (Guji), Chewaka (Illubabor), Semera, Ari Woreda (Debub Omo) and Uba Debretsehay (in Gamo Gofa zone, Southern Nations, Nationalities and People Region), Ethiopia to serve as an avenue for the free flow of beneficial information aimed at uplifting the plight of the various sectors of the community. The stations were planned to open up possibilities for everyone, especially regular citizens, to express themselves socially, culturally, politically and spiritually, thus preparing each and every member of the community to participate in decision-making.

World Development Foundation, with an active support of different agencies of Government of India and Embassy of India in Ethiopia and especially HE Mr. Sanjay Verma, Ambassador and Mr. Vijay Kumar, Dr. Hari Om Srivastava and MCIT, Ethiopia was able to complete the job and hand over all the Community Radio Stations to MCIT in September 2015.

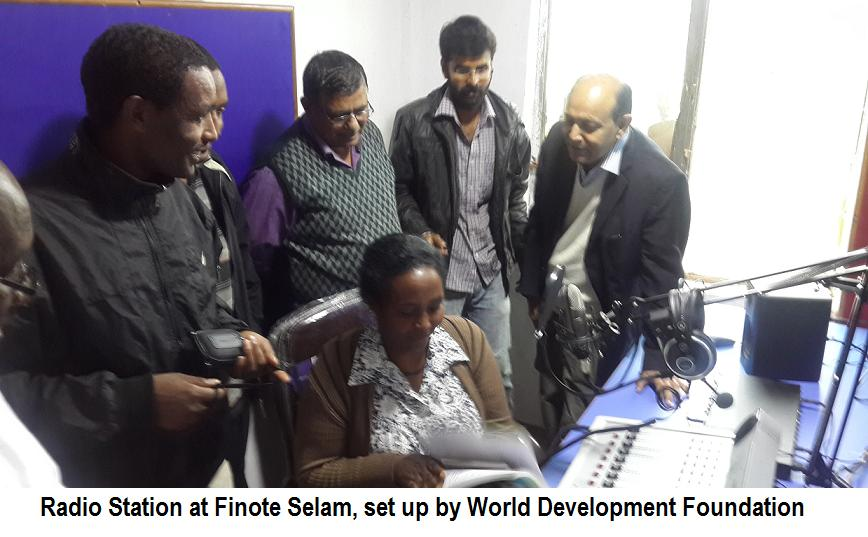
CRS at Finote Salem

Milestones

- Signing of Agreement: 30 June 2014
- Opening of Letter of Credit: 28 October 2014
- Dispatch of Material from India/USA/Italy/Spain: Between Dec2014 to Feb 2015.
- Receipt of material by MCIT and handing over to WDF for installation: June 2015
- Installation and Commissioning at seven sites by WDF and handing over to MCIT: 28 June 2015 to 5 September 2015
- Training of Officers/operational staff: 21 September 2015 to 25 September 2015

Highlights

- The emphasis has been on using type design for Lay Out, identical equipment and installation to ease the maintenance and procurement of spares. This will also allow the exchange of staff and development of expertise.
- The objective for training was to provide:
- full range of WDF accredited training on the usage of the equipment, hardware and software, programming including hands on training.
- simplified processes for equipment maintenance by the broadcaster's trainees in order to maintain the equipment's good working condition
- Programming basics and use of Community Radio Station for social, cultural, political and spiritual upliftment of people in the region
- Two local engineers were involved all through the installation.(Grateful to MCIT, Ethiopia)

Achievements Through its regular operations the community radio shall be able to:

- provide a development forum for the community;
- encourage participatory community development;
- promote active involvement of underprivileged groups such as women and young people;
- intensify the sharing of information within the community;
- encourage innovation in community development;
- increase the free flow of accurate and balanced information to, and within, the community;
- provide a forum for local cultural expression; and improve people's access to information in local languages

The Medication Foundation together with the Jimma Community and the Jimma University realized the first community radio station in Ethiopia in 2007. The Community radio station is located in Jimma University (in the south-west of Ethiopia).

=== Guatemala ===
- There are more than 100 community radio stations operating in Guatemala, but the indigenous communities don't have explicit rights to use radio frequencies, though their right to exist is guaranteed by the country's Peace Accords.
- Many believe the lack of support for community radio puts the volunteers in a very vulnerable position, and the law puts freedom of expression at risk.

=== Hungary ===
The first community stations began as pirates, broadcasting political free-speech and music programs after the change from socialism. Tilos Rádió in 1991 was the first such station, followed by Fiksz Rádió and Civil Rádió. Since 2004 a new category arose: kisközösségi (small community stations), which are low-power stations. By 2010, more than 70 such microstations have begun broadcasting throughout the country. There are village stations, small-town stations, university stations, subcultural and religious stations. In Budapest Cool FM, Első Pesti Egyetemi Rádió and Fúzió Rádió are small community stations.

=== India ===
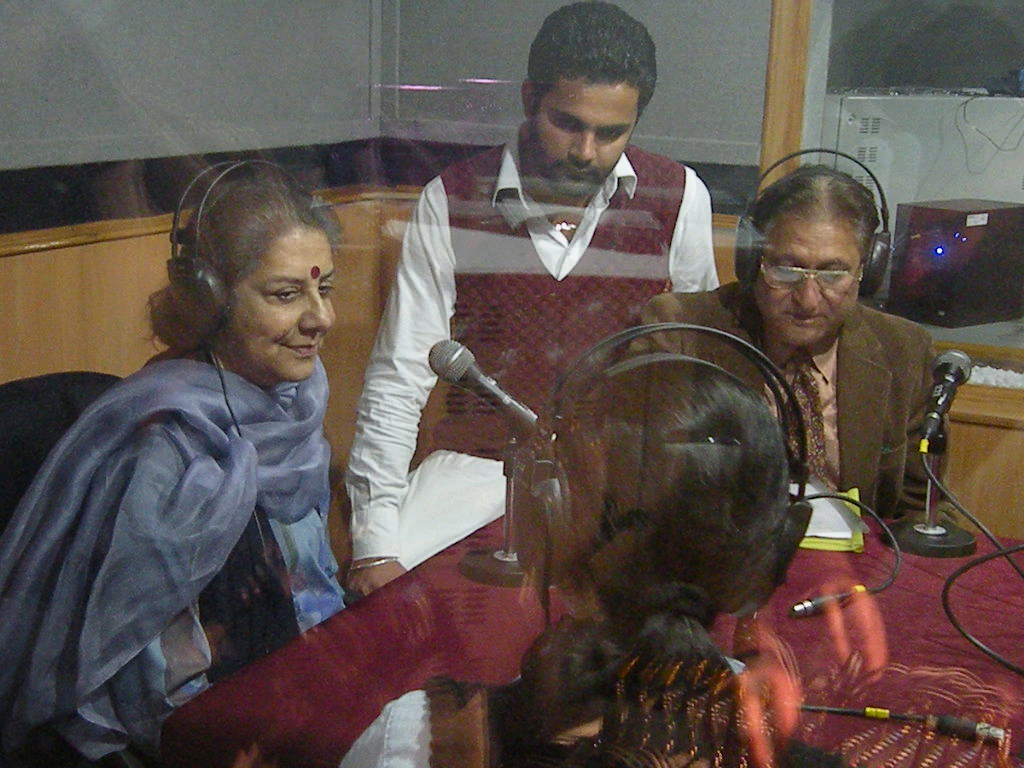
Union Minister for Information and Broadcasting, Mrs. Ambika Soni inaugurating the Community Radio Station, at Punjab University, in Chandigarh on February 13, 2011

In India the campaign to legitimise community radio began in the mid-1990s, soon after the Supreme Court of India ruled in its judgment of February 1995 that "airwaves are public property". The judgment inspired several free speech advocates, academics and community members across the country to being a concerted campaign to legitimize community radio in India.

In 1996, a Bangalore-based media advocacy group called VOICES organized a gathering of community radio stakeholders. A declaration calling for the establishment of a third tier of broadcasting, i.e., community broadcasting, was signed. A suggestion that AIR's local stations should allocate regular airtime for community broadcasting was put forward. Requests were also made for grant of licences to NGOs and other non-profit making groups for running community radio stations. Subsequently, UNESCO made available a portable production and transmission "briefcase radio station" kit to VOICES to do experimental broadcasts of programmes for a hands-on learning experience towards the objective of setting up an independently run community radio station.

A UNESCO sponsored workshop, hosted by an Andhra Pradesh NGO, Deccan Development Society (DDS) from July 17–20, 2000 in Hyderabad issued the 'Pastapur Initiative' on community radio that urged the government to take its intentions of freeing broadcasting from state monopoly to its logical conclusion, by making media space available not only to private players but also to communities. This landmark document urged the government to create a three-tier structure of broadcasting in India by adding non-profit community radio to the already existing state-owned public radio and private commercial radio.

Simultaneously, several initiatives had already started working on community radio in terms of production and dissemination of participatory programming. In South India, Deccan Development Society worked with Dalit women's collectives to start Sangam Radio, the programmes for which were made by the community, but were 'narrowcast', i.e. played back to the community over cassette players at group meetings. Another landmark initiative was jointly set up by VOICES and MYRADA - called Namma Dhwani (Our Voices), where programmes were produced by communities in and around the village of Budikote (about 100 kilometers; 60 miles from Bangalore), and were distributed over the nearest All India Radio station and subsequently over the local cable network. In the west, Kutch Mahila Vikas Sanghatan , a civil society group in Gujarat worked with the women in Kutch District to produce programmes on local developmental and cultural issues, and started broadcasting on the nearest All India Radio Station. In the northern part, Alternative for India Development made programmes with community members in Garhwa block of Jharkhand, and broadcast programmes over the Daltonganj All India Radio Station. Community Groups in Chamba, and Rudraprayag, both in Uttarakhand started producing participatory programmes and broadcast over the World Space Satellite Radio network. Kumaon Vani radio station was set up by The Energy and Resources Institute in March 2010 in Nainital district of Uttarakhand with the aim of bringing together communities across several villages in the Kumaon region. It was established to use radio as a tool to promote sustainable development among the local farming community. It broadcasts content that is relevant to the people of the area that is overlooked by commercial media.

By early 2003, the government of India released the first set of community radio guidelines drafted by Dr. Hari Om Srivastava and also the technology to be used , but unfortunately, restricted eligibility to educational institutions only. Marginalized and voiceless communities continued to remain outside the ambit of the then released community radio policy guidelines. Dr Sreedher Ramamurthy, the then Director of Audio visual Research centre at Anna University launched Anna FM as India's first campus "community" radio station. And, as per the latest Community Radio Policy Guidelines (2006), Anna FM falls well within the definition of Community Radio. Launched on 1 February 2004, it is presently run by the Department of Media Sciences, Anna university. Programmes are produced by students as well as community. Anna university station was launched on 1 February 2004 . Commonwealth of Learning and UNESCO sponsored an international meet on community radio at Anna university in December 2004 . All the applicants to CR in India as well as representatives from 13 countries attended. Government of India studied the working of this station along with the change of ruling party in India Several of the lessons learnt at Anna CR were incorporated in the Policy document in 2006. Practitioners and community radio advocates continued to push the government towards expanding the mandate of the community radio sector to include communities living in rural, remote and hilly areas of the country.

On 16 November 2006, the government of India implemented new Community Radio Guidelines, which permit NGOs, educational institutions and agricultural institutions to own and operate community radio stations. By 30 November 2008, there were 38 operational community radio stations in the country. Of these, two are run by NGOs and the rest by educational institutions.

The first community-based radio station licensed to an NGO (as distinct from campus-based radio) was launched on 15 October 2008, when Sangham Radio, licensed to Deccan Development Society, in Pastapur village, Medak district, Andhra Pradesh state went on the air at 11:00 am. Therefore, Sangham Radio, based on the policy guidelines, is second community radio station of India. Sangham Radio, which broadcasts on 90.4 MHz, is licensed to the Deccan Development Society (DDS) (an NGO which works with women's groups in approximately 75 villages in Andhra Pradesh). The community radio station is managed by "General" Narsamma and Algole Narsamma.

Under the 2006 community radio policy, any not-for-profit "legal entity"—except individuals, political parties (and their affiliates), criminal and banned organizations—can apply for a CR license. The licence entitles them to operate a 100-watt (Effective Radiated Power) radio station, with a coverage area of approximately a 12-km (7 mile) radius. A maximum antenna height of 30 meters is allowed. Community radio stations are expected to produce at least 50 percent of their programmes locally, as much as possible in the local language or dialect. The stress is on developmental programming, although there is no explicit ban on entertainment. News programmes are banned on community radio in India (as they are on commercial FM radio). However, the government has clarified that certain categories of news are permitted on radio, including sports news and commentaries, information on traffic and weather conditions, coverage of cultural events and festivals, information on academic events, public announcements pertaining to utilities such as electricity and the water supply, disaster warnings and health alerts. Five minutes of advertising per hour is allowed on community radio. Sponsored programs are not allowed, except when the program is sponsored by the government at the local or state level.

In a given license area, the Wireless Planning and Coordination (WPC) wing of the MoCIT reserves only three frequencies for community radio. This reservation is informally done and the WPC does not have any official communication or guidelines with respect to spectrum allocation for community radio in the FM band. The WPC follows a channel separation of 800 kHz in India. This means that if a radio station is allotted 90.4 MHz in a given license area, then the next available frequency is 91.2 MHz. Further, once a radio station is allotted a frequency by the WPC, that particular frequency is blocked for a radius of 100 kilometers (60 miles).

Activists and community workers from across the country have banded together under the aegis of the Community Radio Forum of India to coordinate training and support for community radio stations, and to work for a more proactive community radio policy. The Community Radio Forum, India, was registered as a Society and Trust on 26 February 2008. Members from the Community Radio Forum participate in screening committee meetings to screen potential applicants, and the organization is also recognized as a national level self-regulatory body in the Draft Broadcast Bill as published by the Government of India.

By 1 July 2010, the Ministry of Information and Broadcasting announced that 715 applications for CR licenses had been received, including 104 under the old campus-radio guidelines. 231 Letters of Intent were issued (including 63 under the old guidelines). Grant of Permission Agreements were signed with 102 applicants, and 68 community radio stations were on the air. 107 applications were rejected, and 377 applications were being processed. By 1 February 2012, the Ministry of Information and Broadcasting had received a total of 991 community radio licence applications. Grant of Permission Agreements had been signed with 161 applicants and 126 community radio stations were on air.

From April 1, 2012, the Ministry of Communications and IT has hiked the spectrum fees to Rs. 91,000 - a fivefold increase from the previous annual fee of Rs. 19,700. This move provoked widespread protest from functional community radio stations, advocacy bodies like Community Radio Forum and Community Radio Association of India, and even the Secretary, Ministry of Information and Broadcast has gone on record to say that his Ministry's views were not sought before the decision was taken. He also expressed concern that many organizations would find it impossible to pay the increased spectrum royalty charges. The Community Radio Forum has already boycotted one policy consultation held by the Ministry of Information and Broadcasting, on 9th and 10 May. Several community radio stations also observed a 'Day of Silence' on 9 May, where the spectrum fee hike was announced, protest songs were broadcast, community views were invited, and transmission was switched off for the rest of the day. After pressure from various stakeholders, the Ministry for Information and Communication Technology (MoCIT) announced that the spectrum fee and royalty charges would be rolled back to annual fee of Rs. 19,700. The spectrum fee was Rs. 19,700 annually, till September 2013, at which time the Ministry was to re-examine the matter.

According to the Ministry of Information and Broadcasting, Government of India, the status on 25 April 2023 of Community Radio in India was:

- No. of applications received so far, from 2004 to 05 Feb 2013 (including 104 under 2002 CR Guidelines): 1200(?)
- Letters of Intent (LOI) issued: 428
- Grant of Permission of Agreement (GOPA) signed: 191
- Operational Community Radio Stations: 420
- Number of applications rejected: 545
- Applications under process: 227

The complete list of operational community radio stations in India is published on the website of the Ministry of Information and Broadcasting. Additionally, Jose Jacob, of the National Institute of Amateur Radio in Hyderabad has also published a list of available stations.

To see details and descriptions on each of the individual operational community radio stations, the Ministry of Information and Broadcasting prepares a compendium on Community radio, which is also available and published on their website.

Community Radio and Commonwealth Educational Media Centre for Asia (CEMCA): from 2007 onwards, with CEMCA being the implementing agency and DR R Sreedher as its director, the Ministry of Information and Broadcasting, Government of India organized more than 40 awareness workshops throughout the country to create an atmosphere for getting more organisations to apply for a license for CR. By June 2012, the government had received more than one thousand applications and 400 of them got the Letters of intent LOI. While the initial phase saw more stations in educational campuses an analysis of the 400 LOIs brings out the fact that two thirds of the LOIs have gone to civil society organisations. They find it difficult to launch the station, due to lack of funds, training, human resources and the difficulty in getting the frequency cleared by the WPC wing of the Ministry of Telecommunications. In July 2014, Government of India announced a scheme to support community radio stations and allocated ₹100 crore for this purpose.

Community Radio Association Community Radio Association was formed soon after the first Sammelan of CR stations in 2011 in Delhi. 58 stations expressed their interest in April 2011 for the formation of an association, wherein people working on the ground, can represent their communities and bring the voices of the voiceless to the fore. A paper was prepared and circulated among operational stations and a consensus on the role of the association, its structure, objectives etc. were arrived at. A society was registered in Delhi in July 2011, under the Societies Registration Act.

The salient features of the CRA are:

- Only representatives of functional CR stations are its voting members
- It has been registered as an All India Body with 12 members from nine different states signing the MOA
- CRA works in a decentralized manner with Zonal and State Chapters. Each Chapter is empowered to organize workshops, events in line with CRA's objectives.

Even though CRA is only two years old its contribution and the role of its members in building an environment in favour of community Radio has been substantive.

CRA has been organizing events/workshops and has been sharing the experiences of its members across the globe. Some of its members have been representing the movement in international forums and reiterating the power of the Community radio. They have been supporting the growth of this movement in countries of both Europe and Africa.

Since CRA is a member-based organisation, all its members have been running community radio stations, in diverse regions and dialects, together they bring to the table a mine of resources and experience.

The strength of CRA is its network of experienced radio practitioners, who manifest the mandate of the Community Radio. This organisation is a true reflection of India's diversity, the multitude of languages and dialects, the varied topography and history. It is the only network in this sector, which is totally democratic and allows space for dissent, as there is nothing homogeneous about any community.

If we try to total up the experience of each member radio station- which are now 92 in all, then it would amount to a huge figure. The reach of this radio station together is to over 4 million people.

In 2013, CRA has organized two zonal workshops – South and West Zones and three state level experience sharing meets – Tamil Nadu, Maharashtra, Kerala. There have been workshops and meetings in all the zones, wherein members have come together and shared their challenges and achievements.

With a mission to promote, encourage, support and facilitate all functional and desirous Community Radio Stations in India and abroad, CRA has already hosted seven workshops for the Ministry of Information and Broadcasting. The seven Community Radio Awareness workshops were held at Dibrugarh, Ooty, Goa, Faridabad, Bhubaneswar, Kochi and Jaipur. The participation of the desirous Community Radio Operators was tremendous. The quality and content of the workshops was well thought out, and inspiring. Over 90 percent of the participants gave Letters of Intent on the last day.

CRA led the entire campaign against the rise in the licence fee. Members of the organisation met with the Minister, Mr Kapil Sibbal, personally and handed over the petition that was signed by all its members. CRA worked closely with CRF on this issue, and also organised a meeting with the then Minister of Information and Broadcasting, Ms Ambika Soni, who took up the issue of the hike in fees with the concerned department. Besides this:

- Members of CRA, have been part of the working paper on the Community Radio Support Fund, and contributed extensively to the process.
- CRA members are part of the screening committee for new stations.
- CRA Members are also part of the Technical committee for Community Radio Support Scheme (CRSS) and their suggestions and inputs have been considered valuable.
- CRA members were also the pioneers in developing a proposal for the incorporation of a Community Radio Peer Review to strengthen and support the operations of already existing community radio stations through cross learning and sharing. CRA member are also involved in the CR Policy review discussions.
- Individual members of CRA have worked in various capacities as facilitators, mentors, trainers for other organizations involved in the CR space namely, CEMCA, Ministry of Science and Technology, UNESCO.
- CRA is working on different training modules for capacity building in CR and disaster management, sustainability, knowledge sharing, mobilizing communities for health care, collaboration on non-formal learning and education programmes.
- CRA member stations have also won awards for their work in integrating technology with Community Radio and several ongoing research are being conducted on the same
- CRA member stations have been invited as speakers to several national and international forums like Bangladesh Community Radio Forum (25–27 February 2012), Asia-Pacific Institute for Broadcasting Development (AIBD) 2012, Asia Media Summit (29 May 2012), Cyprus Community Media Center, Nocosia (January 28, 2013, Radiodays Europe radio conference in Berlin 18–19 March 2013, International Association of Women in Radio and Television, seminar on Community Radio and Democracy in South Asia (5 March 2013)

==== Content Exchange and Knowledge Sharing for community radio ====
Indian government has been promoting content exchange especially radio programmes, good practices, case studies etc. to facilitate meaningful utilisation of available resources.

In past two years, Ministry of Information and Broadcasting has promoted EK duniya anEK awaaz (Edaa) - which is an audio and knowledge exchange portal for Community Radio practitioners in South Asia. Launched in year 2008, Edaa is completing 5 years on 1 September 2013.

Edaa is a web-based service that uploads the content of radio stations. Listening to Bhojpuri or Tamil from villages that don't appear even on Google maps, is such an exciting platform that even the ministry mentions this in its press release on future plans for Community Radio. Edaa is South Asia's biggest community-produced audio bank and hosts more than 2,900 radio programmes in 28 different South Asian languages categorised under 33 thematic areas. Another online space that supports learning and knowledge exchange between Community Radio stations in India is the Community Media Manch Platform This platform supports collaborations, knowledge sharing and webinars that community radio stations and members of community media can undertake to share their experiences.

=== Ireland ===
Ireland has had self-described community radio stations since the late 1970s, although it was not until 1995 that the first 11 licensed stations went on the air as part of an 18-month pilot project run by the Independent Radio and Television Commission. Early stations were represented by the National Association of Community-Radio Broadcasters, which in 1988 published a guide to setting up new stations.

There are 24 licensed stations in Ireland. In 2004 the licensed stations formed a co-operative CRAOL as a representative group in 2004, with the stations as shareholders. In 2007, new membership categories were created for aspiring stations, and a "Development Ladder" established to aid new stations in their development. By 2010, there were 42 aspiring stations at various stages of development. The Broadcasting Act 2009 provided a legal definition of community radio, which previously had been determined by the Community Radio Policy of the Broadcasting Commission of Ireland (now the Broadcasting Authority of Ireland). The Act also provided for the availability of a 100-day licence (within a 12-month period) for aspiring groups who meet the legal definition.

An Agreement for Mutual Co-operation was established in 2008 by CRAOL; this ensures that the signatories (which include all fully licensed stations) share successful funding applications, training materials and policies. This has led to a significant increase in networking and information-sharing. The agreement also covered the sharing of programming, and a network website facilitates these activities through a resource bank and online programme exchange.

Community radio stations in Ireland encompass stations serving a geographic community or a community of interest (such as campus stations, Christian and Irish-language stations). Accredited training in Community Radio has been available through CRAOL since 2004. The pace of such training has increased since mid-2009, with 95 percent of CRAOL member stations involved. In June 2010 the first Community Radio Conference was held in Croke Park, Dublin. Stations are located in all four provinces of Ireland; however, coverage is not universal. Dublin has the largest number of stations, and there are significant clusters in north and west Connaught and mid-Munster.

Community radio in Ireland encompasses:

- Process: Participation by communities in creation of programming
- Product: Service provided to the community through programming supplied

The combination of process and product is determined by the needs of the community, and implemented through a management structure controlled by the community.

=== Japan ===
Community radio stations in Japan are licensed by the Ministry of Internal Affairs and Communications. These stations provide information relevant to the local area and being useful as a lifeline during natural disasters. Their most common call sign is JOZZ-XXX-FM.

The first community radio station in Japan was FM Iruka in Hakodate, Hokkaido, opened in 1992. After the 1995 Great Hanshin earthquake, the number of community radio stations increased. As of December 2024, there are over 345 community radio stations in the country, with the highest number in Hokkaido (29 stations), Kanagawa Prefecture (18 stations) and Okinawa Prefecture (17 stations).

=== Jordan ===
The first community radio AmmanNet.net was established in 2000 in Jordan on the internet by award-winning Arab journalist Daoud Kuttab as a means of bypassing government restrictions on private, non-governmental radio. In 2005 AmmanNet was licensed as an FM private station in Jordan's capital, Amman. The radio paid US$30,000 for a licence. AmmanNet has also been involved in the training of two other community radio stations in Jordan: one in the twin villages of Lib and Mleih, and another as part of King Hussein University in the southern city of Ma'an. AmmanNet is also involved in training Arab media activists in internet radio. A program was begun to train personnel and launch nine Gulf-based radio stations as part of khaleejnet.net. In January 2008, the name of AmmanNet radio was changed to Al-Balad radio while AmmanNet.net remained as a news website.

Two other community radio stations have been established in Jordan. Yarmouk FM is located at Yarmouk University in Irbed as part of the school's Journalism and Mass Communications program. Farah FM is under construction, but has a license to broadcast in Amman and Zarqa (Jordan's second-largest city). This station will focus primarily on youth and women's issues.

=== Philippines ===
The best-known community radio network in the Philippines is Radyo Natin (Our Radio). Its stations nationwide broadcast a live Manila feed via satellite; sometimes stations air local programming, cutting the Manila feed. It is considered a community network, because local programs air on different RN stations. Radyo Natin is owned by the Manila Broadcasting Company.

Radyo Natin is the largest network of community radio stations in the Philippines, counting over 150 small FM stations throughout the archipelago from Batanes in the north to Tawi-Tawi in the south. RN stations are owned and operated by franchise holders, who are public-service-oriented communicators in their own right. With audio streaming, it is possible for the national feed to reach listeners all over the world via the internet; it is hoped that in the near future (as of 2011), the franchise stations will also be heard worldwide. Radyo Natin is able to reach audiences that have never been reached before by radio.

Although Radyo Natin is found in the FM band, in the mornings it affiliates with Manila Broadcasting Company's flagship station, DZRH, for national news programming. During the afternoons, Radyo Natin features popular music.

With its studios at the MBC Building in the Star City Complex in Pasay, Radyo Natin sends its signals to its stations by satellite. These stations, in turn, rebroadcast its signals locally. These individual Radyo Natin stations can, however, "unhook" from the Manila central studios and air events in their own areas at specified times; thus, Radyo Natin is nationwide in coverage but local in nature.

In 2005 a show-cause order containing a cease-and-desist directive from the commissioner of the National Telecommunications Commission was issued to Radyo Natin, forcing the closure of all stations. In the order against Manila Broadcasting Company, NTC Commissioner Ronald Olivar Solis said that the company is "operating a low power FM station as a commercial broadcasting station without the necessary authority from the Commission."

=== Nepal ===
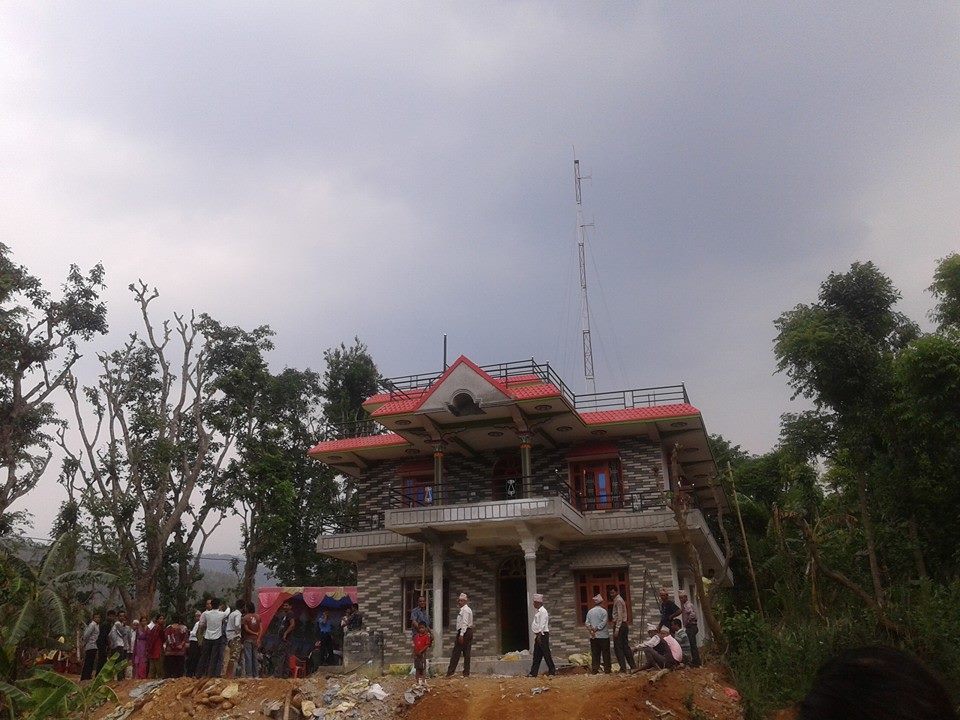
Radio Chapakot, a community radio of Nepal

Nepal adopted community radio in 1997 when Radio Sagarmatha (Sagarmatha is the Nepalese name for "Mount Everest"), broadcasting on 102.4 MHz, became the first independent public-interest broadcaster in South Asia. It was established by the Nepal Forum of Environmental Journalists (NEFEJ) in May of that year. Radio Sagarmatha is in the front lines of the fights for freedom of expression and the right to information of Nepalese citizens.

As of 2011, there are more than 150 community radio stations which have been licensed by the Nepalese government. In Nepal, there are no separate policies or laws for community radio. The existing policy applies to both community and commercial radio stations. Community radio stations have been petitioning the government to introduce different policy and law for community radio stations, whose mottoes are social change and social justice. They have played a role in restoring democracy and changing Nepal to a republic from a monarchy. The rule of law, gender equality, education, health, civics, anti-corruption initiatives, good governance, the environment and day-to-day problems and issues are examined in a different format by the local community radio stations. Community radio enjoys good coverage throughout Nepal, and news is one of its most popular formats. Its first Radio Producer/presenter was Mr. Ghamaraj Luitel, who served Radio Sagarmatha holding different positions in programme and top management for nearly one and one-half decades. He made Radio Sagarmatha very popular through unique radio programmes among its listeners during his 15 years service and left it after playing vital role to develop it as Station Manager for four years. Mr. Luitel led Radio Sagarmatha during the King Gyanendra's coup to save independent radio movement playing a role as central spokesperson after February 1, 2005.

Radio Sagarmatha's history is interwoven with the gradual loosening of government control over the airwaves in Nepal. From the time of the new constitution in November 1990, the drive to put the station on the air was instrumental in bringing about a new communications environment and a new awareness of the importance and need for independent, public-interest broadcasting.

Mass media in Nepal face barriers; the geography of the country is ill-suited to either mass-circulation print media or coverage by electronic media. Access to newspapers, radio, television and education is limited by poverty; Nepal has a low literacy level, particularly in rural areas and among women. Both print and electronic media are concentrated in urban centers like Kathmandu and are thought to have limited relevance for rural people.

In 1990, Nepal changed from a monarchical non-party system to a parliamentary model. A new constitution enshrined the right to freedom of expression (specifically, the right of every citizen to demand and receive information on any matter of public importance). The expression of basic communication rights in the constitution was followed by more focused policy and practical guidelines: in 1992, a National Communications Policy; in 1993, a National Broadcasting Act and in 1995, broadcast regulations.

Before 1994 radio broadcasting was the exclusive domain of Radio Nepal, the state broadcaster established during the early 1950s. Even after 1990, state governments were slow in relinquishing monopoly control of radio broadcasting. The first independent license was granted in 1997, four-and-a-half years after the initial application. The battle for this license was long, hard-fought and significant. The main obstacles were an unstable political environment, conservative politicians and bureaucrats disinclined to change and the monolithic presence of Radio Nepal. Between October 1992 (when the application was registered) and May 1997 (when the license was granted), Nepal had four different governments, four ministers and four secretaries of communication. Waged primarily by journalists committed to the cause of free expression and public-interest broadcasting, the fight involved figures of national prominence, professional associations, NGOs, the print media, foreign embassies, UN organizations, and INGOs.

From the outset the main organization vehicle for Radio Sagarmatha (for both the campaign to get a license and to establish a radio station) has been the Nepal Forum of Environmental Journalists, a non-governmental organization and association of journalists. Key international supporters during the establishment phase were UNESCO and DANIDA.

NEFEJ is the current license-holder of Radio Sagarmatha, although the station was officially a joint effort and partnership with three other media-based NGOs: the Himal Association, Worldview Nepal and the Nepal Press Institute. The station was headed by a seven-member board of directors, constituted by NEFEJ. Through NEFEJ bylaws, the board had representation from all four partner NGOs and met monthly to review and plan activities, set policy and provide direction for the station.

In April 1999, Radio Sagarmatha operated with the following staff: a station manager, six full-time producers, two technicians, a music librarian, an engineer, an accountant and an assistant. The station also benefited from the contributions and experience of international supporters. Volunteers are an important part of Radio Sagarmatha's programming and operation. The station's programming has given many people the opportunity to have their voices and opinions heard in a public forum. On a daily basis, the station takes listeners into everyday life. The variety of voices and sounds (and its less-than-state-of-the-art equipment) gives the station a different tone from other broadcasters in the region: one of real life, as lived and programmed by real people. Interviewees and those profiled on the station come from a variety of backgrounds and occupations.

Radio Sagarmatha works to present listeners with "a human package": a combination of issues and entertainment, social discussions and music, and a conduit for the variety of voices and opinion previously unheard on Nepal's radio channels. In its programming, the station's difference from the state broadcaster and the growing number of Western-style commercial stations is most evident. Public-affairs journalism and broadcasting are at the heart of Radio Sagarmatha's mission and vision for a more responsible press and a more pluralistic society. With a long tradition of folk media and a rich musical heritage, cultural programming is also prominent in the station's six-hour daily broadcast.

Other aspects of programming include an initiative named "Safa Radio: The Clean Air Campaign" in which the station works with the Nepal Environmental Scientific Society to measure air pollution in Kathmandu and broadcasts information about the capital's air quality. Though prohibited at first from broadcasting news, the station airs summaries of daily news stories in a format mixed with music and broadcasts daily community-news programs. Community access is an important part of programming. There is a daily feature, It's My Turn Now (in which individuals from the community voice their opinions), vox populi segments, listeners' letters and feedback recorded by telephone. In late 1998, Radio Sagarmatha formed a partnership with the BBC World Service; 30 minutes of the BBC Nepali service and 30 minutes of world news in English are heard in, respectively, the evening and morning programme blocks. A full list of stations can be found on the website of the Association of Community Radio Broadcasters Nepal.

=== New Zealand ===
The Association of Community Access Broadcasters (ACAB) is a group of 11 New Zealand community radio stations. The stations, established between 1981 and 2000 and receiving government funding since 1989, broadcast community programming and provide facilities, training and on-air time for individuals and community groups to produce the programming.

The ACAB group is a core component of New Zealand On Air's Community Broadcasting Strategy. A government funding pool of approximately $2 million is allocated annually for the 11 stations to produce programming for women, youth, children, ethnic and other minorities and people with disabilities in accordance with section 36(c) of the Broadcasting Act 1989. Individual station funding is allocated on a four-tier system based on audience reach, with each station receiving between $110,000 and $220,000. In return for government funding, ACAB stations have an individual and collective mandate to broadcast programmes for people of a wide range of particular religions, cultures, languages, ages and sexualities. Stations operate independently and locally, making decisions on programming and scheduling by consensus.

Prior to the commercial operations of Radio New Zealand being sold off by the Government in 1996, a number of smaller centres had a local RNZ station that was referred to as a community station.

=== Solomon Islands ===
The Solomon Islands have a number of community FM radio stations established under a United Nations Development Programme in Isabel Province. In March–June 2009 these were used to strengthen women and youth networking under a peace-building project of the Commonwealth of Learning. The stations are linked to rural email stations of the People First Network. The Don Bosco Technical School has also assisted the Tetere community in operating a radio station near Honiara, and the Solomon Islands Development Trust established a Community Media Centre to expand local capacity.

Soweto has only 1 Community Radio Station called Jozi Fm 105.80 FM. It first went on air in 1995 as Bua Community Station and it was later named Jozi Fm. It is now led by Mr Mpho Mhlongo who is a former presenter and one of the founders of the station.

=== South Africa ===
Shortly after the end of World War II, the country's repressive state policies gave the SABC (South African Broadcasting Corporation) an effective monopoly. For nearly half a century it was the only broadcaster permitted to operate, and faced no independent radio competition on South African territory until the early 1990s' transition to democracy. The first legally permitted, non-SABC broadcast was that of 1991's "Festival Radio" from the campus radio studios at Rhodes University in Grahamstown. An Independent Broadcast Authority was created to oversee the opening of the country's airwaves, with small community radio stations being permitted to broadcast for the first time. Applications were discussed in open session, to ensure transparency and accountability. Notable early community broadcasters included Bush Radio in Cape Town and Radio Unitra in Umtata. The Independent Communications Authority (ICASA) now regulates (as of 2011) the telecommunications and broadcasting sectors.

=== South Korea ===
The South Korean government licensed several low-power community radio stations in 2005. Maximum power is one watt, which covers 5 km (3 miles).

=== Sweden ===
In Sweden, community radio (Swedish: närradio) was introduced in 1978 with test transmissions; regular broadcasts began the following year. Commercials were not permitted until 1993, but stations are primarily operated as non-profit NGOs. There are 150 community radio stations in the country.

=== Syria ===
ARTA FM is the first community radio station in Syria broadcasting in three languages: Kurdish, Syriac and Arabic. It was established on 07.06.2013 in Amudah and it has offices in Amudah and Qamishli in Syria.

=== Thailand ===
Community radio in Thailand grew quickly during the government of Prime Minister Thaksin Shinawatra, taking advantage of a delay in the establishment of a regulatory authority. Thailand's 2,000 to 3,000 community radio stations (often operating unlicensed) have been accused of causing interference with air-traffic-control and other radio stations. However, selected community radio stations have been the target of police crackdowns, causing critics to accuse the government of political interference.

=== United Kingdom ===
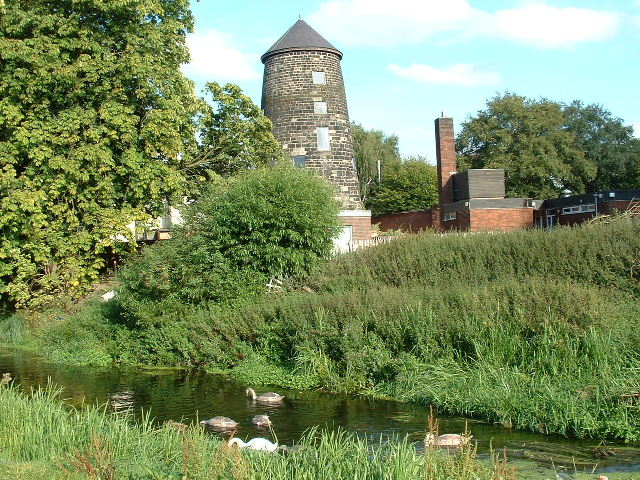
The Broad Eye Windmill, home of Windmill Broadcasting

In the UK, the idea of community-based services can be traced back at least as far as the original concept for BBC local radio in the early 1960s. Thereafter, various land-based unlicensed pirate radio stations (such as East London Radio and Radio AMY: Alternative Media for You) developed the idea further. As pirate stations proliferated during the late 1970s and early 1980s, these stations were joined by those broadcasting specifically to minority immigrant communities (such as the Afro-Caribbean and Asian communities, particularly in cities such as London, Birmingham, Bristol, Gloucester and Manchester). Although "community radio" remains synonymous with "pirate radio" for some people in the UK, most minority immigrant stations focused purely on specific musical genres and were operated (theoretically at least) on a for-profit basis. Community radio services in the UK are operated on a not-for-profit basis, with community ownership and control built into their structure.

Community radio stations were in operation on cable systems from 1978 onwards; mostly situated in new-town areas, they were operated by volunteers. Notable stations included Radio Thamesmead (later RTM Radio) in southeast London, one of the first cable radio stations in the UK, which began on the Rediffusion cable system in the southeast London area in 1978. During the late 1980s and early 1990s, the newly formed Radio Authority awarded licences (termed "Incremental" by the outgoing Independent Broadcasting Authority) to a number of new, ex-pirate and cable-based community ventures. The old breed of community radio stations could raise funds by selling airtime and by receiving donations or grants.

Following an experiment of Access Radio licensed by the former UK broadcast regulator the Radio Authority, legislation was brought to create a new tier of community radio regulated by the RA's successor OFCOM. The first station to go on air under this new scheme was 103 The Eye which launched on 1 November 2005, serving the Vale of Belvoir on the Leicestershire/Nottinghamshire border on 103 FM and on the internet. Since 2005 some 300 such stations have been licensed by broadcasting regulator Ofcom operating on five-year licences with the opportunity to renew at the end of each term. Most community radio stations in the UK are on FM, typically at a power of 25 watts. FM community radio stations include Andover Radio, Cambridge 105, Chiltern Voice FM, Preston FM and Penistone FM. A few community radio stations broadcast on AM (medium wave), particularly in rural areas, and some operate online, like Windmill Broadcasting, the UK's only radio station broadcasting from a Windmill, in the Broad Eye Windmill, Stafford.

With the introduction of SS-DAB (small-scale Digital Audio Broadcasting licences) from Ofcom, a new breed of community radio stations will launch on DAB in towns and cities around the UK. Stations, such as Blyth's South Beach Radio are piloting their formats with web streams in preparation for a DAB launch when the licences become available.

=== United States ===
In the United States, community radio stations are non-profit, community-based operations licensed by the Federal Communications Commission. These stations differ from other public radio outlets in the U.S. by allowing community volunteers to actively participate as program hosts.

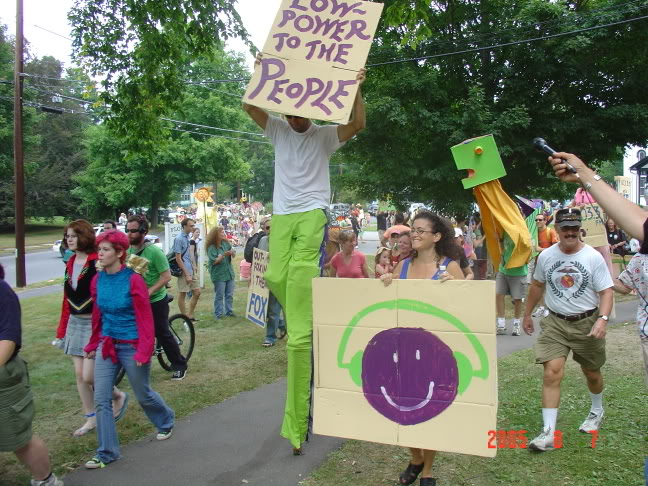
Parade at the launch of WXOJ-LP, Valley Free Radio, in Northampton, Massachusetts in August 2005

Most community stations are licensed by the Federal Communications Commission (FCC) as full-power FM stations, while others, particularly those founded after 2005, operate under the FCC's low-power broadcasting rules. Many of the former were founded in the 1960s and 1970s when cultural experimentation (such as the New Left) in the U.S. had a significant following, including those influenced by the philosophy of radio activist Lorenzo Milam. Community radio stations are usually owned by non-profit organizations led by boards of directors and often managed by paid staff who are responsible for business operations and volunteer coordination. Community radio programming involving local volunteers also is offered as part of student-run stations at colleges, universities, and in some cases, high schools.

The National Federation of Community Broadcasters was formed in 1975 as a membership organization for community stations. NFCB publishes handbooks for stations, hosts an annual conference and lobbies on behalf of community radio at the federal level. It was criticized in the 1990s for perceptions it advocated homogenization of programming. The organization has changed leadership since this period. The Grassroots Radio Coalition is a loose network of stations which formed as a reaction against increasing commercialization of public radio and lack of support for volunteer-based stations.

Community radio stations generally have smaller budgets than National Public Radio (NPR) network outlets, due to the smaller audiences attracted by their diversified programming and in turn, a smaller base of listener and business support. Community stations are distinct from NPR stations in that most programming is locally produced by non-professional disc jockeys and producers, whereas traditional public stations rely on national outlets, such as NPR and PRI, for most of their programming. However, some community stations, such as KVNF in Colorado, WMNF in Florida, and WDIY in Pennsylvania, carry NPR in addition to their volunteer-based local origination programming.

== UNESCO ==
UNESCO is a strong supporter of community radio and works to increase the viability of local radio stations around the world. In 2001, the Media Development and Society Section produced the "Community Radio Handbook" to share best practices collected through the Organization's involvement in the sector. This handbook specifically gives recommendations to radio station personnel in how to engage listeners in democratic debate as a means to forward community development.

The Organization has also supported community radio through the direct training of radio station staff. The "Empowering Local Radio with ICTs" project strengthened the reporting capacities of 59 local radio stations from 2012 to 2018. This UNESCO project was implemented in 10 countries of Sub-Saharan Africa, including Burundi, the Democratic Republic of the Congo, Kenya, Lesotho, Namibia, Rwanda, South Africa, Tanzania, Uganda and Zambia. Workshops focused on improving the quality of broadcasts, building widespread correspondent networks and promoting sustainability.

Gender sensitivity training was another important aspect of the project, with many of the best stories pertaining to gender issues being amalgamated in the "On air with rural women" exhibition, opening the celebrations for International Women's Day 2018 and being showcased at the 2018 European Development Days.

== International ==
The worldwide association for free radios is the World Association of Community Radio Broadcasters (AMARC).

== Research on Community Radio ==
While the causal effects of media in general are well understood, fewer papers have rigorously examined the effects of community radio explicitly. From a political science perspective, a 2011 paper studies how local politicians can capture community radio stations in Brazil to entrench their local power. Another paper on Burkina Faso studies whether the presence of community radio increases politicians' responsiveness to citizens. It finds that while an increasing number of community radio stations increases the demand for education through private institutions, it does not increase the provision of public schools. Moving to social outcomes, a 2025 study investigates the effects of India's 2006 community radio policy on women's empowerment. It shows that the around 300 radio stations that had launched by 2020 strongly focus on women's empowerment and education. It further shows effects of community radio on girls' education, child marriage rates, and fertility.

== See also ==
- Campus radio
- International Freedom of Expression Exchange
- World Association of Community Radio Broadcasters (AMARC)
- CRAOL (Community Radio Forum of Ireland - Irish Sector Body)
- Community Media Association (UK Sector Body)
- Prometheus Radio Project
- Bangladesh NGOs Network for Radio and Communication (Bangladesh Sector Body)
- List of Community Radio Stations in the United States
- National Federation of Community Broadcasters (US association)
