= FRN =

FRN may refer to:

- IATA code for Bryant Army Heliport, Alaska, U.S.
- Station code for Fearn railway station, Scotland
- Federal Reserve Note, a United States banknote
- Feminist Radio Network, a United States radio distribution network
- TSX stock market code for Feronia Inc., a DR Congo palm oil corporation
- ICAO code for First Nation Airways, Nigeria
- Floating rate note, bonds that have a variable coupon
- Postal code for Floriana, Malta
- Food Recovery Network, a U.S. student movement
- FoodRoutes Network, a U.S. sustainable agriculture group
- National Reconstruction Front (French: Front pour la Reconstruction Nationale), a political party in Haiti
- National Renaissance Front (Romanian: Frontul Renașterii Naționale), a defunct political party in Romania
- National Revolutionary Front (French: Front révolutionnaire national), a political party in Vichy France
- FCC Registration Number, and entity identifier for the FCC Universal Licensing System (ULS)
- Federal Republic of Nigeria
