= KKFI =

Kansas City, Missouri; United States
- Broadcast area: Kansas City metropolitan area
- Frequency: 90.1 MHz

Programming
- Format: Free-form radio
- Affiliations: Pacifica radio

Ownership
- Owner: Mid-Coast Radio Project, Inc.

History
- First air date: 1988

Technical information
- Licensing authority: FCC
- Facility ID: 41857
- Class: C1
- ERP: 100,000 watts
- HAAT: 129 meters (423 ft)
- Transmitter coordinates: 39°5′5.0″N 94°28′47.8″W

Links
- Public license information: Public file; LMS
- Webcast: Listen live
- Website: kkfi.org

KKFI (90.1 FM) is a 501(c)(3) nonprofit radio station, located in Kansas City, Missouri, owned by Mid-Coast Radio Project, Inc. The station features a free-form radio format, including a mix of music (blues, jazz, reggae, rock, hip-hop, alternative, Hispanic and world music), public affairs and talk programming (featuring topics such as the working class, organized labor, peace, justice, LGBTQ+, women, and alternative health issues). KKFI's studios are located on Main Street in Kansas City.

Formed in 1988, it broadcasts at 100,000 watts. Its service area is roughly circular and encompasses the Kansas City metropolitan area.

== History ==
KKFI was inspired by the 1971 book Sex and Broadcasting. It is owned and operated by Mid-Coast Radio Project, Inc., incorporated on March 25, 1977. It received a license to broadcast in 1987. Its first broadcast was on February 28, 1988.

Former logo

== Affiliations ==
KKFI is affiliated with Pacifica radio, the National Federation of Community Broadcasters, and the Grassroots Radio Coalition. It's the Kansas City metropolitan area's home for Democracy Now!, the flagship program of Pacifica radio.

== See also ==
- List of community radio stations in the United States
- List of Pacifica Radio stations and affiliates
