= Broad Eye Windmill =

Windmill in Stafford, Staffordshire, England

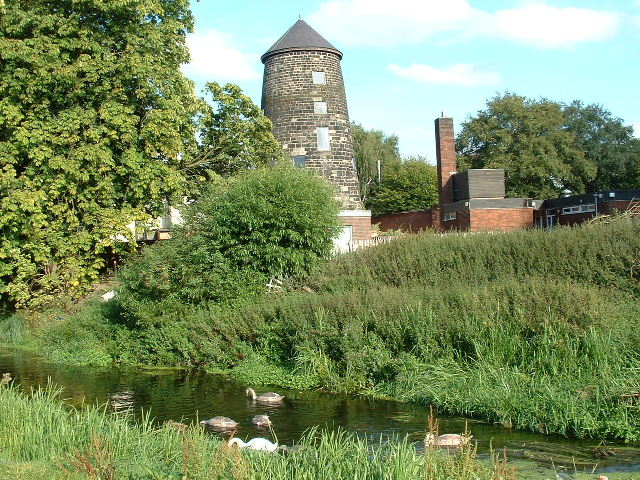
- Broad Eye Windmill with the River Sow

- Location within Staffordshire

General information
- Architectural style: Windmill
- Location: Stafford, Staffordshire, West Midlands, England
- Coordinates: 52.807094°N 2.122786°W
- Completed: 1796

The Broad Eye Windmill is an historic windmill in the county town of Stafford, Staffordshire, England. The windmill is currently home to Windmill Broadcasting, and is looked after by the Friends of Broad Eye Windmill.

It operated as a mill for 100 years, with the sails being removed in 1897. Over the next 100 or so years, numerous businesses operated from the Broad Eye Windmill, including a butchers.

The patron of the Broad Eye Windmill is actor, TV presenter and historian Tony Robinson.

== History ==
=== 18th century ===
Despite the town having three water mills, not enough flour could be produced to feed the poor of Stafford, as large amounts were being shipped to Birmingham via the Staffordshire and Worcestershire Canal, built in 1772 at Radford Bank. Furthermore, high prices were being charged by the water mills, as a result of the corn laws which allowed farmers and millers to charge high prices for grain and flour. This meant local people went hungry, and, to get around this problem, work started on the Broad Eye Windmill in 1796, which was completed in the early 1800s. Allotment land was made available at Broad Eye for the project, which is one of the lowest lying areas of Stafford Borough, sited next to the River Sow.

Using stone from the early Shire Hall, in its day, at a height of sixty three feet, the windmill was the highest in the Midlands and originally had a conical cap and seven floors, of which only the upper four floors were used for flour production.

=== 19th century ===
In 1835, to keep up with demand, a steam engine was placed in the lower floors to keep up production when the wind wasn't blowing. However, this only partly rectified the situation, as when the mainline railway arrived in 1837, flour production could not keep up with local demand - Stafford was growing so quickly, and with new rail links, it was possible to bring in cheap flour, which meant the mill could not compete. Furthermore, due to the demand for finer, white flour which could not be produced at the Broad Eye Windmill, by 1896, the mill reached the end of its life in its intended form, and in the following year, in 1897, the sails and winding gear were removed.

=== 20th century ===
In 1919, the lower part of the windmill was converted into a shop, and, from the early 1920s until 1931, it was trading as a butcher’s shop. Photographs of the windmill's time as a shop still remain. American troops used the mill as a wartime store place but it later fell derelict, before being declared a Grade II listed building in 1951.

== Present day ==
In 1966, the Friends of Broad Eye Windmill was created to look after the mill with the idea of returning it to its former glory, whilst establishing a heritage and education centre within. They aim to renew damaged oak support beams, Joists and floorboards so the next storey can be used as a museum and heritage centre. Inside the windmill lie artifacts and photographs relating to the Windmill and Stafford's industrial past. Currently, only the ground floor and basement are accessible.

The Friends of Broad Eye Windmill frequently hold open days throughout the summer, to give people an idea of what the Mill's interior is like, and to raise awareness of the renovation of the windmill. Donations towards the Windmill are always being collected, which goes towards the renovation and preservation of the Broad Eye Windmill.

== Windmill Broadcasting ==
In 2016, Windmill Broadcasting, a local community radio station, started broadcasting from the Broad Eye Windmill. As well as being based in the Mill, the station works with the windmill members to assist with fundraising and renovation, and to help promote the windmill.

== See also ==
- List of windmills in Staffordshire
- Listed buildings in Stafford (Outer Area)
