= WTSQ-LP =

- Charleston, West Virginia; United States
- Broadcast area: Metro Charleston
- Frequency: 88.1 MHz
- Branding: 88.1 WTSQ

Programming
- Format: Eclectic Freeform

Ownership
- Owner: Masque Informed

History
- First air date: June 14, 2015
- Call sign meaning: The Status Quo

Technical information
- Licensing authority: FCC
- Facility ID: 194844
- Class: L1
- ERP: 100 watts
- HAAT: −26 meters (−85 ft)
- Transmitter coordinates: 38°20′54.0″N 81°38′15.0″W

Links
- Public license information: LMS
- Webcast: WTSQ-LP Webstream
- Website: WTSQ-LP Online

WTSQ-LP 88.1 FM is an independent community radio station based in Charleston, West Virginia. It specializes in alternative and indie while offering a diverse mix of genres and styles. Its broadcasting license is owned by Masque Informed, an independent 501(c)(3) organization and is operated by community volunteers. The station broadcasts locally on 88.1 FM and streams worldwide via its website and mobile app.

== History ==
WTSQ began broadcasting with a soft launch on June 14, 2015, and officially launched on July 11, 2015, from The Union Building in Charleston. The station later relocated to The People's Building on Summers Street in 2022. Despite the move, WTSQ has maintained 24/7 broadcasting with minimal downtime. It also hosted the 2023 Grassroots Radio Conference, bringing together community radio stations from across the country.

== Programming ==
WTSQ features a freeform mix of music and talk programming, including genres such as doo-wop, hip-hop, funk, punk, reggae, dub, metal, folk, Americana, alternative, and indie rock. Notable shows include:

- Morning's with Lou (Weekdays 7 AM - 9 AM)
- Democracy Now! (Weekdays 9 AM - 10 AM)
- Morning Mix with Mya (Weekdays 10 AM - Noon)
- The Afternoon Show with Josh Gaffin

WTSQ also runs CharlesTunes, a secondary streaming channel that features local and regional artists, as well as community-created podcasts.

Nearly 40 DJs make up the weekly programming schedule, each hosting a weekly on-air shift that covers late afternoons and evenings Monday - Friday, as well as morning, afternoon, and evening shifts on Saturdays & Sundays. The station also relies on DJ OTTO, its custom-made automation system. Additionally, WTSQ features National Weather Service reports, participates in Emergency Alert System, and broadcasts current news updates from Feature Story News service Monday - Friday.

== Community Engagement ==
WTSQ actively participates in the Charleston music and arts scene. It has hosted anniversary parties at unique locations featuring artists such as Ron Gallo, Screaming Females, and Bodega. The station has also provided live coverage for Live on the Levee and continues to support local events.

WTSQ often features local artists, musicians, and community figures on-air to discuss local events and news. The station also provides several field reports from downtown Charleston and live broadcasts from community events such as ArtWalk, FestivALL, and Regatta.

== Technology and Streaming ==
The WTSQ mobile app has been completely reworked, now supporting both Apple CarPlay and Android Auto, as well as Apple TV and Android TV. The app is available for tablets and mobile devices, remaining free and ad-free. Listeners can search for "WTSQ" in their app store to download it.

WTSQ is also in the process of launching an improved WTSQ 88.1 FM stream, which will significantly enhance audio quality and fidelity.

== Financing and Sustainability ==
WTSQ's operations and programming cost nearly $45,000 annually. The station is primarily community-funded, with occasional grants supporting new projects like antenna relocation, CharlesTunes, and the Podcast Studio. However, sustaining 24/7 operations for over a decade has relied almost entirely on community support. Donations during the annual Spring fund drive, community business underwriting, and the Fall monthly membership drive are crucial to keeping WTSQ on the air. The station would not exist without this financial support.
