= Josh Gaffin =

American radio personality

- Born: New York City, U.S.
- Occupation: Radio personality
- Years active: 1980s–present
- Employer: WTSQ-LP
- Known for: Host and producer of The Afternoon Show

Josh Gaffin is an American radio personality. He is the host and producer of The Afternoon Show on WTSQ-LP 88.1FM Charleston, West Virginia.

Gaffin was born and raised in New York City, having grown up in both Brooklyn and Greenwich Village. He is the stepson of Village Voice journalist and anti-nuclear activist Anna Mayo and cousin of Broadway stage manager Artie Gaffin.

== Music and television career ==
At the age of 17, Gaffin became the music director for Radio Newyork International (RNI), a pirate radio station which broadcast from a ship anchored in international waters off Jones Beach, New York. Gaffin began to receive public attention following the infamous FCC raid on RNI's ship in 1987. He appeared on MTV as a guest VJ and was featured as a special guest on episode 141 of Rapid T. Rabbit and Friends.

As a teenager, Gaffin worked for Celluloid Records and Rough Trade Records. He also worked on and appeared in the Public-access television show Rapid T. Rabbit and Friends. At 17, Gaffin started an internship at Virgin Records and was hired following his 18th birthday.

Gaffin worked as a personal assistant to Lou Reed. He later worked for Los Angeles-based Frontier Records.

Gaffin currently works at WCHS-TV and WVAH-TV. He hosts The Afternoon Show on WTSQ-LP and is known for his unique style of interviewing, eclectic playlists, and extensive musical knowledge.

== Appearances ==
Gaffin is thanked in the liner notes of the Velvet Underground's Live MCMXCIII. Photos taken by JJ Gonson of Gaffin with musicians Elliott Smith, Tony Lash, and fellow Heatmiser bandmates appeared in the Elliott Smith: The Portland Years photo show and series.

In April 2016, Gaffin appeared as the special guest on episode 032 of The Real with Mark Wolfe podcast. He was featured as a model in a life-size photographic installation of Charleston, West Virginia residents as part of the town's 2016 FestivALL. He appeared as a featured artist speaker on Three Things at the Albans Art Center on November 3, 2016. Gaffin portrayed the role of Jacob, a Jewish survivor of the Holocaust, in a 2017 production of Calvin Alexander Ramsey's play, The Green Book: A Play in Two Acts, based on the Negro Motorist Green Book.
