= NFCB =

NFCB may refer to:

- National Federation of Community Broadcasters in the United States
- National Financial Credit Bank in Cameroon
