= National Institute of Amateur Radio =

Indian amateur radio organization

- Abbreviation: NIAR
- Type: Amateur radio club
- Headquarters: Hyderabad, Telangana, India

The National Institute of Amateur Radio is an amateur radio club based in Hyderabad, Telangana in India. It works to increase awareness on amateur radio. It was founded in 1983.
