= Solomon Islands Development Trust =

- Formation: 6 May 1982
- Type: Non-governmental organisation
- Registration no.: 4 of 1988
- Headquarters: Lombi Crescent, New China Town, Guadalcanal, Solomon Islands
- Executive Director: Longden Manedika

Solomon Islands Development Trust is a non-governmental organisation based in the Solomon Islands which promotes community development on a local level.

== Work ==
The Trust works with other organisations, such as Australian Volunteers International (AVI). AVI has placed 35 volunteers with the Trust since 1982. A short film, titled Hart Blog Kantri was made about the partnership

In addition to these partnerships, the Trust has worked with a number of British and Commonwealth of Nations organisations

The Trust has also been involved in programmes to combat domestic violence
