= Deccan Development Society =

- Type: NGO
- Industry: NGO
- Founded: 1983
- Headquarters: Hyderabad, India
- Area served: India
- Website: Official site

Deccan Development Society is an Indian agri-based NGO in Medak district in the state of Telangana, India. It works on various crop improvement programs and activities helping the local farmers. The Women Sangams (groups) of the Deccan Development Society (DDS) were honored with the Equator Prize in 2019 by United Nations Development Programme (UNDP) for their contribution to ecology and innovations in rainfed millet cultivation.

== History ==
The Deccan Development Society is a two-decade-old grassroots organization working in about 75 villages with women's societies. The organization envisions consolidating these village groups into vibrant groups of primary local governance and federate them into a strong pressure lobby for women, the poor and dalits.

== The Organization ==
The Deccan Development society is projecting a working model for the people-oriented participation development in the areas of food security, ecological agriculture, and alternate education. It is also trying to reverse the historical process of degradation of the environment and people's livelihood system in this region through a string of land-related activities such as Permaculture, Community Grain Bank, Community Gene Fund, Community Green Fund and Collective Cultivation through land Lease etc. These activities, alongside taking on the role of Earth care, are also resulting in human care, by giving the women a new found dignity and profile in their village communities. The society is trying to relocate the people's knowledge in the area of health and agriculture.

Its present director is P. V. Sateesh.

== Awards ==
Prince Albert II of Monaco Foundation Award - June 2020
