= Grassroots Radio Coalition =

Coalition of community media activists

GRC logo

The Grassroots Radio Coalition is a coalition of community media activists. The GRC has a mailing list and holds a conference every year, but has so far not incorporated. There are no dues, no hierarchy and no bylaws. At the GRC11 in 2006, conference attendees decided to establish a steering committee to help coordinate coalition issues.

== Mission statement ==
The coalition views itself as an offshoot of public radio that emphasizes community access and volunteer involvement in radio station operations. The group's Mission Statement reflects the view that grassroots stations are more than "audio outlets":

More than audio outlets, volunteer-based community radio stations are cultural institutions in their communities, reflecting the unique concerns and passions of the people who live there. With a system of governance based on openness and collaboration, and diverse programming produced by volunteers and funded by listeners, these stations are cornerstones of participatory democracy, offering ordinary citizens the chance to exercise First Amendment rights in a mass medium and audiences the opportunity to directly support the programming that is of importance to them.

== History ==
The Grassroots Radio Coalition was born in 1996, as a reaction against increasing commercialization of public radio and lack of support for volunteer-based stations. Though not "founders" per se, Marty Durlin of KGNU and Cathy Melio of WERU are generally recognized as "midwives" of the GRC. They have said that the idea of the GRC was ready to be born; they just helped make it happen.

Conferences have been held each summer since 1996, organized and hosted by one or two grassroots radio stations or organizations each year.

- 1996: presented by KGNU and WERU, hosted by KGNU in Boulder, Colorado.
- 1997: presented by KGNU and WERU, hosted by KGNU in Boulder, Colorado
- 1998: presented by KGNU and WERU, hosted by KGNU in Boulder, Colorado from July 23–25.
- 1999: presented by KGNU and WERU, hosted by WERU in Bar Harbor, Maine from August 20–23.
- 2000: hosted by WORT in Madison, Wisconsin in July 2000.
- 2001: hosted by KGNU in Boulder, Colorado from July 13–15.
- 2002: hosted by WJFF in Jeffersonville, New York in August 2002.
- 2003: hosted by KZMU in Moab, Utah from June 12–15.
- 2004: hosted by KCSB in Santa Barbara, California from June 24–27.
- 2005: hosted by Prometheus Radio Project in tandem with a barnraising for WXOJ-LP, a new station in Northampton, MA, from August 5–7.
- 2006: hosted by WORT in Madison, Wisconsin from July 28–30.
- 2007: hosted by WUML in Lowell, Massachusetts from June 21–24.
- 2008: hosted by KBOO in Portland, Oregon in July.
- 2010: hosted by KMUD in Redway/Garberville, California May 13–16.
- 2011: hosted by KKFI in Kansas City, Missouri August 18–21.
- 2012: hosted by WRFU-LP and Urbana-Champaign Independent Media Center in Urbana-Champaign, Illinois July 26–19
- 2014: Hosted by KHOI in Ames, Iowa August 14–17
- 2015: Hosted by WLPP-LP in Palenville, New York September 24–27
- 2016: Hosted by KUHS-LP in Hot Springs, Arkansas October 7–10
- 2017: Hosted by WCAA-LP in Albany, New York October 6–9
- 2018: Hosted by KBOO at Portland, Oregon October 5–7
- 2019: Hosted by WXIR-LP (100.9 FM) and WEPL-LP (PODER 97.1 FM), Rochester, New York October 4–6
- 2020: Held virtually by WXOX-LP (97.1 FM), Louisville, Kentucky October 9–11
- 2021: No conference due to the worldwide COVID-19 pandemic
- 2022: No conference due to the worldwide pandemic
- 2023: Hosted by WTSQ-LP Historical website: https://www.2023grassrootsradioconference.com/
- 2024: Hosted by WHIV-LP, New Orleans; Grassroots Radio Conference 2024, Wikidata Q131011084
- 2025: Hosted by KYRS, Sept. 11-14, Spokane, Washington; 2025 Grassroots Radio Conference, Wikidata Q137380320
- 2026: Hosted by Free Radio Pensacola and WPNX-LP, Sept. 24-26, Pensacola, Florida; Community Radio in Formation, Wikidata Q141128761

== Steering committee ==
At the GRC11 in Madison, Wisconsin, conference attendees decided to create a steering committee to help coordinate discussions, assist in conference planning, and maintain institutional memory. The concept of the steering committee is in line with the GRC's decentralized, grassroots nature. Though there is no minimum or maximum number of members of the steering committee, it was agreed that it should include representatives from stations who have hosted past GRC conferences, representatives from future GRC conference hosts, and representatives from the People of Color caucus.

== People of Color Caucus ==
The People of Color Caucus is a loose group of producers and activists in the coalition. The People of Color Caucus holds meet-ups at the summer GRC conferences and undertakes initiatives to help increase the racial & ethnic diversity of the coalition and conference attendees. The People of Color Caucus raises funds for and administers the "Solidarity Fund" - a scholarship fund to assist low income people of color to attend GRC conferences.

== See also ==
- National Federation of Community Broadcasters
- Pacifica Foundation
- List of Pacifica Radio stations and affiliates
- List of community radio stations in the United States
