= Feminist Radio Network =

American radio distribution network

The Feminist Radio Network (FRN) was an American radio distribution network founded in 1974 which primarily circulated programs by and about women. It was formed out of the earlier organization Radio Free Women, which was associated with station WGTB at Georgetown University. One of the FRN's stated goals was to promote communication across diverse groups of women broadcasters, guests, and listeners. It simultaneously produced original radio content and evaluated submissions from other stations to include in its published catalogs. The 1979 distribution catalog included 49 programs, and the 1985 catalog listed 80 programs. The FRN was utilized by other women's advocacy groups and radio organizations to share their radio programs to a broader audience. FRN programs included interviews, investigative journalism, and a multi-part series about women in jazz. It also published a newsletter titled Calliope. Carolyn Byerly and Karen Ross write that "[t]he group's members ranged in political perspectives—Marxist-Leninist, Socialist Worker, lesbian-feminist, radical feminist, and liberal feminist—and all were self-taught in their broadcast and journalism skills."
