= National Federation of Community Broadcasters =

- Abbreviation: NFCB
- Formation: 1975
- Type: 501(c)(3)
- Legal status: Association
- Purpose: Community Broadcasting
- Headquarters: Belgrade, MT
- Region served: United States
- Members: 190 radio stations
- Chief Executive Officer: Rima Dael
- Website: nfcb.org

The National Federation of Community Broadcasters (NFCB) is a nonprofit membership organization of nearly 200 community radio stations in the United States. Community stations are independent, nonprofit organizations and their broadcast service is noncommercial. These stations are governed, operated, and financially supported by people in the communities they serve. They provide opportunities for individuals, groups, and communities to tell their own stories and celebrate their own culture. Their programming is often a blend of hyperlocal focus and global sensibilities, mixing news, public affairs, music, and cultural expression.

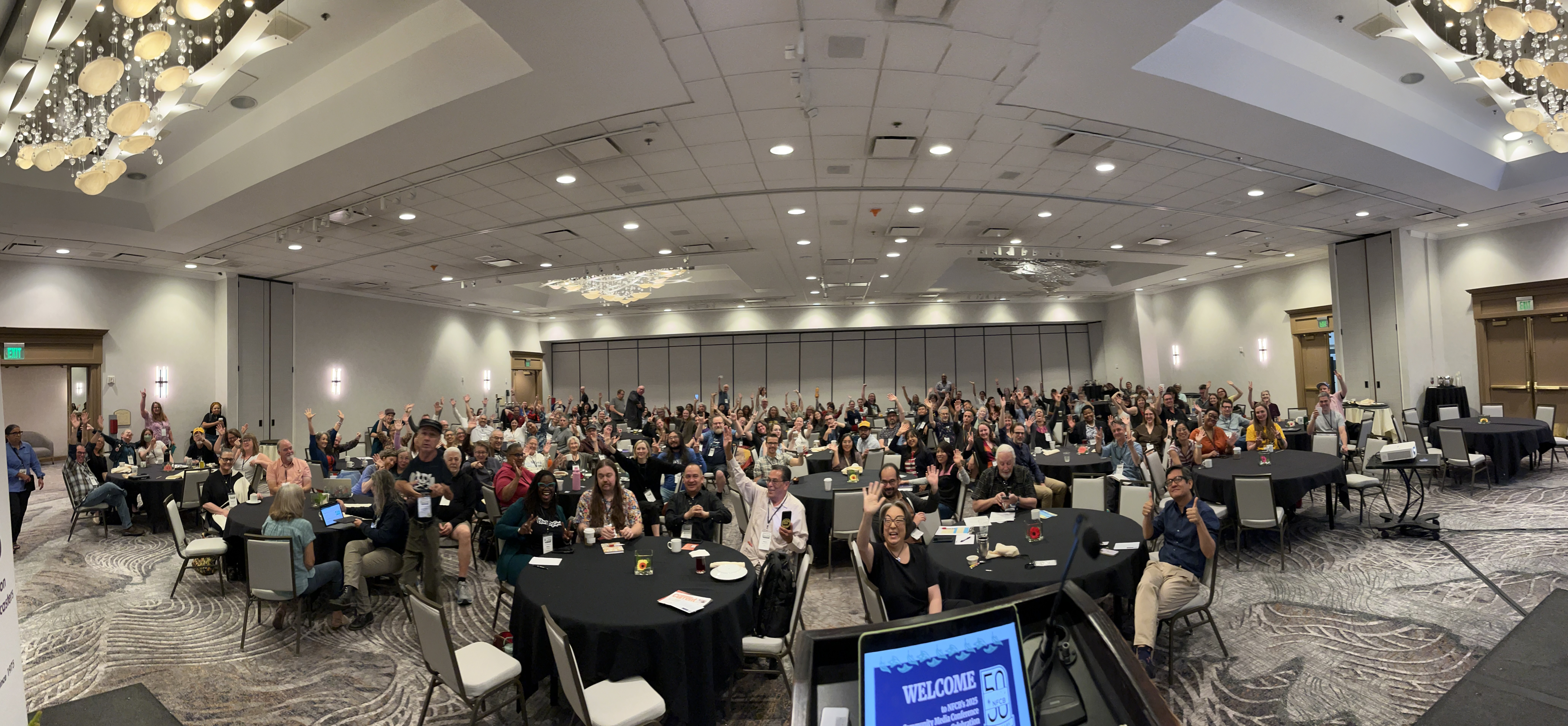
NFCB 2025 Conference Attendees at Opening Address

Community volunteers play significant roles in creating programming and providing behind the scenes support to community radio stations. Most stations complement their broadcasts with online streaming and other digital services, as well as by sponsoring local events such as concerts and issue forums. Most do not have budgets that allow them to join the NPR network or carry national news magazines.

Over half of NFCB's member stations serve small, rural communities in which they are often the only locally controlled daily media and the only source of local news. Others work in larger urban areas and focus on communities that are otherwise not well-reflected in the commercial radio marketplace. These commitments are challenging and constrain the resources of most community radio stations. More than 6 in 10 NFCB members report annual budgets under $100,000.

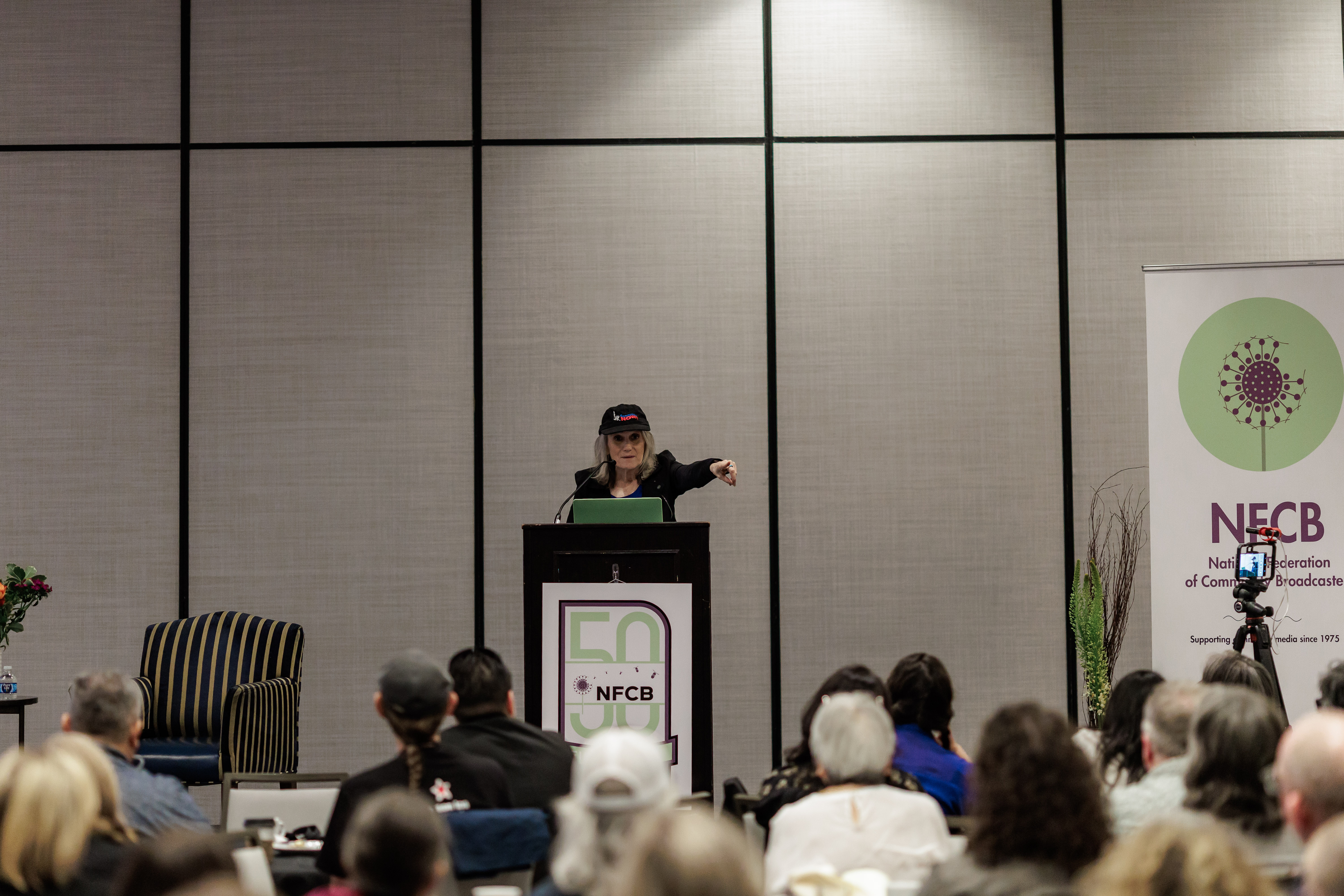
Amy Goodman delivered an inspiring keynote address in front of an attentive crowd.

== Impact ==
NFCB has served community stations since 1975 and is the oldest and largest national organization dedicated to community stations within the public media system. Over its 50 years of service, NFCB has helped to:

- Provided non-commercial listener-supported radio with a national presence and a collective identity as "community radio".
- Shaped national regulatory and federal funding policies to build pathways for community stations to grow and be sustained. The organization successfully encouraged the Corporation for Public Broadcasting (CPB) to expand the number of stations eligible to receive Community Service Grants, and helped stations obtain FCC licenses.
- Improved the performance of community stations in audience reac, community impact, financial sustainability, volunteer and professional development, and legal compliance.
- Created and maintains an active email listserv facilitates communication and peer learning.
- Accelerated the inclusion of people of color and women within community radio across the public radio system.
- Developed strategic initiatives aimed at modernizing and updating community radio to serve audiences in the digital age.

NFCB's support for its members includes hosting in-person gatherings at regional summits and a biennial national conference.

== History ==
NFCB was founded in 1975 after decades of growth in the community radio industry inspired largely by two iconoclastic broadcast activists in the San Francisco Bay Area: Lewis Hill, who founded the Pacifica network of radio stations in California in the late 1940s, and Lorenzo Milam, who founded a series of community radio stations across the country in the early 1960s.

In 1971 Milam self-published Sex and Broadcasting, which offered a comprehensive step-by-step guide to licensing, financing, building and operating a community station. The opening lines clearly reflected Milam's irreverent approach to the industry: "Broadcasting as it exists now in the United States is a pitiful, unmitigated whore. At some stage in its history, there was a chance to turn it to a creative, artful, caring medium; but then all the toads came along, realizing the power of radio and television to hawk their awful wares."

In June 1975, staff and volunteers from existing and soon-to-launch community stations, along with community radio aspirants and organizers – some 75 in all – convened the first National Alternative Radio Konference (NARK). At the conclusion of the gathering the attendees generally agreed that it was time for coordinated national activities to accelerate and support the growing field.

A few months later the NFCB was created as a non-profit organization that would provide information to community radio stations on federal policy issues, represent the interests of member stations to the Corporation for Public Broadcasting and the FCC on those policy issues; facilitate communication between NFCB members; coordinate member activities and publicize member activity. Tom Thomas and Terry Clifford, both already veterans of the young community radio world at that time, were designated directors of a new national office opened in Washington D.C. to carry out the objectives of the new organization.

Another signature element of NFCB services in the earliest years was the NFCB "Radio Program Exchange" service, a system to share programs and projects on tape among member stations. The Program Service merged with the Pacifica Program Service in the fall of 1986, but early on it provided a pathway into community radio for independent producers. The Program Service was supported in part by the National Endowment for the Arts. It gave the evolving community stations a chance to hear and present the work of their peers across the country, enhancing the sense that community radio, for all its diversity, was also connected by shared purposes, aesthetics, and identity.

In the late 1970s and early 1980s, community radio continued to expand. NFCB soon reached a membership of 75 stations and broadcasting groups. In 1978, Nan Rubin joined NFCB staff as its first Director of Station Services, traveling the country to help stations get on the air and stay on the air. She helped launch the Minority Ownership Project, creating pathways for Native American and Latino-led organizations to build stations of their own. In 1982, NFCB organized the first Minority Producers Conference in 1982, with support from the CPB.

During this first decade, the NFCB was able to secure foundation support and grants from the CPB and other government agencies which bestowed credibility on the organization and on community radio in general. The Federation also embraced the emerging community of independent radio producers and helped in the formation of the Association of Independents in Radio (AIR). In the early 1980s, the NFCB published AudioCraft, a production training manual that was used in college and university classes across the country and The Public Radio Legal Handbook that remains a standard public radio reference tool.

=== 1984 to 1997 – Leadership transitions ===
In 1984, NFCB President Tom Thomas and Vice President Terry Clifford left their leadership positions at NFCB and the Federation went through a series of leadership changes. After their departure, Carol Schatz, the former general manager of Bethel Broadcasting in Alaska, became the second executive director. In 1987 Lynn Chadwick was hired to run the organization and she grew the membership during her tenure to about 100 stations.

Chadwick came to NFCB with a background at the Feminist Radio Network and as a former managing director of Western Public Radio, a non-profit production and training institute in San Francisco. Chadwick oversaw a decade of growth within the community radio system and for NFCB, while at the same time addressed long-standing financial challenges for the institution. After successful lobbying of Congress, NPR and CPB, by 1970, Chadwick helped change the picture of public broadcasting in the U.S.: "Community broadcasters provided the talents, knowledge, skills, and abilities to push public radio in new directions, to become more open to change and more responsive to listeners. In the process, the National Federation of Community Broadcasters moved from the margins to the mainstream of public radio policymaking in the United States."

When Chadwick left NFCB in 1997 to run Pacifica, the organization brought on Carol Pierson as Executive Director. Prior to taking the top role at the NFCB, Pierson was Program Director and director of radio productions at KQED in San Francisco. Pierson grew membership to about 150 stations. Under Pierson's tenure NFCB became the incubator organization for Native Public Media and the Latino Public Radio Consortium. She also cooperated with Prometheus Radio Project on the Low-Power FM movement, as well as other national organizations. In 2007 she testified before Congress on the need for the FCC to maintain strict ownership rules: "We know that the consolidation of radio ownership has left local, women, and minority owners out in the cold. This is no time to further loosen ownership rules. The FCC must re-affirm the historic regulatory priorities of localism, competition and diversity."

During Pierson's tenure new publications were released by NFCB, including "A Guide to Underwriting for Public Radio", "The Volunteer Management Handbook for Community Radio", and "the Guide to Political Broadcasting for Public Radio Stations." NFCB also put together group buys of equipment and services at discounted rates for member stations, launched the National Youth in Radio Training Project and the Rural Programming Initiative. It also staged the first Latino and Native Radio Summits.

In 2010, upon Pierson's retirement, NFCB hired Maxie Jackson for a tenure that ended abruptly in 2013 when the board fired him. Jackson developed a model for community radio sustainability and growth known as the 5x5 Model.

=== 2014 to 2025 – Revitalized leadership ===
Sally Kane joined NFCB as director in 2014. Kane is credited with rebuilding NFCB from the ground up and returning the organization to solvency. Kane's background leading a rural service network in western Colorado brought experience grounded in core principles of serving the information needs of rural communities.

With a revitalized staff and board, Kane shepherded in new bylaws in 2015 and developed the Circle of Engagement model that helped stations lead change through a framework of engagement, content, revenue, and organizational capacity. In 2018 CPB funded NFCB's Community Counts Initiative, a cohort-based learning program for community radio stations serving rural and underrepresented communities. CCI evolved into NFCB's current Audience Counts Initiative, funded by the CPB in February 2025. The Audience Counts Initiative is a program that provides stations with training, education, and hands-on experience to be successful with change management, conflict navigation, volunteer and leadership training, and in producing local journalism. Both CCI and ACI were created with an eye towards sharing case studies with other NFCB stations and the larger public media system.

Sally Kane retired in 2023 and A. Rima Dael became the new Chief Executive Officer in 2024. A. Rima Dael has over 30 years of experience working with nonprofit organizations in Public Media, Arts, Education & the Human Service sectors. She came to NFCB after serving as General Manager of WSHU Public Radio and as a board member of National Public Radio (NPR). Before that, Rima worked at New England Public Media (NEPM).

== Membership ==
According to the NFCB bylaws adopted in 2015, membership is open to media entities incorporated as not-for-profit organizations as defined in Section 501(c)(3) of the Code or to an educational institution or other public entity which provides or seeks to provide a broadcast or online content service to the general public and which pays an annual contribution ("dues") set by the Board of Directors from time-to-time. The Board of Directors may approve other classes of voting and non-voting membership and establish voting rights for such Memberships.

As of 2025, NFCB had nearly 200 members across the country.

== Organization ==
NFCB has a 3 member staff: a Chief Executive Officer, a Chief Operating Officer and a Director of Member Engagement.

The NFCB is led by a volunteer Board of Directors consisting of at least 7 people and not more than 9 people. At least one-third of the directors are elected by the membership and the remaining vacant Directors are appointed by the Board. Each director serves a term of 3 years, or until a successor has been elected or appointed and qualified. Appointed directors serve for a three year term. No director may serve for more than nine consecutive years unless such director was appointed to serve an unfinished term of another director.

== Awards ==
Sally Kane Leadership in Community Media Award – recognizing an individual or organization who has demonstrated sustained leadership, dedicated service, innovation, and impact in the field. The inaugural award went to Sally Kane in 2023. Nan Rubin received the award in 2025.

== See also ==
- Pacifica Foundation
- List of Pacifica Radio stations and affiliates
- List of community radio stations in the United States
- Grassroots Radio Coalition
