= Jeremy Lansman =

American radio engineer, station creator, and producer

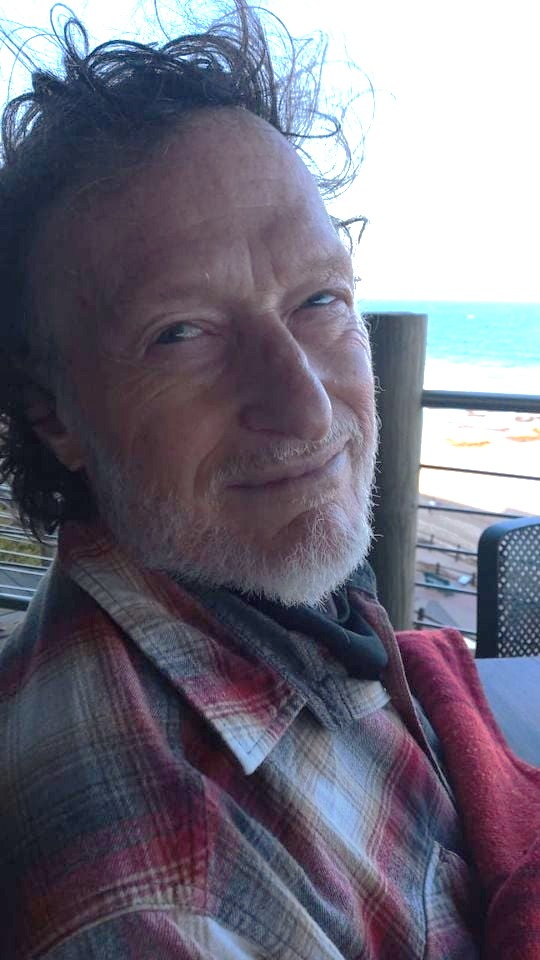
Lansman in 2021

Jeremy David Lansman (November 25, 1942 – December 28, 2024) was an American radio engineer, station creator, and producer. Lansman contributed to the growth of community radio in the United States by helping establish numerous community radio stations across the United States including KRAB Seattle, KBOO Portland, KDNA St. Louis, KFAT Gilroy, KBDI-TV Broomfield, and KYES-TV Anchorage.

== Early life ==
Lansman grew up in Central West End, St. Louis, Missouri, the son of Paul Lansman, a mathematician, and Elizabeth Gips. As a child, Lansman played with electronic kits and built small devices, including crystal radios, tube radios, and an FM receiver. Experimenting at home in St. Louis with electronics and a radio kit, Lansman made his first radio broadcast at the age of seven, from his bedroom to his parents’ radio downstairs. "[I] found a positive reinforcement with radio that was lacking in the rest of my life. I could make it work when nothing else in my life did."

== Career ==
In the late 1950s, Lansman moved to San Francisco as a teenager and became a volunteer at KPFA in Berkeley, the first listener supported radio station in the country. Lansman dropped out of high school and eventually became chief engineer at KHOE in Truckee, California. After his work at KHOE, the station owner sent Lansman to Honolulu to build a new station.

Lansman founded radio stations, including KDNA in St. Louis, Missouri and KFAT in Gilroy, California, that had reputations for testing the creative boundaries of radio in community involvement, creative expression, and music formats. From the 1960s until the early 2000s, Lansman helped many non-commercial radio community stations across the United States obtain broadcast licenses by identifying available frequencies and transmitter locations, then advising them on how to meet the requirements of the Federal Communications Commission.

"...community radio... would not have happened without Jeremy because Jeremy actually built the stations," said Michael Huntsberger, a professor emeritus at Linfield University in Portland, Ore., who wrote a doctoral dissertation about the history of community radio.

=== KRAB Seattle 1961-1966 ===
In 1961, while visiting Washington state, Lansman answered a classified ad from Lorenzo Milam, who was looking for an engineer to help him start an experimental FM station in Seattle. At age 19, Lansman became KRAB’s chief engineer. KRAB-FM 107.7 went on the air on December 12, 1962. Lansman worked at KRAB for four years and developed an ongoing partnership with Milam. During that time, he also helped a sister station, KBOO in Portland, Oregon, get on the air. Milam wrote an article in Ralph (The Review of Arts, Literature, Philosophy and the Humanities) about Lansman’s time at KRAB, his ability to make antique transmitters work, and his impact on community radio.

=== KDNA St. Louis 1967-1974 ===
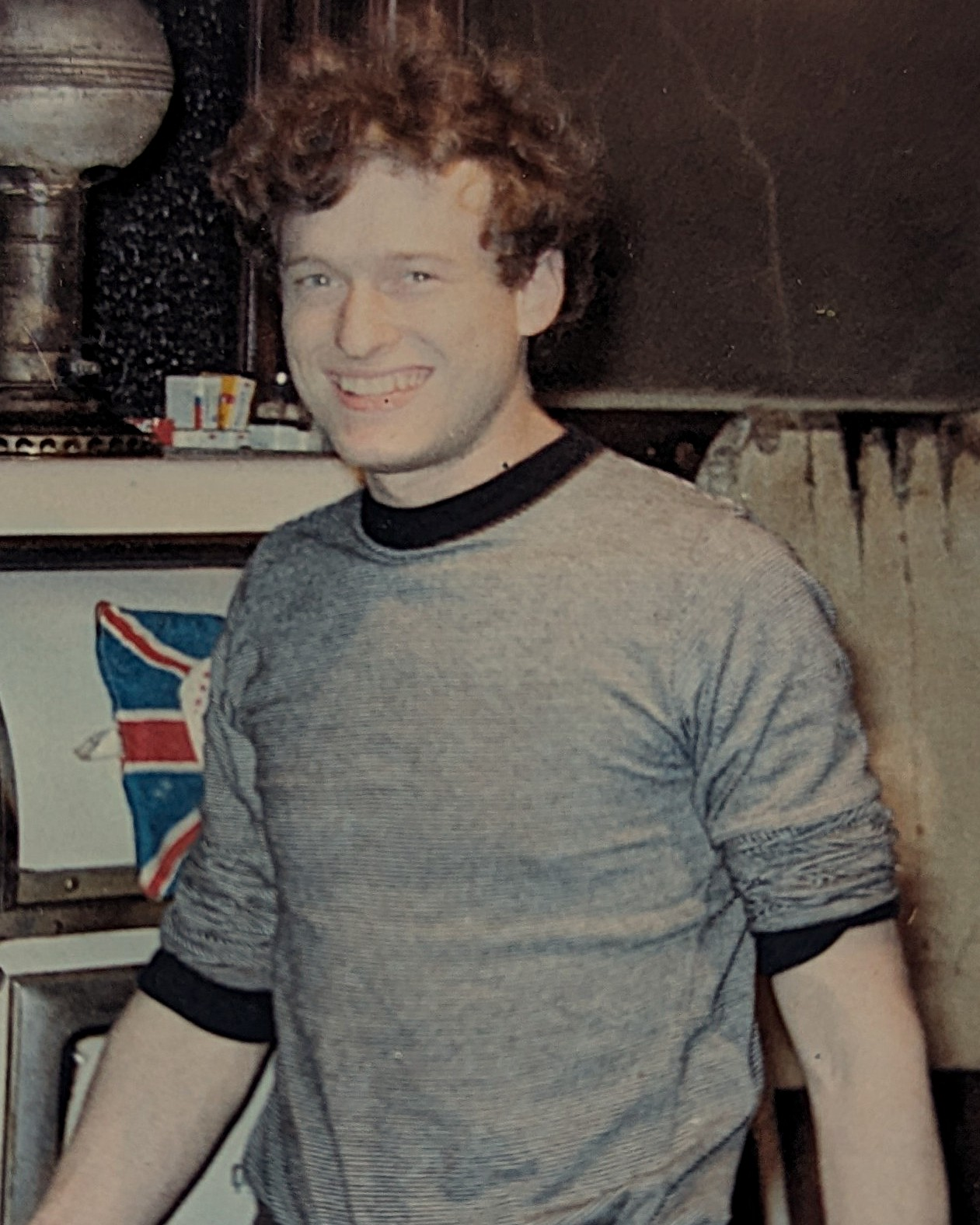
Jeremy Lansman 1970 at KDNA

In 1963, Lansman and Milam applied for a broadcast license for an unused FM frequency in St. Louis (102.5 Mhz), There was a competitive application for the frequency, from the Christian Fundamental Church, "a temple that proudly proclaimed, on a sign out front, that it was racially segregated." In 1967, after hearings and a court case, the FCC awarded the license to Lansman and Milam. Lansman's radio station KDNA was located up the street from the former site of the Crystal Palace in the former entertainment district Gaslight Square.

KDNA went on the air in February 1969, broadcasting from an old house. The station had advertisers for its first year and a half, without much success, then turned to its listeners for support to be able to keep its eclectic format. Lansman led a core staff of about a dozen people, most of whom lived upstairs from the studio. Each received room, board, and a small monthly stipend. Volunteers also had programs and helped out in various ways. Milam, the co-owner, lived in California and rarely visited St. Louis and was not directly involved in the station’s operations. Lansman's life partner, Cammie Enslow, played an active role in the construction and early days of KDNA. Lansman had the final decision-making power and worked to keep the free-form approach of the programming. Tom Thomas and Terry Clifford, KDNA staff members, "fondly" recalled Lansman’s governing style as "surrealist" and "chaotic."

KDNA programming was known for its spontaneity. It included a wide range of music, including jazz, folk, bluegrass, avant-garde, classical, African and other ethnic genres, with local musicians often playing live in the studio. There were also poetry readings, plays, and discussions. Lansman allowed a diverse set of organizations to have their own shows, including the John Birch Society, the Black Panthers, the Scientologists, and the Gay Liberation Front. The station broadcast sessions of the St. Louis Board of Aldermen live. Various program elements were woven together with an improvisatory approach. "Announcer[s] might decide to follow Mozart with Hank Williams and Hank Williams with Miles Davis and Miles Davis with a rock group called the 50-Foot Hose, a KDNA favorite. You never quite knew what to expect." Milam described the station as "fearless and magical."

Lansman used an engineering analogy to explain his vision of the purpose of KDNA:

"Good radio is a feedback system, providing society continuing information about itself so that society can be self-correcting. Like society, a servomechanism without negative feedback goes wild, cannot function, hunts and oscillates. Correct information can set the system back on the correct ‘course’ – like an aircraft autopilot. KDNA, when it was functioning at peak efficiency, had such a self-adjusting system. It was the four telephones which could be linked together and put on the air. It was the people who called in on these telephones, commenting on our programs, correcting our factual or interpretive errors, adding, constantly adding new bits of information and details, feeding their ideas back into the society serving and served by our constantly changing signal. The listener fed back and became KDNA. KDNA became a self-correcting servomechanism of the community that was part of it …"

In a 1973 video interview about KDNA, Lansman said that he was most proud of the community dialogues fostered by the station's phone-in shows. By 1973, operating KDNA was becoming more and more difficult. Robberies and crime around the studio building were increasing. In 1970, there was a drug bust, though charges were later dropped, and other instances of police harassment. Lansman and Milam decided to sell the station’s broadcast license, which was in the now-valuable commercial FM band. KDNA staff, volunteers, and supporters created a non-profit organization, the Double Helix Corporation, to continue KDNA’s vision of community radio.

Double Helix was not able to raise enough money to buy out Milam and Lansman. They sold the KDNA broadcast license to Cecil and Joyce Heftel, who used the frequency for a commercial easy listening station. KDNA went off the air on June 22, 1973 and the sale was completed in late 1973. Milam and Lansman received $1.1 million, some of which was used to help start non-profit community radio stations in places across the United States.

Lansman helped Double Helix apply for a license at 88.1 Mhz in St. Louis, in the noncommercial band. After years of delay, due to another competitive situation, the FCC granted Double Helix a license. KDHX went on the air on October 14, 1987.

=== FCC Petition RM-2493 1974 ===
In 1974, Lansman, with Lorenzo Milam, filed RM-2493, a Petition for Rulemaking with the Federal Communications Commission. RM-2493 challenged the eligibility requirements for operating noncommercial educational (NCE) stations. Specifically, the petition requested that faith-based organizations not be granted licenses to operate stations in the portion of the spectrum reserved for NCE stations (88.1 to 91.9 FM), because they presented a one-sided view. The FCC denied the petition in 1975, citing its obligation to remain neutral towards religion on First Amendment.

RM-2493 generated the most public comment received by the FCC on any single issue. By the time the petition was denied in August 1975, the FCC had received an estimated 750,000 letters of protest. Many were based on the mistaken belief that the petition wanted all religious broadcasting banned. Lansman said that he suspected representatives of religious groups failed to read the petition carefully and "in their panic reacted to the rhetoric of the petition instead of the facts."

Letters and petitions of protest continued to swamp the FCC for years after RM-2493 was denied. Many were based on an urban legend that well-known atheist Madalyn Murray O'Hair was behind the petition. By 1988, the FCC had received 21 million letters.

=== KFAT Gilroy, CA 1975-1979 ===
In 1975, using some of the proceeds from the sale of KDNA, Lansman and Milam bought KSND (94.5 Mhz), a low wattage station in Gilroy, CA, a small agricultural community 80 miles south of San Francisco. They changed the call letters to KFAT, which went on the air on August 6, 1975. Lansman and his partner, Laura Ellen Hopper, ran the station. Milam moved to Dallas to start another community radio station, KCHU. Lansman and Hopper hired Larry Yurdin as the first station manager. He helped to define KFAT’s sound, an irreverent mix of country, blues, folk, rock, Hawaiian, and humor. There was an emphasis on playing music not heard anywhere else. KFAT became a Bay Area counterculture phenomenon (dedicated listeners called themselves “FATheads”). The musical format pioneered at KFAT later became known as Americana music or American Roots music. Yurdin left after about six months, but the musical approach continued.

"Having a subversive country station was always a dream of mine," Lansman said about KFAT in 1978.

Tom Leyde of The Californian described KFAT's music as a "conglomeration of old and new country music, country swing, bluegrass, folk music, and off-color monologues mixed with live studio music and remote broadcasts from concerts and clubs. One is apt to hear anything from Hank Williams and Bob Wills and his Texas Playboys, to Kris Kristofferson and Jerry Jeff Walker." KFAT was a commercial station, but one with frequent financial difficulties. Despite its passionate, loyal listenership, advertising was difficult to sell, in part because its unique sound and format confused advertisers, who were used to radio with clearly defined genres and audience demographics. Often, the staff and DJs were not paid and staff dissatisfaction was a constant theme.

Lansman used his technical skills to fix a transmitter interference problem, which immediately extended KFAT’s signal into Santa Cruz. In 1976, KFAT received FCC permission to move its transmitter to Loma Prieta, a much higher mountain. After Lansman upgraded the transmitter, the signal reached San Jose, San Francisco, and much of the Bay Area. KFAT’s audience and influence grew tremendously. Lansman staged remote broadcasts of live music from Palo Alto and San Francisco, an innovative concept when few other radio stations did anything similar.

In 1979, Lansman left active management of KFAT and moved to Colorado. He and Milam put the station up for sale. In 1980, the station was sold.

=== KBDI-TV Broomfield, CO 1980-1982 ===
In 1979, Lansman began working to start an alternative public television station, KBDI-TV, in the Boulder-Denver area. He helped get the station on the air in February 1980 and served as operations director. KBDI operated on a very low budget and was known for controversial programming, including documentaries on the conflicts in Central America and home movies submitted by viewers.

=== KYES-TV Anchorage, AK 1990-2016 ===
Lansman and his wife, Carol Schatz, applied for a license for a television station, Channel 5, in Anchorage, which was unused and available. The FCC awarded them a construction permit and the station, KYES-TV, went on the air in January, 1990.

Owning a VHF television station was widely considered to be a lucrative business. Lansman said he wanted KYES to be profitable and become his "retirement plan."

KYES went on the air in January 1990. At first, the station offered Video Juke Box, a pay-per-choice music video service, which enabled viewers to request a video for which they were charged a fee through a 900 telephone number. Later, KYES was the first television station in Anchorage to convert to digital broadcasting, using equipment assembled by Lansman from used components.

In 2012, in response to the Citizens United decision, which allowed corporations to make unlimited political contributions, Lansman offered free airtime on KYES for 30-second spots to candidates for the Alaska legislature.

Schatz and Lansman sold the station in 2016.

== Impact on Community Radio ==
After the sale of KDNA in 1974, Lansman and two former KDNA staffers, Tom Thomas and Terry Clifford, helped people across the country apply for FCC licenses for community radio stations. Lansman provided technical expertise to identify available FM frequencies, locate transmitter sites, and prepare the required engineering information. Thomas and Clifford advised applicants on how to craft successful applications, and wrote and edited applications when needed.

Community radio stations that obtained licenses from this work included WRFG in Atlanta, GA; WEFT in Champaign, IL; WAIF in Cincinnati, OH; KOPN in Columbia, MO; KCHU in Dallas, TX; KKFI in Kansas City, MO; WORT in Madison, WI; WEVL in Memphis, TN; WDNA in Miami, FL; KFAI in Minneapolis, MN; WYEP in Pittsburgh, PA; KPOO in San Francisco, CA; KBDY in St. Louis, MO; KDHX in St. Louis, MO; and KOTO in Telluride, CO.

While creating these new community radio stations, Lansman advocated for radio’s potential to be a medium for free speech, community dialogue, and creative expression.

In 1975, Thomas and Clifford founded the National Federation of Community Broadcasters (NFCB) as a resource for community-based stations around the country. NFCB is still in operation 50 years later.

Throughout his life, Lansman helped stations get on the air. By the 1980s, almost no FM frequencies were available in large and mid-sized markets, so his focus changed to smaller towns and rural areas. "[Lansman] was involved with the start-up of so many stations, not just the ones that he owned, but the ones that he inspired," Huntsberger said. "He helped people get their stations together in the most practical way. He knew what the engineering was about. He knew what the FCC side of the engineering was. And that was an enormous contribution."

While running KYES, Lansman still found time to help small community radio stations get on the air in Alaska. He often worked hands-on with the equipment. A 2004 article in the Anchorage Press describes such a scene:

"At [a transmitter site], [Lansman] beamed a devilish smile as he turned on a new station, KWMD 90.7 FM. He doesn't own the station, but he's on the board of the nonprofit formed to launch it, Alaska Educational Radio System Inc. Lansman has made a name for himself in Anchorage with Channel 5, but his first love is radio, which is why we were at Site 17. He pulled a pair of eyeglasses from his shirt pocket and squatted next to a transmitter on the floor. He peered into the box's electronic guts, poking them with a screwdriver. For the next hour, he crawled around the transmitter and climbed a step ladder behind the racks, moving with the quickness of a hyperactive teenager. His movements and thick, wiry hair belied the fact that he's 61 years old. He's a small guy who kind of looks like Lyle Lovett. In broadcasting circles, some view this diminutive man as a giant. Some describe Lansman as a genius and a maverick. Fellow broadcasters say he's an engineer who can get a clean signal on the cheap, whether the equipment is new, secondhand or he built himself ...Others might say Lansman is a prankster, a renegade – a troublemaker, as in, 'Here comes trouble.'"

He traveled from Alaska to several radio "barn raisings" around the country sponsored by the Prometheus Radio Project. These were short term projects for stations that had received FCC construction permits to actually get on the air and begin broadcasting. He worked out engineering problems, tuned antennas, and repaired used transmitters.

“Having Jeremy Lansman on hand to start your station is like having Jimi Hendrix open your music store.” – Bennett Kobb, telecommunications journalist.

In 2013, Lansman was inducted into the St. Louis Radio Halls of Fame. His induction announcement credits him with "[helping] create a plethora of independent community stations throughout the country."

== Personal life ==
Lansman had several long-term romantic relationships in his life. He was together with Cammie Enslow from 1964 until 1970 and with Laura Ellen Hopper from 1971 until 1979. With Hopper he has a daughter, Elsbeth Lansman, born in 1973. In 1988 he married Carol Schatz and they divorced in 2016. In August 2012 he moved to South Africa to live with Ineke Buskens, who he married in 2017.

Lansman's cousin was Jay Landesman, owner of the Crystal Palace nightclub in the Gaslight Square entertainment district and a well-known literary figure.

== Death ==
In 2009, Lansman was diagnosed with myelodysplasia. On December 28, 2024, he died at his home, in Grabouw, South Africa, from complications of the disease.

== Further Resources ==
- "Fat Chance: Listener-Supported Radio in St. Louis" (1974) A video documentary by Eric von Schrader. Shows the station in action, with live performances and interviews. Watch on YouTube.
- A Conversation with Jeremy Lansman (2006) by Dr. John Anderson (formerly of Brooklyn College). A long audio interview (1:20:25) during which Lansman talks about his life, career, and views on media in America Listen here.
- "Remembering Jeremy Lansman, Radio Pioneer," program on KSQD, Santa Cruz, CA, "Talk of the Bay" with Rachel Goodman. Broadcast on January 3, 2025. Discussion focuses on Lansman's station, KFAT. Listen here.
- Milam, Lorenzo W.; Introduction by Thomas J. Thomas. (2017). Sex and Broadcasting: a handbook on starting a radio station for the community. Dover Publications, Inc., Mineola, NY
- Walker, Jesse (2001) Rebels on the air: An alternate history of Radio in America. New York University Press, NYC
- Klein, G. (2016). Fat Chance: We were the last gasp of the 60s and the birth of Americana music but was America ready for us?. Main Frame Press, Chula Vista California CA
- Huntsberger, Michael William (2007). The Emergence of Community Radio in the United States: A Historical Examination of the National Federation of Community Broadcasters, 1970 to 1990. A DISSERTATION Presented to the School of Journalism and Communication and the Graduate School of the University of Oregon in partial fulfillment of the requirements for the degree of Doctor of Philosophy. Spring 2007
- Christiansen, Scott (August 26, 2004). "Renegade broadcaster Jeremy Lansman leaves his mark across America". Anchorage Press
- Falk, Tyler (January 27, 2025). "Jeremy Lansman, trailblazer in community broadcasting, dies at 82". Current, News For People in Public Media
- Martin, George (February, 9, 1978) “KFAT – the ‘secret’ is getting out”. Oakland Tribune
- Barnes, Harper (July 3, 1983). Kooky KDNA: Long Gone, But Legacy Lingers". St. Louis Post-Dispatch
- KRAB Archive, https://www.krabarchive.com/
- FCC Petition RM-2493. Full text
- FCC Denial of RM-2493. Full Text.
