= K270BW =

Relays 99.1 KLJY-HD3, Clayton
- Bellefontaine, Missouri; United States
- Broadcast area: Greater St. Louis
- Frequency: 101.9 MHz
- Branding: NewsTalkSTL

Programming
- Format: Conservative talk

Ownership
- Owner: Epic STL
- Sister stations: KNBS

History
- First air date: March 24, 2014

Technical information
- Licensing authority: FCC
- Class: D
- ERP: 250 watts
- HAAT: 196.9 meters (646 ft)
- Transmitter coordinates: 38°34′24″N 90°19′30″W
- Repeater: 94.1 KNBS (Bowling Green)

Links
- Public license information: Public file; LMS
- Webcast: Listen Live
- Website: NewsTalkSTL

K270BW (101.9 MHz, branded as NewsTalkSTL) is a conservative talk radio station serving Greater St. Louis, located in Bellefontaine Neighbors, Missouri. It is transmitted with an effective radiated power of 250 watts. Its transmitter is located in St. Louis, while the studio is located near Westport Plaza in Maryland Heights, Missouri, and serves as the translator of sister outlet KLJY, where it can be heard on their third HD radio subchannel.

Former logo as "Boost 101.9" from 2014 to 2020)

Formerly a translator for the national K-Love network, "Boost 101.9" was launched on March 24, 2014, with a unique presentation designed to serve young listeners using hit music with positive lyrics and messages.

On January 4, 2021, Gateway Creative Broadcasting acquired the 95.5 FM signal in St. Louis and changed call letters to KXBS, and moved the "Boost Radio" format to that frequency. KXBS covers the entire metro area of St. Louis. After several months of simulcasting, K270BW flipped to conservative talk as "NewsTalkSTL" on July 19, 2021, and began relaying KLJY's HD3 subchannel. The station began simulcasting on KNBS (94.1 FM) on August 9.
