= Kurtenbach =

Kurtenbach is a surname. Notable people with the surname include:

- Al Kurtenbach (born 1934), American electrical engineer and politician
- Jim Kurtenbach (born 1957), American academic and politician
- Orland Kurtenbach (born 1936), Canadian ice hockey player and coach
- Ron Kurtenbach (born 1943), American communist
- Terry Kurtenbach (born 1963), Canadian-British ice hockey player
