= NBAC =

NBAC may refer to:

- National Building Arts Center
- North Baltimore Aquatic Club
