= Chris Hildrey =

British architect and designer

Christopher Hildrey is a British architect and designer based in London. He founded Hildrey Studio and created ProxyAddress, a service that provides people experiencing homelessness with stable address details to help them access essential support and services such as healthcare, banking, libraries, and welfare.

Hildrey received the Royal Institute of British Architects President's Medal for Research in 2018 for ProxyAddress. The project was included in the Design Museum's Beazley Designs of the Year 2019 exhibition, Time magazine's Best Inventions of 2021, and The Guardian’s best designs of 2022.

== Education and early career ==
Hildrey is from Crosby, near Liverpool. He studied at the University of Edinburgh and later at the Bartlett School of Architecture at University College London, graduating from the Bartlett's Architecture MArch programme in 2009 and its Postgraduate Advanced Architectural Research programme in 2012. He subsequently qualified as an architect through the University of Westminster.

His postgraduate research examined the causes of unpaid overtime and the economics of architectural practice. In articles for the Architects' Journal in 2013 and the RIBA Journal in 2019, he argued that reliance on unpaid overtime reflected systemic challenges in the profession's business model and highlighted opportunities for architects to diversify the ways in which their skills are applied.

Before establishing his own practice, he worked at Foster + Partners, the Office for Metropolitan Architecture (OMA), Zaha Hadid Architects and Níall McLaughlin Architects. At the latter, he was project architect for the redesign of the grounds of the Natural History Museum in London.

== Architectural practice ==
Hildrey founded Hildrey Studio in 2018. That year, the practice co-produced Space Gap, a pavilion outside Kensington Olympia that hosted discussions about housing, vacant property and rough sleeping.

=== ProxyAddress ===
Hildrey began developing ProxyAddress in 2017 while a Designer in Residence at the Design Museum, London. His research into barriers faced by people experiencing homelessness led him from an initial proposal for physical postboxes towards a system based on address data.

The service uses addresses supplied with property owners’ consent to provide users with consistent administrative details while they experience housing instability. It participated in the Financial Conduct Authority’s regulatory sandbox to test access to bank accounts for people without a fixed address.

In 2023, Inside Housing reported that 47 of the 49 participants in a Lewisham Council pilot had moved into stable accommodation within six months. The council’s rough sleeping co-ordinator, Louis Colley, told the publication that the service had accelerated processes including opening bank accounts and obtaining benefits and identification.

The Design Council’s 2022 Design Value Framework included ProxyAddress as a case study, citing partnerships with Barclays and Monzo as helping improve financial inclusion, and with Ordnance Survey and HM Land Registry as helping to harness address data to create social impact. It also reported on ProxyAddress's impact on financial-inclusion practices internationally and the development of related interventions in France and Ireland.

In a 2023 interview with Wallpaper*, Hildrey described ProxyAddress as a broadening of architectural practice through the design of systems rather than physical objects.

== Writing, teaching and advisory work ==
Hildrey contributed the chapter "Design for Homelessness" to Architects After Architecture: Alternative Pathways for Practice, published by Routledge in 2020.

He is a professional examiner at the Bartlett School of Architecture, University College London, an associate lecturer in the Department of Design at Goldsmiths, University of London, and a trustee of the Museum of Architecture. He has also been a visiting critic at the Architectural Association School of Architecture.

In 2024, he was named a Design Council Expert and an industry champion at the Creative Industries Policy and Evidence Centre (Creative PEC). The networks provide specialist advice and professional insight to inform design and creative-industries policy.

He is also a member of the Glorious 42 (G42), an expert board established in 2025 by the Bureau of European Design Associations as part of its MADres programme to support design-led innovation and sustainable transformation across Europe.

== Awards and exhibitions ==
Hildrey was named among the RIBA Journal’s Rising Stars in 2018 and shortlisted for the Arts Foundation's 2019 Experimental Architecture award. ProxyAddress received a Wood Pencil in the Humanitarian Aid category at the 2018 D&AD Impact Awards.

In November 2018, ProxyAddress was exhibited at the Architectural Association as part of a presentation of the four practices shortlisted for the Arts Foundation's 2019 Experimental Architecture award.

ProxyAddress was exhibited in the architecture category of Beazley Designs of the Year 2019, the Design Museum's annual exhibition and awards programme showcasing design from the preceding year. It was subsequently included in Time’s Best Inventions of 2021. Camille Walala selected it for The Guardian’s best designs of 2022.

In February 2022, Hildrey was a speaker at The World Around Summit at the Solomon R. Guggenheim Museum in New York. His work is held in the permanent collections of the Victoria and Albert Museum and the Design Museum.

In 2023 he received the Freedom of the City of London.
