= Gaslight Square, St. Louis =

Former district of St. Louis, Missouri

Gaslight Square
- Former district
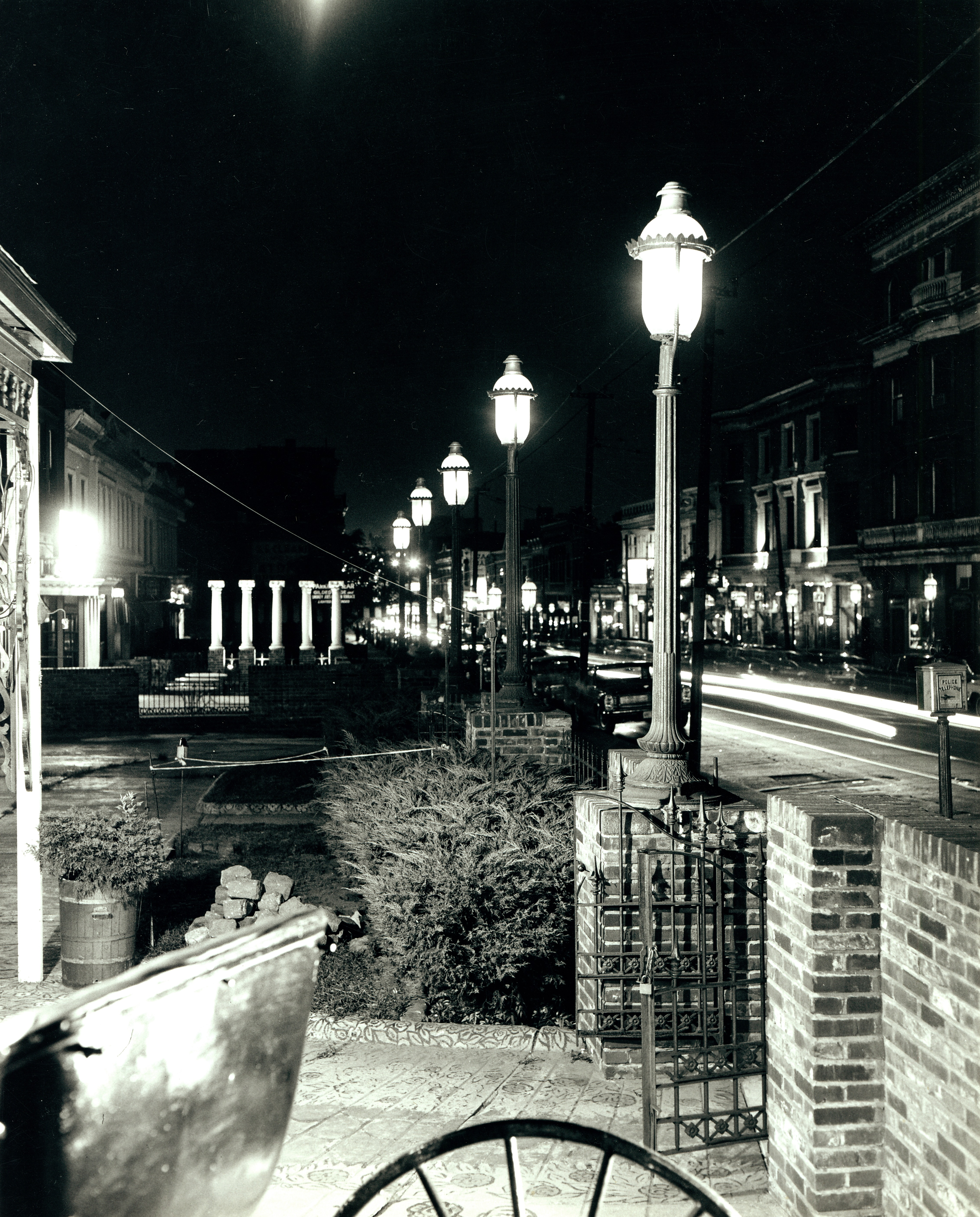
- Olive East From Boyle, Gaslight Square, 1966
- Interactive map of Gaslight Square
- Coordinates: 38.6454°N 90.2486°W
- Country: United States
- State: Missouri
- City: St. Louis
- Officially renamed: 24 March 1961
- Officially retired: December 1972

Gaslight Square (also known as Greenwich Corners) was an entertainment district in St. Louis, Missouri active in the 1950s and 60s, covering an area of about three blocks at the intersection of Olive and Boyle, near the eastern part of the current Central West End and close to the current Grand Center Arts District. The district was known for its gas streetlamps and ornate Victorian-style architecture, and was home to many popular clubs, restaurants, and entertainment venues. It contained around 50 businesses at its height.

== History ==
Before its heyday, the district was home to several antique shops. Especially in its early days, it was associated with beatnik and other countercultural elements. It was kick-started in the aftermath of the city's 1959 tornado outbreak, which caused severe property damage but also led to an influx of attention and insurance money. Business owners took advantage of this to revitalize the local economy: Jimmy Massuci, Jay Landesman, and brothers Dick and Paul Mutrux in particular were credited with instigating development. Massuci opened several night spots in the district, Landesman chose it as the new home for his Crystal Palace cabaret theater, and the Mutrux brothers owned the Gaslight Bar. The St. Louis Board of Aldermen officially renamed the district on 24 March 1961. By 1962, property values in Gaslight Square had tripled.

A 1962 episode of the American TV drama Route 66 titled "Hey Moth, Come Eat the Flame" was set and filmed inside The Darkside jazz club.

Gaslight Square was the location of the studios of KDNA, an early community radio station with a countercultural ethos which played music, poetry and spoken word, interviewed musicians, poets, and artists, and ran anti-war and leftist political content. It was a predecessor to the community radio music station KDHX.

=== Decline ===
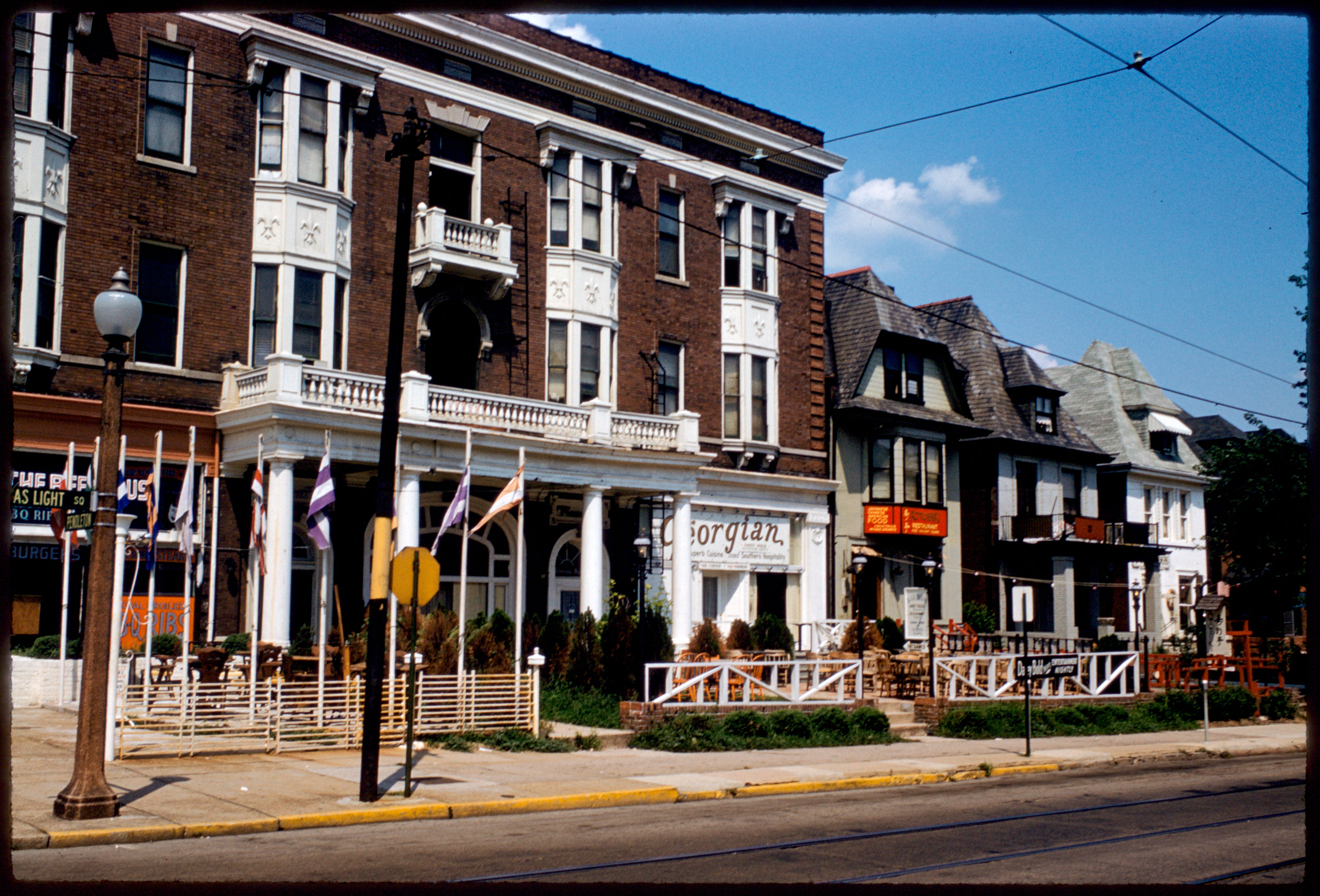
Gaslight Square in August 1962

The district's decline in the late 1960s was attributed to several factors, including fear of crime, hostility to racial integration, and excessive commercialization. The 1964 murder of Lilliian Heller in particular was described as foreshadowing the end. Its last remaining pub, O'Connell's, moved from Boyle to Kingshighway in 1972, and the Board of Aldermen officially retired the name in December of that year.

Many of Gaslight Square's gas lamps were sold to Six Flags during the construction of Six Flags St. Louis in the late 1960s, for use in the park's Missouri section (now 1904 World's Fair). Most of them are still in use.

By the late 1990s, most of the buildings were long gone; those that remained stood open and rapidly deteriorating. For the 20–30 years, the district was almost completely vacant, with many empty lots and the remaining building dilapidated and empty.

In 2005, many properties within Gaslight Square were bought by the development company RJK Inc. 150 units were planned, mostly condominia. The new residential properties were meant to sell in the 280k-600k price-range. As of 2008, the vacant lots and condemned buildings are no more. The district is a mixed density residential community with new single family, row homes, small apartments, and condos.

== Architecture and businesses ==
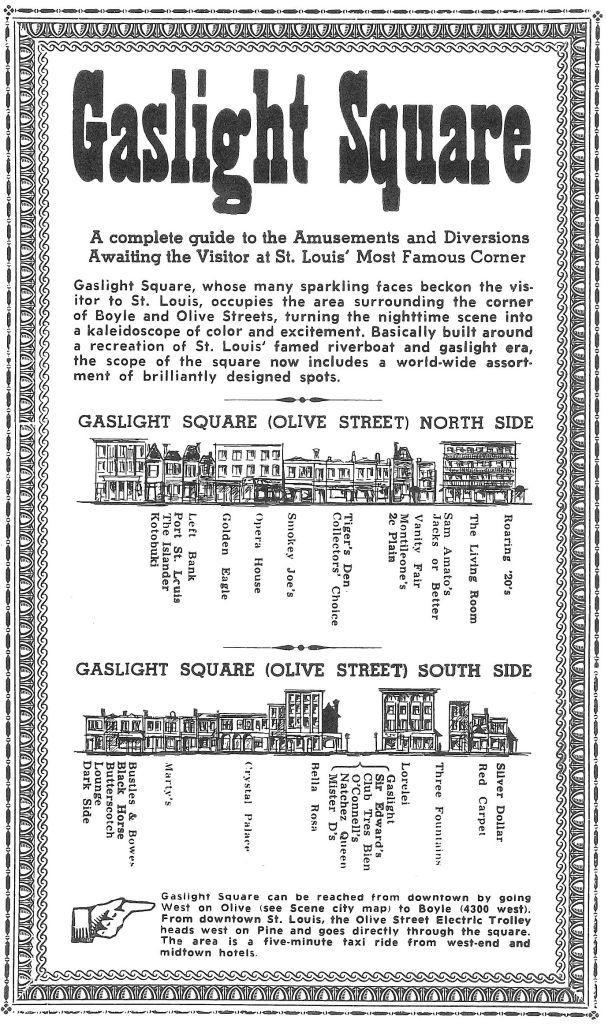
Map of the district in May 1964

The district's architecture drew inspiration from the city's steamboat era. Early business owners in Gaslight Square repurposed items salvaged from recently demolished properties in downtown St. Louis such as church pews, chandeliers, stained glass, and marble bathtubs.

Traditional jazz clubs in Gaslight Square included Peacock Alley and the Opera House. Modern jazz clubs included the Dark Side. Restaurants included Smokey Joe’s Grecian Terrace and the Golden Eagle Saloon. The Laughing Buddha was a coffeehouse that featured live folk music.

== Notable performers and patrons ==
The district was known as a hub of music, comedy, dance, and other entertainment, and many of its regulars would go on to achieve popular recognition. Notable musicians included Miles Davis, Bob Dylan, Barbra Streisand, Judy Collins, Peter Yarrow, Singleton Palmer, James Crutchfield, Bob Kuban, the Quartette Trés Bien, and Jeanne Trevor. Comedians and entertainers included Jerry Stiller, Jackie Mason, the Smothers Brothers, Lenny Bruce, Dick Gregory, Nichols and May, Irwin Corey, Woody Allen, Phyllis Diller, and Jack E. Leonard. The district was also visited by poets and writers like Jack Kerouac and Allen Ginsberg.

== Legacy ==
There is a small memorial at the intersection of Olive and Boyle, featuring some decorative columns like those that used to be on the street and a wall with a stone plaque with names of people and establishments from Gaslight Square's past, topped with a few sections of modest cornices of former buildings from the district.

Some of the significant architectural elements from Gaslight Square were preserved by the National Building Arts Center in the Metro East area of Greater St. Louis.

The Gaslight Theater is located in and named after the former square.

Two documentaries were produced about Gaslight Square in the early 2000s. Gaslight Square: The Forgotten Landmark (Bruce Marren/2002) explores the history by the people who developed the area. It includes interviews with the Smothers Brothers, Jay Landesman, Bob Kuban, and many others. Gaslight Square: The Legend Lives On (Bruce Marren/2005) looks at the influence it had on the city, uncovers relics, and what has happened to it today. It includes interviews with Phyllis Diller, Billy Peek, Jonnie King, and many others.

In 2024, Jazz St. Louis and St. Louis Dance Theatre produced a version of The Nutcracker set in Gaslight Square, set to Duke Ellington's jazz interpretations of the music.

== See also ==
- Laclede Gas Company, the local utility company, founded as a provider of gas light
- Streetcars in St. Louis, streetcar service ran through Gaslight Square
