= KFUO =

KFUO may refer to:

- KFUO (AM), a radio station (850 AM) licensed to Clayton, Missouri, United States
- KFUO-FM, a former radio station (99.1 FM) licensed to Clayton, Missouri, United States
