= Sex and Broadcasting =

Works about Community Broadcasting:

- Sex and Broadcasting (1971 book), by Lorenzo Milam
- Sex and Broadcasting (2014 documentary), about WFMU
