= KZUM =

- Lincoln, Nebraska; United States
- Broadcast area: Lincoln area
- Frequency: 89.3 MHz (HD Radio)
- Branding: Community Radio

Programming
- Format: Variety

Ownership
- Owner: Sunrise Communications, Inc.

History
- First air date: February 14, 1978

Technical information
- Licensing authority: FCC
- Facility ID: 63955
- Class: A
- ERP: 1,500 watts
- HAAT: 31.0 meters (101.7 ft)
- Transmitter coordinates: 40°48′47.00″N 96°42′24.00″W

Links
- Public license information: Public file; LMS
- Webcast: Listen live
- Website: kzum.org

KZUM (89.3 FM) is a radio station licensed to Lincoln, Nebraska, United States. The station serves the Lincoln area and is currently owned by Sunrise Communications, Inc. It features a variety of programming, including jazz, blues, folk music, funk, soul and bluegrass, as well as a variety of locally and nationally focused news and talk programs. KZUM has the distinction of being the first non-profit community radio station in Nebraska.

== History ==
In January 1973, several community activists from Lincoln (Ron Kurtenbach, Tom Gedwillo, Mike Carper, Mason Youngman, Dave Luebbert, Greg Preston and Bill Laughlin) formed Sunrise Communications, a non-profit corporation. Through fundraising and word-of-mouth, the necessary monies for a Federal Communications Commission (FCC) application were obtained and filed in early 1974. KZUM first broadcast in 1978 after negotiating over signal interference with Omaha TV station WOWT.

The station was a part of a nationwide community radio movement of the 1960s and 70s. Radio activist Lorenzo Milam and engineer Jeremy Lansman contributed to the creation of KZUM.

Several buildings housed the station until it located to its present studio and offices on South 48th Street. KZUM used to be carried on Lincoln's Time Warner cable TV system. When Charter Spectrum acquired Time Warner and transitioned Lincoln’s network to an all-digital system, they systematically eliminated unencrypted analog tiers. This process cleared out older local FM radio simulcasts. Along with its standard FM signal, KZUM is streamed worldwide at its website, and via third-party aggregators like TuneIn and Radio Garden.

The Listener Subscribers used to Elect the Board of Directors of KZUM Sunrise Communications, but these voting rights were abolished in 2013 by the vote of the membership. This was primarily due to concerns that people who did not agree with the mission of KZUM might try to take over the station by becoming members and using those voting rights to establish a contrary agenda.

== Programming ==
KZUM is powered by over 100 volunteer programmers, 7 days a week. Several programmers have been with KZUM virtually since its inception including Eric Bachenberg, John 'The Wagonmaster' Schmitz, Jim Anderson, and Hardy Holm. Bachenberg's The Exposition Flyer features folk music. Anderson hosted Another Blue Monday in the 1980s and 1990s and has had a variety of blues programs under many names over the years, including today's Blues Oasis. Holm brought local music to the airwaves as well as a popular Beatles show Strawberry Fields.

John "The Wagonmaster" Schmitz, as of April 2021, has been inducted into the Nebraska Performing Arts Hall of Fame, with over 40 years of dedicated service to KZUM and the community of Lincoln, Nebraska.

== See also ==
- List of community radio stations in the United States
