= Larry Giles =

American historical preservationist and architectural salvager (1947–2021)

Larry Wayne Giles
- Born: November 1, 1947; St. Louis, Missouri
- Died: June 12, 2021 (aged 73)
- Organization: National Building Arts Center
- Known for: Architectural preservation and salvage, research library
- Website: nationalbuildingarts.org

Larry Giles (November 1, 1947 – June 12, 2021) was an American historical preservationist and pioneering architectural salvager who founded the National Building Arts Center. He was also an important figure in the operations of the early community radio station, KDNA, a predecessor to KDHX.

== Death ==
Giles died of complications due to leukemia on June 12, 2021.

== See also ==
- Bob Cassilly
