= Jeanne Trevor =

St. Louis jazz vocalist (1937 or 1938–2022)

- Trevor performing at the Black Horse Pub in 1964; photograph by Thelma Blumberg

Background information
- Born: 1937 or 1938; New York City, US
- Died: October 24, 2022 (aged 84) Ferguson, Missouri, US
- Genres: Jazz; opera; gospel; R&B
- Labels: Gaslight Records, Norman Records, Mainstream Records, Catalyst Productions, ei Productions
- Formerly of: St. Louis Jazz Quartet

Jeanne Trevor (1937 or 1938 – October 24, 2022) was an American vocalist known as the "First Lady of St. Louis Jazz". Originally from Harlem, New York City, she moved to St. Louis in the early 1960s to perform in the nascent Gaslight Square district. She became a prominent figure in Gaslight, playing most of its top jazz clubs. In the 1970s she was a member of the internationally touring St. Louis Jazz Quartet. Best known as a jazz vocalist, she preferred not to describe herself as one; her other influences included opera, gospel, and R&B. She died in Ferguson, Missouri, at the age of 84. She remained relatively unknown outside of St. Louis.

== Biography ==
Trevor was born in Harlem, near the edge of its Hispanic quarter. (Note: Dennis Owsley claims she was originally from New Jersey; however, this is not supported elsewhere.^{:80}) Her father was a singer and guitarist originally from Richmond, Virginia. She heard a wide variety of music at the Apollo Theater as a child during the venue's famed Amateur Night. After graduating high school, she moved to California with her family and majored in drama at Los Angeles City College, working as a secretary to pay for her education. She first sang professionally in San Francisco and Los Angeles.

Trevor had a minor role in The Oregon Trail (1959).

Trevor's family again moved to St. Louis in the early 1960s on the suggestion of a friend of her cousin. During her time in Gaslight Square, she performed at locations including the Black Horse Pub, Vanity Fair, Le Jazz Hot, and the Crystal Palace; she also recorded singles for Norman Wienstroer's labels Norman and Gaslight Records. She was posthumously labeled a "giant" of the short-lived entertainment district.

The cover of Trevor's 1965 album, which erroneously spells her name as "Jeannie"

In 1965, Trevor recorded the album Pow! Jeannie [sic] Trevor Sings for Mainstream Records, backed by saxophonist Hugh "Peanuts" Whalum and the Quartette Trés Bien.^{:80} She was irritated by the misspelling of her name and the fact that the album cover did not feature her photo. It saw little commercial success.

In 1967, Trevor became a DJ at then-radio station KADI.

In 1969 and throughout the 1970s, Trevor was a member of the St. Louis Jazz Quartet, which visited Australia, Alaska, Senegal, and Turin and performed with the St. Louis Symphony Orchestra. The group recorded a self-titled album for ei Productions in 1972.^{:93}

In 1999, Trevor recorded the album Love You Madly for Catalyst Productions, featuring saxophonist Willie Akins. It featured songs from a range of genres, including jazz, blues, bossa nova, and gospel.^{:130}

Trevor continued to perform locally in St. Louis well into her old age. She appeared in 22 musical productions at The Muny from 1986 to 2011. She had heart disease later in life due to secondhand smoke exposure, eventually requiring bypass surgery. She died in a Ferguson hospital on October 24, 2022, at the age of 84.

== Influences ==
Though she was known as the "First Lady of St. Louis Jazz", Trevor preferred not to call herself a jazz vocalist, describing herself instead as a "modern American singer" and a "musical actor". She had originally wanted to become an opera singer, but failed to find opportunities in the US due to her race. She cited Dinah Washington, Billie Holiday, Nancy Wilson, and Ella Fitzgerald as influences.

== Awards and honors ==
Trevor received a Lifetime Achievement Award at Grand Center's Sixth Annual Visionary Awards in 2008. She received an Award for Lifetime Achievement in the Arts at the 2009 St. Louis Arts Awards, which are sponsored by the Arts and Education Council of St. Louis. She was nominated for the Riverfront Times' 2009 Music Awards in the category "Best Jazz Artist". In 2010, she became an inaugural member of the Ferguson Walk of Fame, which honors people born or living in Ferguson.

== Discography ==
=== Albums ===
- Pow! Jeannie Trevor Sings (1965)
- St. Louis Jazz Quartet (1972)
- Love You Madly (1999)
