= KPOO =

Community radio station in San Francisco

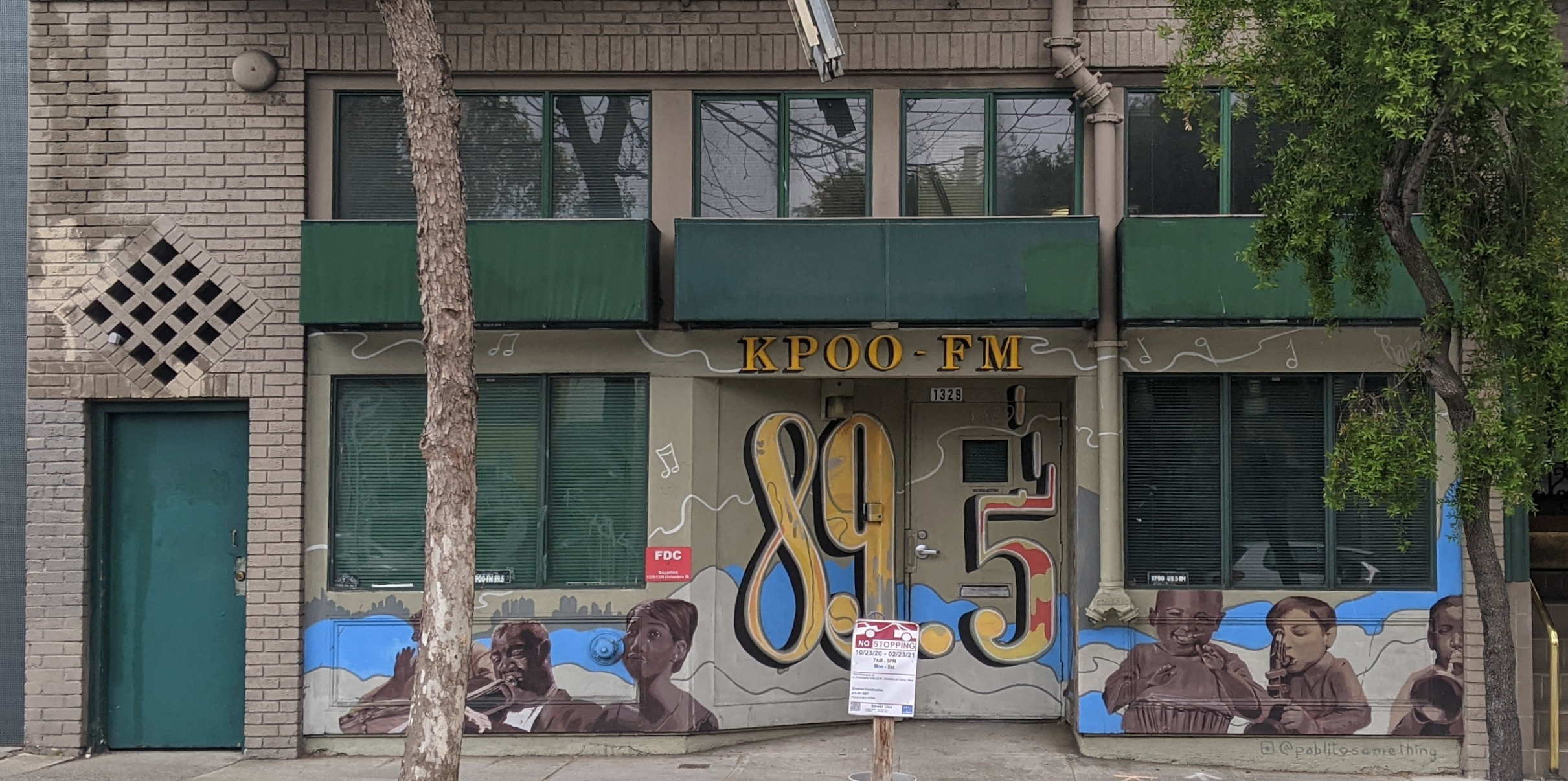
- KPOO headquarters (2021)
- San Francisco, California; United States
- Broadcast area: San Francisco Bay Area
- Frequency: 89.5 MHz
- Branding: Community Radio

Programming
- Format: Variety

Ownership
- Owner: Poor People's Radio, Inc.

History
- First air date: June 6, 1972
- Call sign meaning: Poor People's Radio

Technical information
- Licensing authority: FCC
- Facility ID: 53008
- Class: A
- ERP: 270 watts
- HAAT: 165 meters (541 ft)
- Transmitter coordinates: 37°47′33.00″N 122°24′52.00″W

Links
- Public license information: Public file; LMS
- Webcast: Listen live
- Website: kpoo.com

KPOO (89.5 FM) is a community radio station licensed to San Francisco, California, United States. The station is owned by Poor People's Radio. It broadcasts from a building in the Fillmore district.

Poor People's Radio was conceived of and named by a radio engineer, Meyer Gottesman. Meyer determined that the frequency was available and applied for a construction permit from the FCC. Upon the application, Meyer advertised for community involvement in the Berkeley Barb newspaper. After three community meetings, the concept had "legs" as shown by a turn out of over 100 community activists at a church at the corner of Oak and Baker Streets in San Francisco. It is one of the many stations operated by community broadcasters Lorenzo Milam and Jeremy Lansman. The station broadcasts meetings of various local governing bodies as well as different and varied music shows.

== Programming ==
KPOO features music and talk radio from local community activists. The music originally featured was jazz, blues and R&B from the 1950s, 1960s and 1970s.

In the summer of 1982, KPOO started playing Rap Music on Sunday afternoons from 3pm-7pm with DJ LeBaron Lord King. LeBaron had spent the previous two summer's in NY City listening to Mr. Magic on WHBI and WBLS. Thursday, Friday and Saturday nights at the Harlem World Club and watching Albert King, Bernard King, Earl "Fly" Williams and others' play summer basketball.

Acts like Run-DMC, Public Enemy, World Class Wreckin' Crew, Egyptian Lover, Roxanne Shante, and a young LL Cool J all appeared on the station's airwaves.

KPOO now broadcasts local public commentaries and talk programs with community and national Black leaders discussing what's going on in the Black community locally and nationally. The focus on the community continues with commentaries on a variety of talk and music programs. Some of the featured music programming includes salsa, jazz, blues, rap/hip hop, Latin, gospel and reggae, a jazz program with Wanika Stephens of the St. John Coltrane African Orthodox Church, as well as an American Indian talk/music program.

== KPOO Special Guest ==
Throughout the years KPOO has given many artist their breaks including:

- Public Enemy
- Bob Marley
- Run-DMC
- Too $hort
- MC Hammer
- E-40
- Eric B and Rakim
- Mac-P
- Marcus Orelias

== Funding ==
The radio station seeks funding from the government, grants, and hosts fundraisers.

== See also ==
- List of community radio stations in the United States
