= KOPN =

Community radio station in Columbia, Missouri

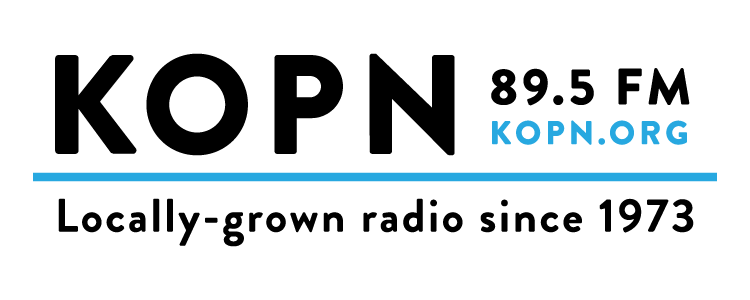

Columbia, Missouri; United States
- Broadcast area: Columbia metropolitan area
- Frequency: 89.5 MHz
- Branding: KOPN 89.5 FM

Programming
- Format: Variety
- Affiliations: NPR; Pacifica Radio; Public Radio Exchange

Ownership
- Owner: New Wave Corporation

History
- First air date: March 3, 1973

Technical information
- Licensing authority: FCC
- Facility ID: 48674
- Class: C2
- ERP: 36,000 watts
- HAAT: 72.0 meters (236.2 ft)
- Transmitter coordinates: 38°59′53.00″N 92°11′48.00″W

Links
- Public license information: Public file; LMS
- Webcast: Listen live
- Website: www.kopn.org

KOPN (89.5 FM) is a non-profit community radio station in Columbia, Missouri, which from its start was modeled on the progressive radio format of KPFA in Berkeley, California. The station relies heavily on volunteers for programming and also carries programming from National Public Radio, Public Radio Exchange, and Pacifica radio.

The station went on the air in 1973, becoming the eighth open-access, listener-supported station in the U.S. and the first to serve an audience of less than 100,000 people.

== History ==
The station traces its roots to a November 1971 meeting at The Issue, an alternative newspaper in Columbia. They picked the call sign KOPN to commemorate its openness to all. KOPN was founded as a project of the New Wave Corporation whose initial directors were Patricia Mae Watkins, Gerald Keliher, Harry Pearle, and Kathy Bierbach all of whom signed the initial incorporation papers. Keliher was the station's first manager, Pearle was the first chief engineer, Watkins was the first program director, and Bierbach was the first news director. The first music director was Jeff Mintz. Most of the incorporators had worked together on various alternative newspapers prior to starting KOPN.

The station received its FCC Construction Permit and officially began broadcasting at 10watts on March 3, 1973. It broadcast a monaural signal and operated out of a studio and office space shared with the Columbia Community Grocery, a natural food cooperative, on the second floor of 915 East Broadway. The food co-op left that building in the mid-1970's but KOPN programming still originates from that address. In its first 2 months it had $340.81 in cash and $200 in subscriptions. It broadcast from atop the newly opened 15-story Paquin Tower adjoining the University of Missouri campus and Columbia's second tallest building and highest above average terrain.

In the planning stages the radio received assistance from KDNA personnel Jeremy Lansman and Lorenzo Milam who had started similarly formatted KDNA in St. Louis. KDNA had already financial failed by the time KOPN went on the air. KOPN acquired KDNA's the 20 kW CCA transmitter and in 1974 began broadcasting at 40,000 watts and moved its frequency from 89.7 MHz to 89.5 MHz.

From its earliest years, the station has hosted locally produced radio plays. In 1979 it created the Midwest Radio Theatre project, partially funded by a modest National Endowment for the Arts Services to the Field grant. The station produced and hosted the first week-long [Midwest Radio Theatre Workshop] (MRTW) in 1980. Jim Jordan, the golden age radio star of "Fibber McGee and Molly" was the first guest host and keynote speaker. MRTW continued as an annual live radio performance and radio drama training event for over 2 decades in Columbia. Later it was incorporated as a separate 501(c)(3) non-profit named the National Audio Theatre Festival (NATF) the performance and training event was moved to West Plains, Missouri. Today, NATF has evolved into the annual Hear Now Festival , which features public listening sessions and performances by many renowned audio performance producers in Kansas City, Missouri .

In 1977, KOPN's parent, The New Wave Corporation, sought to bring public television and PBS programming to Columbia. The University of Missouri owns and operates full power TV station KOMU as a commercial NBC affiliate and not a public television station and thus there was no public TV signal available in mid-Missouri. New Wave was granted a construction permit and the call letters K56AU. Two attempts were made to re-broadcast PTV signals, first from KETC, St Louis, with a series of microwave relay towers which was only marginally successful. Later New Wave built a huge custom engineered UHF receiving antenna atop the Paquin High Rise building (affectionately called "The Fence" by the group of volunteer engineers who constructed the thing) to receive a public television station signal from Kansas City, KCPT. This actually worked for about a year but K56AU's low power TV signal reached only an 11–mile radius from its tower and was hampered by frequent outages. After a major ice and windstorm destroyed the antenna, New Wave Corp. abandoned the station, K56AU eventually was licensed to Trinity Broadcast Network. and operated as a repeater for Trinity's religious programming.

In 1984 the station entered an agreement with the University of Missouri to move its transmitter from Paquin Tower to a 200-foot tower on land owned by the University on Route Z, several miles north of downtown Columbia. Its power was reduced from 40 kW ERP to its present 36 kW ERP. This move came after years of unsuccessful attempts by the university to get the FCC to either revoke or significantly modify KOPN's license to broadcast with 40 kW ERP at the Paquin Tower location. The university claimed that RF interference from KOPN caused problems for operations and experiments at its nearby Chemistry and Physics buildings. After spending far more on legal fees in its unsuccessful efforts with the FCC than it actually cost to move the facilities, the university finally offered to pay to move the station's transmitting facilities to its current location on Route Z.

While some of the station's public affairs offerings in the 1970s tended to be leftist/progressive, it carried programs from many other points of view, as well. It was one of only two stations in Missouri to carry the far right 5-minute daily program "This is Liberty Lobby" which concluded with an invitation to get the group's "America First" publication.

In February 1981 the station received extensive publicity after escapees from the Missouri State Penitentiary in Jefferson City, Missouri called the station's Zebra Sunrise show aimed at inmates to complain about prison conditions.

In a wink to its progressive history the station on April Fools' Day in 1981 joked that it would cancel "Zebra Sunrise" which had been deemed moral trash by the Moral Majority, begin producing anti-Communist programs, increase its religious programming by 50 percent, offer Paul Harvey, Phyllis Schlafly, William Buckley and Jerry Falwell as commentators and that "Liberty Lobby will be aired morning, noon and night."

In 1996 the station became associated with National Public Radio. While this brought some federal grants to the station it also put it in direct competition with the University of Missouri-owned NPR radio station KBIA for the same subscribers and division of federal grants. The NPR affiliation also meant increased costs for membership. At the time KBIA did not broadcast the entire NPR offering, particularly talk shows, as KBIA broadcast classical music instead. This led to an initial scheduling battle as KBIA increased its talk time.

The station has gone through economic issues including in 1984, 1991 (when it almost lost its lease), and in 1994 (when it gave up its weekly bingo fundraiser). In 2017-2018 it went through another crisis because of proposed cuts in federal grants to public broadcasting entities, particularly its main grant source from the Corporation for Public Broadcasting. Estimates in the small market of Columbia is that it has "2,000-3,000 listeners per week and roughly 800 listener-sponsors." In 2018 its budget was $200,000. For a time, KOPN loaned its online store sales to women in developing nations, working with Kiva (organization) which specializes in funding loans to entrepreneurs in the developing world (this was seen as a way to support others in need, with no actual cost to the station).

Records and audio recordings of its programs from its founding through 1999 are now housed at the State Historical Society of Missouri in Columbia.

== See also ==
- List of community radio stations in the United States
