= RM-2493 =

Controversial proposal submitted to the Federal Communications Commission

RM-2493 was the title of a rule-making proposal made to the Federal Communications Commission (FCC) in 1974. It has since been the subject of an ongoing urban legend (sometimes being called Petition 2493).

== Origin ==
In 1974, Jeremy Lansman and Lorenzo Milam submitted a request to the FCC to amend the rules concerning educational broadcasts. They requested a review be made to determine if any religious groups were filing for licenses on channels that had been reserved for general educational purposes with the intent of making religious broadcasts. The FCC reviewed this request and denied it in 1975, citing it did not have a policy on restricting broadcasts based on possible religious content. Thereafter, the matter was officially ended.

During the time the matter was being considered, the FCC received numerous letters concerning this proposal. Many of the correspondents were under the incorrect impression that the proposal was seeking a complete ban on all religious broadcasting. The FCC explained that that possibility had never been suggested and was not being considered. Following the denial of RM-2493, the FCC went on to explain that there now was no longer any proposal being considered.

== Variations ==
These statements did not stop the concern of some citizens. Messages were circulating on the Internet as late as September 2012 stating that a ban on religious broadcasting was either being actively considered or has been recently enacted. Variations of this message state that atheists are circulating a petition in support of the ban; that religious people are circulating a petition to oppose the ban; that Madalyn Murray O'Hair is responsible for the ban (O'Hair had no association with RM-2493 and died in 1995); that James Dobson is leading opposition to the ban (Dobson has stated he is aware there is no proposed ban and has not led any efforts in regard to it); and that the ban was responsible for the cancellation of the television series Touched by an Angel. The FCC states that it has received over 30,000,000 pieces of mail regarding this issue since 1975.

A 2009 variation of Petition 2493 (without the RM- prefix) claims O'Hair's organization, American Atheists, wants the "Removal of Joel Osteen, Joyce Meyer, Charles Stanley, David Jeremiah and other pastors from the air waves," and Dobson asks petitioners to send responses and donations to "Lisa Norman". Once again, Dobson denies any involvement.
