= K297BI =

Classical music radio station in St. Louis

Relays WFUN-HD2, St. Louis
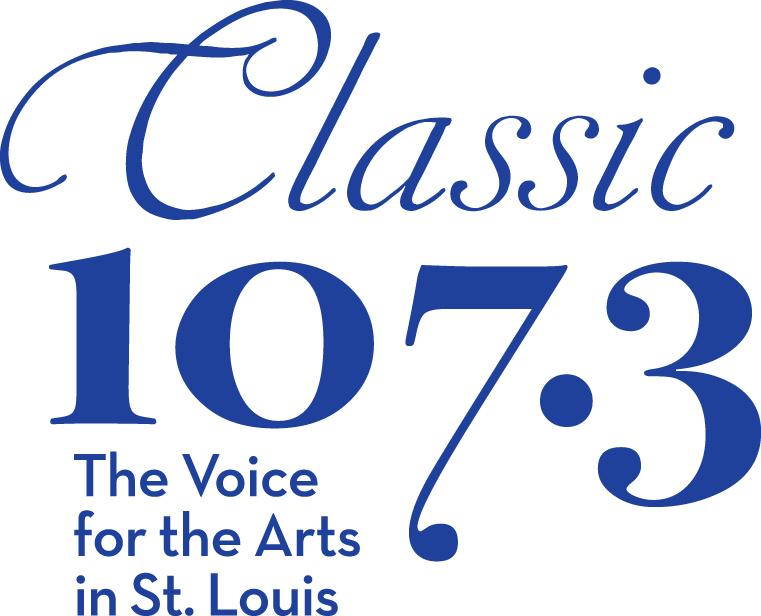
- St. Louis, Missouri; United States
- Broadcast area: Greater St. Louis
- Frequency: 107.3 MHz FM or (96.3-HD2) MHz (HD Radio)
- Branding: Classic 107.3

Programming
- Format: Classical music

Ownership
- Owner: Radio Arts Foundation–Saint Louis
- Sister stations: WFUN-FM

History
- First air date: April 8, 2013

Technical information
- Licensing authority: FCC
- Facility ID: 139987
- Class: D
- ERP: 250 watts
- HAAT: 139 meters (456 ft)
- Transmitter coordinates: 38°36′47″N 90°20′09″W

Links
- Public license information: Public file; LMS
- Webcast: Listen live
- Website: classic1073.org

K297BI (107.3 MHz) (Classic 107.3) is an FM radio station in St. Louis, Missouri, branded as "Classic 107.3" and owned and operated by the nonprofit Radio Arts Foundation–St. Louis. The station's studios are located in Clayton, Missouri.

The station is dedicated to the classical music format and its hosts include Gavriel Savit, Kathy Lawton Brown, Tom Sudholt, and Julie Schuster.

Classical programming on K297BI is also broadcast on the HD Radio channel 96.3 WFUN-FM-HD2, also operated by the Radio Arts Foundation.

== History ==
RAF STL logo used until rebranding to Classic 107.3

KFUO-FM 99.1, which had broadcast classical music to St. Louis since 1948, was owned by the Lutheran Church–Missouri Synod and became available for sale in 2009. In the name of the Radio Arts Foundation, Jim Connett, program director at KFUO, and Michael Neidorff, CEO of the Centene Corporation, made a purchase proposal for KFUO that was rejected by the synod board member and paid negotiator Kermit Brashear. The foundation immediately began plans for a new classical station, even before the Classic 99 format ceased analog operations and became available by webstream only.

KFUO was sold to Gateway Creative Broadcasting in March 2010, as approved by the Federal Communications Commission (FCC) in May. After announcing that the station would broadcast contemporary Christian music and be branded as Joy FM, Classic 99 ended its 62-year classical music format at 10 p.m. on July 6, 2010 after playing Beethoven's Ninth Symphony. St. Louis was without a full-time classical station from 2010 to 2013.

The Centene Charitable Foundation provided the Radio Arts Foundation a $1 million startup grant for the new station, and FCC Form 350 was filed for the translator station February 1, 2013, which was to be owned and operated by the Radio Arts Foundation–St. Louis, with Connett as general manager. Approval was announced March 7, 2013.

After a week of signal testing, RAF-STL Classical debuted on 107.3 K297BI and 96.3 KIHT-HD2 at 10 a.m. on April 8, 2013, with Beethoven's Ninth Symphony. Connett remarked, "This is truly a dream come true.... Building this new station from the ground up has been a labor of love."

The station features classical programming such as Exploring Music with Bill McGlaughlin, Concierto, and Classics 4 Kids. It obtained a significant music collection by partnering to download the libraries of KFUO and of WRR-FM, Dallas Classical 101.1.

== On-air staff ==
An experienced staff of former KFUO Classic 99 employees and other radio industry professionals manage the day-to-day operations of RAF-STL.

- Kathy Lawton Brown
- Gavriel Savit
- Julie Schuster
- Tom Sudholt
