= ProxyAddress =

Service providing postal addresses for homeless people

ProxyAddress Ltd is a social enterprise service which enables the use of an alias address to be used for the purposes of connecting those facing homelessness with support, independent of location.

ProxyAddress involves the use of a secure database comprising the address, associated username, current residence (if any), and the history of each user's account. Homeless people can use the ProxyAddress to provide consistent details to suppliers of key support services, thereby retaining or regaining access. Users are able to update their location and details online, via email, or by text message.

Mail sent to a postal address allocated by the ProxyAddress system would be redirected to wherever the person might be staying — or even to somewhere that they could visit to collect their post.

== Origins ==
ProxyAddress was created by Chris Hildrey, an architect from Liverpool, United Kingdom, while a designers in residence at the Design Museum, London in 2017. As a result of research undertaken during this residency, it was discovered that access to governmental and private sector services or support is generally placed out of reach once a person is made homeless owing to a lack of permanent address.

== Awards and partnerships ==
From April 2017 to December 2017, ProxyAddress was created by Chris Hildrey as part of the Arts Council England-funded Designers in Residence programme at the Design Museum, London. The project was subsequently exhibited at the Design Museum for four months from January 2018 to April 2018.

In September 2018, ProxyAddress received the backing of the UK Government through the Geovation Programme, an Ordnance Survey initiative dedicated to supporting the innovative use of property and location data in partnership with HM Land Registry. The same month, ProxyAddress won a pencil at the Design and Art Direction (D&AD) Impact Awards in the Humanitarian Aid category and was awarded a seed grant from the Royal Society of Arts.

In November 2018, ProxyAddress was exhibited at the Architectural Association, London as part of the Pushing the Boundaries exhibition which accompanied the Arts Foundation awards for Experimental Architecture.

In December 2018, ProxyAddress was awarded the 2018 Royal Institute of British Architects' President's Medal for Research which celebrates the best global research in the fields of architecture and the built environment.

Also in December 2018, Wired UK named ProxyAddress one of the '18 things that made the world a better place in 2018'.

In February 2019, ProxyAddress was selected as part of the inaugural cohort of the Royal Society of Arts' Economic Impact Accelerator in partnership with the Mastercard Center for Inclusive Growth.

In September 2019, ProxyAddress was shortlisted for the Beazley Designs of the Year 2019 in the architecture category. An accompanying exhibition is currently hosted at the Design Museum, London.

ProxyAddress is partnered with multiple stakeholders across the Government, charity, and finance sectors, including: Monzo, Crisis, The Big Issue, Ordnance Survey, HM Land Registry, the Royal Society of Arts and Mastercard Center for Inclusive Growth.
