= KLJT =

Community radio station in St. Louis

- St. Louis, Missouri; United States
- Broadcast area: Greater St. Louis
- Frequency: 88.1 MHz (HD Radio)
- Branding: 88.1 Worship One

Programming
- Format: Worship music

Ownership
- Owner: Gateway Creative Broadcasting; (Gateway Creative Broadcasting, Inc.)
- Sister stations: KLJY; KNBS; KQBS; KXBS

History
- First air date: October 14, 1987
- Former call signs: KDHX (1987–2025)
- Call sign meaning: Disambiguation of KLJY

Technical information
- Licensing authority: FCC
- Facility ID: 17380
- Class: C1
- ERP: 42,000 watts
- HAAT: 225 meters (740 ft)
- Transmitter coordinates: 38.417°N 90.433°W

Links
- Public license information: Public file; LMS
- Webcast: Listen live
- Website: worshipone.com

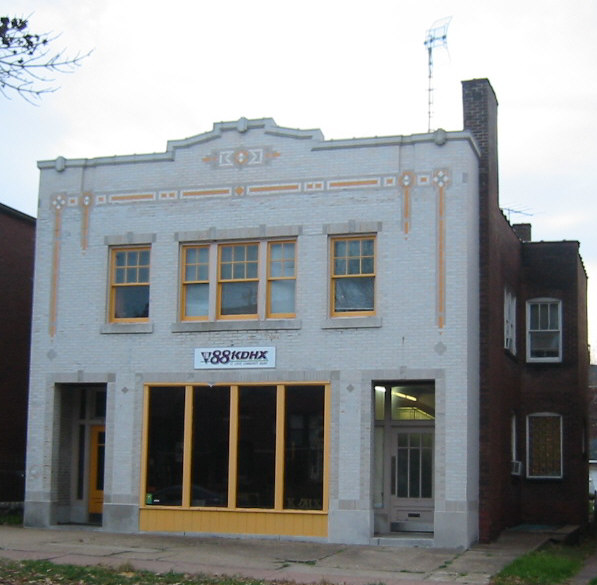
Former KDHX station building

KLJT (88.1 FM, "88.1 Worship One") is a non-commercial radio station licensed to serve St. Louis, Missouri. Owned by Gateway Creative Broadcasting, it broadcasts a contemporary worship music format. The station is headquartered alongside its sister stations at studios on Manchester Road in Des Peres, while its transmitter is located on Fairfax Avenue in Arnold.

KLJT was originally founded in 1987 as KDHX by Double Helix Corporation; it operated as a volunteer-based community radio station which aired specialty music, and cultural and public affairs programming. KDHX's operations began to decline in the 2020s, following accusations of mismanagement by current and former volunteers of the station, and a resulting decline in financial support. Amid these issues, the station laid off all its volunteer staff in January 2025 and filed for bankruptcy in March. The station broadcast only automated music programming thereafter, pending the station's future sale.

After a bidding war with the Educational Media Foundation, Gateway Creative Broadcasting won the right to acquire the station in an auction conducted by the bankruptcy court. Gateway subsequently took over operations of the station in October 2025, with KDHX returning to air under the new call letters KLJT. After airing a transitional simulcast of a rhythmic adult contemporary format from sister station KXBS-HD2, the station flipped to contemporary worship music in January 2026.

== History ==
=== As KDHX ===
The station signed on the air on October 14, 1987. At the time of KDHX's founding, the frequency 88.1 MHz was occupied by 10-watt, Class D station KHRU-FM, operated by Clayton High School in Clayton, Missouri. It began broadcasting in 1968. KHRU-FM was on the air from 5:00-8:00 p.m. only on weeknights during the school year. The frequency was silent the rest of the week and during the summer.

A public corporation, the Double Helix Foundation, was looking for a spot on the St. Louis FM dial to start a community radio station in a format like former St. Louis station KDNA, which operated from 1969-1973. Double Helix's name, and KDHX's call letters, were inspired by the call letters of KDNA. Double Helix tried to work out a cooperative arrangement with the Clayton School District to share 88.1 FM, but the school district was unwilling to accept a frequency-sharing proposal. Eventually, Double Helix sued in federal court, resulting in a decision that broadcast stations had to "use it or lose it" with regard to frequencies. Stations licensed by the Federal Communications Commission are required to broadcast a minimum number of hours each week. After that decision, the FCC revoked KHRU's license and awarded the frequency to the Double Helix Corporation.

From that point, KDHX began broadcasting most hours of the day with non-commercial programs. A variety of musical genres and talk shows aired. Most of the staff were volunteers.

In 2013, KDHX relocated from its original studios on Magnolia Avenue to a renovated building in the Grand Center Arts District, which would house a coffee shop and 125-seat concert venue on its ground floor. It was christened the Larry J. Weir Center for Independent Media in honor of the station's former operations manager, who had died in 2010.

==== Decline ====
In 2014, the station fell behind on its payroll taxes due to expenses amassed from the construction of its new studios. In 2015, executive director Beverly Hacker was dismissed, and half of KDHX's board resigned. At this time, Hacker was succeeded by station employee Kelly Wells. By 2018, the station had amassed at least $2.3 million in debt. In July 2019, Wells faced allegations of sexual harassment, and of the mistreatment of African-American employees. Station veterans had also criticized her "top-down" management, a lack of input in its operations, and a large amount of staff turnover.

In February 2023, KDHX released several volunteer DJs, including long-time host Tom "Papa" Ray; he told the Riverfront Times that he had come into conflicts with management, stemming initially from the station not acknowledging the recent death of veteran KDHX personality John McHenry (who had hosted an R&B show for nearly 30 years before his death at 75), and not participating in the Music at the Intersection festival (which took place near where KDHX's new studio was situated). Ray described the current management as being "180 degrees opposite of the intentions, desires and profile that the founders of this radio station wanted".

In September 2023, 10 more DJs were controversially dismissed by the station, while two more stepped down in solidarity. Although Wells publicly stated that most of the dismissals were of DJs who had objected to moves by KDHX to adopt diversity, equity, and inclusion (DEI) policies in response to the prior harassment allegations, some of the dismissed DJs accused the station of having actually removed them for raising concerns regarding its management. This decision resulted in protests by other volunteers, associate members, and listeners, with many longtime donors withdrawing their financial support to KDHX. The station had added 26 new program hosts in 2023, with a focus on increasing the representation of "historically underrepresented backgrounds" in its programming.

In February 2024, over 450 local and national musicians signed a letter demanding the resignation of station leadership, citing that KDHX had "divorc[ed] itself from the St. Louis community" with its "poor management decisions". At that time, KDHX had lost nearly a third of its donors. The 990 tax filing for the 2023 tax year stated that donations were $808,378, which was down from the $1,314,351 brought in before the allegations against Wells began. Following the legal agreement that seated two new board members, both were suspended during their first board meeting. After this, and an analysis of financial records, a lawsuit was filed against the remaining members of the board for "gross abuses of authority".

==== Bankruptcy and sale ====
Amidst the ongoing issues with the current board, in December 2024 Double Helix reached an agreement to sell KDHX to Gateway Creative Broadcasting—owner of contemporary Christian music station KLJY—for $5.2 million. On January 31, 2025, Double Helix Corporation laid off all volunteer staff and ceased live programming on KDHX, carrying only automated programming thereafter. Board president Gary Pierson attributed the cuts to "recent disparagement campaigns and senseless lawsuits" that have "severely impacted fundraising".

Double Helix filed for Chapter 11 bankruptcy protection on March 10, 2025, revealing that KDHX only had about $7,000 in cash remaining. Due to expired insurance, employees could not enter KDHX's studios. Double Helix requested the naming of K-Love Inc.—a subsidiary of the Educational Media Foundation (EMF)—as a debtor in possession creditor, and negotiated a $400,000 loan.

On March 25, 2025, despite the previous Gateway deal, the board of directors approved an agreement to sell KDHX's broadcast facilities to EMF for $4.35 million, which would result in the station most likely joining its K-Love Christian radio network. KDHX planned to continue operations as an internet radio station afterward. St. Louis is one of the few markets where the EMF does not currently have a station, with Radio Insight noting that the organization no longer avoided entering markets that already had established Christian music stations (in this case, KLJY). Double Helix stated that the sale would also result in a cost savings of $500,000 in maintenance expenses. Double Helix declined an offer by the League of Volunteer Enthusiasts of KDHX (LOVE of KDHX)—a group of former KDHX staff members and volunteers—to contribute $100,000 in funding to the station.

On April 5, 2025, the station briefly carried K-Love programming. On April 15, 2025, it was reported that Gateway had made a $5.5 million counter-offer, and requested that the bankruptcy court launch a bidding process for the station. On May 15, 2025, the bankruptcy court authorized an auction of the station and its assets, scheduled for May 30. Gateway won the auction with a bid of $8.75 million. LOVE of KDHX announced its intent to file an opposition to the sale. The sale was approved by the bankruptcy court on June 10; it was disclosed that the sale agreement included an option for Gateway to give Double Helix access to an HD Radio subchannel on one of its stations.

The LOVE of KDHX proposal was rejected, but the group rebranded as LOVE of Community Radio STL and announced plans to launch its own internet radio station by the end of 2025.

=== As KLJT ===
On October 1, 2025, after the station fell silent in September, Double Helix Corporation announced that KDHX had officially ceased operations. The company stated that it would continue to operate its studios, and that it was preparing to "solicit advice and feedback for the next set of programs that we seek to bring to life in late 2026 or 2027". The next day, Gateway assumed operations of the KDHX signal under the new call letters KLJT, and flipped it to a simulcast of KXBS-HD2's Jams rhythmic adult contemporary format.

On October 28, 2025, Gateway announced that the station would flip to contemporary worship music in January 2026 as 88.1 Worship One. The new format launched on January 15, 2026.
