= National Building Arts Center =

Collection of architectural artifacts

Coordinates: 38.594927°N 90.168276°W

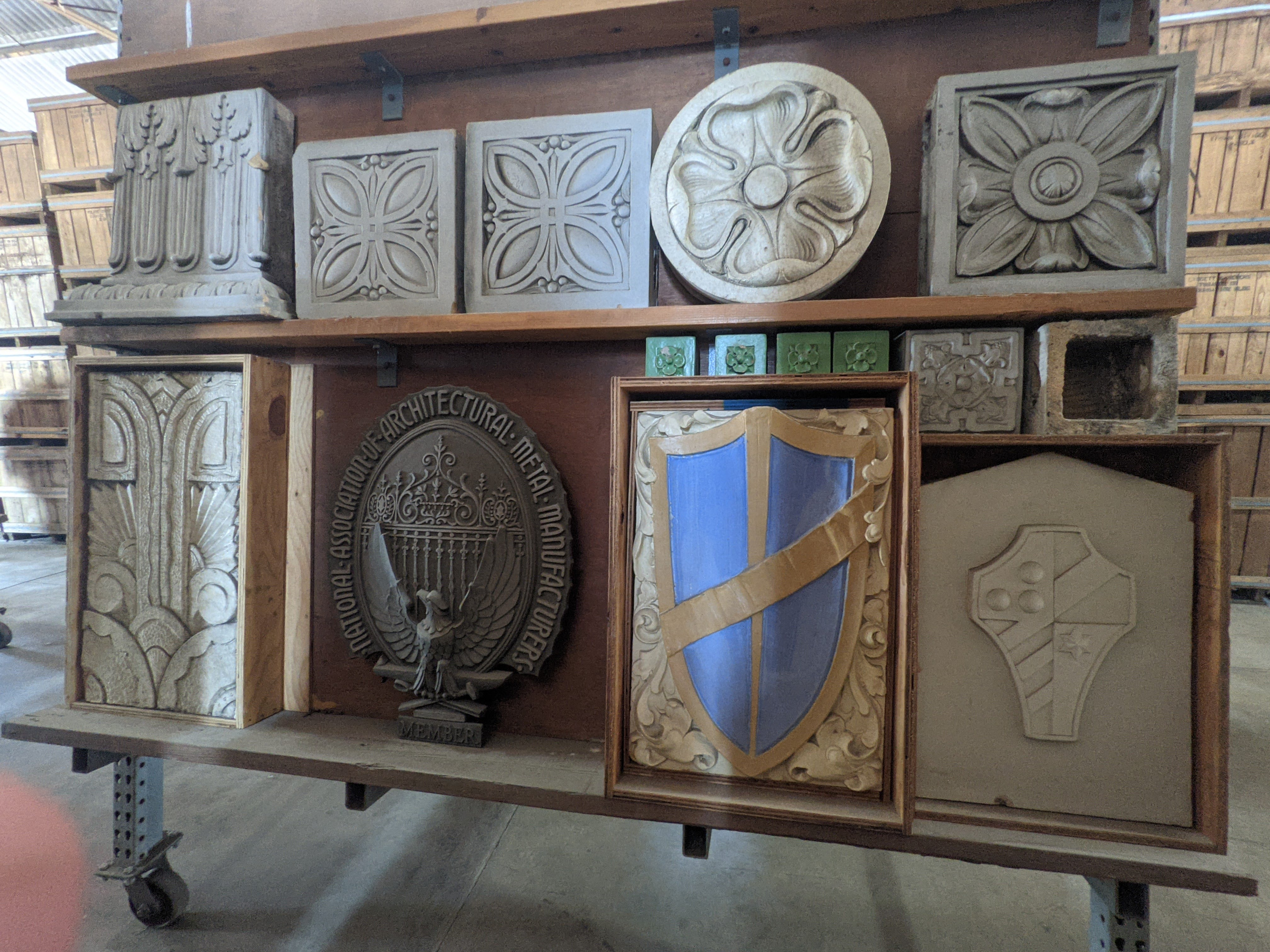
- Formation: 2002; 24 years ago
- Founder: Larry Giles
- Founded at: St. Louis, Missouri, United States
- Type: Non-profit foundation
- Registration no.: 05-0545749
- Headquarters: Sauget, Illinois, United States
- Region served: Midwest
- Executive Director: Michael R. Allen
- President: Mike Jackson
- Secretary: Mimi Stiritz
- Treasurer: Jason Deem
- Staff: Emery Cox
- Website: www.nationalbuildingarts.org

The National Building Arts Center (NBAC) is a large collection of architectural, structural, and industrial items on a 12.5-acre (5.1 ha) site in Sauget, Illinois. The collection, thought to be the largest amount of architectural artifacts in the United States, is the physical collection of the St. Louis Building Arts Foundation.

The Center salvages and stores important architectural and industrial elements to promote public awareness of architecture, manufacturing, construction, and urban design in the built environment. It also works to ensure historic preservation of existing buildings and maintains an extensive research library.

The foundation and center began as the personal collecting hobby and the architectural salvaging business of Larry Giles, a pioneering historic preservationist in St. Louis, Missouri. Giles also compiled a large collection of specialty books, manuscripts, periodicals, blueprints, drafts, and other documents.

The Center started by saving architecturally significant pieces of historic buildings in the St. Louis region that were to be demolished. It now takes pieces from around the country and occasionally internationally. It also collects artifacts before major renovations of historic structures.

The center also holds the contents of other museums and collections. NBAC acquired most of the architectural collection of the Brooklyn Museum, which had obtained the "Little Liberty" statue at the insistence of New Yorkers in 2003 when the Liberty Storage & Warehouse Company on the Upper West Side of Manhattan was converted to condominiums. It was placed in the museum's sculpture garden and was sent to NBAC for repairs and a new home in 2023.

The Center stores a large quantity of materials from New York City, Chicago, and Philadelphia. It lends out its materials to other museums and exhibitions, such as the Pulitzer Arts Foundation, the Missouri History Museum, and the World Chess Hall of Fame.

Columns, beams, façades, stones, bricks, statues and monuments, signs, displays, and other architectural elements were initially stored in warehouse spaces around St. Louis. In 2007, the collection was consolidated and moved to Sauget, Illinois, after the former Sterling Steel Casting foundry property was acquired for about $1 million. The collection's 300,000-plus items were moved in 1,600 wooden crates of 30 cubic feet (0.85 cubic metres) in about 350 semi-truck loads. The facility is located within sight of the Arch and with a partial view of downtown St. Louis.

The Center provides tours upon scheduled request. It plans to show their collection to the general public similar to a museum format. In the original plans for the Gateway Arch, there was an idea to include an architecture museum on the Illinois side of the Mississippi River. To raise money for the site and operations, the Center sells duplicates and doubles of artifacts, in addition to traditional fundraising, as well as some items (often duplicates, and including books, specialty periodicals, schematics, and rare maps, among others) from the library.

Items in the collection include:

- 8 foot (2.4 metres)-tall terracotta frieze from the 18-story Ambassador Theater Building
- Missouri Pacific Building
- St. Louis Terra Cotta company
- Soulard Station Post Office
- Gaslight Square
- State Bank of Wellston sign and support mast (saved after Giles raised $19,000 to rent necessary equipment including a crane and flatbed trucks to salvage the rotating illuminated sign)
- Elements from the remodeled Globe Building
- Cherokee Native Statue, which was removed from the Cherokee Street district to respect the original inhabitants of the land
- Most of the architectural collection of the Brooklyn Museum, including "Little Liberty", a 27 ft (8.2 m) pressed metal replica of the Statue of Liberty

== See also ==
- National Building Museum (Washington, DC)
- Museum of Architecture
