= KNBS =

Simulcast with K270BW, St. Louis
- Bowling Green, Missouri; United States
- Broadcast area: St. Louis, Missouri
- Frequency: 94.1 MHz
- Branding: NewsTalkSTL

Programming
- Format: Conservative talk

Ownership
- Owner: Epic STL LLC d/b/a News Talk STL Radio

History
- First air date: August 1, 1975
- Former call signs: KPCR-FM (1975–2004); KPVR (2004–2021)
- Former frequencies: 100.9 MHz (1975–1991)

Technical information
- Licensing authority: FCC
- Facility ID: 52572
- Class: C3
- ERP: 7,500 watts
- HAAT: 180.4 meters (592 ft)
- Transmitter coordinates: 39°15′45″N 91°4′9″W

Links
- Public license information: Public file; LMS
- Webcast: Listen Live
- Website: newstalkstl.com

KNBS is a radio station in Bowling Green, Missouri and serves the western (Westplex) suburbs of St. Louis. KNBS simulcasts K270BW (101.9 FM) and KLJY-HD3 (99.1 FM), airing a conservative talk format known as "NewsTalkSTL". The station is owned by Epic STL, a local ownership consortium, with programming originating from its studios near Westport Plaza in Maryland Heights, Missouri.

== History ==
KNBS was established as KPCR-FM at 100.9 MHz on August 1, 1975. It was the companion to KPCR (1530 AM) in the same town and simulcast that station and its country music format two-thirds of the time.

Original owner Pike County Broadcasting, Inc., sold the KPCR stations in 1998 to Indacom, Inc., for $490,000. Indacom sold the two country outlets to Four Him, Inc., headed by Michael Fallon, in 2001 in a $725,000 transaction. KPVR and the 97.7 station at Potosi formed Joy FM, the new contemporary Christian station for St. Louis, formed after a previous commercial outlet in the city was sold and changed formats in 1998.

Joy FM acquired the former KFUO-FM 99.1 in St. Louis and relaunched it as KLJY in July 2010; the original simulcast continued to air Joy FM for several more years. Boost was launched on its present signals—the former Joy FM simulcast and a St. Louis translator owned by the Educational Media Foundation—on March 24, 2014.

On November 6, 2020, Gateway announced it would acquire the facility of WFUN-FM 95.5 from Urban One, and that Boost Radio would move from KPVR, KHZR, and K270BW to said station after Gateway assumed operations on January 4, 2021. The call letters of KPVR and KHZR were changed to KNBS and KQBS, remaining with Boost Radio at that time.

On August 9, 2021, KNBS flipped to a simulcast of the conservative talk "NewsTalkSTL" programming heard on K270BW/KLJY-HD3. Operator Epic STL agreed to purchase the station outright for $200,000 in June 2023, a deal completed on October 31.
