= KDNA (St. Louis) =

FM radio station in Missouri, 1969 to 1972

Coordinates: 38.6456°N 90.2487°W

KDNA (102.5 FM) was a St. Louis, Missouri freeform non-commercial community radio station from February 8, 1969, until June 22, 1973. It billed itself as "Radio Free St. Louis". The KDNA call letters are currently used by a different station, a Spanish language station at 91.9 FM in Yakima, Washington, and the 102.5 FM frequency in St. Louis is currently occupied by a commercial station with the call letters KEZK-FM which broadcasts in the "Adult Contemporary Format".

== History ==
KDNA in St. Louis was founded by Jeremy Lansman and Lorenzo Milam. Lansman met Milam in Seattle, Washington, while the two were working at an alternative radio station there called KRAB. Milam provided the initial funding ($50,000) for KDNA, and after competition for the frequency from the First Christian Fundamentalist Church, eventually the Federal Communications Commission granted Lansman and Milam a license. The radio station broadcast from 4285 Olive in Gaslight Square in the center of St. Louis, an area, according to Leonard Slatkin, where "the majority of nightlife used to be concentrated, but [by] the late ’60s had [been] reduced ... to a set of run-down and decrepit buildings". Slatkin was assistant conductor of the St. Louis Symphony Orchestra at the time, and after an on-air interview at the station, he agreed to host his own weekly show called the Slatkin Project, which aired from 2:00 PM to 6:00 PM Thursdays.

Slatkin characterizes the station as having been "run by a group of slightly aging hippies, most of whom lived on the premises. Whoever got up first in the morning would turn on the transmitter. There was no NPR at the time and stations like these were usually referred to as alternative, or underground, radio with little or no format." He goes on to write, "KDNA was busted a couple of times for drugs and violating all sorts of building and FCC codes. But I loved every minute of my three years there." (Lansman and two staff members were once charged with violating state drug laws; but Lansman maintained the drugs were planted, and the charges were eventually dropped.)

Among the many diverse shows that aired on KDNA was a ragtime piano program that began March 7, 1972, and continued for some time every Tuesday from 8:00 PM until 9:00 PM hosted by Trebor Tichenor, then pianist with the St. Louis Ragtimers who played regularly on the Showboat Goldenrod.

The historical preservationist and architectural salvager Larry Giles volunteered for a time at the station, broadcasting lectures and interviews with artistic and political guests.

A 1973 video documentary "Fat Chance, or Community Radio in St. Louis," shows life inside KDNA, including live music by many musicians on one of the station's periodic Live Days. It also includes interviews with Jeremy Lansman and staff members Laura Hopper and Tom Thomas. Video on YouTube.

On July 3, 1983, the St. Louis Post-Dispatch published an article, “Kooky KDNA: Long Gone, but Legacy Lingers” by Harper Barnes. The article describes KDNA programming and follows up with several people who were key figures at the station.

After a pledge drive failed to yield enough money to allow the station to continue, Lansman and Milam sold the station to Cecil Heftel for $1.4 million in June 1973. One of KDNA's staff members, Mike O'Connor, went on to co-found in 1975 WORT, a non-NPR community radio station in Madison, Wisconsin, that continues to this day.

KOPN, a community radio station in Columbia, Missouri, acquired the transmitter. KOPN is still on the air.

KDNA selected FM radio when it was still newer technology and was not desired commercially, and it was therefore relatively cheap to obtain the widely open band space. As commercial radio developed, the frequency became near the middle of the commercial dial and thus very lucrative. WBAI in New York City is one of the few remaining community radio stations in the commercial spectrum in the US, although community radio were early adopters of FM. Most community stations are now located in the lower end of the band ("left of the dial") in the reserved band for non-commercial stations. A successor of sorts to KDNA in St. Louis was KDHX, which operated from 1987-2025 before ceasing operations after a period of mismanagement and the successor operator of the frequency changing the call letters to KLJT. Mirroring a nationwide trend of dominance in the non-commercial band, it broadcasts Christian music.

== Jeremy Lansman ==
Jeremy Lansman, who hailed from the St. Louis area and attended Clayton High School in Clayton, a suburb of St. Louis, had formally studied radio.

Lansman was KYES-TV president and chief engineer manager, and president of Fireweed Communications and KNIK-LD. Lansman died in Grabouw, South Africa on December 28, 2024.

== Further reading and listening ==
- Co-founder Lorenzo Milam includes two essays about KDNA in his book The Radio Papers. One makes up the chapter called "KDNA", and the other is included in the chapter called "KCHU".
- In A Trumpet to Arms: Alternative Media in America, author David Armstrong mentions KDNA within a discussion of a larger movement of non-commercial, non-institutionally affiliated radio stations and its relation to early commercial FM rock stations considered "underground", such as KSHE in St. Louis.
- Jesse Walker's Rebels on the Air: An Alternative History of Radio in America (NYU Press, 2001) includes a section on KDNA in the chapter "Into the '70s". The book recounts the history of community radio, including events leading up to KDNA's founding and the beginnings of the station's successor in St. Louis, KDHX.
- The State Historical Society of Missouri houses tapes from the KDNA archives, syndicated material supplied to KDNA, and recordings from St. Louis's current community station KDHX.
