= KXBS =

Radio station in St. Louis

Coordinates: 38.6523°N 90.2843°W

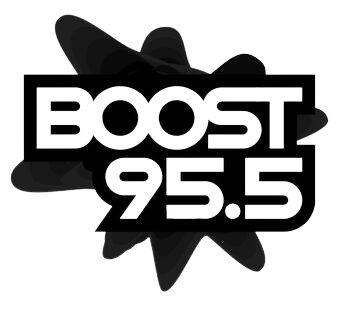
- Bethalto, Illinois; United States
- Broadcast area: Greater St. Louis
- Frequency: 95.5 MHz (HD Radio)
- Branding: Boost 95.5

Programming
- Format: Christian rhythmic contemporary
- Subchannels: HD2: Rhythmic adult contemporary "Jams"; HD3: Urban oldies "Foxy 106.9"

Ownership
- Owner: Gateway Creative Broadcasting, Inc.
- Sister stations: KNBS, KLJY

History
- First air date: 1987; 39 years ago (as WXJO)
- Former call signs: WXJO (1987–1992); WFUN-FM (1992–2020)
- Call sign meaning: Boost

Technical information
- Licensing authority: FCC
- Facility ID: 4948
- Class: C3
- ERP: 10,500 watts
- HAAT: 155 meters (509 ft)
- Translator: HD3: 106.9 K295CQ (St. Louis)
- Repeater: 97.7 KQBS (Potosi, Missouri)

Links
- Public license information: Public file; LMS
- Webcast: Listen via iHeart; Listen Live (HD3)
- Website: boostradio.com foxy1069.com (HD3)

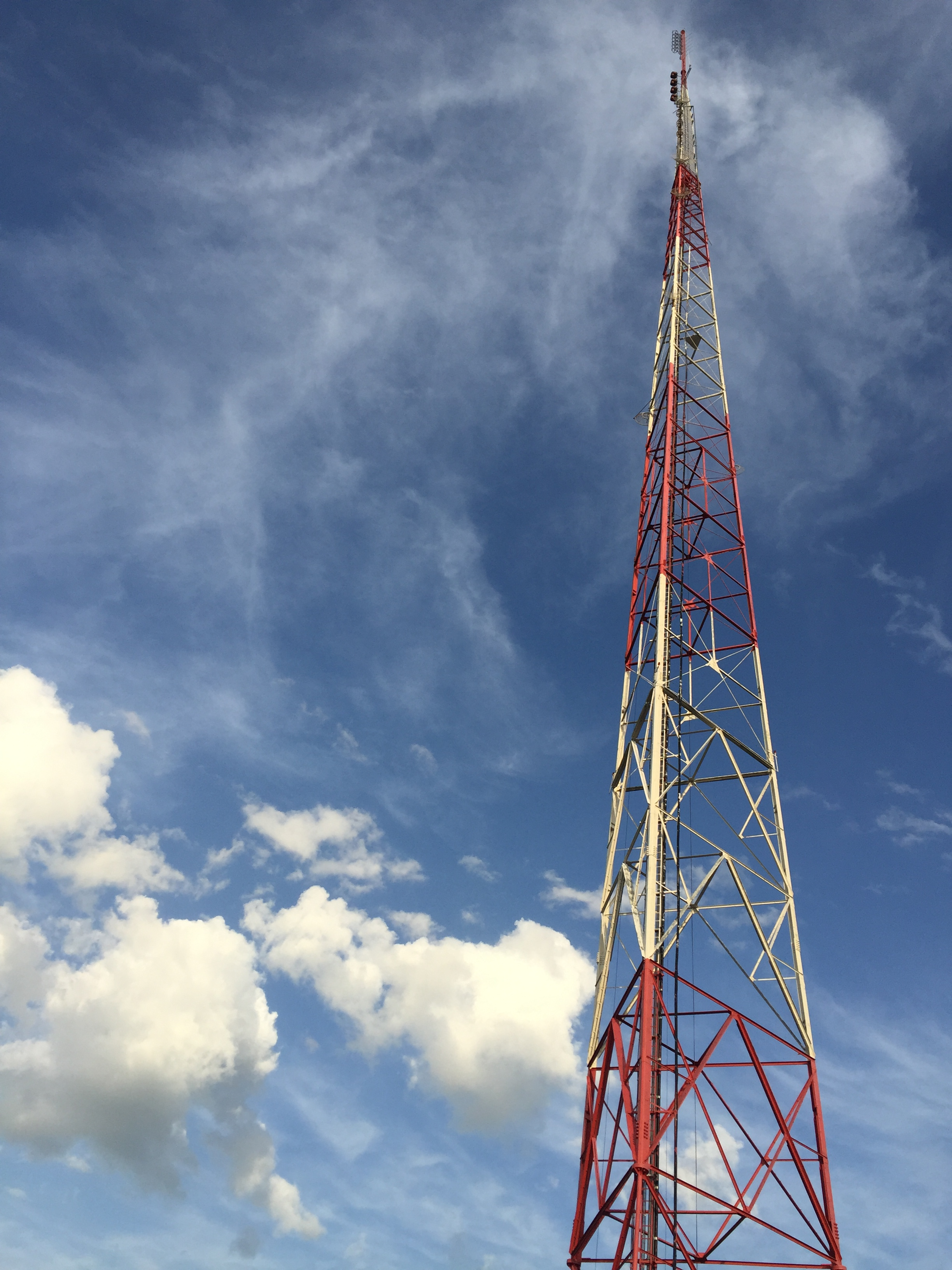
KXBS transmitter location

KXBS (95.5 FM) is a non-commercial, listener-supported radio station licensed to Bethalto, Illinois, and serving Greater St. Louis. KXBS and sister station KQBS 97.7 in Potosi, Missouri are owned by Gateway Creative Broadcasting, and they simulcast a Christian rhythmic contemporary radio format known as "Boost 95.5". The radio studios for KXBS, KQBS and Christian Contemporary KLJY are on Manchester Road (Missouri Route 100) in Des Peres.

KXBS has an effective radiated power (ERP) of 10,500 watts. The transmitter is on DeBaliviere Avenue in St. Louis, just north of Forest Park. KQBS has an ERP of 26,500 watts, with a transmitter located off Missouri Route 21, near Flamewood Road, in Potosi. KXBS broadcasts using HD Radio technology; it airs rhythmic adult contemporary music on its HD2 subchannel and urban oldies on its HD3 subchannel.

== History ==
=== WXJO ===
The station signed on in 1987, as WXJO, airing an adult standards format, and broadcast with 6,000 watts, a quarter of its current power. On April 1, 1991, Bob Cox negotiated a package to take over operation of the station, changing the format to children's radio. It was called The Imagination Station, Radio Just For Kids. Inadequate advertisement revenues, combined with a pending lawsuit from the original trademark holder of the name The Imagination Station, forced Cox into a position where he could not maintain the lease on the transmitter.

On September 8, 1992, at 3 p.m., the station moniker was changed to "Fun Radio". Thinking the transmitter could be sold, the lease was terminated later that year. The station went dark for a couple of months, during which time the potential sale fell through. The owner, looking for revenues that would allow him to keep the transmitter out of foreclosure, worked with a former employee of the Imagination Station.

=== WFUN-FM ===
On November 1, the station was brought back on the air under the new call sign WFUN-FM. The station was once owned by a non-profit organization which would later refund the contributors after a decision was made to make the station a commercial outlet. It signed up with Radio AAHS, a children's radio network (and the predecessor to Radio Disney). After a several year run, using the station moniker "Planet Fun", the station's owner decided to sell WFUN-FM to Radio One in 1999. The station went dark again for several months.

On June 2, 2000, WFUN-FM completed an upgrade to 24,500 watts, and officially flipped to urban contemporary as Q95-5. At first, "Q" was a close competitor, but over time, would fall behind similar urban stations in St. Louis. It also had other problems in attracting African-American listeners, mostly due to its limited signal.

=== Urban AC ===
On December 13, 2004, Radio One flipped WFUN-FM to urban adult contemporary, branded as "Foxy 95.5". The move was made after Radio One purchased the syndication rights to the Tom Joyner Morning Show. The format switch was made to match the demographics that enjoyed Joyner's program. Joyner previously aired on rival KMJM-FM in the St. Louis market. Eventually, WFUN added the Love, Lust and Lies with Michael Baisden afternoon show as well.

On October 1, 2005, Radio One added a sister station, WHHL (Hot 104.1), which started out as rhythmic contemporary, but is now urban.

=== Urban oldies ===
On November 7, 2012, at 7 p.m., WFUN-FM flipped to urban oldies, branded as "Old School 95.5". The final song on "Foxy" was "It's So Hard to Say Goodbye to Yesterday" by Boyz II Men, while the first song on "Old School" was "Fantastic Voyage" by Lakeside. The switch mirrored similar flips in Dallas, Charlotte, Philadelphia, and Cincinnati.

Shortly after longtime rival KMJM-FM flipped to classic hip-hop in November 2014, WFUN dropped the "Old School" moniker and simply started calling itself "95.5". In addition, the station added more current music, and adopted the slogan "Old School & Today's R&B." By early 2015, the "Old School" branding had returned.

On November 17, 2016, WFUN rebranded again as "95.5: R&B and Old School for the Lou", and shifted back to Urban AC.

=== Boost 95.5 ===
On November 5, 2020, Urban One announced that it would trade WHHL and the intellectual property of WFUN-FM, as well as two other stations in Philadelphia and Washington, D.C., to Entercom. In exchange, Urban One would receive WBT/WBT-FM, WFNZ and WLNK in Charlotte, North Carolina. The following day, Urban One announced it would divest WFUN-FM to Gateway Creative Broadcasting, owner of contemporary Christian-formatted KLJY. The group would take over WFUN-FM under a local marketing agreement (LMA) on January 4, 2021, and flip the station to Christian rhythmic CHR as Boost Radio (in simulcast with KQBS).

The urban AC format and the "Lou" branding were moved to Entercom's KNOU as 96.3 The Lou at midnight on November 23. The next day, WFUN-FM changed call letters to KXBS to match the "Boost Radio" branding. The WFUN-FM call sign concurrently moved to KNOU.

From November 23, 2020 through December 15, 2020, KXBS ran a four-minute loop produced by Urban One, directing listeners to 96.3 to hear WFUN-FM. On December 16, 2020, Gateway Creative Broadcasting's LMA began, and KXBS began stunting with a rhythmic adult contemporary micro-format as "95.5 Jams". That lasted until 9:55 a.m. on January 4, 2021, when "Boost" officially moved to 95.5. The sale to Gateway was officially approved by the FCC on March 5, 2021, and was consummated on April 20.

=== HD Radio subchannels ===
As of January 1, 2022, KXBS-HD2 broadcasts a rhythmic adult contemporary format branded as Jams: The Rhythm of St. Louis. As of October 2, 2025, the Jams format is also simulcast on KLJT (88.1 FM), while the sale of the station from Double Helix Corporation to Gateway closes.

KXBS-HD3 airs an Urban oldies format, known as "Foxy 106.9". The subchannel feeds FM translator K295CQ (106.9 MHz) in St. Louis.
