= KLJY =

Contemporary Christian music radio station in Clayton, Missouri

- Clayton, Missouri; United States
- Broadcast area: Greater St. Louis
- Frequency: 99.1 MHz (HD Radio)
- Branding: Joy FM

Programming
- Format: Contemporary Christian
- Subchannels: HD2: Christian CHR; HD3: Conservative talk

Ownership
- Owner: Gateway Creative Broadcasting, Inc.
- Sister stations: KNBS, KQBS, KXBS

History
- First air date: January 1, 1948
- Former call signs: KFUO-FM (1948–2010)
- Call sign meaning: "Keep Living Joy"

Technical information
- Licensing authority: FCC
- Facility ID: 65924
- Class: C0
- ERP: 100,000 watts
- HAAT: 309 meters (1,014 ft)
- Transmitter coordinates: 38°34′24″N 90°19′30″W
- Translator: HD3: 101.9 K270BW (Bellefontaine)
- Repeater: HD2: 95.5 KXBS (Bethalto)

Links
- Public license information: Public file; LMS
- Webcast: Listen Live
- Website: IChooseJoy.com

KLJY (99.1 FM) is a noncommercial radio station licensed to Clayton, Missouri, United States, and serving the Greater St. Louis region. Owned by Gateway Creative Broadcasting, it broadcasts a Christian contemporary format known as "99.1 Joy FM". The studios are located on Founders Lane in Des Peres, with a St. Louis address.

KLJY's transmitter is sited in Resurrection Cemetery in Shrewsbury. KLJY broadcasts in HD Radio: the HD-2 digital subchannel simulcasts co-owned KXBS, while the HD-3 subchannel carries a conservative talk format branded "NewsTalkSTL", which is relayed over low-power FM translator K270BW at 101.9 MHz in nearby Bellefontaine.

== History ==
=== Early history ===
On January 1, 1948, the station signed on the air as KFUO-FM. It was the FM counterpart to KFUO (850 AM), which signed on in 1924. Both stations were owned by the Lutheran Church – Missouri Synod (LCMS), simulcasting Christian radio programming. KFUO-FM was originally on 104.1 MHz before later moving to 99.1 MHz.

Over time, the simulcast programming was reduced. The AM station continues, to this day, broadcasting Christian programming. In 1975, to satisfy Federal Communications Commission regulations that discouraged AM and FM stations from simulcasting their programming, the FM switched to all classical music. It only carried some religious shows and sacred music on Sundays.

=== Classical music ===
For 62 years, KFUO-FM was the St. Louis market's primary classical music radio station. It was branded as "Classic 99 KFUO-FM". KFUO-FM transmitted with an effective radiated power of 100 kW. KFUO-FM's studios were located on the campus of Concordia Seminary, one of two graduate theological seminaries operated by the LCMS. KFUO-FM's transmitter was located in Affton, Missouri.

KFUO-FM began as a listener supported station, but later moved to a commercial format. KFUO-FM was voted best classical music station in America in 2005.

Due to the expense of running both stations, the LCMS decided to sell the FM station in 2010.

=== Joy FM ===
"Joy FM" was founded by Sandi Brown, a former disc jockey on WCBW, a commercial Christian Contemporary station. (That station was sold in 1997 and its format switched to urban adult contemporary.) A new organization, Gateway Creative Broadcasting, was formed to look for a place on the FM dial for Christian Contemporary music. The creators decided from the beginning the new station would be a non-commercial, listener supported station so it would not be subject to ratings and format changes. At the beginning, Joy FM had two rimshot stations operating at 94.1 (KPVR) and 97.7 (KHZR).

In March 2010, Gateway Creative Broadcasting bought KFUO-FM, with the sale approved by the FCC in May. The sale upset local classical music fans, due to the loss of the only remaining St. Louis radio station devoted completely to Classical music. A petition was filed with the FCC, alleging that the pending transfer was not open to public bidding, though it was unsuccessful. At 10 p.m. on July 6, 2010, KFUO-FM signed off its 62 year-old classical music format with Beethoven's Symphony No. 9. (Classical music returned to St. Louis later as an HD Radio digital subchannel on KWMU-HD3, as well as translator K297BI/WFUN-HD2.)

The new owners began broadcasting "Joy FM" at 7 a.m. on July 7 under new KLJY call letters.

=== CLASSIC99.com ===
At the time of KFUO-FM's shutoff on July 6, 2010, the classical and sacred web stream continued at CLASSIC99.com. Ron Klemm, Dick Wobbe, and John Clayton, all formerly of KFUO-FM, continued the music programming, which has grown since 2010. CLASSIC99.com remains active and continues to stream classical and sacred music. It continues to look for new digital delivery channels for its local and worldwide audience.

Since April 2013, CLASSIC99.com has shared its music library of some 30,000 CDs with a new classical broadcast station in St. Louis branded as "RAF STL" and founded in part by former KFUO-FM program director Jim Connett. The new station features Tom Sudholt of KFUO-FM each afternoon and early evening. WRR-FM in Dallas, Texas has also shared its music library with the new station, which broadcasts a low power analog signal on 107.3 MHz and a 48 kbit/second digital stream on 96.3-2, an HD channel of FM station WFUN-FM.
