= Ron Kurtenbach =

Republican politician (born 1943)

Ron Kurtenbach (born January 6, 1943) is a community activist, he is one of the original groups which founded the local Lincoln radio station KZUM and the local grocery co-op Open Harvest. He is also one of the groups which founded the short-lived Lincoln Communist music venue, The Red and Black Café, in the early 1990s, a spin-off to another talk program he produced with ex-wife Sally Herrin, noted Lincoln author and teacher, and a number of others called "Zero Street" (from the Allen Ginsberg poem "Wichita Vortex Sutra" in which Ginsburg called Lincoln's main drag, O Street, "Zero Street"). Many Lincoln bands, including Plastik Trumpet and Hour Slave played at the Red and Black.

He was a long-time custodian at the University of Nebraska–Lincoln. He received his Ph.D. in English in May 2000, and taught briefly at both the University of Nebraska–Lincolnand at Kearney.

Kurtenbach is most well known for his long-running controversial Public-access television call-in comedy show, Ron's World, that was seen nightly on local Lincoln cable TV. On the program, he explained the basics of Marxist thinking, read poetry and spent most of the time discussing his politics with the general public.

Prior to cable television, Kurtenbach was the editor/publisher of the Lincoln Gazette. His "free or donation" weekly paper featured everything from political perspectives to poetry to the cartoons of the talented, local cartoonist Scott Stewart (most notable among Stewart's creations was "Telegram Sam," the bomb-toting anarchist). By the late '70s, the Lincoln Gazette was available in Lincoln, Omaha and communities across Nebraska. A group dissatisfied with Kurtenbach left the Gazette to form the short-lived Nebraska Dispatch.

Kurtenbach's stature as a local cult figure grew to the point that he once was invited to be the host of a public school "celebrity" basketball charity event.

Kurtenbach is married to wife Maria, and moved to China to teach English. Ron now lives in Portugal. Kurtenbach is the Father of two sons, and has three grandchildren.
