= Museum of Architecture =

Museum of Architecture or Architecture Museum may refer to:

- Archizoom (EPFL), Lausanne, Switzerland
- Canadian Centre for Architecture, Montreal, Canada
- German Architecture Museum, Frankfurt, Germany
- Latvian Museum of Architecture, Riga, Latvia
- Museo de la Arquitectura Ponceña, Ponce, Puerto Rico
- Museo Nacional de Arquitectura, Mexico City, Mexico
- Museum for Architectural Drawing, Berlin, Germany
- Museum of Architecture, Wrocław, Poland
- Museum of Finnish Architecture, Helsinki, Finland
- Museum of Estonian Architecture, Tallinn, Estonia
- Museum of Puerto Rican Architecture, Ponce, Puerto Rico, USA
- Netherlands Architecture Institute, Rotterdam, Netherlands
- Shchusev State Museum of Architecture, Moscow, Russia
- Swedish Centre for Architecture and Design, Stockholm, Sweden
- Swiss Architecture Museum, Basel, Switzerland
- Ultra Architecture Museum, Seoul, South Korea
- Victoria and Albert Museum, London, England

== See also ==
- Architecture and Design Museum, Los Angeles, USA
- Architekturzentrum Wien, Vienna, Austria
- Bauhaus Archive, Berlin, Germany
- Bauhaus Museum, Weimar, Weimar, Germany
- Beijing Planning Exhibition Hall, Beijing, China
- Edo-Tokyo Open Air Architectural Museum, Tokyo, Japan
- Museum of Domestic Design and Architecture, London, England
- Museum of Folk Architecture and Life, Uzhhorod, Ukraine
- National Building Museum, Washington, D.C., United States
- National Museum of Art, Architecture and Design, Oslo, Norway
- New Bauhaus Museum Weimar, Weimar, Germany
- Open-air Museum of the Łódź Wooden Architecture, Łódź, Poland
- Shanghai Urban Planning Exhibition Center, Shanghai, China
- National Building Arts Center, St. Louis, Missouri, United States
