= Bellefontaine, Missouri =

Unincorporated community in Missouri, U.S.

Coordinates: 38.025884°N 90.7001298°W

Bellefontaine is an unincorporated community in Washington County, in the U.S. state of Missouri.

== History ==
A variant name was "Bellefountaine". Bellefontaine took its name from nearby Bellefontaine Lead Mine. The community once had Bellefontaine Schoolhouse, now defunct.
