= Quartette Trés Bien =

Jazz combo band based in St. Louis

The Quartette Trés Bien (later known as the Trio Trés Bien) was an American jazz combo based in St. Louis led by pianist Jeter Thompson. The group started to play around 1960 and began recording in the mid '60s.

== Members ==
Jeter Thompson played with Jimmy Forrest, Oliver Nelson and Emmett Carter in his early years. The bassist of the group was Richard Simmons; the drummer Albert St. James, who accompanied also Charlie Parker, Tab Smith and Jimmy Forrest. Percussionist Percy James added a Latin flavor to the quartet. He had played with the group for more than ten years, before splitting. Jeter Thompson, who died in 2017, remained active into the 2010s, leading for a few years the Trio Tres Bien with brothers Harold Thompson (bass) and Howard Thompson (drums). In 2014, Trio Trés Bien was inducted into the St. Louis Jazz Hall of Fame at Harris-Stowe State University's Wolfe Jazz Institute.

== Discography ==
- Quartette Trés Bien (1962) Norman Records
- Kilimanjaro (1963) Norman Records / (1964) Decca
- Boss Trés Bien (1964) Decca
- Spring Into Spring (1965) Decca
- Stepping Out! (1965) Decca
- Sky High (1966) Decca
- Bully! (1966) Atlantic
- In Motion (1966) Decca
- Where It's At! (1967) Decca
- Here It Is! (1967) Decca
- Four of a Kind (1968) Decca
- Our Thing (1968) Decca
- Coming Together (2004) as the Trio Trés Bien
