= Lorenzo Milam =

American broadcaster

Lorenzo Wilson Milam, born on August 2, 1933, in Jacksonville, Florida; died on July 19, 2020, in Puerto Escondido, Oaxaca, Mexico, was an American writer and activist who was instrumental in starting many of the first listener-supported community radio stations in the United States, beginning with KRAB in Seattle in 1962.

== Early life ==
In 1952, at age 19, he was diagnosed with polio. His sister died of the disease on December 29, 1952, but Milam's case was milder and he was able to walk with crutches after one year. This and the aftermath are described in his autobiographical book "The Cripple Liberation Front Marching Band Blues."

== Community radio ==
Milam is credited with helping start 14 stations from the early 1960s through late 1970s. He got his start in radio volunteering in 1958–1959 at Lew Hill's KPFA in Berkeley, California. He used a $15,000 inheritance to buy a small FM transmitter in 1959 and spent the next 3 years seeking a broadcasting license "anywhere in the US" from the Federal Communications Commission (FCC), which assigned him a frequency in Seattle, 107.7FM. With the help of volunteer engineer Jeremy Lansman he was able to get his antique Collins Radio transmitter on the air in 1962, creating the station KRAB.

Milam and Lansman later assisted in the creation of community radio stations around the country, starting in 1968 with KBOO (1968-1971) in Portland; KTAO (1968-1974); KDNA (St. Louis) 1969-72; KPOO (1972-) San Francisco;, KCHU, 1975-77 Dallas; KFAT (1975-1983) Gilroy, California; WORT (Madison, Wisconsin); WRFG 89.3 FM (Atlanta, Georgia); KOPN 89.5 FM (Columbia, Missouri); KZUM 89.3 FM (Lincoln, Nebraska).

The KRAB Nebula, was a tape exchange, using quarter-inch audio tape sent to stations, sharing programs.

According to David Armstrong in A Trumpet to Arms: Alternative Media in America, "Milam's passion for community radio--and 1.1 million from the sale of a second station, KDNA-St.Louis, to commercial broadcasters in 1973--led him to become a veritable Johnny Appleseed of community radio."

== Sex and Broadcasting ==
Milam authored the 1971 book Sex and Broadcasting, A Handbook on Starting a Radio Station for the Community.

== The "godless" petition ==
In December 1974, Milam and Jeremy Lansman, both radio broadcast consultants in California, sent a petition, RM-2493 to the Federal Communications Commission asking for a freeze on new licenses for educational television and radio channels, and an investigation into religious broadcasters. Although the agency did not consider the petition (on First Amendment grounds), the FCC received over a million letters, about 3,000 per day for many months, protesting the petition, the largest number of letters that the FCC has ever received on an issue.

== The Fessenden Review ==
Milam published 13 issues of the print publication The Fessenden Review between 1985 and 1989. Content was eclectic to an extreme degree, and as likely to confound readers as to amuse them. Issues were released at successively longer intervals as finances dwindled, and later issues were irregularly numbered. Milam hoped that anyone chancing upon a copy at a newsstand would assume it was the current issue and buy it, and that confused dealers would be less likely to identify culls.

== Ralph (journal) ==
Milam, as Publisher/Editor, produced 294 online issues, 1994-2019, of the online publication RALPH: The Review of Arts, Literature, Philosophy and the Humanities.

== Books and publications ==
(this list is incomplete)

- Milam, Lorenzo W. The Myrkin Papers. Bellevue, Wash: Duck Press, 1969. OCLC 3189090
- Milam, Lorenzo W. Everything You've Ever Wanted to Know About Radio and Television (Which Your Friendly Local Broadcaster Would NEVER Tell You...), The Realist. 1971.Paul Krassner, Editor
- Milam, Lorenzo W. Sex and Broadcasting
  - Milam, Lorenzo W. Sex and Broadcasting. 1971, Saratoga, CA: Dildo Press 36 pages
  - Milam, Lorenzo W. Sex and Broadcasting. 1972 73 pages
  - Milam, Lorenzo W. Sex and Broadcasting: A Handbook on Starting a Radio Station for the Community. Los Gatos, Calif.: Dildo Press, 1975. OCLC 3053376
  - Milam, Lorenzo W. The Original Sex and Broadcasting: A Handbook on Starting a Radio Station for the Community. San Diego, CA: Mho & Mho Works, 1988. ISBN 9780917320019
  - Milam, Lorenzo W. Sex and Broadcasting. 2017
- Milam, Lorenzo W. The Cripple Liberation Front Marching Band Blues. San Diego, CA: Mho & Mho Works, 1984. ISBN 9780917320095
- The Fessenden Review (as Publisher/Editor: 13 issues) Circa 1988-1994
- Lorenzo, Milam (1986). The Radio Papers, from KRAB to KCHU: Essays on the Art and Practice of Radio Transmission (PDF). San Diego, CA: MHO & MHO Works. ISBN 9780917320187. ISBN 9780917320194
- The Lourdes of Arizona (as Carlos A. Amantea), 1989
  - The Lourdes of Psychotherapy : The 1985 Evolution of Pscyhotherapy Conference Revealed, 2005 Limited Edition
- The Blob That Ate Oaxaca and Other Travel Tales (as Carlos Amantea) 1992
- Milam, Lorenzo W. Cripzen: A Manual for Survival. San Diego, CA: Mho & Mho Works, 1993. ISBN 9780917320026
- RALPH: The Review of Arts, Literature, Philosophy and the Humanities (as Publisher/Editor; 294 online issues), 1994-2019
- Gallant, Jonathan A, and Lorenzo W. Milam. Gringolándia: A Guide for Puzzled Mexicans. San Diego, CA: Mho & Mho Works, 1997. ISBN 9780917320064
- A Cricket in the Telephone (At Sunset): Poems from the Fessenden Review (as Lolita Lark, editor), 1998
- Lorenzo Wilson Milam: Life Among The Walkies. San Diego, CA: Mho & Mho Works, 2018. OCLC 993752226

== Links ==
- KRAB Archive (Audio, program guides, photos, and history)
