= List of community radio stations in the United States =

Following is a list of FCC-licensed community radio stations in the United States, including both full-power and low-power non-commercial educational services. The list is divided into two sections:

- Full-power community stations
- Low-power community stations

== Full-power community stations ==
The following are full-power community radio stations licensed by the Federal Communications Commission (FCC).

Call sign	Frequency	City of license	State	ERP (watts)	Start Year
KABF	88.3 FM	Little Rock	Arkansas	100,000	1984
KAFM	88.1 FM	Grand Junction	Colorado	300	1994
KALW	91.7 FM	San Francisco	California	1,900	1941
KAOS	89.3 FM	Olympia	Washington	1,250	1973
KAXE	91.7 FM	Grand Rapids	Minnesota	100,000	1976
KAZI	88.7 FM	Austin	Texas	1,700	1982
KBBF	89.1 FM	Santa Rosa	California	420	1973
KBBG	88.1 FM	Waterloo	Iowa	9,500	1978
KBCS	91.3 FM	Bellevue	Washington	1,800	1973
KBCZ	90.1 FM	Boulder Creek	California	100	2012
KBFT	89.9 FM	Nett Lake	Minnesota	1,000	2011
KBOO	90.7 FM	Portland	Oregon	26,500	1968
KBUT	90.3 FM	Crested Butte	Colorado	1,000	1986
KCAW	104.7 FM	Sitka	Alaska	3,600	1982
KCBP	95.5 FM	Westley	California	6,000	2017
KCEI	90.1 FM	Red River	New Mexico	2,050	1997
KCEP	88.1 FM	Las Vegas	Nevada	10,000	1972
KCHU	88.1 FM	Valdez	Alaska	1,000	1986
KCNP	89.5 FM	Ada	Oklahoma	5,800	1998
KCSB	91.9 FM	Santa Barbara	California	620	1962
KDBN	101.1 FM	Parachute	Colorado	425	2008
KDKO	89.5 FM	Ada	Oklahoma	800	2009
KDNA	91.9 FM	Yakima	Washington	18,500	1979
KDNK	88.1 FM	Glenwood Springs	Colorado	1,200	1983
KDUP	88.1 FM	Cedarville	California	270	2008
KDUR	91.9 FM	Durango	Colorado	6,000	1983
KDVS	90.3 FM	Davis	California	13,000	1968
KECG	88.1 FM	El Cerrito	California	17	1978
KEOM	88.5 FM	Mesquite	Texas	61,000	1984
KEUL	88.9 FM	Girdwood	Alaska	1,400	1998
KFAI	90.3 FM	Minneapolis	Minnesota	900	1978
KFBR	91.5 FM	Gerlach	Nevada	600	2011
KFCF	88.1 FM	Fresno	California	2,400	1975
KFFR	88.3 FM	Winter Park	Colorado	10,000	2015
KFGM	101.5 FM	Frenchtown	Montana	3,600	2007
KFJC	89.7 FM	Los Altos Hills	California	110	1959
KGFN	89.1 FM	Goldfield	Nevada	1,000	2011
KGHR	91.3 FM	Tuba City	Arizona	100,000	1989
KGLP	91.7 FM	Gallup	New Mexico	800	1991
KGLT	91.9 FM	Bozeman	Montana	12,000	1968
KGNU	88.5 FM	Boulder	Colorado	5,000	1978
KGUA	88.3 FM	Gualala	California	2,800	2008
KGUD	90.7 FM	Longmont	Colorado	100	1975
KGVA	88.1 FM	Fort Belknap Agency	Montana	95,000	1952
KGVM	95.9 FM	Bozeman	Montana	3,600	2018
KHDC	90.9 FM	Chualar	California	3,000	1981
KHEW	88.5 FM	Rocky Boy Reservation	Montana	16,000	2008
KHOI	89.1 FM	Story City	Iowa	2,750	2012
KHOL	89.1 FM	Jackson	Wyoming	2,200	2008
KIDE	91.3 FM	Hoopa	California	195	1980
KISL	88.7 FM	Avalon	California	200	1988
KIYE	88.3 FM	Lapwai	Idaho	15,000	2010
KKCR	90.9 FM	Hanalei	Hawaii	900	1997
KKFI	90.1 FM	Kansas City	Missouri	100,000	1988
KKRN	88.5 FM	Bella Vista	California	600	2008
KKUP	91.5 FM	Cupertino	California	200	1972
KKWE	89.9 FM	White Earth	Minnesota	60,000	2011
KLND	89.5 FM	Little Eagle	South Dakota	100,000	1997
KMOJ	89.9 FM	Minneapolis	Minnesota	6,200	1978
KMPO	88.7 FM	Modesto	California	2,050	1984
KMUD	91.1 FM	Garberville	California	9,000	1987
KMUE	88.1 FM	Eureka	California	10,000	1995
KMUN	91.9 FM	Astoria	Oregon	7,200	1983
KMUZ	88.5 FM	Turner	Oregon	32	2011
KNIZ	90.1 FM	Gallup	New Mexico	800	2009
KNON	89.3 FM	Dallas	Texas	55,000	1983
KNSJ	89.1 FM	San Diego	California	330	2013
KOHN	91.9 FM	Sells	Arizona	10,000	2000
KOJB	90.1 FM	Cass Lake	Minnesota	18,000	2009
KOOP	91.7 FM	Hornsby	Texas	3,000	1994
KOPN	89.5 FM	Columbia	Missouri	36,000	1973
KOSW	88.9 FM	Ocean Shores	Washington	96	2004
KOTO	91.7 FM	Telluride	Colorado	8,400	1975
KOYA	88.1 FM	Rosebud	South Dakota	51,000	2011
KPCW	91.7 FM	Park City	Utah	1,800	1980
KPFZ	88.1 FM	Lakeport	California	300	2001
KPOO	89.5 FM	San Francisco	California	270	1972
KPOV	88.9 FM	Bend	Oregon	1,100	2005
KPRI	91.3 FM	Pala	California	100	2010
KPTZ	91.9 FM	Port Townsend	Washington	1,950	2011
KQNY	91.9 FM	Quincy	California	2,700	2004
KRBX	89.9 FM	Boise	Idaho	7,900	2011
KRCL	90.9 FM	Salt Lake City	Utah	25,000	1979
KRFC	88.9 FM	Fort Collins	Colorado	3,000	2003
KRFP	90.3 FM	Moscow	Idaho	1,100	2004
KRTS	93.5 FM	Marfa	Texas	33,000	2007
KRVM	91.9 FM	Eugene	Oregon	15,000	1947
KRZA	88.7 FM	Alamosa	Colorado	9,800	1985
KSER	90.7 FM	Everett	Washington	5,800	1991
KSFR	101.1 FM	White Rock	New Mexico	2,500	1966
KSJD	91.5 FM	Cortez	Colorado	1,200	1990
KSJV	91.5 FM	Fresno	California	16,000	1980
KSKQ	89.5 FM	Ashland	Oregon	560	2007
KSRQ	90.1 FM	Thief River Falls	Minnesota	24,000	1971
KSOI	91.9 FM	Murray	Iowa	19,000	2012
KSQD	90.7 FM	Santa Cruz	California	320	2018
KSQM	91.5 FM	Sequim	Washington	700	
KSUT	91.3 FM	Ignacio	Colorado	2,000	1976
KSVR	91.7 FM	Mount Vernon	Washington	170	1973
KSVU	90.1 FM	Mount Vernon	Washington	330	2011
KTNA	88.9 FM	Talkeetna	Alaska	7,200	1993
KTQX	90.1 FM	Bakersfield	California	570	
KUBO	88.7 FM	Calexico	California	3,000	
KUHB	91.9 FM	Saint Paul	Alaska	15,000	1984
KURU	89.1 FM	Silver City	New Mexico	10,500	2011
KUYI	88.1 FM	Kykotsmovi	Arizona	69,000	2000
KVMR	89.5 FM	Nevada City	California	1,750	1978
KVNF	90.9 FM	Paonia	Colorado	2,600	1979
KVRF	89.5 FM	Sutton	Alaska	360	2011
KWMR	90.5 FM	Point Reyes	California	235	1999
KWSO	91.9 FM	Warm Springs	Oregon	4,300	1986
KXCI	91.3 FM	Tucson	Arizona	340	1983
KXGA	90.5 FM	Glennallen	Alaska	3,200	1994
KXSW	89.9 FM	Sisseton	South Dakota	1,000	
KYAY	91.1 FM	San Carlos	Arizona	1,900	2012
KYRS	88.1 FM	Spokane	Washington	6,800	2003
KZCT	89.5 FM	Vallejo	California	7	2011
KZFR	90.1 FM	Chico	California	6,300	1990
KZGM	88.1 FM	Cabool	Missouri	12,500	2009
KZMU	90.1 FM	Moab	Utah	400	1992
KZUM	89.3 FM	Lincoln	Nebraska	1,500	1978
KZYX	90.7 FM	Philo	California	3,400	
WAIF	88.3 FM	Cincinnati	Ohio	1,600	1975
WARA	1320 AM	Attleboro	Massachusetts	5,000	2015
WAZU	90.7 FM	Peoria	Illinois	500	2010
WBER	90.5 FM	Rochester	New York	2,500	1985
WBEW	89.5 FM	Chesterton	Indiana	4,000	1995
WBSD	89.1 FM	Burlington	Wisconsin	210	1975
WCUW	91.3 FM	Worcester	Massachusetts	630	1973
WDBX	91.1 FM	Carbondale	Illinois	3,000	1996
WDIY	88.1 FM	Allentown	Pennsylvania	300	1995
WDNA	88.9 FM	Miami	Florida	7,400	1977
WDRT	91.9 FM	Viroqua	Wisconsin	480	2010
WDVR	89.7 FM	Delaware Township	New Jersey	3,800	1990
WDVX	89.9 FM	Clinton	Tennessee	200	1991
WEFT	90.1 FM	Champaign	Illinois	10,000	1981
WERU	89.9 FM	Blue Hill	Maine	11,500	1988
WEVL	89.9 FM	Memphis	Tennessee	4,800	1976
WFAR	93.3 FM	Danbury	Connecticut	15	1981
WFHB	91.3 FM	Bloomington	Indiana	1,600	1993
WFMR	92.1 FM	Provincetown	Massachusetts	6,000	1982
WFMU	91.1 FM	East Orange	New Jersey	1,250	1958
WGDH	91.7 FM	Harwick	Vermont	1,100	2011
WGDR	91.1 FM	Plainfield	Vermont	920	1973
WGXC	90.7 FM	Acra	New York	125	2011
WGZS	89.1 FM	Cloquet	Minnesota	50,000	2011
WHCR	88.1 FM	New York City	New York	8	1986
WHDD	91.9 FM	Sharon	Connecticut	650	2008
WHDZ	101.5 FM	Buxton	North Carolina	130	2008
WINO	91.9 FM	Watkins Glen	New York	420	2012
WITT	91.9 FM	Zionsville	Indiana	6,000	2009
WJFF	90.5 FM	Jeffersonville	New York	3,700	1990
WKNY	1490 AM	Kingston	New York	1,000	2017
WMHS	88.1 FM	Pike Creek	Delaware	88	1998
WMKV	89.3 FM	Reading	Ohio	410	1995
WMMT	88.7 FM	Whitesburg	Kentucky	15,000	1985
WMNF	88.5 FM	Tampa	Florida	7,000	1979
WMPG	90.9 FM	Portland	Maine	4,500	1974
WNCU	90.7 FM	Durham	North Carolina	50,000	1995
WNMC	90.7 FM	Traverse City	Michigan	600	1967
WNRN	91.9 FM	Charlottesville	Virginia	320	1996
WOBO	88.7 FM	Batavia	Ohio	15,500	1988
WOJB	88.9 FM	Reserve	Wisconsin	100,000	1982
WOMR	92.1 FM	Provincetown	Massachusetts	6,000	1982
WOOL	91.5 FM	Bellows Falls	Vermont	550	2014
WORT	89.9 FM	Madison	Wisconsin	2,000	1975
WOVV	90.1 FM	Ocracoke	North Carolina	650	2010
WPKN	89.5 FM	Bridgeport	Connecticut	10,000	1963
WPRB	103.3 FM	Princeton	New Jersey	14,000	1940
WRCT	88.3 FM	Pittsburgh	Pennsylvania	17,500	1974
WRDV	89.3 FM	Warminster	Pennsylvania	100	1976
WRFI	88.1 FM	Ithaca	New York	100	2002
WRFG	89.3 FM	Atlanta	Georgia	65,000	1973
WRGY	90.5 FM	Rangeley	Maine	90	2010
WRLN	105.3 FM	Red Lake	Minnesota	100,000	2022
WTCC	90.7 FM	Springfield	Massachusetts	4,000	1971
WTIP	90.7 FM	Grand Marais	Minnesota	25,000	1998
WVMR	1370 AM	Frost	West Virginia	5,000	1981
WVMR	91.9 FM	Hillsboro	West Virginia	550	2010
WVPH	90.3 FM	Piscataway	New Jersey	500	1950
WWER	88.1 FM	Colonial Beach	Virginia	100	2010
WWOZ	90.7 FM	New Orleans	Louisiana	100,000	1980
WWUH	91.3 FM	West Hartford	Connecticut	440	1968
WXPI	88.5 FM	Jersey Shore	Pennsylvania	110	2010
WXPR	91.7 FM	Rhinelander	Wisconsin	100,000	1983
WYAR	88.3 FM	Yarmouth	Maine	1,000	1998
WYCE	88.1 FM	Grand Rapids	Michigan	10,000	1983
WYEP	91.3 FM	Pittsburgh	Pennsylvania	18,000	1974
WYXR	91.7 FM	Memphis	Tennessee	25,000	2020

== Low-power community stations ==
The following stations are Low Power FM (LPFM) broadcast radio services licensed by the Federal Communications Commission. To be included in the listing, stations must have Wikipedia pages.

Call sign	Frequency	City of license	State	ERP (watts)	Start Year
KAAD-LP	103.5 FM	Sonora	California	100	2014
KAVZ-LP	102.5 FM	Deming	Washington	100	2004
KBMF-LP	102.5 FM	Butte	Montana	100	2015
KBPT-LP	96.1 FM	Bishop	California	100	2015
KBRP-LP	96.1 FM	Bisbee	Arizona	5	2004
KBUU-LP	99.1 FM	Malibu	California	71	2015
KCFL-LP	105.1 FM	Aberdeen	Washington	100	2015
KCUW-LP	104.3 FM	Pendleton	Oregon	100	2003
KCYB-LP	103.5 FM	Cypress	Texas	22	2014
KDEE-LP	97.5 FM	Sacramento	California	57	2004
KDPT-LP	102.9 FM	Dos Palos	California	100	2001
KDRT-LP	95.7 FM	Davis	California	99	2004
KEBF-LP	97.3 FM	Morro Bay	California	100	2014
KETQ-LP	93.3 FM	Yuba City	California	88	2015
KFFP-LP	90.3 FM	North Portland	Oregon	100	2016
KFOK-LP	95.1 FM	Georgetown	California	1	2001
KFUG-LP	101.1 FM	Crescent City	California	100	2015
KGGV-LP	95.1 FM	Guerneville	California	100	2005
KGPC-LP	96.9	Oakland	California	100	2015
KGTN-LP	106.7 FM	Georgetown	Texas	12	2003
KHEN-LP	106.9 FM	Salida	CO	100	2003
KILN-LP	99.1 FM	Alturus	California	100	2014
KITC-LP	106.5 FM	Gilchrist	Oregon	6	
KHBL-LP	96.9 FM	Hannibal	Missouri	100	2003
KJBB-LP	94.7 FM	Brownsboro	Texas	100	2015
KKDS-LP	97.7 FM	Eureka	California	100	2006
KLDK-LP	96.5 FM	Dixon	New Mexico	100	2004
KLLG-LP	97.9 FM	Willits	California	100	2014
KLOT-LP	107.7 FM	Austin County	Texas	58	2016
KLZL-LP	90.7 FM	Ten Sleep	Wyoming	100	2014
KMKB-LP	98.9 FM	Marfa	Texas	50	2007
KMRD-LP	96.9 FM	Madrid	New Mexico	35	2014
KMRE-LP	102.3 FM	Bellingham	Washington	100	2006
KNIL-LP	95.9 FM	Creighton	Nebraska	100	
KNKR-LP	96.1 FM	Hawi	Hawaii	100	2015
KNYO-LP	107.7 FM	Fort Bragg	California	87	2006
KOCZ-LP	94.9 FM	Opelousas	Louisiana	72	2003
KONA-LP	100.5 FM	Kailua-Kona	Hawaii	100	2017
KOPO-LP	88.9 FM	Paia	Hawaii	100	2005
KORC-LP	105.9 FM	Corvallis	Oregon	100	2021
KORE-LP	99.1 FM	Entiat	Washington	100	
KOYO-LP	88.9 FM	Paia	Hawaii	100	
KPCN-LP	95.9 FM	Woodburn	Oregon	31	2006
KPUP-LP	100.5 FM	Patagonia	Arizona	50	2005
KPYT-LP	100.3 FM	Tucson	Arizona	100	2005
KREV-LP	104.7 FM	Estes Park	Colorado	100	2003
KRFF-LP	95.59 FM	Fargo	North Dakota	50	2010
KSAP-LP	96.9 FM	Port Arthur	Texas	100	2005
KSCW-LP	103.1 FM	Sun West City	Arizona	100	2017
KTDT-LP	99.1 FM	Tucson	Arizona	50	2015
KTTF-LP	95.3 FM	Tomball	Texas	91	2015
KUAA-LP	99.9 FM	Salt Lake City	Utah	100	
KUBU-LP	96.5 FM	Sacramento	California	45	2014
KVRU-LP	105.7 FM	Seattle	Washington	100	2017
KVSH-LP	101.9 FM	Vashon	Washington	7	
KWNK-LP	97.7 FM	Reno	Nevada	7	2017
KWSS-LP	93.9 FM	Scottsdale	Arizona	2	2005
KWVH-LP	104.3 FM	Wimberley	Texas	15	2015
KXPB-LP	89.1 FM	Washington	Washington	17	
KXRN-LP	104.7 FM	Laguna Beach	California	100	2012
KXRW-LP	99.9 FM	Vancouver	Washington	100	2016
KXSF-LP	102.5 FM	San Francisco	California	2	2018
KYTF-LP	94.7 FM	Blair	Nebraska	12	
KZAS-LP	95.1 FM	Hood River	Oregon	100	2004
KZCC-LP	106.1 FM	Conroe	Texas	7	2016
KZCW-LP	104.5 FM	Conroe	Texas	8	2016
WALH-LP	106.7 FM	Wilmington	Ohio	100	2015
WAWL-LP	103.6 FM	Grand Haven	Michigan	100	2014
WAYO-LP	104.3 FM	Rochester	New York	39	2016
WBCA-LP	102.9 FM	Boston	Massachusetts	14	2016
WBCM-LP	100.1 FM	Bristol	Virginia	64	2015
WBCR-LP	97.7 FM	Great Barrington	Massachusetts	100	2004
WBFY-LP	100.9 FM	Belfast	Maine	100	2016
WBTV-LP	99.3	Burlington	Vermont	100	2017
WCFA-LP	101.5 FM	Cape May	New Jersey	83	2006
WCIW-LP	107.7 FM	Immokalee	Florida	100	2004
WCOM-LP	103.5 FM	Chapel Hill	North Carolina	100	2004
WCRS-LP	92.7 FM	Columbus	Ohio	54	2007
WDTZ-LP	98.1 FM	Delhi Township	Ohio	39	2014
WEES-LP	107.9 FM	Ocean City	Maryland	15	2004
WEQY-LP	104.7 FM	Saint Paul	Minnesota	100	2015
WERA-LP	96.7 FM	Arlington	Virginia	21	2015
WFAQ-LP	101.3 FM	Mukwonago	Wisconsin	100	2007
WFCB-LP	100.7 FM	Ferndale	Michigan	100	2016
WFNU-LP	94.1	Saint Paul	Minnesota	100	2016
WFOV-LP	92.1 FM	Flint	Michigan	85	2016
WHAV-LP	97.9 FM	Haverhill	Massachusetts	4	2016
WHGE-LP	95.3 FM	Wilmington	Delaware	50	2018
WHUP-LP	104.7 FM	Hillsborough	North Carolina	24	2015
WHYR-LP	96.9 FM	Baton Rouge	Louisiana	25	2011
WHYS-LP	96.3 FM	Eau Claire	Wisconsin	100	2005
WIOM-LP	101.7 FM	Springfield	Massachusetts	100	2017
WIWI-LP	99.7 FM	Milwaukee	Wisconsin	80	2018
WJOP-LP	96.3 FM	Newburyport	Massachusetts	100	2016
WJUP-LP	103.9 FM	Jupiter	Florida	100	2003
WKJJ-LP	101.3 FM	Milwaukee	Wisconsin	100	
WLPN-LP	105.5 FM	Chicago	Illinois	17	2015
WLPZ-LP	95.1 FM	Leominster	Massachusetts	21	2017
WLSP-LP	103.5 FM	Sun Prairie	Wisconsin	22	2015
WMCB-LP	107.9 FM	Greenfield	Massachusetts	100	2008
WMRW-LP	94.5 FM	Warren	Vermont	100	
WMSZ-LP	95.9 FM	Hartsville	South Carolina	100	2002
WMXP-LP	95.5 FM	Greenville	South Carolina	86	2007
WNRB-LP	93.3 FM	Wausau	Wisconsin	6	
WNUC-LP	96.7 FM	Detroit	Michigan	58	2016
WOCT-LP	101.9 FM	Oshkosh	Wisconsin	100	2006
WOMM-LP	105.9 FM	Burlington	Vermont	100	2007
WOWD-LP	94.3 FM	Takoma Park	Maryland	20	2016
WPJQ-LP	101.3	Milwaukee	Wisconsin	100	
WPPP-LP	100.7 FM	Athens	Georgia	100	2004
WPVM-LP	103.7 FM	Asheville	North Carolina	100	2003
WQRZ-LP	103.5 FM	Bay Saint Louis	Mississippi	100	2003
WRPO-LP	93.5 FM	Russells Point	Ohio	100	2002
WSCQ-LP	96.3 FM	Sun City Center	Florida	91	
WSIM-LP	103.5 FM	Simsbury	Connecticut	100	
WQSV-LP	106.3 FM	Staunton	Virginia	100	2015
WRBG-LP	106.5 FM	Millsboro	Delaware	100	2002
WRFN-LP	107.1 FM	Pasquo	Tennessee	7	2005
WRGG-LP	93.7 FM	Greencastle	Pennsylvania	29	2016
WRFA-LP	107.9 FM	Jamestown	New York	100	2004
WRFR-LP	93.3 FM	Rockland	Maine	100	2002
WRIR-LP	97.3 FM	Richmond	Virginia	42	2004
WRRS-LP	104.3 FM	Pittsfield	Massachusetts	100	2005
WSCA-LP	106.1 FM	Portsmouth	New Hampshire	100	2004
WSFM-LP	103.3 FM	Asheville	North Carolina	100	2015
WSLR-LP	96.5 FM	Sarasota	Florida	23	2005
WSPJ-LP	103.3 FM	Syracuse	New York	100	2017
WTND-LP	106.3	McDonough County	Illinois	100	2003
WTSQ-LP	88.1 FM	Charleston	West Virginia	100	2014
WVAO-LP	105.9 FM	Athol	Massachusetts	59	2015
WVEW-LP	107.7 FM	Brattleboro	Vermont	100	2006
WVMO-LP	98.7 FM	Madison	Wisconsin	100	2015
WVQC-LP	95.7 FM	Cincinnati	Ohio	12	2010
WVVX-LP	101.1	[Providence	Rhode Island	100	2000
WVVY-LP	96.7 FM	Tisbury	Massachusetts	93	2007
WAST-LP	95.1 FM	Kent County	Rhode Island	24	2016
WXCS-LP	92.9 FM	Cambridge Springs	Pennsylvania	100	2004
WXGR-LP	103.5 FM	Dover	New Hampshire	13	2003
WXHR-LP	97.3 FM	Hillman	Michigan	100	
WXMR-LP	94.3 FM	Marengo	Illinois	100	
WXNA-LP	101.5 FM	Nashville	Tennessee	100	2016
WXNZ-LP	98.1 FM	Skowhegan	Maine	2	2015
WXOJ-LP	103.3 FM	Northampton	Massachusetts	100	2005
WXRW-LP	104.1 FM	Milwaukee	Wisconsin	100	2016
WXTF-LP	97.9 FM	Harrisville	Michigan	100	2014
WYAP-LP	101.7 FM	Clay	West Virginia	100	2004
WZML-LP	92.9	Bryn Mawr	Pennsylvania	5	2016
WZMO-LP	107.1	Marion	Ohio	100	2014

== See also ==
- AM broadcasting
- FM broadcasting
- Internet radio
- List of college radio stations in the United States
- List of community radio stations in Canada
- List of independent radio stations
- List of internet radio stations
- List of Pacifica Radio stations and affiliates
- List of radio stations in the United States
- Low-power broadcasting
- Radio format
