= WHYS =

WHYS may refer to:

- World: Have Your Say, a current events radio show with a worldwide audience from the BBC World Service
- WHYS-LP, a low-power radio station (96.3 FM) licensed to Eau Claire, Wisconsin, United States
