= KVRF =

- Sutton, Alaska; United States
- Broadcast area: Palmer, Alaska, and the Matanuska-Susitna Valley
- Frequency: 89.5 MHz
- Branding: Big Cabbage Radio

Programming
- Format: Variety
- Affiliations: National Federation of Community Broadcasters

Ownership
- Owner: Radio Free Palmer, Inc.

History
- First air date: August 23, 2011
- Call sign meaning: Valley Radio Free

Technical information
- Licensing authority: FCC
- Facility ID: 177165
- Class: A
- ERP: 360 watts
- HAAT: −435 m (−1,427 ft)
- Transmitter coordinates: 61°44′18.2″N 148°54′26.6″W
- Translators: K209FY (89.7 MHz, Palmer)
- Repeaters: KVRK (88.3 MHz, Chickaloon)

Links
- Public license information: Public file; LMS
- Website: www.bigcabbageradio.org

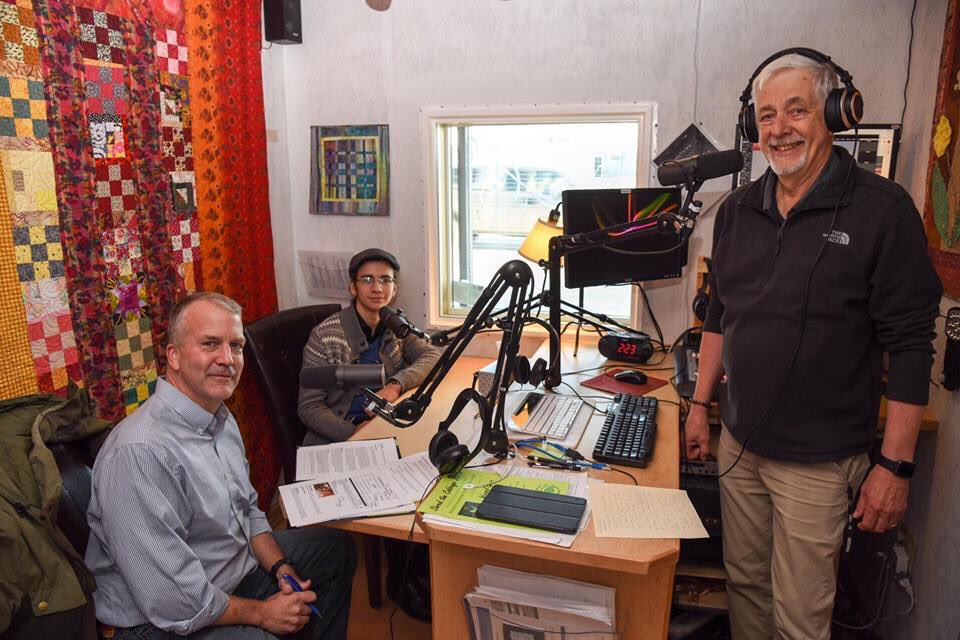
Senator Dan Sullivan on the air on KVRF in 2018.

KVRF (89.5 FM), branded Big Cabbage Radio, is a community radio station licensed to Sutton, Alaska, United States. Based in nearby Palmer, Alaska, the station broadcasts to the Matanuska-Susitna Valley with transmitters serving Sutton, Palmer, and Chickaloon. The station airs a wide variety of music, including classical, folk, country, bluegrass, blues, jazz, soul, new-age and tropical, as well as local and national shows. KVRF is owned by Radio Free Palmer, Inc.

== History ==
Radio Free Palmer, named after Radio Free Europe, was formed in April 2005 to seek a permit to build a community radio station to serve the Palmer area. In the meantime, it offered podcasts and organized events to gauge community interest, including a talent show; it also provided archived audio of school board meetings and internet access to downtown Palmer. By 2008, the Federal Communications Commission (FCC) had granted a construction permit for the station; though backers hoped to be on the air in 2009 or 2010, KVRF began broadcasting on August 23, 2011, using a transmitter gifted by KTNA in Talkeetna. Licensed to Sutton, it was inaudible in Palmer until KSKA donated its translator on Lazy Mountain to extend the service later that year.

== Translators ==
Call sign	Frequency	City of license	FID	ERP (W)	HAAT	Class	FCC info
K209FY	89.7 FM	Palmer, Alaska	807	65	9 m (30 ft)	D	LMS

== See also ==
- List of community radio stations in the United States
