= WRFQ =

WRFQ may refer to:

- WRFQ (FM), a radio station (104.5 FM) licensed to Mount Pleasant, South Carolina, United States
- WVQC-LP, a low-power radio station (95.7 FM) licensed to Cincinnati, Ohio, United States, which held the call sign WRFQ-LP from November 2008 to February 2009
- WYRF-LP, a low-power radio station (92.5 FM) licensed to serve Florence, South Carolina, United States, which held the call sign WRFQ-LP in 2014
