= Crooked Flower =

American pop rock band

- Origin: Berkeley, California
- Genres: Rock, alternative rock, experimental
- Years active: 2013–present
- Website: www.crookedflower.com

Crooked Flower is a pop rock band from Berkeley, California.

== Musical career ==
Formed by musicians seeking to develop upon past collaborations, Crooked Flower's first recordings were done in Green Day's Jingletown Studios and engineered by Lee Bothwick, known for his work with NOFX and Machine Head (band). It was at this time that they developed a relationship with producer Gordon Brislawn, known for his work with Herbie Herbert and The Expendables (American band). Out of the Jingletown sessions came their debut EP, Between Two Stars which caught the attention of community radio station KUBU-LP DJ, Mike Lidskin. Consequently, he awarded them the stations 2015 'Song of the Year' award for their song 'Too Broke to Fix' and the 'Concert of the Year' award for a performance in September of the same year. In conjunction with this the band released their first music videos for the tracks 'Too Broke to Fix' and 'Between Two Stars'.

In 2015 the band returned once more to the studio, to record once more with Lee Bothwick and Gordon Brislawn. These sessions, in conjunction with four tracks from Between Two Stars would go on to become the End of the Rainbow, the band's debut full length record. To promote the record the band continued their tradition of promotional videos, this time for the tracks 'Fire' and 'No More'. Regular studio trips led to the rapid conception of two more records, The Moon, Anyway and On My Mind, both of which were released in 2017. This was accompanied by the band's first touring experience from which the band captured archival footage for future release. These live performances grew into multiple live videos released in 2018, including 'Came To Me In Dreams' which has since cleared 50,000 views on YouTube.

In May 2018, the band released an EP, Darkness and Light, including tracks recorded with Jeff Goodlund, an educator at the SAE Institute. Substream Magazine said "you're gonna want to spend the 24 minutes it takes to experience it in full." Just a few months later, in July 2018 the band released the 'live in the studio' album, Blooming: Live At Lightrail Studios, which was recorded on a previous tour. By October of that year the band released another full length album, Into The Light. Obscure Sound wrote of the record, "Their new album, Into The Light, is an impressive one, led by lush grooves and Angie Dang’s smooth vocals."

To promote their 2017-18 music releases, in 2019 the band announced plans to release nine music videos, the first of which was for the track, 'Around and Around'. Within three weeks of release the video had gained nearly 250,000 views. The follow-up, 'The Belt' cleared 160,000 views on YouTube within a week of its premier.

== Critical reception ==
Crooked Flower received critical acclaim throughout their career. They have been called "party favorites" and "caught somewhere between the spacey-ness of The Grateful Dead and the moody bite of The Cure," by The Big Takeover. Shockya said of the band's 2018 EP Darkness and Light that they had "smart arrangements and clean production value." Meanwhile, The Spill Magazine wrote that the band, "hits all the sweet spots."

Not all criticism was as positive though: College Media Network wrote some tracks on Into The Light were, "a bit too basic." Meanwhile, No Depression (magazine) claimed the EP, Darkness And Light, only offered, "a very small cross-section of material to nitpick for fans of the psychedelic." In 2018, PopMatters wrote the band, "presents something warm and smooth while also permitting themselves to jump off of the deep end into trippy melodies and ethereal instrumentation."

== Other endeavors ==
Bassist Daniel Erik Tenenbaum has toured nationally with soul rock Con Brio (band) among other projects. Similarly, drummer Pat Shields has recorded and toured with the funk and afro-Caribbean group Euforquestra.

In addition to serving as Crooked Flower's guitarist and primary songwriter, Dan Ingberman is an economist who has taught at University of California, Berkeley, Wharton School of the University of Pennsylvania, Washington University in St. Louis and Carnegie Mellon University. While at Wharton he won the 1991 Wharton School Outstanding Teaching Award. He has also contributed papers to the American Journal of Political Science, Journal of Environmental Economics and Management, and the Journal of Public Economics. He has also consulted in major litigation on behalf of entities including Google, major homebuilders, the DOJ, and tobacco companies.

== Discography ==
Year	Release name
2015	Between Two Stars
2016	End of the Rainbow
2017	The Moon, Anyway
2017	On My Mind
2018	Blooming: Live At Lightrail Studios
2018	Into The Light
