= WQSV =

WQSV may refer to:

- WQSV-LP, a low-power radio station (106.3 FM) licensed to serve Staunton, Virginia, United States
- WNTC (AM), a radio station (790 AM) licensed to serve Ashland City, Tennessee, United States, which carried the WQSV callsign from 1991 to 2013.
