= KSOI =

KSOI may refer to:

- Kaposi's sarcoma
- KSOI (FM), a radio station (91.9 FM) licensed to serve Murray, Iowa, United States
