= KFOK =

KFOK may refer to:

- KFOK-LP, a low-power radio station (95.1 FM) licensed to Georgetown, California, United States
- Francis S. Gabreski Airport (ICAO code KFOK)
