= WRBG =

WRBG may refer to:

- WRBG (FM), a radio station (98.3 FM) licensed to serve Mifflinburg, Pennsylvania, United States
- WRBG-LP, a low-power radio station (106.5 FM) licensed to serve Millsboro, Delaware, United States
