= WMRW-LP =

- Warren, Vermont; United States
- Frequency: 94.5 MHz

Programming
- Format: Variety
- Affiliations: Pacifica Radio Network

Ownership
- Owner: Rootswork Inc.

History
- Former frequencies: 95.1 MHz (2005–2016)

Technical information
- Licensing authority: FCC
- Facility ID: 133683
- Class: L1
- ERP: 100 watts
- HAAT: 8.0 meters (26.2 ft)
- Transmitter coordinates: 44°6′31.00″N 72°49′11.00″W

Links
- Public license information: LMS
- Webcast: Listen Live
- Website: wmrw.org

WMRW-LP (94.5 FM) is a radio station broadcasting a variety music format. Licensed to Warren, Vermont, United States, the station is owned by Rootswork Inc. It is a community radio station. There are 53 volunteers on the staff.

== See also ==
- List of community radio stations in the United States
