= KAZI =

Non-commercial community radio station in Austin, Texas

Austin, Texas; United States
- Broadcast area: Greater Austin
- Frequency: 88.7 MHz
- Branding: KAZI 88.7

Programming
- Format: Urban Contemporary/Community Radio

Ownership
- Owner: Austin Community Radio, Inc.

History
- First air date: August 29, 1982
- Call sign meaning: Kazi is Swahili for work

Technical information
- Licensing authority: FCC
- Class: A
- ERP: 1,700 watts
- HAAT: 107 meters (351 ft)
- Transmitter coordinates: 30.277°N 97.826°W
- Translator: (91.3 MHz) K217GJ (Austin)

Links
- Public license information: Public file; LMS
- Webcast: Listen live
- Website: http://www.kazifm.org/

KAZI (88.7 FM) is a listener-supported, non-commercial community radio station in Austin, Texas, United States. The transmitter site is located in Southwest Austin and the station has studios in North Austin. It is owned by Austin Community Radio, Inc., a Texas non-profit entity founded April 22, 1975.

== History ==
John Warfield, PhD (né John Lewis Warfield; 1938–2007), a University of Texas Professor of African-American studies, was the pioneering founder of KAZI-FM, a noncommercial radio station aimed at serving the African-American community in Austin. His success came with the help of his wife, Jan (née Jeanette Aycox; 1941–2015), several board members, and a host of volunteers and supporters. KAZI debuted on air August 29, 1982, 2 PM – forty-three years ago – broadcasting from a studio on Manor Road. Although its mission, before its debut, was to serve African-Americans of Austin, when it finally debuted, its focus had expanded to appeal to Hispanics and a general audience, according to the station's founding manager, Cheryl Anderson Strange (maiden; born 1947). Warfield was the founding President.

The station primarily features an urban contemporary radio format and also plays other styles of music such as R&B, Hip Hop, Gospel, Blues, Soul, Reggae, and Jazz. In addition, KAZI provides educational programming, community information, and independent news.

== See also ==
- List of community radio stations in the United States

== Bibliography ==
=== References ===
- "Professor John Warfield Dies at 71". UT News. Texas Newsletter. Austin: University of Texas. October 29, 2007.
- "'Future-proofing' Austin's only Black community radio station". Austin American-Statesman. June 24, 2025.
