= KOPO-LP =

- Paia, Hawaii; United States
- Broadcast area: Maui area
- Frequency: 88.9 MHz
- Branding: radiOpio 88.9fm

Programming
- Format: Variety

Ownership
- Owner: Paia Youth Council Inc.

History
- Former call signs: KEKI-LP (2005)

Technical information
- Licensing authority: FCC
- Facility ID: 131709
- Class: L1
- ERP: 100 watts
- HAAT: −80 meters (−260 ft)
- Transmitter coordinates: 20°55′7″N 156°23′6.5″W

Links
- Public license information: LMS
- Webcast: Listen Live
- Website: KOPO-LP Online

KOPO-LP (88.9 FM) is a radio station licensed to Paia, Hawaii, in the United States. The station, serving the Maui area, is owned by Paia Youth Council Inc.

== History ==
The station was assigned the call letters KEKI-LP on February 3, 2005. On July 7, 2005, the station changed its call sign to KOPO-LP.

== See also ==
- List of community radio stations in the United States
