= KOTO (FM) =

- Telluride, Colorado; United States
- Frequency: 91.7 (MHz) (HD Radio)

Programming
- Format: Public radio / Variety
- Affiliations: National Public Radio

Ownership
- Owner: San Miguel Educational Fund, Inc.

Technical information
- Licensing authority: FCC
- Class: C3
- ERP: 8,400 watts
- HAAT: -68 meters (-222 feet)
- Transmitter coordinates: 37°55′59″N 107°49′59″W

Links
- Public license information: Public file; LMS
- Webcast: Listen Live
- Website: www.koto.org

KOTO (91.7 FM) is a National Public Radio-affiliated radio station licensed to Telluride, Colorado, United States. The station is currently owned by San Miguel Educational Fund.

== Translators ==
In addition to the main station, KOTO is relayed by an additional four translators to widen its broadcast area.

Call sign	Frequency	City of license	FID	FCC info
K207AU	89.3 FM	Ophir, Colorado	58921	LMS
K207AS	89.3 FM	Pandora, Colorado	58914	LMS
K208FF	89.5 FM	Norwood, Colorado		
K287CC	105.3 FM	Placerville, Colorado	58919	LMS

== See also ==
- List of community radio stations in the United States
