= WCUW =

- Worcester, Massachusetts; United States
- Broadcast area: Central Massachusetts
- Frequency: 91.3 MHz
- Branding: WCUW 91.3 FM

Programming
- Format: Community radio

Ownership
- Owner: WCUW, Inc.; (WUW, Inc.)

History
- First air date: December 4, 1973
- Call sign meaning: Clark University Worcester

Technical information
- Licensing authority: FCC
- Facility ID: 74162
- Class: A
- ERP: 630 watts
- HAAT: 44 meters (144 ft)
- Transmitter coordinates: 42°15′46.3″N 71°47′57.2″W

Links
- Public license information: Public file; LMS
- Webcast: Listen live
- Website: www.wcuw.org

WCUW (91.3 FM) is a community radio station licensed to Worcester, Massachusetts, United States. The station, which broadcasts at 91.3 FM, is owned by WCUW, Inc., a nonprofit organization. WCUW is managed by a professional staff, while all of its programs are hosted by community volunteers.

== Station history ==
The station was started by Robert Goddard in 1920. Goddard was at that time a part-time Clark University physics instructor and researcher. He later went on to launch the first rocket and become known as 'the founder of modern rocketry'. While Goddard started the station in Atwood Hall, it later moved into a new office in the basement of Sanford Hall. This AM station could only be heard on campus and operated on 10 watts. WCUW began as an AM station at Clark University campus. Applications for radio licenses have been found in Clark University archives dating back to the early 1920s, and two successful licenses for three-month periods were granted first by the Department of Commerce's Bureau of Navy Radio Service and later by the Federal Radio Commission.

In 1973, an application was filed for WCUW to broadcast an FM signal off-campus. A sanction was put in place where radio stations either needed to increase their wattage or get kicked off the air. In 1976, WCUW increased to 100 watts covering all of the Worcester area as well as several surrounding communities.

The station quickly gained a national reputation for its eclectic programming, and by 1977, WCUW had a staff of nine employees and a budget of $130,000. During this time period WCUW introduced public affairs programming for Worcester's Hispanic community. WCUW broadcast approximately 20 hours of Hispanic programming each week including the United Press International news dispatches from South America. This was one of the most significant community outreach programs WCUW has ever done.

In 1979, the station received a power increase and through federal funding, purchased a new transmitter, as well as studio and remote broadcasting equipment. Relations with the university began to deteriorate, and in 1980, the station left the campus for new facilities on Worcester's Main Street. In 1985 WCUW signed a rebroadcast agreement with WBPV, the radio station at Bay Path Regional Vocational Technical High School. The agreement allowed WCUW to broadcast at 1,000 watts gaining the territory of Southern Massachusetts, to parts of Interstate 495; to Warwick, Rhode Island; to Nashua, New Hampshire. The WCUW community station programmers, known to play controversial music, were not well received and so in 1991 the rebroadcast agreement with Bay Path was not renewed. WCUW went back to its original 630 watts and as more stations gained wattage, the community of listeners has decreased to solely the Worcester area. The station struggled over the next few decades. While it was able to purchase its property, it eventually laid off its paid staff and transitioned to volunteer committees.

WCUW celebrated its 40-year anniversary on October 19–20, 2014. According to executive director, Troy Tyree, WCUW currently hosts 70 programs in 12 different languages.

== See also ==
- List of community radio stations in the United States
