= KOSW =

- Ocean Shores, Washington; United States
- Frequency: 88.9 MHz

Programming
- Format: Variety

Ownership
- Owner: City of Ocean Shores

History
- First air date: July 2004 (at 91.3 FM)
- Call sign meaning: Ocean Shores Washington

Technical information
- Licensing authority: FCC
- Facility ID: 134605
- Class: L1
- ERP: 76 watts
- HAAT: 35.2 meters
- Transmitter coordinates: 46°58′30.00″N 124°9′48.00″W

Links
- Public license information: Public file; LMS
- Website: http://www.koswradio.com

KOSW (88.9 FM) is an American radio station broadcasting a Variety format. It is licensed to Ocean Shores, Washington, United States. The station is owned by the City of Ocean Shores.

KOSW began operation in July 2004 at FM 91.3 as a non-profit organization by volunteers of the Ocean Shores, Washington community, The station's mission was to inform the residents of Ocean Shores and visitors of events and other need-to-know information including evacuation instructions in the event of an emergency. It is now owned by the city of Ocean Shores and operated as a public service to all the North Beach area communities.

The station continues to be staffed entirely by volunteers. Its programming features virtually every musical genre including "oldies", classic rock, big bands, jazz, country/western, classical, opera, talk and Celtic. Its DJs play music as well as disseminate Public Service Announcements (PSA), donor promotional spots and do live remote broadcasts for community events.

All programming is streamed live 24/7 over the Internet which can be accessed at the station's website, http://koswradio.com.

In November 2021 the Federal Communications Commission granted a construction permit to KOSW for a power and license class upgrade. After several modifications to the original application, the station currently has a construction permit to upgrade from 76 watts ERP @ 35 meters on 91.3 to full service status and an ERP of 1.2 kW @ 120 meters on 88.9 with a directional antenna. When completed, this upgrade should improve KOSW's coverage dramatically.

On Saturday, January 6, 2024, the station turned off its low power signal and turned on its full power signal.

== See also ==
- List of community radio stations in the United States
