= WXCS-LP =

Coordinates: 41.789°N 80.061°W

- Cambridge Springs, Pennsylvania; United States
- Broadcast area: Cambridge Springs, Pennsylvania and surrounding area
- Frequency: 92.9 (MHz)
- Branding: WXCS-FM 92.9

Programming
- Format: Community

Ownership
- Owner: Cambridge Community Radio Association

History
- First air date: July 1, 2004
- Call sign meaning: WX Cambridge Springs

Technical information
- Licensing authority: FCC
- Class: L1
- ERP: 90 watts
- HAAT: 31.4 meters (103 ft)

Links
- Public license information: LMS
- Website: http://wxcs.org

WXCS-LP is an independent, non-commercial radio station in Cambridge Springs, Pennsylvania. It is operated entirely by volunteers.

Broadcasting began July 1, 2004. The primary educational functions are to diversify the community's culture and raise awareness of a broad base of local issues. CCRA'S function is to facilitate and administrate educational, community-oriented local radio programming through an FCC licensed LP100 radio station. Programming will include locally originated music from area college and high school bands and choirs, as well as other local musicians. High school student radio programming and high school sports newscasting has been fostered. Religious education, agricultural and conservation education, community public service announcements and local newscasts are also goals and accomplishments that increase cultural awareness and foster educational diversity on the local level.

WXCS is an original independent-noncommercial-local radio station. In January, 2014 WXCS obtained a Comrex remote broadcast system and has embarked upon remote broadcasts ranging from high school football games to local community events.

== See also ==
- List of community radio stations in the United States
