= KYAY =

- San Carlos, Arizona; United States
- Broadcast area: San Carlos Apache Indian Reservation
- Frequency: 91.1 MHz
- Branding: San Carlos Apache Radio

Programming
- Format: Community radio

Ownership
- Owner: San Carlos Apache Tribe

Technical information
- Licensing authority: FCC
- Facility ID: 172840
- Class: C3
- ERP: 1,900 watts
- HAAT: 515.3 meters (1,691 ft)
- Transmitter coordinates: 33°34′30″N 110°22′42″W

Links
- Public license information: Public file; LMS
- Webcast: Listen live

KYAY (91.1 FM) is a Community radio station, owned and operated by the San Carlos Apache Tribe. Licensed to San Carlos, Arizona, the station serves the San Carlos Apache Indian Reservation.

== See also ==
- List of community radio stations in the United States
