= KWSO =

Warm Springs, Oregon; United States
- Frequency: 91.9 MHz (HD Radio)
- Branding: Warm Springs Radio

Programming
- Format: Hot Adult Contemporary

Ownership
- Owner: Confederated Tribes Warm Springs Reservation

Technical information
- Licensing authority: FCC
- Facility ID: 13582
- Class: C2
- ERP: 4,300 watts
- HAAT: 334.0 meters (1,095.8 ft)
- Transmitter coordinates: 44°50′24″N 121°13′56″W

Links
- Public license information: Public file; LMS
- Website: kwso.org

KWSO (91.9 FM, "Warm Springs Radio") is a radio station that broadcasts the Hot Adult Contemporary music format. Licensed to Warm Springs, Oregon, United States, the station is currently owned by the Confederated Tribes of Warm Springs reservation.

In 1950s and 1960s, KWSO was assigned to an AM station in Wasco, California, operating on 1050 kHz.

== See also ==
- List of community radio stations in the United States
