= WCFA-LP =

- Cape May, New Jersey; United States
- Broadcast area: Cape May-Wildwood, New Jersey
- Frequency: 101.5 MHz
- Branding: WCFA

Programming
- Language: English
- Format: Jazz/Variety/Talk

Ownership
- Owner: Center for Community Arts, Inc.

History
- First air date: November 28, 2006
- Call sign meaning: Center for Community Arts

Technical information
- Licensing authority: FCC
- Facility ID: 134095
- ERP: 83 watts
- HAAT: 32.77 meters (107.5 ft)
- Transmitter coordinates: 38°58′27.4″N 74°50′20.6″W

Links
- Public license information: LMS
- Webcast: Listen Live
- Website: capemayradio.org

WCFA-LP (101.5 FM) is a non-commercial low-power FM community radio station in Cape May, New Jersey, United States. The station is licensed to the Center For Community Arts, Inc., nonprofit organization that sponsors multicultural arts, humanities and history programs for young people and adults. It has been broadcasting 24 hours a day, seven days a week with an all-volunteer staff since first going on the air on November 28, 2006.

WCFA, which has its antenna located on the water tower in nearby Wildwood Crest, covers a 10-mile radius on the southern tip of New Jersey. The station's primary service area includes Cape May, West Cape May, The Wildwoods and Villas, but it can be heard as far north as Avalon on Seven Mile Island.

The station has a Variety music format. It also carries local public affairs programs, as well as shows on community history and features on local events and people in the community. WCFA can be streamed live on CapeMayRadio.org or by asking Siri, Alexa, Google to "Tune In Cape May Radio WCFA."

== See also ==
- List of community radio stations in the United States
