= WVVY-LP =

- Tisbury, Massachusetts; United States
- Broadcast area: Martha's Vineyard
- Frequency: 96.7 MHz

Programming
- Format: Community radio
- Affiliations: Pacifica Radio Network

Ownership
- Owner: Martha's Vineyard Community Radio, Inc.

History
- First air date: 2007
- Former frequencies: 93.7 MHz (2007–2015)

Technical information
- Licensing authority: FCC
- Facility ID: 135357
- Class: L1
- ERP: 93 watts
- HAAT: 30.8 meters
- Transmitter coordinates: 41°26′53.00″N 70°36′39.00″W

Links
- Public license information: LMS
- Webcast: Listen live
- Website: wvvy.org

WVVY-LP (96.7 FM) is a radio station licensed to Tisbury, Massachusetts, United States, and serving part of Martha's Vineyard. The station is owned by Martha's Vineyard Community Radio, Inc. It is a community radio station with a freeform format. WVVY-LP operates at 100 watts and has a range of three to five miles.

== See also ==
- List of community radio stations in the United States
