= WVQC-LP =

Cincinnati, Ohio; United States
- Frequency: 95.7 MHz
- Branding: 95.7 MRC

Programming
- Format: Variety, Community Station

Ownership
- Owner: Music Resource Center - Cincinnati

History
- First air date: July 2, 2010
- Former call signs: WRFQ-LP
- Call sign meaning: Voice of the Queen City

Technical information
- Licensing authority: FCC
- Facility ID: 132345
- Class: L1
- ERP: 12 watts
- HAAT: 85.9 meters (282 ft)
- Transmitter coordinates: 39°07′36″N 84°29′06″W

Links
- Public license information: LMS

WVQC-LP (95.7 FM) is a non-profit, low-power FM radio station in Cincinnati, Ohio, licensed on the frequency 95.7 to Music Resource Center - Cincinnati. The station goes by the name 95.7 MRC Cincinnati’s New Music.

The station currently has a construction permit from the U.S. Federal Communications Commission (FCC) and began broadcasting in July 2010. The call letters stand for Voice of the Queen City.

== History ==
WVQC-LP was issued a construction permit by the FCC on February 1, 2008. WVQC-LP started broadcasting on July 2, 2010 at 6P.M. with local content from the Cincinnati area. Previously it had been an Internet-radio only, but finally started broadcasting on 95.7 MHz in Cincinnati, Ohio. The antenna is located in Cincinnati's neighborhood named Walnut Hills atop of the Essex Studios and reaches a 3-4 mile radius.

Media Bridges Cincinnati Inc., who helped operate WVQC-LP, applied for a LPFM grant almost 10 years prior to the broadcasting date.

The station focuses on local talent and local music, unlike its commercial competitors. Many popular shows, such as Alternating Currents, from Cincinnati's other community radio station WAIF, switched over to WVQC-LP. WVQC-LP broadcast live on its first couple of days from the Northside Rock n Roll Carnival in celebration of the new station.

The station features programs produced by high school students and broadcasts community council meetings from the neighborhoods of Walnut Hills and Evanston.

== Time-sharing ==
As part of its licensing agreement, WVQC-LP will share its signal with two other low-power stations, licensed to the Holy Spirit Center in Norwood, Ohio and the Forest Hills School District in Cincinnati, Ohio.

== Format ==
WVQC-LP is a non-profit, community station with most programming done by volunteers.

== See also ==
- List of community radio stations in the United States
