= WITT (FM) =

- Zionsville, Indiana; United States
- Broadcast area: Indianapolis, Indiana
- Frequency: 91.9 MHz

Programming
- Format: Community

Ownership
- Owner: Kids First Incorporated

Technical information
- Licensing authority: FCC
- Facility ID: 91740
- Class: A
- ERP: 6,000 watts
- HAAT: 90.5 meters (297 ft)
- Transmitter coordinates: 40°00′14″N 86°28′14″W

Links
- Public license information: Public file; LMS
- Website: 919witt.org

WITT (91.9 FM) is a non-commercial educational radio station licensed to Zionsville, Indiana, United States. The station is owned by Kids First Incorporated. WITT airs a community radio format.

== History ==
Almost nine years after their initial application was filed in September 1998, this station received its original construction permit from the Federal Communications Commission on May 30, 2007. The new station was assigned the call letters WITT by the FCC on June 7, 2007. Regular broadcast operations began in June 2009.

WITT employs a unique format-less, format; in essence its programming is widely varied and ever changing. In addition, WITT encourages local listeners to produce shows for broadcast as well as airs programming from throughout the world. WITT is non-commercial station which relies on listener financial support as well as donations by various corporations. WITT has no paid-employees, as all work at the station is done on a volunteer basis. WITT was operated largely by its General Manager Jim Walsh until his death in April 2023 and today is operated by several of the station's board of directors and key volunteers.

== See also ==
- List of community radio stations in the United States
