= KVRU-LP =

Low-power radio station in southeast Seattle, Washington

Coordinates: 47°34′15.4″N 122°17′27.5″W

- Seattle, Washington; United States
- Broadcast area: Seattle, Washington
- Frequency: 105.7 MHz

Programming
- Format: News radio

Ownership
- Owner: Southeast Effective Development

Technical information
- Licensing authority: FCC
- Class: L1
- ERP: 100 watts
- HAAT: -1.69 meters

Links
- Public license information: LMS
- Website: kvru.org

KVRU-LP (105.7 FM) is a low-power local radio station in southeast Seattle, Washington. The station was formerly named Rainier Valley Radio after the Rainier Valley area, where it broadcasts. It is owned by Southeast Effective Development (SEED), a non-profit economic development agency serving southeastern Seattle, which raised $400,000 to fund the station. The station broadcasts from studios in the Rainier Square Plaza housing development. KVRU began broadcasting online in 2015 and launched on the FM frequency in September 2017.

The station serves the Rainier Valley neighborhood of Seattle, along with portions of Mount Baker, Georgetown, and Mercer Island. Currently, it is managed by a community organizer named Luzviminda Uzuri Carpenter also known as Lulu Carpenter. She is a local producer, educator, and artist.

== See also ==
- List of community radio stations in the United States
