= WDTZ-LP =

Coordinates: 39°05′20.673″N 84°36′15.0624″W

- Delhi Township, Ohio; United States
- Broadcast area: Western Cincinnati, Ohio; far northern Boone and Kenton County, Kentucky
- Frequency: 98.1 MHz
- Branding: Z 98

Programming
- Format: mostly '80s with some '70s & ‘90s hits (some programs feature '50s-'70s oldies)

Ownership
- Owner: Delhi Public Radio, Inc

History
- First air date: June 30, 2014
- Call sign meaning: We're Delhi Township's Z 98

Technical information
- Licensing authority: FCC
- Facility ID: 192655
- Class: L1
- ERP: 32 watts
- HAAT: 170.6 feet

Links
- Public license information: LMS
- Webcast: http://www.z98fm.com/#!/page_AUDIO
- Website: http://www.z98fm.com

WDTZ-LP, better known by its brand name Z 98, is a low power FM radio station in the Cincinnati, Ohio market. It broadcasts mostly a '80s-based hit music format but has recently begun playing occasional ’70s & ’90s music. It is owned by Delhi Public Radio, Inc.

WDTZ-LP is a 501(C)(3) non-profit, community station with most programming done by volunteers. As such, it relies on donations to help meet expenses.

== Station history ==
In October 2013, Delhi Public Radio applied for the LPFM station on 98.1. They were the only applicant for this license. On February 19, 2014, a construction permit was granted. Equipment testing began the first week of June 2014. Program testing began on June 15, 2014. On June 24, 2014, the station applied to the FCC for their full license to cover the construction permit. On June 30, 2014, the FCC granted the license.

== Format ==
In an effort to recreate the sound of a top 40 radio station from the 1980s, WDTZ-LP uses bumpers and jingles that were commonly heard on those stations during that time. The station also tends to play more songs that charted in lower regions of the top 40 chart (and even songs that missed the top 40 chart but charted on the Billboard Hot 100) than most oldies stations rather than playing exclusively gold or recurrent singles.

== See also ==
- List of community radio stations in the United States
