= KHOL =

- Jackson, Wyoming; United States
- Frequency: 89.1 MHz
- Branding: 89.1 KHOL

Programming
- Format: Community radio
- Affiliations: Rocky Mountain Radio Network; Public Radio Exchange; Radio Bilingüe

Ownership
- Owner: Jackson Hole Community Radio, Incorporated

History
- First air date: April 5, 2008
- Former call signs: KURT (2005–2007); KJXN (2007–2008)
- Call sign meaning: For Jackson "Hole"

Technical information
- Licensing authority: FCC
- Facility ID: 92620
- Class: C3
- ERP: 2,200 watts
- HAAT: 336 meters (1,102 ft)
- Transmitter coordinates: 43°27′40″N 110°45′9″W
- Translator: 101.3 K267BV (Jackson)

Links
- Public license information: Public file; LMS
- Website: www.891khol.org

KHOL (89.1 FM) is a radio station licensed to Jackson, Wyoming, United States. Also known as Jackson Hole Community Radio, KHOL is the only community radio station in Wyoming. Its studios are located at the Center for the Arts.

== History ==
KHOL was more than a decade in the making before it went on the airwaves in 2008. The effort was spearheaded by Jim Tallichet, who also served as the station’s first executive director. After its founders purchased the construction permit from Broadcasting for the Challenged for $18,000 in 2007, KHOL was established in the basement of a barbershop in downtown Jackson from which it made its first broadcast in April 2008. The office space under Teton Barbershop was windowless. KHOL began as a mostly music-format station. After a few years in the barbershop basement, the station relocated to an office building near the Wort Hotel and then in 2012 to a studio in the Center for the Arts.

In 2019, Emily Cohen became executive director of KHOL after previous director Zach Zimmerman resigned. That year, the station became affiliated with the Rocky Mountain Radio Network. Cohen attended a conference that inspired her to expand KHOL's infrastructure and seek to affiliate the station with NPR. Just before the COVID-19 pandemic, KHOL received a donation from a private donor as well as a Meta Journalism Project grant from Meta Platforms (then known as Facebook). The network was one of two in Wyoming to receive a grant as part of the Meta Journalism Project.

During the COVID-19 pandemic lockdown in Jackson, Cohen reduced the station's active volunteer DJs to only two, with one in the morning and one in the afternoon. She hired Jack Catlin, who previously hosted a morning music show on KHOL, as music director. Kyle Mackie, previously at WBFO, was hired as news director, while field reporter Will Walkey was also hired. KHOL subsequently received a Community Service Grant from the Corporation for Public Broadcasting (CPB), expanding its overall budget by over 50 percent. After 13 years of operation, it met the CPB requirements for the first time as a result of the recent changes to its structure and operation. The station subsequently solicited feedback from the local community to determine future steps, including the possibility of NPR affiliation. KHOL also established affiliations with the Public Radio Exchange and Radio Bilingüe. As of July 29, 2020, the station had more than 40 volunteers.

On July 14, 2021, a planned power outage cut power to KHOL's radio tower at the top of Snow King Mountain, leased from American Tower. Lower Valley Energy did not notify either KHOL or American Tower of the planned outage. KHOL used its backup transmitter at the Center for the Arts building to broadcast while the tower was offline, after making repairs to the backup transmitter; the range of the transmitter reached Rafter J Ranch, Wyoming, less far than the station's broadcasts normally travel. The issue was resolved on July 15 after less than 24 hours.

== Activity ==
=== Reporting ===
KHOL focuses on reporting news from Teton County, Wyoming and Teton County, Idaho. It additionally reports from places as distant as Rawlins, Wyoming and Boise, Idaho.

=== Podcasting ===
KHOL creates various podcasts of shows from its newsroom, such as "Jackson Unpacked" and "Daily News Briefs". "Jackson Unpacked" includes reporting on locally relevant topics, with one episode having focused on opposition to the expansion of the Grand Targhee Mountain Resort. Spanish-language stories are also regularly included.

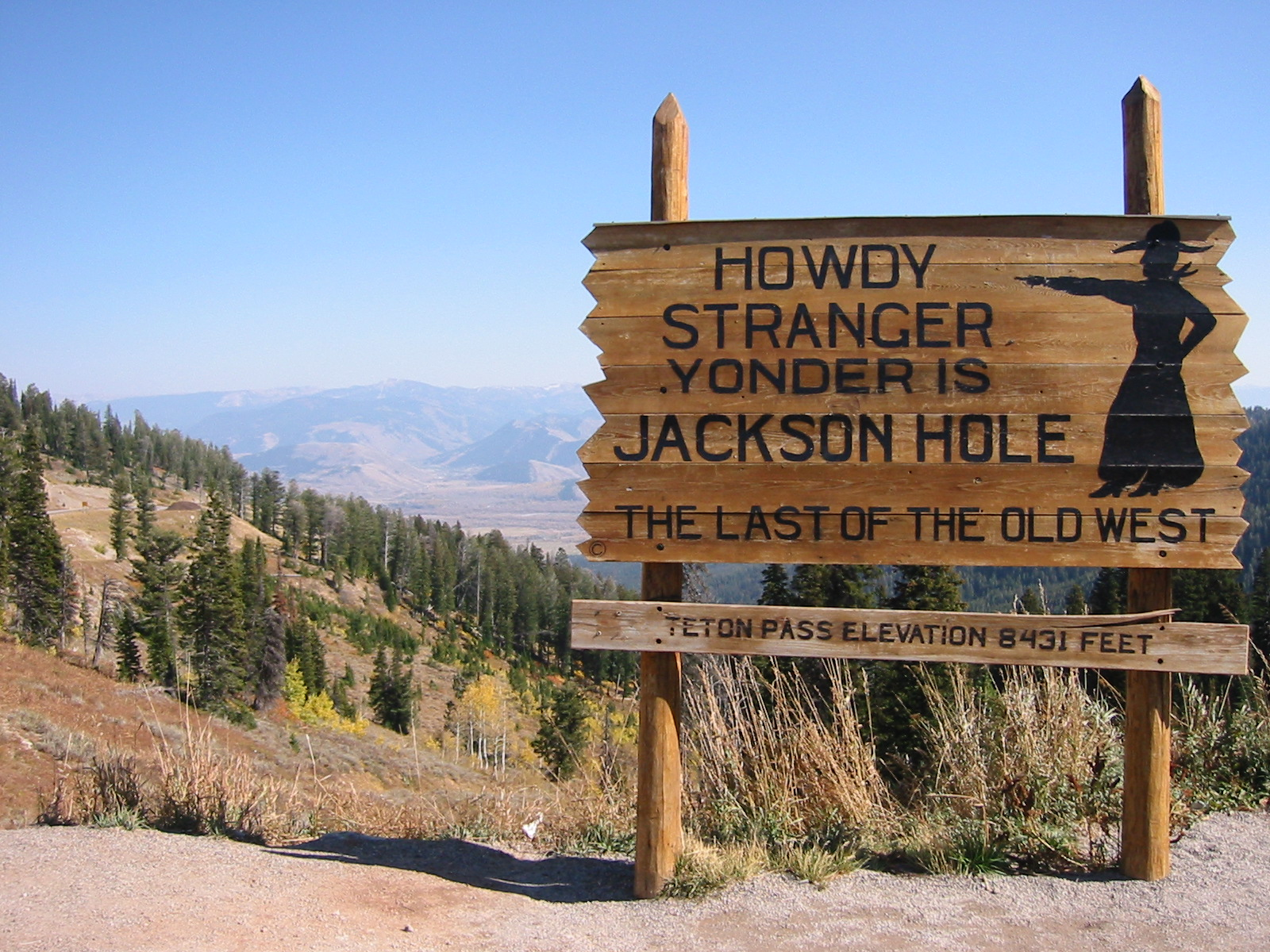
Sign visible on Teton Pass, commonly believed to say "Yonder Lies Jackson Hole"

In January 2020, KHOL partnered with the Northern Rockies Conservation Cooperative to begin the podcast "Yonder Lies", analyzing and debunking myths about Jackson Hole. Cohosted by Jesse Bryant and Hannah Habermann, the podcast was planned to discuss issues including wealth inequality in Jackson, the town's indigenous history, and the history of Grand Teton National Park. The name is a reference to a sign visible on Teton Pass when driving toward Jackson, which is commonly thought to say "yonder lies Jackson Hole"; the sign actually reads "yonder is Jackson Hole", making the podcast's name (according to Bryant) "a nod to the way that in Jackson Hole, we collectively just sort of believe whatever we want, regardless of whether it’s true or not".

== See also ==
- List of community radio stations in the United States
