= KHOI (FM) =

- Story City, Iowa; United States
- Broadcast area: Ames, Iowa
- Frequency: 89.1 MHz

Programming
- Format: Community radio
- Affiliations: Pacifica Radio

Ownership
- Owner: KHOI FM

History
- First air date: August 17, 2012
- Call sign meaning: "Heart Of Iowa"

Technical information
- Licensing authority: FCC
- Facility ID: 175288
- Class: A
- ERP: 2.75 kw
- HAAT: 77 meters (253 ft)
- Transmitter coordinates: 42°08′11″N 93°33′05″W

Links
- Public license information: Public file; LMS
- Webcast: Listen live
- Website: khoifm.org

KHOI (89.1 FM) is a community radio station licensed to Story City, Iowa. The station primarily broadcasts a mix of music, news and local public affairs programming. KHOI is affiliated with the Pacifica Radio network.

As a community station, all local programs are hosted by volunteers. The station's founder and manager is Ursula Ruedenberg, who oversees Pacifica's affiliate network of around 200 stations.

== See also ==
- List of community radio stations in the United States
