= WRIR-LP =

Radio station in Richmond, Virginia

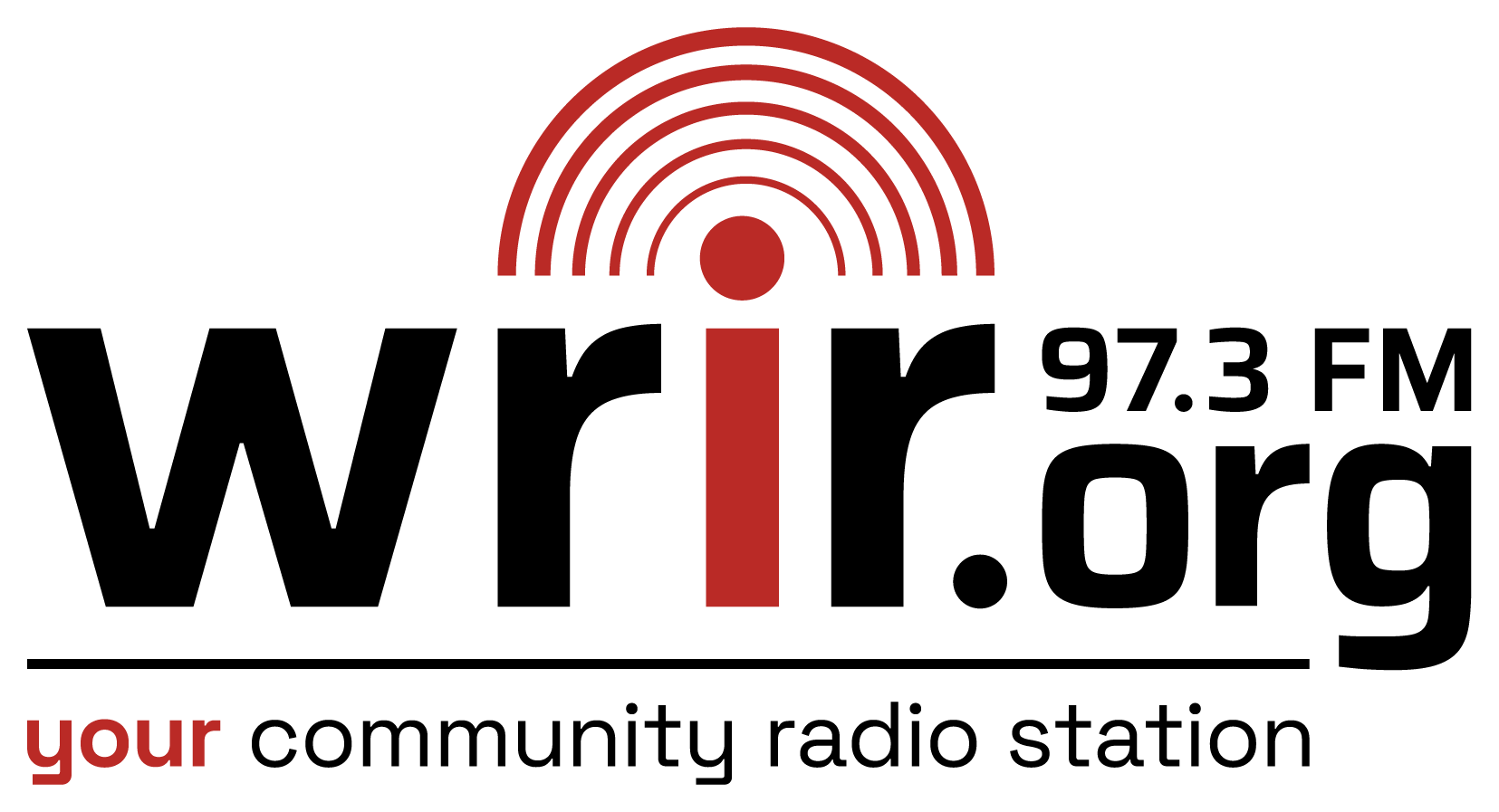
- Richmond, Virginia; United States
- Frequency: 97.3 MHz
- Branding: "Your community radio station"

Programming
- Language: English
- Format: Community radio; Adult Album Alternative
- Affiliations: Pacifica Radio Network

Ownership
- Owner: Virginia Center for Public Press

History
- First air date: January 1, 2005
- Call sign meaning: Richmond Independent Radio

Technical information
- Licensing authority: FCC
- Facility ID: 126872
- Class: L1
- ERP: 42 Watts
- HAAT: 45.5741 meters
- Transmitter coordinates: 37°33′13.0″N 77°26′8.0″W

Links
- Public license information: LMS
- Webcast: Listen live
- Website: www.wrir.org

WRIR-LP (97.3 FM, Richmond Independent Radio) is an independent, all volunteer, nonprofit community radio station licensed to Richmond, Virginia. It is the largest low power FM station of its kind in the United States. Owned and operated by the nonprofit Virginia Center for Public Press, it broadcasts a diverse schedule of locally produced music, public affairs, and talk programming that emphasizes underrepresented voices and local culture. In addition to its low-power FM signal, WRIR streams online, and is affiliated with Pacifica Radio. WRIR-LP began broadcasting on January 1, 2005.

== Growth and programming ==
Throughout the late 2000s and 2010s, WRIR expanded its volunteer base and programming schedule to include a wide array of music genres, locally produced talk shows, cultural affairs programs, and syndicated content. The station's volunteer DJs and hosts curate shows spanning styles such as jazz, hip hop, world music, punk, folk, and other genres that are underrepresented on commercial radio. Its schedule also includes locally produced public affairs and news programs as well as syndicated content such as Democracy Now! and other nationally distributed shows.

== The Rainbow Minute ==
The Rainbow Minute is a serial radio show created and produced by Judd Proctor and Brian Burns. An article called The Rainbow Minute from the website Diversity Richmond describes Proctor's inspiration for the show, "In February 2005, retired public school teacher Judd Proctor was out running errands, when he happened to tune in to "This Way Out," a gay and lesbian international news magazine." He, alongside his partner Brian Burns, who is a former art director, began underwriting This Way Out and their first airing was on February 16, 2005, with a dedication to Harvey Milk. They then moved on to create their own radio broadcast in Virginia called The Rainbow Minute. The official website for The Rainbow Minute WRIR.org describes the show: "The Rainbow Minute is a radio show about gay and lesbian heroes, history and culture." The two work as a team, with Judd doing the research and mixing, while Brian edits episodes and sets the music. Their first episode of The Rainbow Minute aired on September 25, 2006.

=== Diversity Richmond ===
Diversity Richmond is a voice and support system for the LGBTQ community that was founded in 1999. Diversity Richmond sponsors The Rainbow Minute. Like The Rainbow Minute, the Diversity Richmond is an organization that works for the equality of the LGBTQ community and gives people the opportunity to feel comfortable when around LGBTQ people, become involved in working for LGBTQ equality, and also become educated about the hardships LGBTQ people face daily and how we can make a difference. They hold numerous classes and discussion groups including a women's coming out support group. The Rainbow Minute and Diversity Richmond both hold volunteer opportunities. The Rainbow Minute allows volunteers to become a talk show hosts, all-nighter DJs, weekday board operators, for example. Diversity Richmond has volunteer opportunities like diversity bingo and diversity thrift to help raise money for their organization and to also get more people involved. Phylis Johnson, author of Radio Cultures: The Sound Medium in American Life, acknowledges that because of the Stonewall Rebellion, queer radio stations emerged across the United States with the help of volunteers (98). Volunteers make this organization and other radio station and media possible through their dedication and work.

==== LGBTQ Community at WRIR ====
Previously, there weren't many radio stations having to do with LGBTQ communities because not many people identified with being LGBTQ due to lack of knowledge as to what the term LGBTQ meant. The only terms people referred to were gay, lesbian, or straight. An article by Bonnie Morris describes the history of gay and lesbian people, "In the United States, few attempts to make advocacy groups supporting gay and lesbian relationships until after World War II, although prewar gay life flourished in urban centers such as Greenwich Village and Harlem during the Harlem Renaissance of the 1920s." Today, more and more radio stations and other forms of media are emerging that are geared specifically towards the LGBTQ community. Christopher Pullen and Margaret Cooper support this in their book "LGBTQ Identity and Online New Media" by describing the opportunities that online media give LGBTQ people to connect with each other, "Through online new media, LGBTQs offer person expressions of self, in the construction of public identity." In an article called "Romeo in love: a community format in a community radio," Tiziana Cavallo talks about the video cast Romeo in Love, which was created in 2008 by one heterosexual and one gay friend (281). Like The Rainbow Minute, it is a video cast about the lives of LGBTQ people. This video cast demonstrates the ways in which times have changed regarding associating with LGBTQ individuals and how people of different communities, such as heterosexual communities, racial communities, etc., are working together to create fairness and respect for everyone of the LGBTQ community. The Rainbow Minute and Diversity Richmond give people a place of comfort and safety that give them inspiration and hope for equality.

== The Means of Production ==
In 2025, WRIR produced The Means of Production, an audio documentary series tracing the station's origins, and its role in the broader low-power FM movement in Richmond, featuring interviews with long-time volunteers and community members.

== Studio location and community role ==
For nearly two decades, WRIR operated its studios at 1621 West Broad Street in Richmond, located above the music venue The Camel. The Broad Street studio served as a central hub for volunteers and became a focal point for community engagement, local broadcasting, and cultural programming.

=== Relocation to Shockoe Bottom ===
In 2025, WRIR announced plans to relocate its studios from its longtime home on West Broad Street, to a newly acquired facility in Richmond's historic Shockoe Bottom neighborhood.. The move was driven by the need for a more accessible and permanent space to support the station's volunteer operations and community programming. The new location was acquired as part of a capital campaign aimed at establishing an ADA-accessible, station-owned facility with upgraded studios and community space. According to the campaign materials, the relocation was intended to improve long-term sustainability and expand opportunities for public engagement with the station.

WRIR began broadcasting from the new Shockoe Bottom studio in January 2026, marking a new chapter in the station's history while continuing its mission as a volunteer-run community radio station serving Richmond and the surrounding region.

== See also ==
- List of community radio stations in the United States
