= WSPJ-LP =

Syracuse, New York; United States
- Broadcast area: Onondaga County
- Frequency: 103.3 MHz
- Branding: Spark!

Programming
- Format: Variety

Ownership
- Owner: Syracuse Community Radio, Inc.

History
- First air date: October 18, 2017

Technical information
- Licensing authority: FCC
- Facility ID: 197053
- Class: FL
- ERP: 100 watts
- HAAT: −10.0 meters (−32.8 ft)
- Transmitter coordinates: 43°07′9.00″N 76°13′32.00″W
- Repeater: 93.7 MHz

Links
- Public license information: LMS
- Website: Official website

WSPJ-LP is an FCC-licensed community non-commercial educational LPFM radio station in Syracuse, New York, owned by local non-profit group Syracuse Community Radio, Inc., (SCR) and branded as "Spark!". Syracuse Community Radio also operates translator W229CU on 93.7 FM to gain additional coverage. SCR reported that "103.3 FM started signal testing on Sunday, October 1, 2017 and 93.7 FM started signal testing later in the same week". Both were licensed by the FCC on October 18, 2017.

== Translator ==
In addition to the main station, WSPJ-LP is relayed by an additional translator to widen its broadcast area.

Call sign	Frequency	City of license	FID	ERP (W)	Class	FCC info
W229CU	93.7 FM	Syracuse, New York	154184	55	D	LMS

== See also ==
- List of community radio stations in the United States
