= KKRN =

- Bella Vista, California; United States
- Broadcast area: Round Mountain, California
- Frequency: 88.5 MHz

Programming
- Format: Community radio
- Affiliations: Pacifica radio

Ownership
- Owner: Acorn Community Enterprises

History
- First air date: May 12, 2008

Technical information
- Licensing authority: FCC
- Facility ID: 172603
- Class: C2
- ERP: 600 watts
- HAAT: 610 meters (2,001.312 feet)
- Transmitter coordinates: 40°54′23″N 121°49′39″W

Links
- Public license information: Public file; LMS
- Website: kkrn.org

KKRN is a community radio station licensed to Bella Vista, California. It serves Round Mountain, Burney, and Redding, California.

== History ==
KKRN began broadcasting on May 12, 2008.

== See also ==
- List of community radio stations in the United States
