= KPUP-LP =

- Patagonia, Arizona; United States
- Frequency: 100.5 MHz

Programming
- Format: Variety

Ownership
- Owner: Patagonia Community Radio, Inc.

Technical information
- Licensing authority: FCC
- Facility ID: 134483
- Class: L1
- ERP: 50 watts
- HAAT: -77 meters (-252 feet)
- Transmitter coordinates: 31°33′33″N 110°44′39″W

Links
- Public license information: LMS
- Website: http://www.kpup.info/

KPUP-LP (100.5 FM) is a low-power community radio station licensed to serve Patagonia, Arizona. The station is owned by Patagonia Community Radio, Inc.. It airs a Variety format.

The station was assigned the KPUP-LP call letters by the Federal Communications Commission on May 4, 2004.

== See also ==
- List of community radio stations in the United States
