= WVMO-LP =

Monona, Wisconsin; United States
- Broadcast area: Madison, Wisconsin
- Frequency: 98.7 MHz
- Branding: The Voice of Monona

Programming
- Format: Variety

Ownership
- Owner: City of Monona

History
- First air date: 2015
- Call sign meaning: W Voice of MOnona

Technical information
- Licensing authority: FCC
- Facility ID: 193317
- Class: L1
- ERP: 100 watts
- HAAT: 18.8 meters
- Transmitter coordinates: 43°03′48.80″N 89°20′22.20″W

Links
- Public license information: LMS
- Website: 98.7FM WVMO, The Voice of Monona

WVMO-LP (98.7 FM) is a community-owned radio station in the city of Monona, Wisconsin. The station, which went on air in 2015, broadcasts a variety format that includes local programming and Americana.

== See also ==
- List of community radio stations in the United States
