= KSKQ =

- Ashland, Oregon; United States
- Frequency: 89.5 MHz

Programming
- Language: English
- Format: Variety
- Affiliations: Pacifica radio

Ownership
- Owner: Multicultural Association of Southern Oregon

History
- First air date: November 2007
- Former frequencies: 94.9 Mhz

Technical information
- Licensing authority: FCC
- Facility ID: 173192
- Class: C2
- ERP: 560 watts
- HAAT: 596 meters (1,955 ft)
- Transmitter coordinates: 42°11′53″N 122°29′33″W
- Translator: 94.1 K231CW (Medford)

Links
- Public license information: Public file; LMS
- Webcast: Listen live
- Website: www.kskq.org

KSKQ (89.5 MHz) is a community radio station licensed to Ashland, Oregon. It is owned by the Multicultural Association of Southern Oregon (MCASO), as a non-commercial educational (NCE) station. Originally a low power (100 watt) LPFM station at 94.9 FM, it was upgraded to a full-power NCE station in June 2011. Its original transmitter site was just southeast of the city, and has since been dismantled in favor of a better site on Table Mountain.

== First FCC license ==
In December 2004, KSKQ received a Construction Permit (CP) and subsequent Low Power FM (LPFM) license, limited to 100 watts of transmitting power, and requiring 16 of every 24 hours of KSKQ programming to be locally produced. Volunteers who engage in the technical and broadcast part of their radio involvement, for the most part, are local, community participants of this project. The station represents a liberal, yet non-partisan, local community radio project, and encourages participation from many groups or individuals. KSKQ is also an affiliate of Pacifica Radio.

== New transmitter for KSKQ ==
In January 2010, the Mail Tribune of Medford, Oregon reported as required by FCC regulations, that KSKQ planned to increase its broadcasting signal to full power, which would allow coverage over the bulk of Jackson County, in addition to local home radio. The plan at the time was to have a full-power transmitter operational on Table Mountain by November 2010. KSKQ 94.9 FM, which is operated by the Multicultural Association of Southern Oregon in Ashland, was scheduled to transform into KORV 89.5 FM, broadcasting from the new transmitter. In April 2010, the KSKQ Advisory Committee decided to keep the KSKQ call letters for the full power station.

On Friday, June 24, 2011, KSKQ ceased broadcasting on its low-power frequency 94.9 FM. It is now broadcasting on the new frequency, 89.5 FM from a new transmitter on Table Mountain, east of Ashland. The station has been granted an FCC construction permit to increase ERP to 560 watts using a directional antenna. Upgrades are underway to boost the power and quality of the signal being transmitted by KSKQ in the near future.

After the new directional antenna was secured on top of a fire lookout, on Table Mountain, in late November 2013, the transmitter was finally ready to be turned on at just under 100 watts ERP, as of January 4, 2014.

== Issues with power generation for the transmitter ==
On November 14, 2011, a power outage was experienced by the transmitter on Table Mountain. This caused an interruption of broadcasting over the airwaves for two days, although the internet stream continued as before. New snowfall had made the road nearly impassable for the delivery truck to refill the propane tank connected to the generator, which was the only source of power to the transmitter. This incident reinforced the need for an alternate source of power. An official request had already been submitted months before to U.S. Cellular, for permission to connect to a transformer owned by that wireless telecommunications firm on the same site. An agreement was eventually reached and the transmitter is now fully powered by the electric grid.

On the day following the outage, two truck drivers from Ferrellgas of Central Point were finally able to deliver the propane to KSKQ's 200-gallon tank on the mountain. A dialogue was initiated with U.S. Cellular to resolve the impasse over the sharing of power, and the problems with propane refueling only underscored the urgency of these talks. KSKQ's license with the Federal Communications Commission requires that it remain on air, barring unforeseen circumstances. If power had not been restored so quickly, the station would have had to apply for a 30-day reprieve to allow for restoration of power.

During the tragic Almeda wildfire of 2020, KSKQ again lost its electrical power. Because of its recent move to a new location, KSKQ had no back-up generator to power equipment in the studio or to allow the EAS system to operate. That problem is in the process to be corrected to comply with FCC regulations for emergency electrical power.

== See also ==
- List of community radio stations in the United States
