= KZAS-LP =

- Hood River, Oregon; United States
- Frequency: 95.1 MHz
- Branding: Radio Tierra

Programming
- Format: Spanish Community

Ownership
- Owner: Radio Tierra

Technical information
- Licensing authority: FCC
- Facility ID: 133172
- Class: L1
- ERP: 100 watts
- HAAT: -77.8 meters (-254 feet)
- Transmitter coordinates: 45°42′16″N 121°31′24″W

Links
- Public license information: LMS
- Webcast: radiotierra.org

KZAS-LP (95.1 FM, "Radio Tierra") is a low-power FM radio station licensed to serve Hood River, Oregon, United States. The station is owned by Radio Tierra .

The station was assigned the KZAS-LP call sign by the Federal Communications Commission on March 8, 2003.

== Programming ==
KZAS-LP station airs a Spanish-language community radio format. "Radio Tierra" features a mix of music, news, and locally produced community interest programming.

== Translators ==
KZAS-LP programming is also carried on multiple broadcast translator stations to extend or improve the coverage area of the station.

Call sign	Frequency	City of license	FID	ERP (W)	Class	FCC info
K299BB	(107.7 FM) FM	The Dalles, OR	149165	125	D	LMS
K240DA	(95.9 FM) FM	Stevenson, WA	152925	90	D	LMS
K244ES	(96.7 FM) FM	Carson, WA	148275	7.5	D	LMS
K296GO	(107.1 FM) FM	Parkdale, OR	147735	140	D	LMS

== See also ==
- List of community radio stations in the United States
