= KCEI =

Radio station in Red River–Taos, New Mexico

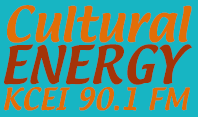
- Red River, New Mexico; United States
- Broadcast area: Taos, New Mexico
- Frequency: 90.1 MHz
- Branding: Cultural Energy

Programming
- Language: English
- Format: Variety
- Affiliations: Pacifica Radio Network

Ownership
- Owner: Cultural Energy
- Sister stations: KCEI-LD, KCEY-FM

History
- First air date: 1997
- Former call signs: KRDR (1997–2012); KCEY (2012)
- Call sign meaning: Cultural Energy Independent Radio

Technical information
- Licensing authority: FCC
- Facility ID: 82299
- Class: C1
- ERP: 2,050 watts
- HAAT: 739 meters (2,425 ft)
- Transmitter coordinates: 36°51′34″N 106°01′02″W

Links
- Public license information: Public file; LMS
- Webcast: Listen live
- Website: culturalenergy.org

KCEI (90.1 MHz) is an American radio station licensed to serve the community of Red River, New Mexico. The station's broadcast license is held by Cultural Energy. KCEI also serves Taos, New Mexico, via a booster station (KCEI-FM1) located in the suburb of El Prado.

KCEI broadcasts a variety radio format to northern New Mexico and southern Colorado.

The station was assigned the call sign "KCEI" by the Federal Communications Commission (FCC) on May 1, 2012. It held the call sign "KRDR" from January 14, 1997, through April 4, 2012. From April 4 to May 1, 2012, the station was licensed as "KCEY".

== Booster ==
KCEI programming is also carried on a booster station to extend or improve the coverage area of the station.

| Call sign | Frequency | City of license | FID | ERP (W) | Class | FCC info |
|---|---|---|---|---|---|---|
| KCEI-FM1 | (90.1 FM) FM | El Prado, New Mexico | | 390 vertical | D | |

== See also ==
- List of community radio stations in the United States
