= KDUP =

- Cedarville, California; United States
- Broadcast area: Surprise Valley
- Frequency: 88.1 MHz

Programming
- Format: Community radio

Ownership
- Owner: Surprise Valley Culture and Arts

History
- First air date: 2008

Technical information
- Licensing authority: FCC
- Facility ID: 172273
- Class: A
- ERP: 270 watts
- HAAT: −32.0 meters (−105.0 ft)
- Transmitter coordinates: 41°38′13″N 120°05′28″W

Links
- Public license information: Public file; LMS
- Webcast: Listen live
- Website: kdup.org

KDUP (88.1 FM) is a radio station licensed to Cedarville, California, United States. The station is owned by Surprise Valley Culture and Arts.

== See also ==
- List of community radio stations in the United States
