= WSFM-LP =

- Asheville, North Carolina; United States
- Broadcast area: Asheville, North Carolina
- Frequency: 103.3 MHz
- Branding: 103.3 Asheville FM

Programming
- Format: Freeform

Ownership
- Owner: Friends of Community Radio Inc.

History
- First air date: May 18, 2015; 10 years ago

Technical information
- Licensing authority: FCC
- Facility ID: 195466
- Class: L1
- ERP: 100 watts
- HAAT: 1.4 meters (4 ft 7 in)
- Transmitter coordinates: 35°35′48″N 82°33′31″W

Links
- Public license information: LMS
- Webcast: Listen live
- Website: www.ashevillefm.org

WSFM-LP, known as 103.3 Asheville FM, is a low-power community radio station licensed to Asheville, North Carolina that began broadcasting over the air on May 18, 2015.

== About ==
Asheville FM is a nonprofit, freeform radio station run primarily by volunteers and focused on featuring locally created content that is reflective of and centered around the Asheville area and western North Carolina in general. The station currently has 60 shows, all hosted by locals, in addition to Democracy Now!

Except for a general manager, a volunteer coordinator and one employee who works on commission to sell underwriting, the station is staffed entirely by volunteers. The station's funding sources include underwriting sales, semi-annual onair membership drives, and general donations.

== Programming ==
Asheville FM offers a variety of programming, including music shows, talk shows (including a local news show), and two Spanish-language shows.

Musical genres represented on the station's music shows include rock, soul, R&B, funk, disco, progressive rock, classic country, hip hop, blues, and children's music.

Talk shows topics include health, local news, the local food scene, and sports.

Due to the station's freeform programming, there are programs that mix talk and music.

Shows in both English and Spanish are aired on a regular basis.

== History ==
Asheville FM began in 2009 as an online radio station. The passage of the Low-Power Community Radio Act of 2010 provided Asheville FM an opportunity to move to a broadcast frequency. From a 20-foot tower on top of the Hotel Indigo in downtown Asheville, Asheville FM's signal reaches a 5- to 10-mile radius, though reception in some areas depends on the local terrain.

The station's first general manager, K.P. Whaley, began in January 2017 and Annelise Kopp stepped into the role in June of 2025.

== See also ==
- List of community radio stations in the United States
