= KDPT-LP =

- Dos Palos, California; United States
- Broadcast area: Dos Palos, California
- Frequency: 102.9 MHz
- Branding: Bronco Radio

Programming
- Format: Community radio

Ownership
- Owner: Dos Palos Radio

Technical information
- Licensing authority: FCC
- Facility ID: 123601
- Class: L1
- ERP: 100 watts
- HAAT: 26 meters (85 ft)
- Transmitter coordinates: 36°58′57″N 120°38′19″W

Links
- Public license information: LMS
- Webcast: Listen live
- Website: https://broncoradio.wordpress.com

KDPT-LP (102.9 FM) is a low-power community radio station licensed to Dos Palos, California, United States.

== See also ==
- List of community radio stations in the United States
