= WPPP-LP =

- Athens, Georgia; United States
- Broadcast area: Athens, Georgia
- Frequency: 100.7 MHz

Programming
- Format: community radio
- Affiliations: Pacifica Radio Network

Ownership
- Owner: Athens Community Radio Foundation, Inc.; (The Web Rights Association)

History
- Call sign meaning: "Passion Power Pleasure"

Technical information
- Licensing authority: FCC
- Facility ID: 124235
- Class: L1
- ERP: 100 watts
- HAAT: 26 meters
- Transmitter coordinates: 33°56′21.4″N 83°22′46.5″W

Links
- Public license information: LMS
- Website: www.undergroundathens.com

WPPP-LP (100.7 MHz) is a non-commercial low power FM radio station in Athens, Georgia. Owned by the non-profit Athens Community Radio Foundation, Inc., the station reaches listeners within a 15-mile radius of its studios near the University of Georgia campus. WPPP's programming includes alternative and progressive rock, as well as "news reports and progressive political commentary produced free of corporate interests and government influence." The station is affiliated with the Pacifica Radio network.

== Station history ==
A group led by Xavier Elkins applied for a broadcast license after the Federal Communications Commission opened a filing window for LPFM licenses in 2000. The station went on the air in August 2004. Known for a wildly varying assortment of music, the station was cited by the Athens Banner-Herald as "the only radio station in the area that will play Pat Benatar right after a Drive-By Truckers song following a jazz lick - and all without commercial interruption." Elkins and co-host Jon Bird host a talk show called "The Daily Hangover Chronicles."

== Community affiliation ==
WPPP-LP is an affiliate of Common Ground Athens, a resource center offering meeting space, training programs, and management support to Athens community organizations.

== See also ==
- List of community radio stations in the United States
