= WOMM-LP =

Community radio station in Burlington, Vermont, United States

Burlington, Vermont; United States
- Frequency: 105.9 MHz
- Branding: The Radiator

Programming
- Format: Variety

Ownership
- Owner: The Big Heavy World Foundation, Inc.

History
- First air date: September 22, 2007
- Last air date: 2024

Technical information
- Facility ID: 135702
- Class: L1
- ERP: 100 watts
- HAAT: 15 meters (49 ft)
- Transmitter coordinates: 44°28′44″N 73°12′50.3″W

WOMM-LP (105.9 FM) was a federally licensed, low-power, non-commercial community radio station based in Burlington, Vermont. WOMM featured a variety of formatted shows driven by the on-air personalities who staff the station. It used the slogan "The Radiator, Burlington's community radio station broadcasting with 100 watts of fury."

WOMM had a 100-watt mono signal and broadcast within Chittenden County, Vermont. The station was conceived in the early 2000s by Lee Anderson and Jim Lockridge of Vermont music agency Big Heavy World and signed on September 22, 2007. There were more than 70 volunteers on the staff by 2010. In 2014, Big Heavy World's offices and WOMM-LP relocated to space at Burlington College. The station's license was cancelled on June 20, 2024.

== Programming ==
The format of WOMM was variety and featured a daily programming schedule which may range from heavy rock and punk to classical and talk, depending on the personalities currently on the station.

== See also ==
- List of community radio stations in the United States
