= WRGY =

- Rangeley, Maine; United States
- Frequency: 90.5 MHz

Programming
- Format: Educational

Ownership
- Owner: Tranet

History
- First air date: September 2010
- Call sign meaning: W RanGeleY

Technical information
- Licensing authority: FCC
- Facility ID: 172799
- Class: A
- ERP: 90 watts
- HAAT: 645.0 meters (2,116.1 ft)
- Transmitter coordinates: 44°56′6″N 70°30′35″W

Links
- Public license information: Public file; LMS
- Website: Official website

WRGY (90.5 FM) is a radio station licensed to Rangeley, Maine, United States. The station is currently owned by Tranet, a non-profit organization operated by David McMillan. The station has studios on Main Street in Rangeley with transmitter atop Saddleback Mountain.

== See also ==
- List of community radio stations in the United States
