= WVEW-LP =

- Brattleboro, Vermont; United States
- Frequency: 107.7 MHz

Programming
- Format: Community radio

Ownership
- Owner: Vermont Earth Works

History
- First air date: September 1, 2006
- Call sign meaning: Vermont Earth Works (license holders)

Technical information
- Licensing authority: FCC
- Facility ID: 134542
- Class: L1
- ERP: 100 watts
- HAAT: −82 meters (−269 ft)
- Transmitter coordinates: 42°51′9″N 72°33′33″W

Links
- Public license information: LMS
- Webcast: Listen live
- Website: www.wvew.org

WVEW-LP (107.7 FM) is a radio station licensed to Brattleboro, Vermont. The license to operate the station is held by Vermont Earth Works. The broadcast radius is from 3 to 5 miles (4.8 to 8.0 km). There are 56 volunteers on the staff.

== History ==
In July 1998, a group of local citizens began broadcasting at less than one watt of power. Over the next 7 years that station, known as Radio Free Brattleboro (RFB), grew to 10 watts of power and became an important resource for its community. RFB was licensed to broadcast by its community - but not by the Federal Communications Commission (FCC). Vermont Earth Works is a 501(c)3 educational non-profit organization. It filed for one of the new 100 watt Low Power FM licenses during a five-day window in June 2001.

Former logo

On March 3, 2005, Vermont Earth Works was granted a permit to construct a 100 watt LPFM radio station to serve the Brattleboro community. After years of patient waiting, a chance had finally been given to provide Brattleboro with its own licensed, non-commercial, independent, community access radio station. Over the next year and a half, station volunteers held meetings and created committee and governance structures. Work on the studio space began. Equipment was ordered and installed. A year and a half later on August 25, 2006, WVEW began testing its broadcast signal.

On August 29, the FCC changed WVEW's construction permit into a license; on September 1, 2006, at 5 pm, the station had its official broadcast debut.

A fire at the historic Brooks House in Brattleboro on April 18, 2011, destroyed the station's studios and transmitter, forcing the station off the air. Broadcasts resumed from WVEW-LP's new studios in the historic Hooker-Dunham building on April 10, 2012.

== See also ==
- List of community radio stations in the United States
