= KPFZ-FM =

Coordinates: 38.990°N 122.769°W

- Lakeport, California; United States
- Broadcast area: Lakeport, California
- Frequency: 88.1 FM

Programming
- Format: Community radio

Ownership
- Owner: Lake County Community Radio Inc.

Technical information
- Licensing authority: FCC
- Facility ID: 90952
- Class: A
- ERP: 300 watts
- HAAT: 655 meters

Links
- Public license information: Public file; LMS
- Webcast: Stream; Streamed via Surfer Network.
- Website: KPFZ.org

KPFZ-FM is an FM radio station that broadcasts a community radio format to Lake County, California.

KPFZ's staff, including board members, programmers, and hosts are volunteers.

== History ==
KPFZ began as a pirate radio station in Lucerne in 1996, broadcasting in a limited fashion (weekends, and evenings mostly). In 1997–1998, the pirate station applied for a full power broadcasting license.

In 2000, and while volunteers awaited the U.S. Federal Communications Commission's (FCC) decision regarding the pirate's full power license application, the station applied for a low power license. Through grass root efforts, the pirate station was granted an FCC low-power license in 2001. At that time the call letters KPFZ were implemented. The inspiration for these call letters came from Pacifica Radio network's listener-supported stations such as KPFA. The station began broadcasting as KPFZ 104.5LP-FM, and was the first station in California's radio history to be licensed as such (LP-FM).

On April 25, 2005, a construction permit was issued for the broadcasting of KPFZ 88.1fm 'full-power' (100 watts, or more, of signal strength). This effectively ended the stations low-power broadcast as preparing for the larger broadcasting signal and paying for the continuance of the low-power station proved to be too costly. By mid 2006-early 2007 KPFZ began broadcasting as full power KPFZ 88.1fm "Real Radio for Lake County, CA and Beyond."

In 2014 KPFZ had four committees (from web-development to fundraising), and more than nine titled volunteer staff positions. KPFZ has experienced growth as a grass-roots community media outlet since its inception in 1996.

== Programming ==
The founders, and volunteers of KPFZ and their collective dream of a full power localized media outlet, concentrating on issues affecting Lake County residents, giving a voice to minorities in the county, and commercial free music had been realized.

KPFZ music programs include Linda Gubert's "Denim Alley," "Boogie Sessions" hosted by local resident Brent Bomia, "Reggae Spirit" hosted by local citizen Tee Watts, "Raptured Disc" hosted by L.C. resident Roberto Lozano, "Eclectic Echoes" hosted by local retired jr. high school principal Tim Hoff.

Talk shows include "Karma Cola", hosted by one of KPFZ's founding members and current station manager Andy Weiss, "The Voice of White Plume" hosted by Native American/Lake County, CA Pomo native tribesmen Clayton Duncan, "The Law Show" (formerly: 'Im Not a Lawyer, but I Play One on the Radio') hosted by local paralegal Herb Gura, "Savings and Trust" hosted by longtime local resident Debbie Bielenberg, and "The Taira St. John Show" hosted by Taira St. John.

These programs have been broadcasting on KPFZ since its pirate and/or low power radio days.

== See also ==
- List of community radio stations in the United States
