= WEES-LP =

- Ocean City, Maryland; United States
- Frequency: 107.9 MHz

Programming
- Format: Variety Oldies

Ownership
- Owner: Edinboro Early School Inc.

History
- Call sign meaning: Edinboro Early School

Technical information
- Licensing authority: FCC
- Class: L1
- ERP: 15 watts
- HAAT: 75.3 meters (247 feet)
- Transmitter coordinates: 38°24′59″N 75°03′24″W

Links
- Public license information: LMS
- Website: http://www.wees.org/

WEES-LP (107.9 FM) is a non-commercial radio station licensed to serve Ocean City, Maryland. The station is owned by Edinboro Early School Inc. It airs a Variety format featuring educational programs, oldies music, community affairs programs, and other locally produced programs. WEES-LP maintains a public studio in the Gold Coast Mall on the Coastal Highway in Ocean City.

The station was assigned the WEES-LP call letters by the Federal Communications Commission on April 25, 2001.

== See also ==
- List of community radio stations in the United States
