= KRFC =

Community radio station in Fort Collins, Colorado

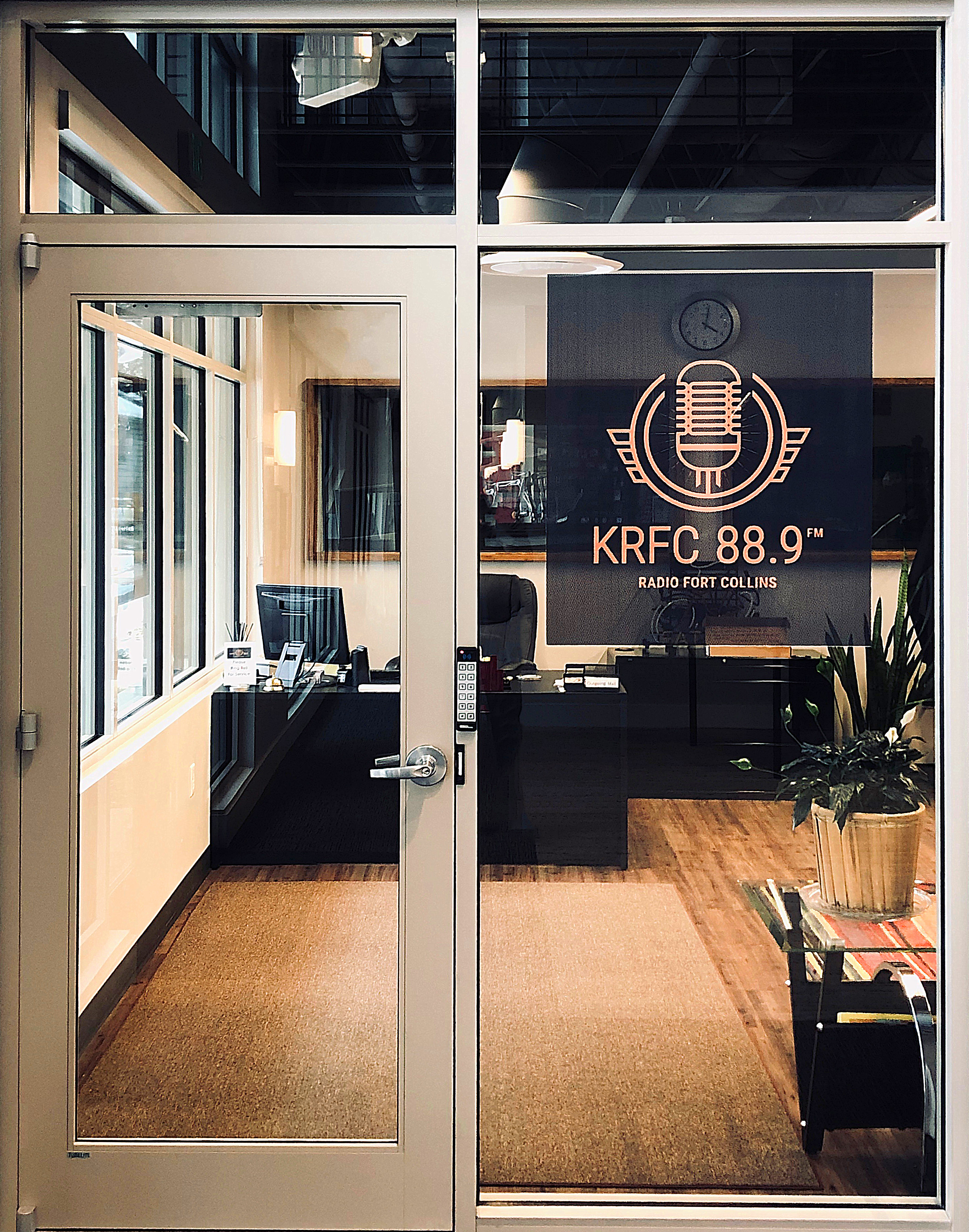
- Fort Collins, Colorado; United States
- Broadcast area: North Central Colorado
- Frequency: 88.9 MHz (HD Radio)
- Branding: KRFC 88.9 FM Radio Fort Collins

Programming
- Format: Community radio

Ownership
- Owner: Public Radio for The Front Range

History
- First air date: March 1, 2003
- Call sign meaning: Radio Fort Collins

Technical information
- Licensing authority: FCC
- Facility ID: 82804
- Class: C2
- ERP: 50,000 watts
- HAAT: 54 meters (177 ft)
- Transmitter coordinates: 40°34′53″N 104°54′20″W

Links
- Public license information: Public file; LMS
- Webcast: Listen Live
- Website: krfcfm.org

KRFC (88.9 FM) is a community-based radio station in Fort Collins, Colorado. The station is owned and operated by Public Radio for the Front Range. The station's programming includes music of numerous genres, played by volunteer DJs. Some news, information and syndicated shows are on the schedule as well. Although similar in funding strategies to a traditional public radio station, KRFC is not a member of any of the major networks such as NPR or Pacifica.

KRFC has an effective radiated power (ERP) of 50,000 watts, with a signal extending from the Wyoming border to the suburbs of Denver. The transmitter is on Weld County Route 80 near Route 17 in Severance, Colorado.

== History ==
Public Radio for the Front Range (PRFR) was started by a group of former DJs from KCSU-FM. DJs who were not current students were forced to leave after KCSU-FM's underwriter, Colorado State University, decided to make KCSU-FM solely student-run. In September 1995, PRFR was given IRS 501(C)(3) non-profit status.

By the summer of 1996, PRFR had applied for a construction permit from the Federal Communications Commission (FCC). The group wanted to build a station on 88.9 MHz, but were challenged by other broadcasting groups. PRFR then went into negotiations during 1997 with Colorado Christian University to share 88.9 MHz; these negotiations failed.

By 2000, the group applied for the 89.7 MHz frequency in a low-power jurisdiction; another Christian group applied for the same frequency. After successful negotiations, PRFR came into agreement with the other applicants that the PRFR would receive 88.9 MHz. The agreement was submitted to the FCC on July 7, 2002, who then granted PRFR a construction permit for a 3,000–watt non-commercial radio station. KRFC 88.9 FM Radio Fort Collins began broadcasting on March 1, 2003.

In 2004, KFRC completed the construction and expansion of its studios. Its facilities include three separate studios, all of which have the ability to broadcast live. Volunteers continue to make up the majority of KRFC 88.9 FM Radio Fort Collins' workforce. In 2022, the station increased its power to 50,000 watts and constructed its own antenna tower. This gives it a larger area of Colorado able to receive its signal.

== See also ==
- List of community radio stations in the United States
