= KKDS-LP =

- Eureka, California; United States
- Broadcast area: Eureka, California
- Frequency: 97.7 MHz

Programming
- Format: Variety

Ownership
- Owner: Dell' Arte, Inc.

Technical information
- Licensing authority: FCC
- Facility ID: 124327
- Class: L1
- ERP: 100 watts
- HAAT: −28 meters (−92 ft)
- Transmitter coordinates: 40°48′29″N 124°8′45″W

Links
- Public license information: LMS
- Website: blueoxradio.org

KKDS-LP (97.7 FM) is a low-power community radio station broadcasting to the Eureka, California area. The station is currently owned by Dell' Arte, Inc.

== See also ==
- List of community radio stations in the United States
