= KSAP-LP =

Coordinates: 29.907°N 93.924°W

- Port Arthur, Texas; United States
- Broadcast area: Golden Triangle
- Frequency: 96.9 MHz
- Branding: "The Breeze"

Programming
- Format: Talk and Community Information

Ownership
- Owner: Truth and Education Corporation

History
- First air date: 2005 (21 years ago)
- Former frequencies: 107.1 MHz (2005–2012)

Technical information
- Licensing authority: FCC
- Facility ID: 133414
- Class: L1
- ERP: 100 watts
- HAAT: 14.449 meters (47.40 ft)

Links
- Public license information: LMS
- Website: KSAP FM-The Breeze

KSAP-LP, "The Breeze", is a radio station in Port Arthur, Texas that broadcasts a talk and community information format, with a local approach that is free of political and corporate influences. The low-power FM outlet is owned and operated by Truth and Education Corporation.

== See also ==
- List of community radio stations in the United States
