= WXGR-LP =

Radio station in Dover, New Hampshire

- Dover, New Hampshire; United States
- Broadcast area: Seacoast Region
- Frequency: 103.5 MHz

Programming
- Format: Eclectic

Ownership
- Owner: Seacoast Community Radio

History
- First air date: 2003
- Former frequencies: 101.5 MHz (2003–2013)

Technical information
- Licensing authority: FCC
- Facility ID: 126947
- Class: L1
- ERP: 13 watts
- HAAT: 81.1 meters (266 ft)
- Transmitter coordinates: 43°10′27″N 70°46′47″W

Links
- Public license information: LMS
- Webcast: Listen Live
- Website: wxgr.org

WXGR-LP (103.5 FM) is a non-profit low-power FM radio station licensed to serve Dover, New Hampshire. The station is operated by Seacoast Community Radio, which acquired the broadcasting license in September 2019.

The station was assigned the WXGR call letters by the Federal Communications Commission on July 31, 2003. The station broadcasts from its tower site in Eliot, Maine, with an office and studio in Portsmouth, New Hampshire. WXGR serves the Seacoast area of New Hampshire and southern Maine.

== Programming ==
WXGR-LP airs an eclectic format that includes a variety of musical styles from all over the world.

== See also ==
- List of community radio stations in the United States
