= KNIZ =

Gallup, New Mexico; United States
- Frequency: 90.1 MHz
- Branding: KNIZ 90.1

Programming
- Format: Variety
- Affiliations: Pacifica Radio

Ownership
- Owner: The Ojo Caliente Restoration Society

History
- First air date: 2009
- Call sign meaning: "Nizhoni"; (Navajo word meaning "beautiful")

Technical information
- Licensing authority: FCC
- Facility ID: 174368
- Class: A
- ERP: 800 watts
- HAAT: -8 meters (-25 feet)
- Transmitter coordinates: 35°31′6″N 108°43′49″W

Links
- Public license information: Public file; LMS
- Website: knizradio.org

KNIZ (90.1 FM) is a variety formatted radio station in Gallup, New Mexico.

The station's programming includes music programs of various formats, including classical, jazz, Native American music, along with progressive news programming from Pacifica Radio.

The station was assigned the KNIZ call letters by the Federal Communications Commission on July 14, 2009.

== See also ==
- List of community radio stations in the United States
