= KMUZ =

Community radio station in Turner–Salem, Oregon

- Turner, Oregon; United States
- Broadcast area: Salem, Oregon
- Frequency: 88.5 MHz

Programming
- Language: English
- Format: Community

Ownership
- Owner: Willamette Information, News, and Entertainment Service

History
- First air date: 2011

Technical information
- Licensing authority: FCC
- Facility ID: 172599
- Class: A
- ERP: 32 watts
- HAAT: 242 meters (794 ft)
- Transmitter coordinates: 44°47′00″N 122°59′44″W
- Translator: 100.7 K264AA (Salem)

Links
- Public license information: Public file; LMS
- Webcast: Listen Live
- Website: kmuz.org

KMUZ (88.5 FM) is an American non-commercial educational radio station licensed to serve the community of Turner, Oregon. The station's broadcast license is held by the Willamette Information, News, and Entertainment Service.

KMUZ broadcasts a community radio format to the greater Salem, Oregon, area.

== History ==
In October 2007, Salem Folklore Community applied to the U.S. Federal Communications Commission (FCC) for a construction permit for a new broadcast radio station. The FCC granted this permit on August 12, 2008, with a scheduled expiration date of August 12, 2011. The new station was assigned call sign "KMUZ" on September 23, 2008.

Former logo

In May 2011, Salem Folklore Community entered into an agreement to transfer the assets and permit for KMUZ the Willamette Information News & Entertainment Service in return for $1. The FCC approved the sale on July 7, 2011, and the transaction was completed on July 15, 2011. After construction and testing were completed in August 2011, the station was granted its broadcast license on August 23, 2011.

On September 5, 2011, the station fell silent while officials from Marion County, Oregon, reviewed the building permit and zoning variance for the station's transmitter facilities. The station used this downtime to slightly modify its broadcast antenna and signal coverage area. On December 20, 2011, the FCC granted the KMUZ special temporary authority to remain silent. This authorization was scheduled to expire on June 17, 2012.

Operating under program test authority, KMUZ returned to the air full-time on December 17, 2011.

On January 24, 2015 at 10am KMUZ began simulcasting on translator K264AA 100.7 FM in Salem.

KMUZ also airs programming from OPB Music (KOPB-HD2 in Portland) during overnight hours.

== See also ==
- List of community radio stations in the United States
