= KWMR =

Community radio station in Point Reyes Station, California

- Point Reyes Station, California; United States
- Frequency: 90.5 MHz

Programming
- Format: Community radio

Ownership
- Owner: KWMR Inc

History
- Former call signs: KBJH
- Call sign meaning: West Marin

Technical information
- Licensing authority: FCC
- Facility ID: 89129
- Class: A
- ERP: 320 watts (horiz.); 310 watts (vert.)
- HAAT: 328 meters (1,076 ft)
- Transmitter coordinates: 38°4′48″N 122°51′57″W

Links
- Public license information: Public file; LMS
- Webcast: Listen live
- Website: kwmr.org

KWMR (90.5 FM) is a community radio station licensed to Point Reyes Station, California, United States. It also broadcasts from Bolinas, California, and Lagunitas, California, with two translators.

== Translators ==
Call sign	Frequency	City of license	FID	ERP (W)	Class	FCC info
K210EH	89.9 FM	Bolinas, California	93568	10	D	LMS
K222CO	92.3 FM	Lagunitas, California	146312	10	D	LMS

== See also ==
- List of community radio stations in the United States
