= WDRT =

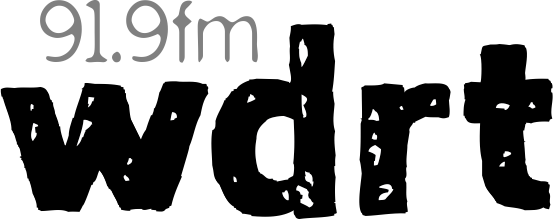
- Viroqua, Wisconsin; United States
- Broadcast area: Driftless Region-La Crosse, Wisconsin
- Frequency: 91.9 MHz

Programming
- Language: Multilingual
- Format: Community
- Affiliations: NFCB, Pacifica Radio

Ownership
- Owner: Driftless Community Radio, Inc.

History
- First air date: September 17, 2010
- Call sign meaning: driftless, dirt, grounded

Technical information
- Licensing authority: FCC
- Facility ID: 171832
- Class: A
- ERP: 3000 watts
- HAAT: 132.5 meters
- Transmitter coordinates: 43°36′28″N 90°53′24″W

Links
- Public license information: Public file; LMS
- Webcast: Listen Live
- Website: wdrt.org

WDRT (91.9 FM “Driftless Community Radio”) is a radio station that broadcasts a community radio format. Licensed to Viroqua, Wisconsin, United States, it serves the Driftless Region in Southwest Wisconsin. WDRT first began broadcasting in 2010. The station is currently owned by Driftless Community Radio Inc.

== History ==
WDRT started as Radio Driftless.org an Internet audio stream on June 30, 2005, while Driftless Community Radio, Inc. (DCR) was waiting for the US FCC to accept applications for new non-commercial radio stations. radiodriftless.org (now defunct) streamed audio, both live and pre-recorded for four years.

After negotiating a buyout with a competitive license application in Sparta, Wisconsin, DCR was granted a construction permit by the FCC on March 24, 2009. Per FCC rules, DCR had three years to complete the construction of the station.

In September 2009 DCR leased a 1,400-square-foot space on Viroqua's Main Street for its studios, and commenced studio construction.

A year later on September 17, 2010, WDRT began broadcasting on its assigned frequency, 91.9 MHz and has broadcast (more or less) continuously since then.

In 2022, WDRT increased its effective radiatedower to 3,000 watts.

== See also ==
- List of community radio stations in the United States
- Coverage Area for WDRT 91.9 FM, Viroqua, WI
