= KGUD =

Community radio station in Longmont, Colorado

- Longmont, Colorado; United States
- Broadcast area: Fort Lupton, Colorado
- Frequency: 90.7 MHz

Programming
- Format: Easy Listening/Adult Standards

Ownership
- Owner: Longmont Community Radio

History
- First air date: September 1975
- Former call signs: KCDC (1975 to 2004)
- Call sign meaning: "Good"

Technical information
- Licensing authority: FCC
- Facility ID: 62178
- Class: A
- ERP: 920 watts
- HAAT: 82 meters (269 ft)
- Transmitter coordinates: 40°14′24″N 105°3′19″W

Links
- Public license information: Public file; LMS
- Website: kgud.org

KGUD (90.7 MHz) is a non-commercial, non-profit FM radio station licensed to Longmont, Colorado. The station is owned and operated by Longmont Community Radio. It airs an easy listening/adult standards radio format, supported by listener donations.

== History ==
The station began operating in September 1975 as KCDC. Licensed to the St. Vrain Valley School District, it was used by the Career Development Center, a vocational high school in Longmont, for training students in communications. When the training program ended, the District no longer had a use for the station and agreed to transfer the license to Longmont Community Radio in March 2003. The station's call sign was changed to KGUD on March 15, 2004.

== See also ==
- List of community radio stations in the United States
