= KIDE =

Community radio station in Hoopa, California

- Hoopa, California; United States
- Frequency: 91.3 MHz
- Branding: KIDE 91.3

Programming
- Format: Community Radio
- Affiliations: Pacifica Radio; Native Voice One

Ownership
- Owner: Hoopa Valley Tribe

History
- First air date: 1980

Technical information
- Licensing authority: FCC
- Facility ID: 27612
- Class: A
- ERP: 195 watts
- HAAT: -475 meters
- Transmitter coordinates: 41°3′50.4″N 123°41′9.2″W

Links
- Public license information: Public file; LMS
- Webcast: Listen live
- Website: www.kidefm.org

KIDE (91.3 MHz is a community radio station serving Hoopa, California, United States. The station is owned by the Hoopa Valley Tribe, and affiliated with the Pacifica Radio Network. It is one of the few stations in the United States to be solar powered.

== See also ==
- List of community radio stations in the United States
