= WBER =

Radio station in Rochester, New York

Coordinates: 43.033°N 77.419°W

- United States
- Broadcast area: Rochester, New York
- Frequency: 90.5 (MHz)

Programming
- Format: Alternative radio

Ownership
- Owner: Monroe BOCES #1

History
- First air date: 1975 (as WRHR); 1987 (as WBER)
- Former call signs: WRHR (1975–1987)
- Call sign meaning: BOCES Educational Radio

Technical information
- Class: B1
- ERP: 2,500 watts
- HAAT: 127 meters

Links
- Website: wber.org/

WBER is a listener and school district supported community radio station in Rochester, New York, United States, owned and operated by the BOCES, Monroe #1. The station was founded in 1985. The call letters correspond to BOCES Educational Radio, with the pre-1985 call letters (WRHR) corresponding to Rush Henrietta Radio, the original licensee of the station (the Rush-Henrietta Central School District). The station's playlist is Alternative radio, with some new titles added to the regular rotation via a "test track," listener-reporting mechanism. WBER also presents local concerts by popular performers.

== Pre-WBER history ==
As WRHR, the station was a student-run club operated out of the Rush Henrietta School District. The station was granted a low-power Class D license (10 watts) in 1975. The radio format was at first Top-40, and eventually included "alternative" music by bands such as the B-52's and Talking Heads. School board meetings were also broadcast on a tape-delayed basis. The school district provided support for students who broadcast live play-by-play basketball from schools within the local Section V scholastic athletic conference. In the first year of operation the Station Manager was Brad Landon, a High School Senior afflicted with muscular dystrophy, and Landon had the first show that was broadcast.

== Partnership with Monroe BOCES ==
In 1985 WRHR was acquired by the Monroe BOCES #1 Technology Department, renamed WBER (effective March 2, 1987), and upgraded to 2,500 watts. Since that time WBER has been serving the Rochester, NY and Western New York area as a training ground for students and other members of the community interested in learning about radio broadcasting. Through the BOCES partnership, WBER programming originates in part from area school districts, including Fairport, Webster, and Brighton.

== See also ==
- List of community radio stations in the United States
