= WDVR =

- Delaware Township, New Jersey; United States
- Frequency: 89.7 MHz

Programming
- Format: Variety

Ownership
- Owner: Penn-Jersey Educational Radio Corp.

History
- First air date: February 19, 1990
- Call sign meaning: "Delaware Valley Radio"

Technical information
- Licensing authority: FCC
- Facility ID: 52174
- Class: A
- ERP: 6 watts horizontal; 3,800 watts vertical
- HAAT: 221 meters (725 ft)
- Transmitter coordinates: 40°30′36.3″N 74°57′32.6″W
- Translators: 96.9 W245CC (Trenton); 92.3 W222BV (Harmony Township); 95.9 W240CY (Mount Bethel); 106.7 W294BQ (Easton, Pennsylvania)
- Repeater: 90.5 WPNJ (Easton, Pennsylvania)

Links
- Public license information: Public file; LMS
- Website: www.wdvrfm.org

WDVR (89.7 FM) is a community radio station serving parts of western New Jersey and eastern Pennsylvania, including New Hope and Trenton. The station, which broadcasts a variety radio format, is licensed to Delaware Township, Hunterdon County, New Jersey. Its transmitter tower is on Pittsfield Road near Frenchtown-Flemington Road in Frenchtown, New Jersey.

WDVR is owned by Penn-Jersey Educational Radio Corporation. It has its offices and studios on Rosemont-Ringoes Road in Sergeantsville, New Jersey. WDVR is staffed by over fifty volunteers who have expertise in their genre of music or talk. Hosts are free to choose music and create their shows themselves within the boundaries of "family friendly" programming. WDVR is supported by donations from its audience and from local businesses which make underwriting contributions in exchange for being thanked on the air.

In addition, WDVR simulcasts on 90.5 WPNJ in Easton, Pennsylvania, and on four FM translators: W245CC at 96.9 MHz in Trenton, New Jersey, W240CY at 95.9 MHz in Mount Bethel, New Jersey, W222BV at 92.3 MHz in Harmony Township, New Jersey and W249BQ at 106.7 in Easton, Pennsylvania.

The station website says, "WDVR is the only station in the North East which airs a two-hour, live Traditional Country Music show twice a month before a live audience." The shows are broadcast from the Virginia Napurano Center which is in an old church in Sergeantsville. The station was founded by Frank and Virginia (Ginny Lee) Napurano. It signed on the air on February 19, 1990.

== See also ==
- List of community radio stations in the United States
