= KPYT-LP =

Radio station of the Pascua Yaqui Tribe

- Tucson, Arizona; United States
- Broadcast area: Pascua Yaqui Reservation
- Frequency: 100.3 MHz
- Branding: Yoeme Radio

Programming
- Format: Variety

Ownership
- Owner: Pascua Yaqui Tribe

History
- First air date: June 21, 2005
- Call sign meaning: Pascua Yaqui Tribe

Technical information
- Licensing authority: FCC
- Facility ID: 134640
- Class: L1
- ERP: 100 watts
- HAAT: 20.6 meters (68 feet)
- Transmitter coordinates: 32°07′03″N 111°03′47″W

Links
- Public license information: LMS
- Website: KPYT-LP

KPYT-LP (100.3 FM, "Yoeme Radio") is a radio station licensed to serve Tucson, Arizona, owned by the Pascua Yaqui Tribe. It airs a Variety format. KPYT-LP is an affiliate of Native Public Media. Hector Youtsey is the manager and director of KPYT-LP.

The station was assigned the KPYT-LP call letters by the Federal Communications Commission on September 12, 2005.

== See also ==
- List of community radio stations in the United States
