= KDKO =

Radio station in Lake Andes, South Dakota

- Lake Andes, South Dakota; United States
- Broadcast area: Yankton Indian Reservation
- Frequency: 89.5 MHz
- Branding: Dakota Talk Radio

Programming
- Format: Community radio

Ownership
- Owner: Native American Community Board, Inc.

History
- First air date: 2009
- Call sign meaning: Dakota

Technical information
- Licensing authority: FCC
- Facility ID: 172838
- Class: A
- ERP: 800 watts
- HAAT: 145 meters (476 ft)
- Transmitter coordinates: 43°4′59″N 98°28′23″W

Links
- Public license information: Public file; LMS
- Webcast: Listen live
- Website: nativeshop.org/dakota-talk-radio

KDKO 89.5 FM is a Community radio station, owned and operated by the Native American Community Board, Inc. Licensed to Lake Andes, South Dakota, the station serves the Yankton Indian Reservation.

== See also ==
- List of community radio stations in the United States
