= KNYO-LP =

- Fort Bragg, California; United States
- Frequency: 107.7 MHz

Ownership
- Owner: Noyo Radio Project

Technical information
- Licensing authority: FCC
- Facility ID: 123415
- Class: L1
- ERP: 87 watts
- HAAT: 30.3 meters (99 ft)
- Transmitter coordinates: 39°24′51″N 123°47′05″W

Links
- Public license information: LMS
- Website: knyo.org

KNYO-LP (107.7 FM) is a low-power FM radio station licensed to Fort Bragg, California, United States. KNYO is a project of the Noyo Radio Project, a non-profit educational public-benefit corporation.

== History ==
The Noyo Radio Project was incorporated in October 2000. KNYO-LP received its Construction Permit from the FCC on February 14, 2005, and began broadcasting 24 hours per day, 7 days per week on May 7, 2006, at 107.7 FM.

The station's transmitting antenna was originally mounted at the 22 meter (72-foot) level of a 24 meter (80-foot) pine tree, which fell on January 4, 2023.

== See also ==
- List of community radio stations in the United States
