= KCUW-LP =

Pendleton, Oregon; United States
- Frequency: 104.1 MHz (HD Radio)

Programming
- Format: Ethnic Native American

Ownership
- Owner: Confederated Tribes of the Umatilla Indian Reservation

History
- First air date: February 2, 2004
- Former call signs: KUIR-LP (2003–2003)
- Call sign meaning: Cayuse, Umatilla, Walla Walla

Technical information
- Licensing authority: FCC
- Facility ID: 134558
- Class: L1
- ERP: 100 watts
- HAAT: −76.1 meters (−250 ft)
- Transmitter coordinates: 45°39′51″N 118°41′09″W

Links
- Public license information: LMS
- Website: kcuwradio.org

KCUW-LP (104.1 FM) is a radio station licensed to Pendleton, Oregon, United States. The station is currently owned by Confederated Tribes of the Umatilla Indian Reservation.

The station carries local programming aimed at the local Native American population.

This includes a program known as Wisdom of the Elders. The station is managed by members of the Confederated Tribes of the Umatilla Indian Reservation.

== History ==
The station was assigned the call letters KUIR-LP on February 11, 2003. On October 15, 2003, the station changed its call sign to the current KCUW-LP. The station has changed frequency three times within the last 20 years. At sign on, it was on 101.1, switching to 104.3, and finally 104.1 The station was one of over a thousand new LPFM stations to sign on between 2003 and 2014. The station is known for carrying a mix of music and traditional storytelling with talk programming on topics such as gang awareness and breast cancer. It is one of many stations in United States carrying programming of its type. KCUW celebrated its 20th year of broadcasting in 2024. The station started in a small facility, but now has studios in a public service facility. There are plans to move the transmitter to another side of Pendleton, improving the station's range. The tribe is applying for another LPFM, which would simulcast KCUW. The station is also hoping to add online streaming.

== See also ==
- List of community radio stations in the United States
