= WRFR-LP =

- Rockland, Maine; United States
- Frequency: 93.3 MHz
- Branding: 93.3 fm WRFR-LP

Ownership
- Owner: The Old School

Technical information
- Licensing authority: FCC
- Facility ID: 124066
- Class: L1
- ERP: 100 watts
- HAAT: 11.5 meters
- Transmitter coordinates: 44°6′37″N 69°6′43″W

Links
- Public license information: LMS

WRFR-LP (93.3 FM) is a radio station licensed to Rockland, Maine, United States.

The station is licensed to the Old School and has been established, WRFR as an independent community radio station. WRFR-LP is non-commercial and is operated entirely by volunteers, playing rhythm and blues, electronic, rock and, several talk shows. The station was formerly repeated in nearby Camden on W257BI 99.3 MHz, until its license was surrendered to the Federal Communications Commission on January 12, 2022.

The construction permit was granted on March 19, 2001. The station has been broadcasting 24/7 since Valentine's Day, 2002.

== See also ==
- List of community radio stations in the United States
