= WRRS-LP =

- Pittsfield, Massachusetts; United States
- Frequency: 104.3 MHz

Ownership
- Owner: United Cerebral Palsy of Western Massachusetts; (UCP of Western Massachusetts, Inc.)

History
- First air date: February 5, 2005
- Call sign meaning: Radio Reading Service

Technical information
- Licensing authority: FCC
- Facility ID: 133782
- Class: L1
- ERP: 100 watts
- HAAT: 14.4 meters (47 ft)
- Transmitter coordinates: 42°27′34.00″N 73°16′31.00″W

Links
- Public license information: LMS
- Website: ucpwma.org/assistive-technology-at/berkshiretalkingchronicle/

WRRS-LP (104.3 FM) is a radio station licensed to Pittsfield, Massachusetts, United States. The station serves the Pittsfield area and is currently a program of United Cerebral Palsy of Berkshire County.

== See also ==
- List of community radio stations in the United States
