= WOBO =

Radio station in Batavia, Ohio

- Batavia, Ohio; United States
- Broadcast area: Cincinnati, Ohio
- Frequency: 88.7 MHz (HD Radio)
- Branding: 88.7 FM

Programming
- Format: Bluegrass/Classic Country/Adult Standards

Ownership
- Owner: Educational Community Radio, Inc.

Technical information
- Licensing authority: FCC
- Facility ID: 71288
- Class: B
- ERP: 31,000 watts
- HAAT: 142 meters (466 ft)
- Transmitter coordinates: 39°03′43″N 84°05′50″W

Links
- Public license information: Public file; LMS
- Webcast: Listen Live
- Website: wobofm.com

WOBO (88.7 FM) is a radio station broadcasting a Variety format. Licensed to Batavia, Ohio, United States, it serves the Cincinnati area. The station is currently owned by Educational Community Radio, Inc. It sometimes can come in as far south as Georgetown, Kentucky some 130 miles from Batavia, Ohio.

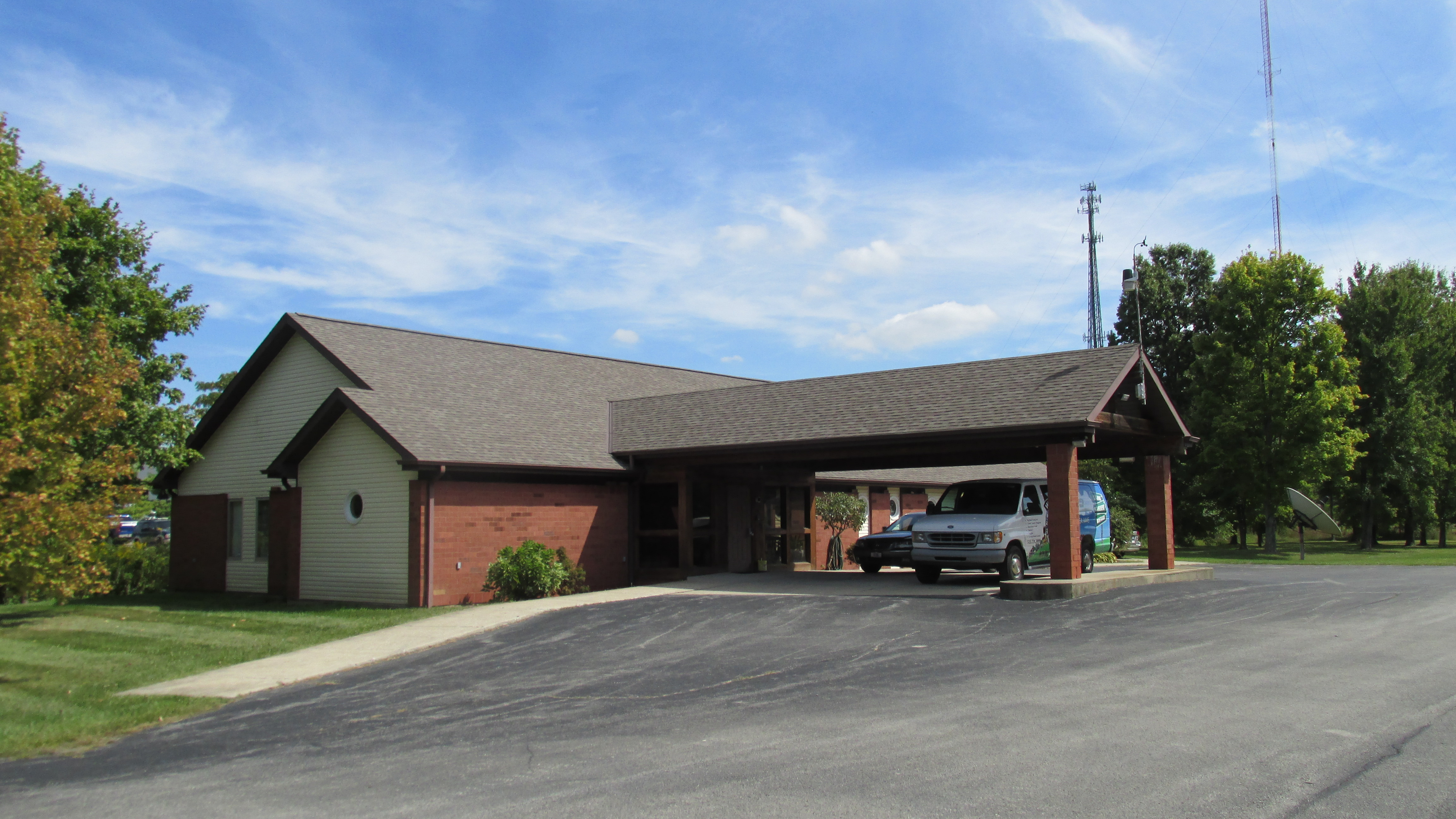
WOBO radio station outside of Batavia, Ohio.

Previous logo

== See also ==
- List of community radio stations in the United States
