= KISL =

Public radio station in Avalon, California, United States

- Avalon, California; United States
- Broadcast area: Avalon, California and vicinity
- Frequency: 88.7 MHz
- Branding: "Island Radio"

Programming
- Format: Public Radio

Ownership
- Owner: Catalina Island Performing Arts Foundation

History
- First air date: 1988
- Former call signs: KPJO (1988–1993); KXLW (2006)
- Call sign meaning: K ISLand

Technical information
- Licensing authority: FCC
- Facility ID: 80000
- Class: A
- ERP: 200 watts
- HAAT: 6 meters
- Transmitter coordinates: 33°20′32″N 118°19′11″W

Links
- Public license information: Public file; LMS
- Webcast: Listen Live via audiorealm Listen Live via direct streaming URL
- Website: kislavalon.com

KISL (88.7 FM) is a radio station licensed to Avalon, California, United States, the station serves the Avalon area. The station is owned by Catalina Island Performing Arts Foundation.

== History ==
The station was assigned the call letters KPJO on September 2, 1988. On September 24, 1993, the station's call sign was changed to KISL. On April 3, 2006, it was changed again to KXLW, and on May 17, 2006, it was returned to KISL.

== See also ==
- List of community radio stations in the United States
