= KBRP-LP =

- Bisbee, Arizona; United States
- Broadcast area: Cochise County, Arizona
- Frequency: 96.1 MHz
- Branding: Bisbee's Radio for the People

Programming
- Format: Variety
- Affiliations: Pacifica Radio

Ownership
- Owner: Bisbee Radio Project Inc.

History
- First air date: November 21, 2004
- Call sign meaning: "Bisbee Radio Project"

Technical information
- Licensing authority: FCC
- Facility ID: 132622
- Class: L1
- ERP: 5 watts
- HAAT: 137.3 meters (450 feet)
- Transmitter coordinates: 31°28′54″N 109°57′35″W

Links
- Public license information: LMS
- Webcast: Listen live
- Website: www.kbrpradio.com

KBRP-LP (96.1 FM, "Bisbee's Radio for the People") is a community-oriented radio station licensed to Bisbee, Arizona, and owned by Bisbee Radio Project Inc. It airs a Variety format. The station derives some of its programming from Pacifica Radio.

The station was assigned the KBRP-LP call letters by the Federal Communications Commission on February 24, 2004.

KBRP-LP relies on donations by listeners, underwriters, and community events for financial support.

== See also ==
- List of community radio stations in the United States
