= KSOI (FM) =

- Murray, Iowa; United States
- Frequency: 91.9 MHz

Programming
- Format: Community radio

Ownership
- Owner: Grand River Valley Radio, Inc.

History
- First air date: June 30, 2012
- Call sign meaning: SOuthern Iowa

Technical information
- Licensing authority: FCC
- Class: C2
- ERP: 19,000 watts
- HAAT: 148.1 meters (486 ft)
- Transmitter coordinates: 40°56′44.1″N 94°08′49.4″W

Links
- Public license information: Public file; LMS
- Website: ksoifm.com

KSOI (91.9 MHz) is a community radio station broadcasting from Murray, Iowa to southern Iowa. The 91.1 KW signal primarily serves Clarke, Union, Ringgold, Decatur, Taylor, Madison, Adair, Warren, Lucas, Adams, Wayne, and Polk counties with a variety of music and local features.

The KSOI license is held by Grand River Valley Radio, Inc., a non-profit with 501(c)3 status founded to explore the potential of building a community radio station to serve Southern Iowa.

Joe Hynek founded, designed, and built the non-profit educational station earning a construction permit.

KSOI studios operate from a room in the Murray Mansion located at 1002 Maple Street, Murray, IA.

== See also ==
- List of community radio stations in the United States
