= KFOK-LP =

- Georgetown, California; United States
- Frequency: 95.1 MHz

Programming
- Format: Community Radio

Ownership
- Owner: American River Folk Society

History
- First air date: 2001

Technical information
- Licensing authority: FCC
- Facility ID: 124842
- Class: L1
- ERP: 1 watt
- HAAT: 351.2 meters
- Transmitter coordinates: 38°54′46.7″N 120°48′49.6″W

Links
- Public license information: LMS
- Website: kfok.org

KFOK-LP (95.1 FM) is a low-power community radio station licensed to Georgetown, California, United States. The station is owned by American River Folk Society.

== See also ==
- List of community radio stations in the United States
