= WHYS-LP =

- Eau Claire, Wisconsin; United States
- Broadcast area: Eau Claire/Chippewa Falls
- Frequency: 96.3 MHz

Programming
- Format: Community Radio
- Affiliations: Pacifica Radio Network

Ownership
- Owner: Northern Thunder, Inc.

History
- First air date: April 2005

Technical information
- Licensing authority: FCC
- Facility ID: 131585
- Class: L1
- ERP: 100 watts
- HAAT: −5.2 m (−17 ft)
- Transmitter coordinates: 44°48′39.00″N 91°29′50.00″W

Links
- Public license information: LMS
- Webcast: Listen Live
- Website: www.whysradio.org

WHYS-LP (96.3 FM) is a radio station located in the Eau Claire, Wisconsin media market. The station is currently owned by Northern Thunder, Inc. The station presents a wide variety of music and public affairs programming including the syndicated weekly radio news magazines Democracy Now! and Between the Lines.

In addition to its radio programming, the station hosts annual events including a bluegrass festival, Saint Patrick's Day celebration, 24 hour trivia marathon, and Earth Day celebration. Grammy-winning musician Justin Vernon worked at the station during its early years, and the station was the first to play his music.

== See also ==
- List of community radio stations in the United States
