= WQSV-LP =

- Staunton, Virginia; United States
- Broadcast area: Metro Staunton
- Frequency: 106.3 MHz
- Branding: 106.3 WQSV

Programming
- Format: Adult album alternative

Ownership
- Owner: Staunton Media Alliance

History
- First air date: December 31, 2015
- Call sign meaning: Staunton Virginia

Technical information
- Licensing authority: FCC
- Facility ID: 192543
- Class: L1
- ERP: 100 watts
- HAAT: 29.9 meters (98 ft)
- Transmitter coordinates: 38°9′7.0″N 79°4′48.0″W

Links
- Public license information: LMS
- Webcast: Listen live
- Website: wqsv.org

WQSV-LP is an Adult Album Alternative formatted broadcast radio station licensed to and serving Staunton, Virginia. WQSV-LP is owned and operated by Staunton Media Alliance.

== See also ==
- List of community radio stations in the United States
