= WRBG-LP =

- Millsboro, Delaware; United States
- Frequency: 106.5 MHz

Programming
- Format: Variety

Ownership
- Owner: Rhythm and Blues Group Harmony Association, Inc.

History
- First air date: 2002
- Former frequencies: 107.9 MHz (2002–2013)

Technical information
- Licensing authority: FCC
- Facility ID: 131943
- Class: L1
- ERP: 100 watts
- HAAT: 25 meters (82 ft)
- Transmitter coordinates: 38°34′13.4″N 75°18′10.6″W

Links
- Public license information: LMS

WRBG-LP (106.5 FM) is a radio station licensed to serve Millsboro, Delaware. The station is owned by Rhythm and Blues Group Harmony Association, Inc. It airs a Variety format featuring a diverse mix of religious and secular music, talk shows, and community affairs programs.

The station was assigned the WRBG-LP call letters by the Federal Communications Commission on January 21, 2002.

== See also ==
- List of community radio stations in the United States
