= KUBU-LP =

Low-power FM radio station in Sacramento, California

- Sacramento, California; United States
- Frequency: 96.5 MHz

Programming
- Language: English
- Format: Community

Ownership
- Owner: Sacramento Community Cable Foundation

History
- First air date: 2014

Technical information
- Licensing authority: FCC
- Facility ID: 192473
- Class: L1
- ERP: 45 watts
- HAAT: 35 meters (115 ft)
- Transmitter coordinates: 38°34′26.5″N 121°28′45.2″W

Links
- Public license information: LMS
- Webcast: Listen live
- Website: accesssacramento.org

KUBU-LP (96.5 FM) is an American low-power FM radio station owned by the Sacramento Community Cable Foundation based in Sacramento, California. KUBU-LP is a community broadcast station that features programming ranging from alternative news, talk, and many music formats.

== See also ==
- List of community radio stations in the United States
