= WAIF =

Coordinates: 39.127°N 84.485°W

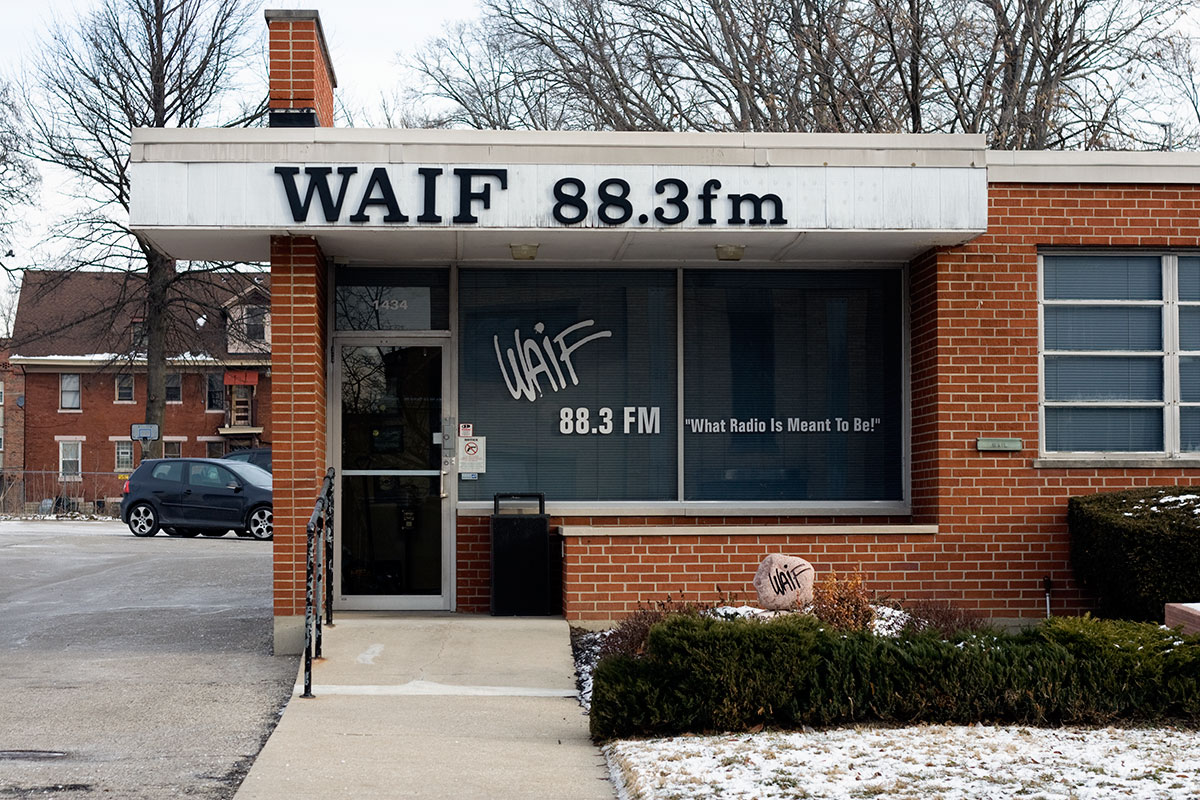

Cincinnati, Ohio; United States
- Frequency: 88.3 FM

Programming
- Format: Community radio

Ownership
- Owner: The Real Stepchild Radio of Cincinnati, Inc.

History
- First air date: December 1975

Technical information
- Licensing authority: FCC
- Facility ID: 63203
- Class: A
- ERP: 1,600 watts
- HAAT: 120 meters

Links
- Public license information: Public file; LMS
- Webcast: Listen Live
- Website: www.waifradio.org

WAIF (88.3 FM) is a community radio station licensed to Cincinnati, Ohio.

== Overview ==
WAIF is an all-volunteer community radio station. WAIF reception varies because of the hilly local terrain, but it can be heard over the air within the Cincinnati-area I-275 belt in Southwestern Ohio, Northern Kentucky, and Southeastern Indiana. WAIF also broadcasts over the Internet.

Organizing for the station began in 1973. WAIF went on the air in 1975. Rather than wait for an open frequency, the organizers decided to share the 88.3 MHz frequency with the local vocational school's station, WJVS, an arrangement that remained in place until WJVS ceased operations on May 10, 2012 (over a week earlier than expected), following the failure of its transmitter. Prior to this, WJVS broadcast on the 88.3 frequency during regular school hours, while WAIF broadcast at all other times.

WAIF is managed by a Board of Trustees of between 7 and 11 members, elected to two-year terms at an annual membership meeting in September of each year. The Board of Trustees elects officers and appoints staff and management for the station.

WAIF's motto is "What Radio Is Meant To Be" Originally, the station referred to their organization as "Stepchild Radio", and had close ties to WYSO, the Antioch College station in Yellow Springs.

== Programming ==
Over the years WAIF has broadcast the work of more than a thousand volunteer programmers, producers and activists. As of June 2006, local programmers do all programming. Individual programs vary in length, but run between one and three hours, once a week.

=== Music programs ===
- Gospel
- Jazz
- Doo-Wop
- Bluegrass
- Blues
- Surf Music
- Hip-Hop
- Christian Progressive
- Rock
- Local
- Caribbean
- Independent
- Folk
- Novelty Music
- College Radio/Alternative

=== Talk-radio programs ===
- Current Affairs
- African Perspectives on the News
- African Village Buka
- International Talk
- Labor Unions
- Women's Issues
- Racial Issues
- Local Affairs

=== Ethnic heritage programs ===
- German
- Italian
- Greek
- Native American
- Indian & Pakistani
- Africa
- Latin
- Appalachian
- Argentine
- Nepali- Hamro Aawaz

=== Previous programs ===
- The Chris & Rob Late Night Talk Show
- Art Damage

== See also ==
- WAIF Kids
