= KTNA =

Coordinates: 62.318°N 150.300°W

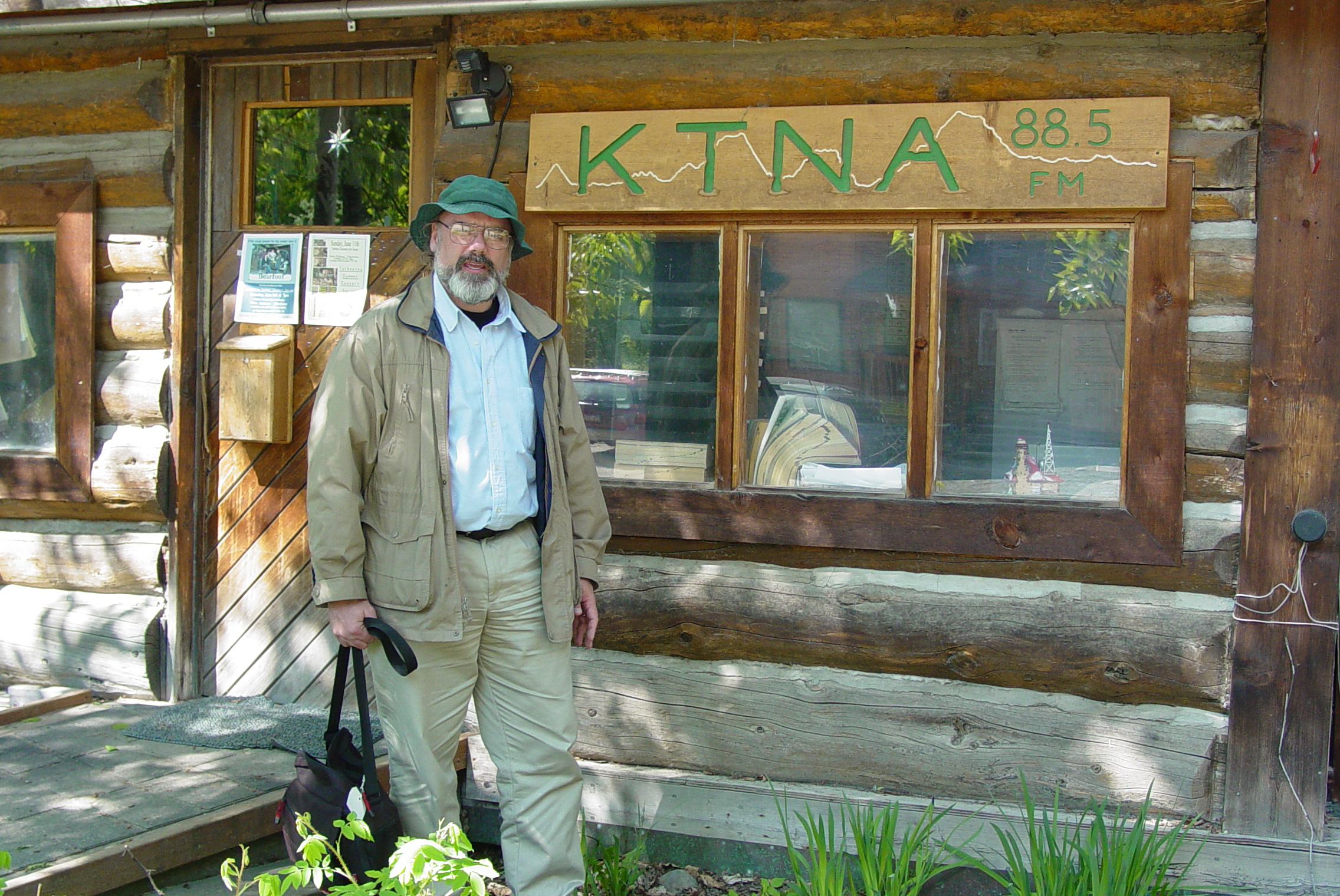
- Talkeetna, Alaska; United States
- Frequency: 88.9 (MHz)

Programming
- Format: Public radio
- Affiliations: National Public Radio

Ownership
- Owner: Talkeetna Community Radio, Inc.

History
- First air date: January 17, 1993

Technical information
- Licensing authority: FCC
- Facility ID: 64555
- Class: C3
- ERP: 7,200 watts
- HAAT: 22 meters (72 ft)

Links
- Public license information: Public file; LMS
- Webcast: https://ktna.org/listen.html
- Website: http://www.ktna.org/

KTNA (88.9 FM) is an NPR member radio station in Talkeetna, Alaska. It features National Public Radio as well as diverse local music and public affairs programming.
