= List of FM radio stations in the United States by call sign (initial letters KQ–KS) =

This is a list of FM radio stations in the United States having call signs beginning with the letters KQ through KS. Low-power FM radio stations, those with designations such as KQAT-LP, have not been included in this list.

== KQ-- ==
Callsign	Frequency	City of license
KQAC	89.9 FM	Portland, Oregon
KQAI	89.1 FM	Roswell, New Mexico
KQAK	105.7 FM	Bend, Oregon
KQAL	89.5 FM	Winona, Minnesota
KQAV	93.5 FM	Rosamond, California
KQAY-FM	92.7 FM	Tucumcari, New Mexico
KQAZ	101.7 FM	Springerville, Arizona
KQBA	107.5 FM	Los Alamos, New Mexico
KQBB	100.5 FM	Center, Texas
KQBC	90.5 FM	Benton City, Washington
KQBI	91.7 FM	Encinal, Texas
KQBK	104.7 FM	Waldron, Arkansas
KQBL	100.7 FM	Mountain Home, Idaho
KQBM	90.7 FM	San Andreas, California
KQBO	107.5 FM	Rio Grande City, Texas
KQBQ	100.1 FM	Meyersville, Texas
KQBR	99.5 FM	Lubbock, Texas
KQBS	97.7 FM	Potosi, Missouri
KQBT	93.7 FM	Houston, Texas
KQBV	88.5 FM	Adel, Iowa
KQBZ	96.9 FM	Brownwood, Texas
KQCH	94.1 FM	Omaha, Nebraska
KQCI	91.5 FM	Freer, Texas
KQCJ	93.9 FM	Cambridge, Illinois
KQCL	95.9 FM	Faribault, Minnesota
KQCR-FM	98.9 FM	Parkersburg, Iowa
KQCV-FM	95.1 FM	Shawnee, Oklahoma
KQDI-FM	106.1 FM	Great Falls, Montana
KQDJ-FM	101.1 FM	Valley City, North Dakota
KQDL	89.1 FM	Hines, Oregon
KQDR	107.3 FM	Savoy, Texas
KQDS-FM	94.9 FM	Duluth, Minnesota
KQDY	94.5 FM	Bismarck, North Dakota
KQDZ	101.7 FM	Elsberry, Missouri
KQED-FM	88.5 FM	San Francisco, California
KQEI-FM	89.3 FM	North Highlands, California
KQEL	107.9 FM	Alamogordo, New Mexico
KQEO	107.1 FM	Idaho Falls, Idaho
KQEW	102.3 FM	Fordyce, Arkansas
KQEZ	99.3 FM	St. Regis, Montana
KQFC	97.9 FM	Boise, Idaho
KQFE	88.9 FM	Springfield, Oregon
KQFM	93.7 FM	Hermiston, Oregon
KQFO	100.1 FM	Pasco, Washington
KQFR	90.7 FM	Moyle Springs, Idaho
KQFX	104.3 FM	Borger, Texas
KQFZ-FM	89.1 FM	Valley View, Texas
KQHE	92.7 FM	Fairbanks, Alaska
KQHK	103.9 FM	McCook, Nebraska
KQHM	102.7 FM	Zapata, Texas
KQHN	97.3 FM	Waskom, Texas
KQHR	88.1 FM	The Dalles, Oregon
KQHT	96.1 FM	Crookston, Minnesota
KQIB	102.9 FM	Idabel, Oklahoma
KQIC	102.5 FM	Willmar, Minnesota
KQID-FM	93.1 FM	Alexandria, Louisiana
KQIE	104.7 FM	Redlands, California
KQIK-FM	105.9 FM	Haileyville, Oklahoma
KQIQ	88.3 FM	Beatrice, Nebraska
KQIZ-FM	93.1 FM	Amarillo, Texas
KQJO	99.3 FM	St. Joseph, Louisiana
KQKI-FM	95.3 FM	Bayou Vista, Louisiana
KQKK	101.9 FM	Walker, Minnesota
KQKL	95.3 FM	Keokuk, Iowa
KQKQ-FM	98.5 FM	Council Bluffs, Iowa
KQKS	107.5 FM	Lakewood, Colorado
KQKX	106.7 FM	Norfolk, Nebraska
KQKY	105.9 FM	Kearney, Nebraska
KQKZ	92.1 FM	Bakersfield, California
KQLA	103.5 FM	Ogden, Kansas
KQLB	106.9 FM	Los Banos, California
KQLC	90.7 FM	Sealy, Texas
KQLF	88.3 FM	Ottumwa, Iowa
KQLK	97.9 FM	De Ridder, Louisiana
KQLM	107.9 FM	Odessa, Texas
KQLR	89.7 FM	Whitehall, Montana
KQLT	103.7 FM	Casper, Wyoming
KQLV	90.7 FM	Santa Fe, New Mexico
KQLX-FM	106.1 FM	Lisbon, North Dakota
KQLZ	95.7 FM	New England, North Dakota
KQMA	92.5 FM	Phillipsburg, Kansas
KQMC	90.1 FM	Hawthorne, Nevada
KQMD	88.1 FM	Quemado, Texas
KQMG-FM	95.3 FM	Independence, Iowa
KQMI	88.9 FM	Manzanita, Oregon
KQMJ	104.7 FM	Blanket, Texas
KQMN	91.5 FM	Thief River Falls, Minnesota
KQMO	97.7 FM	Shell Knob, Missouri
KQMQ-FM	93.1 FM	Honolulu, Hawaii
KQMR	100.3 FM	Globe, Arizona
KQMT	99.5 FM	Denver, Colorado
KQMV	92.5 FM	Bellevue, Washington
KQMX	105.7 FM	Lost Hills, California
KQMY	102.1 FM	Paia, Hawaii
KQNC	88.1 FM	Quincy, California
KQNG-FM	93.5 FM	Lihue, Hawaii
KQNK-FM	106.7 FM	Norton, Kansas
KQNU	102.3 FM	Onawa, Iowa
KQNV	89.9 FM	Fallon, Nevada
KQNY	91.9 FM	Quincy, California
KQOA	91.1 FM	Morton, Texas
KQOB	96.9 FM	Enid, Oklahoma
KQOC	88.1 FM	Gleneden Beach, Oregon
KQOD	100.1 FM	Stockton, California
KQOH	91.9 FM	Marshfield, Missouri
KQOL	105.3 FM	Sleepy Hollow, Wyoming
KQOR	105.3 FM	Mena, Arkansas
KQOS	91.7 FM	Albany, Texas
KQOU	89.1 FM	Clinton, Oklahoma
KQOW	90.3 FM	Bellingham, Washington
KQPA-FM	91.9 FM	Paris, Texas
KQPD	91.1 FM	Ardmore, Oklahoma
KQPI	99.5 FM	Aberdeen, Idaho
KQPM	105.9 FM	Ukiah, California
KQPR	96.1 FM	Albert Lea, Minnesota
KQPZ	95.9 FM	Lewistown, Montana
KQQA	90.5 FM	Shelton, Nebraska
KQQF	98.9 FM	Coffeyville, Kansas
KQQJ	90.7 FM	Juneau, Alaska
KQQK	107.9 FM	Beaumont, Texas
KQQL	107.9 FM	Anoka, Minnesota
KQQM	88.3 FM	Miles City, Montana
KQQN	89.3 FM	Nome, Alaska
KQQS	89.3 FM	Sitka, Alaska
KQRA	102.1 FM	Brookline, Missouri
KQRC-FM	98.9 FM	Leavenworth, Kansas
KQRI	105.5 FM	Bosque Farms, New Mexico
KQRK	99.7 FM	Pablo, Montana
KQRN	107.3 FM	Mitchell, South Dakota
KQRQ	92.3 FM	Rapid City, South Dakota
KQRS-FM	92.5 FM	Golden Valley, Minnesota
KQRT	105.1 FM	Las Vegas, Nevada
KQRV	96.9 FM	Deer Lodge, Montana
KQRX	95.1 FM	Midland, Texas
KQSA	97.9 FM	Batesville, Texas
KQSD-FM	91.9 FM	Lowry, South Dakota
KQSE	102.5 FM	Craig, Colorado
KQSF	101.9 FM	Sioux Falls, South Dakota
KQSH	90.7 FM	Dodge City, Kansas
KQSK	97.5 FM	Chadron, Nebraska
KQSM-FM	92.1 FM	Fayetteville, Arkansas
KQSN	104.7 FM	Ponca City, Oklahoma
KQSR	100.9 FM	Yuma, Arizona
KQSS	101.9 FM	Miami, Arizona
KQST	102.9 FM	Sedona, Arizona
KQSW	96.5 FM	Rock Springs, Wyoming
KQTC	99.5 FM	Christoval, Texas
KQTM	101.7 FM	Rio Rancho, New Mexico
KQTO	88.1 FM	Hurley, New Mexico
KQTX	98.1 FM	Quanah, Texas
KQTY-FM	106.7 FM	Borger, Texas
KQTZ	105.9 FM	Hobart, Oklahoma
KQUE-FM	88.1 FM	Bay City, Texas
KQUL	102.7 FM	Lake Ozark, Missouri
KQUR	94.9 FM	Laredo, Texas
KQUS-FM	97.5 FM	Hot Springs, Arkansas
KQVI-FM	89.9 FM	Cedar Lake, Texas
KQVK	91.9 FM	Kivalina, Alaska
KQVO	97.7 FM	Calexico, California
KQVT	92.3 FM	Victoria, Texas
KQWB-FM	105.1 FM	Breckenridge, Minnesota
KQWC-FM	95.7 FM	Webster City, Iowa
KQWS	90.1 FM	Omak, Washington
KQXB	89.9 FM	Breckenridge, Texas
KQXC-FM	103.9 FM	Wichita Falls, Texas
KQXE	91.1 FM	Eastland, Texas
KQXI	91.5 FM	Granite Falls, Washington
KQXL-FM	106.5 FM	New Roads, Louisiana
KQXR	100.3 FM	Payette, Idaho
KQXS	89.1 FM	Stephenville, Texas
KQXT-FM	101.9 FM	San Antonio, Texas
KQXX-FM	105.5 FM	Mission, Texas
KQXY-FM	94.1 FM	Beaumont, Texas
KQXZ	104.9 FM	Richland Springs, Texas
KQYB	98.3 FM	Spring Grove, Minnesota
KQYZ	99.1 FM	Emerado, North Dakota
KQZB	100.5 FM	Troy, Idaho
KQZQ	98.3 FM	Kiowa, Kansas
KQZR	107.3 FM	Hayden, Colorado
KQZZ	96.7 FM	Crary, North Dakota

== KR-- ==
Callsign	Frequency	City of license
KRAB	106.1 FM	Greenacres, California
KRAF	88.3 FM	Fort Stockton, Texas
KRAI-FM	93.7 FM	Craig, Colorado
KRAJ	98.5 FM	Johannesburg, California
KRAK	102.1 FM	Anchorage, Alaska
KRAN	103.3 FM	Warren AFB, Wyoming
KRAO-FM	102.5 FM	Colfax, Washington
KRAR	91.9 FM	Espanola, New Mexico
KRAT	92.1 FM	Sparks, Nevada
KRAV-FM	102.3 FM	Sand Springs, Oklahoma
KRAY-FM	103.5 FM	Salinas, California
KRAZ	105.9 FM	Santa Ynez, California
KRBB	97.9 FM	Wichita, Kansas
KRBD	105.3 FM	Ketchikan, Alaska
KRBE	104.1 FM	Houston, Texas
KRBG	88.7 FM	Umbarger, Texas
KRBI-FM	105.5 FM	Saint Peter, Minnesota
KRBL	105.7 FM	Idalou, Texas
KRBM	90.9 FM	Pendleton, Oregon
KRBN	94.3 FM	Manton, California
KRBP	88.1 FM	Presidio, Texas
KRBQ	102.1 FM	San Francisco, California
KRBW	90.5 FM	Ottawa, Kansas
KRBX	89.9 FM	Caldwell, Idaho
KRBY	98.1 FM	Ruby, Alaska
KRCB-FM	104.9 FM	Rohnert Park, California
KRCC	91.5 FM	Colorado Springs, Colorado
KRCD	103.9 FM	Inglewood, California
KRCG-FM	91.1 FM	Santa Rosa, California
KRCH	101.7 FM	Rochester, Minnesota
KRCI	89.5 FM	Pinetop-Lakeside, Arizona
KRCL	90.9 FM	Salt Lake City, Utah
KRCO-FM	95.7 FM	Prineville, Oregon
KRCQ	102.3 FM	Detroit Lakes, Minnesota
KRCS	93.1 FM	Sturgis, South Dakota
KRCU	90.9 FM	Cap Girardeau, Missouri
KRCV	98.3 FM	West Covina, California
KRCW	96.3 FM	Royal City, Washington
KRCX-FM	99.9 FM	Marysville, California
KRCY-FM	96.7 FM	Lake Havasu City, Arizona
KRDA	92.1 FM	Clovis, California
KRDE	94.1 FM	San Carlos, Arizona
KRDF	88.7 FM	Red Feather Lakes, Colorado
KRDG	105.3 FM	Shingletown, California
KRDO-FM	105.5 FM	Security, Colorado
KRDP	90.7 FM	Apache Junction, Arizona
KRDQ	100.3 FM	Colby, Kansas
KRDR	105.7 FM	Alva, Oklahoma
KRDS	104.1 FM	Silverton, Colorado
KRDX	103.7 FM	Corona de Tucson, Arizona
KREC	98.1 FM	Brian Head, Utah
KRED	92.3 FM	Eureka, California
KREE	88.1 FM	Pirtleville, Arizona
KREJ	101.7 FM	Medicine Lodge, Kansas
KREK	104.9 FM	Bristow, Oklahoma
KREO	93.5 FM	James Town, Wyoming
KREP	92.1 FM	Belleville, Kansas
KRES	104.7 FM	Moberly, Missouri
KREU	92.3 FM	Roland, Oklahoma
KREZ	104.7 FM	Chaffee, Missouri
KRFA-FM	91.7 FM	Moscow, Idaho
KRFC	88.9 FM	Fort Collins, Colorado
KRFD	100.1 FM	Fleming, Colorado
KRFF	89.1 FM	Fairbanks, Alaska
KRFG	102.9 FM	Nashwauk, Minnesota
KRFH	88.7 FM	Marshalltown, Iowa
KRFI	88.1 FM	Redwood Falls, Minnesota
KRFM	98.5 FM	Show Low, Arizona
KRFN	100.9 FM	Sparks, Nevada
KRFO-FM	104.9 FM	Owatonna, Minnesota
KRFP	90.3 FM	Moscow, Idaho
KRFS-FM	103.9 FM	Superior, Nebraska
KRFX	103.5 FM	Denver, Colorado
KRFY	88.5 FM	Ponderay, Idaho
KRGH	90.9 FM	Holliday, Texas
KRGI-FM	96.5 FM	Grand Island, Nebraska
KRGL	98.5 FM	Ringgold, Louisiana
KRGM	89.9 FM	Marshall, Minnesota
KRGT	99.3 FM	Indian Springs, Nevada
KRGW	106.9 FM	Fairbanks, Alaska
KRGX	95.1 FM	Rio Grande City, Texas
KRGY	97.3 FM	Aurora, Nebraska
KRHJ	88.3 FM	Lamar, Colorado
KRHQ	102.3 FM	Indio, California
KRHR	95.1 FM	Odell, Oregon
KRHS	90.1 FM	Overland, Missouri
KRHV	93.3 FM	Big Pine, California
KRIA	103.9 FM	Plainview, Texas
KRIG-FM	104.9 FM	Nowata, Oklahoma
KRIK	100.5 FM	Refugio, Texas
KRIO-FM	97.7 FM	Roma, Texas
KRIT	93.9 FM	Parker, Arizona
KRIV-FM	101.1 FM	Winona, Minnesota
KRIX	105.5 FM	Port Isabel, Texas
KRJB	106.5 FM	Ada, Minnesota
KRJC	95.3 FM	Elko, Nevada
KRJE	89.9 FM	Hawkeye, Iowa
KRJK	97.3 FM	Lamont, California
KRJM	101.5 FM	Mahnomen, Minnesota
KRJN	93.1 FM	Log Lane Village, Colorado
KRJT	105.9 FM	Elgin, Oregon
KRKA	103.9 FM	Severance, Colorado
KRKC-FM	102.1 FM	King City, California
KRKH	97.3 FM	Wailea-Makena, Hawaii
KRKI	99.5 FM	Keystone, South Dakota
KRKL	93.3 FM	Walla Walla, Washington
KRKM	91.7 FM	Fort Washakie, Wyoming
KRKN	104.3 FM	Eldon, Iowa
KRKQ	95.5 FM	Mountain Village, Colorado
KRKR	95.1 FM	Waverly, Nebraska
KRKS-FM	94.7 FM	Lafayette, Colorado
KRKT-FM	99.9 FM	Albany, Oregon
KRKV	107.3 FM	Las Animas, Colorado
KRKX	94.1 FM	Billings, Montana
KRKY-FM	88.1 FM	Douglas, Wyoming
KRKZ-FM	94.3 FM	Chinook, Washington
KRLD-FM	105.3 FM	Dallas, Texas
KRLE	89.7 FM	Carbon Hill, Alabama
KRLF	88.5 FM	Pullman, Washington
KRLH	90.9 FM	Hereford, Texas
KRLI	103.9 FM	Malta Bend, Missouri
KRLL-FM	93.9 FM	Circle, Arkansas
KRLP	88.1 FM	Windom, Minnesota
KRLQ	94.1 FM	Hodge, Louisiana
KRLR	89.1 FM	Sulphur, Louisiana
KRLS	92.1 FM	Knoxville, Iowa
KRLT	93.9 FM	South Lake Tahoe, California
KRLU	90.1 FM	Roswell, New Mexico
KRLX	88.1 FM	Northfield, Minnesota
KRLZ	93.7 FM	Waldport, Oregon
KRMB	90.1 FM	Bisbee, Arizona
KRMC	91.7 FM	Douglas, Arizona
KRMD-FM	101.1 FM	Oil City, Louisiana
KRMG-FM	96.5 FM	Tulsa, Oklahoma
KRMH	89.7 FM	Red Mesa, Arizona
KRMK	93.7 FM	Las Vegas, New Mexico
KRMQ-FM	101.5 FM	Clovis, New Mexico
KRMR	93.3 FM	Russian Mission, Alaska
KRMS-FM	93.5 FM	Osage Beach, Missouri
KRMW	94.9 FM	Cedarville, Arkansas
KRMX	104.9 FM	Bellmead, Texas
KRNA	94.1 FM	Iowa City, Iowa
KRNB	105.7 FM	Decatur, Texas
KRNC	88.5 FM	Steamboat Springs, Colorado
KRNE-FM	91.5 FM	Merriman, Nebraska
KRNG	101.3 FM	Fallon, Nevada
KRNH	92.3 FM	Kerrville, Texas
KRNK	96.7 FM	Casper, Wyoming
KRNM	88.1 FM	Chalan Kanoa, Northern Mariana Islands
KRNN	102.7 FM	Juneau, Alaska
KRNO	106.9 FM	Incline Village, Nevada
KRNP	100.7 FM	Sutherland, Nebraska
KRNQ	96.3 FM	Keokuk, Iowa
KRNR	92.7 FM	Goldthwaite, Texas
KRNU	90.3 FM	Lincoln, Nebraska
KRNV-FM	102.1 FM	Reno, Nevada
KRNW	88.9 FM	Chillicothe, Missouri
KRNX	104.9 FM	Rye, Colorado
KRNY	102.3 FM	Kearney, Nebraska
KROA	95.7 FM	Grand Island, Nebraska
KROC-FM	106.9 FM	Rochester, Minnesota
KROG	96.9 FM	Grants Pass, Oregon
KROH	91.1 FM	Port Townsend, Washington
KROI	92.1 FM	Seabrook, Texas
KROK	95.7 FM	South Fort Polk, Louisiana
KROM	92.9 FM	San Antonio, Texas
KROQ-FM	106.7 FM	Pasadena, California
KROR	101.5 FM	Hastings, Nebraska
KROU	105.7 FM	Spencer, Oklahoma
KROV	91.1 FM	Oroville, California
KROW	101.1 FM	Cody, Wyoming
KROX-FM	101.5 FM	Buda, Texas
KRPH	99.5 FM	Morristown, Arizona
KRPM	107.5 FM	Billings, Montana
KRPR	89.9 FM	Rochester, Minnesota
KRPS	89.9 FM	Pittsburg, Kansas
KRPT	92.5 FM	Devine, Texas
KRPX	95.3 FM	Wellington, Utah
KRQA	88.1 FM	Bentonville, Arkansas
KRQB	96.1 FM	San Jacinto, California
KRQK	100.3 FM	Lompoc, California
KRQN	107.1 FM	Vinton, Iowa
KRQQ	93.7 FM	Tucson, Arizona
KRQR	106.7 FM	Orland, California
KRQT	107.1 FM	Castle Rock, Washington
KRQU	98.7 FM	Laramie, Wyoming
KRQV	92.9 FM	Tulsa, Oklahoma
KRQX-FM	98.9 FM	Hurricane, Utah
KRQZ	91.5 FM	Lompoc, California
KRRB	88.1 FM	Kuna, Idaho
KRRE	91.9 FM	Las Vegas, New Mexico
KRRG	98.1 FM	Laredo, Texas
KRRK	101.1 FM	Desert Hills, Arizona
KRRL	92.3 FM	Los Angeles
KRRM	94.7 FM	Rogue River, Oregon
KRRN	92.7 FM	Moapa Valley, Nevada
KRRO	103.7 FM	Sioux Falls, South Dakota
KRRQ	95.5 FM	Lafayette, Louisiana
KRRR	104.9 FM	Cheyenne, Wyoming
KRRT	90.9 FM	Arroyo Seco, New Mexico
KRRV-FM	100.3 FM	Alexandria, Louisiana
KRRW	105.9 FM	Winthrop, Minnesota
KRRX	106.1 FM	Burney, California
KRRY	100.9 FM	Canton, Missouri
KRSB-FM	103.1 FM	Roseburg, Oregon
KRSC-FM	91.3 FM	Claremore, Oklahoma
KRSD	88.1 FM	Sioux Falls, South Dakota
KRSE	105.7 FM	Yakima, Washington
KRSF	89.3 FM	Ridgecrest, California
KRSH	95.9 FM	Healdsburg, California
KRSJ	100.5 FM	Durango, Colorado
KRSK-FM	105.1 FM	Molalla, Oregon
KRSL-FM	95.9 FM	Russell, Kansas
KRSP-FM	103.5 FM	Salt Lake City, Utah
KRSQ	101.9 FM	Laurel, Montana
KRSS	93.5 FM	Tarkio, Missouri
KRST	92.3 FM	Albuquerque, New Mexico
KRSU	88.5 FM	Appleton, Minnesota
KRSV-FM	98.7 FM	Afton, Wyoming
KRSW	89.3 FM	Worthington, Minnesota
KRSX	95.9 FM	Goldendale, Washington
KRSY-FM	92.7 FM	La Luz, New Mexico
KRTC	88.7 FM	Truth or Consequences, New Mexico
KRTE-FM	107.3 FM	Steelville, Missouri
KRTG	88.3 FM	Carthage, Texas
KRTH	101.1 FM	Los Angeles
KRTI	106.7 FM	Grinnell, Iowa
KRTK	93.3 FM	Hermann, Missouri
KRTM	88.1 FM	Banning, California
KRTN-FM	93.9 FM	Raton, New Mexico
KRTO	97.1 FM	Guadalupe, California
KRTP	91.7 FM	Alpine, Texas
KRTR-FM	96.3 FM	Kailua, Hawaii
KRTS	93.5 FM	Marfa, Texas
KRTT	88.1 FM	Great Bend, Kansas
KRTU-FM	91.7 FM	San Antonio, Texas
KRTY	91.9 FM	Great Bend, Kansas
KRTZ	98.7 FM	Cortez, Colorado
KRUA	88.1 FM	Anchorage, Alaska
KRUC	88.9 FM	Las Cruces, New Mexico
KRUE	92.1 FM	Waseca, Minnesota
KRUF	94.5 FM	Shreveport, Louisiana
KRUI-FM	89.7 FM	Iowa City, Iowa
KRUP	99.1 FM	Dillingham, Alaska
KRUX	91.5 FM	Las Cruces, New Mexico
KRUZ	103.3 FM	Santa Barbara, California
KRVA-FM	107.1 FM	Campbell, Texas
KRVB	94.9 FM	Nampa, Idaho
KRVC	98.9 FM	Hornbrook, California
KRVE	96.1 FM	Brusly, Louisiana
KRVF	106.9 FM	Kerens, Texas
KRVG	95.5 FM	Glenwood Springs, Colorado
KRVH	91.5 FM	Rio Vista, California
KRVI	106.7 FM	Mount Vernon, Missouri
KRVK	107.9 FM	Vista West, Wyoming
KRVL	94.3 FM	Kerrville, Texas
KRVM-FM	91.9 FM	Eugene, Oregon
KRVN-FM	93.1 FM	Lexington, Nebraska
KRVO	103.1 FM	Columbia Falls, Montana
KRVP	91.5 FM	Falfurrias, Texas
KRVQ-FM	104.5 FM	Lake Isabella, California
KRVR	105.5 FM	Copperopolis, California
KRVS	88.7 FM	Lafayette, Louisiana
KRVV	100.1 FM	Bastrop, Louisiana
KRVX	103.1 FM	Wimbledon, North Dakota
KRVY-FM	97.3 FM	Starbuck, Minnesota
KRWA	90.9 FM	Rye, Colorado
KRWD	93.3 FM	Muleshoe, Texas
KRWG	90.7 FM	Las Cruces, New Mexico
KRWI	98.1 FM	Wofford Heights, California
KRWK	101.9 FM	Fargo, North Dakota
KRWM	106.9 FM	Bremerton, Washington
KRWN	92.5 FM	Farmington, New Mexico
KRWP	103.3 FM	Pampa, Texas
KRWQ	100.3 FM	Gold Hill, Oregon
KRWR	92.1 FM	Tyler, Texas
KRXB	107.1 FM	Beeville, Texas
KRXD	97.7 FM	McNary, Arizona
KRXF	92.9 FM	Bend, Oregon
KRXG	91.3 FM	Silver City, New Mexico
KRXL	94.5 FM	Kirksville, Missouri
KRXO-FM	107.7 FM	Oklahoma City, Oklahoma
KRXP	103.9 FM	Pueblo West, Colorado
KRXQ	98.5 FM	Sacramento, California
KRXT	98.5 FM	Rockdale, Texas
KRXV	98.1 FM	Yermo, California
KRXW	103.5 FM	Roseau, Minnesota
KRXY	94.5 FM	Shelton, Washington
KRYD	104.9 FM	Norwood, Colorado
KRYE	94.7 FM	Beulah, Colorado
KRYJ	89.7 FM	Craig, Colorado
KRYK	101.3 FM	Chinook, Montana
KRYL	106.5 FM	Haiku, Hawaii
KRYP	93.1 FM	Gladstone, Oregon
KRYS-FM	99.1 FM	Corpus Christi, Texas
KRZA	88.7 FM	Alamosa, Colorado
KRZK	106.3 FM	Branson, Missouri
KRZN	96.3 FM	Billings, Montana
KRZP	92.7 FM	Gassville, Arkansas
KRZQ	105.9 FM	Amargosa Valley, Nevada
KRZS	99.1 FM	Pangburn, Arkansas
KRZU	90.7 FM	Batesville, Texas
KRZX	106.1 FM	Redlands, Colorado
KRZY-FM	105.9 FM	Santa Fe, New Mexico
KRZZ	93.3 FM	San Francisco, California

== KS-- ==
Callsign	Frequency	City of license
KSAB	99.9 FM	Robstown, Texas
KSAC-FM	105.5 FM	Dunnigan, California
KSAG	103.3 FM	Pearsall, Texas
KSAH-FM	104.1 FM	Pearsall, Texas
KSAI	99.5 FM	Citrus Heights, California
KSAJ-FM	98.5 FM	Burlingame, Kansas
KSAK	90.1 FM	Walnut, California
KSAL-FM	104.9 FM	Salina, Kansas
KSAM-FM	101.7 FM	Huntsville, Texas
KSAN	107.7 FM	San Mateo, California
KSAO	93.9 FM	San Angelo, Texas
KSAQ	102.3 FM	Charlotte, Texas
KSAR	92.3 FM	Thayer, Missouri
KSAS-FM	103.5 FM	Caldwell, Idaho
KSAY	88.5 FM	Hamlin, Texas
KSBA	88.5 FM	Coos Bay, Oregon
KSBC	88.3 FM	Nile, Washington
KSBH	94.9 FM	Coushatta, Louisiana
KSBJ	89.3 FM	Humble, Texas
KSBK	100.3 FM	Blanca, Colorado
KSBL	101.7 FM	Carpinteria, California
KSBR	88.5 FM	Mission Viejo, California
KSBS-FM	92.1 FM	Pago Pago, American Samoa
KSBU	92.7 FM	Delta, Louisiana
KSBV	93.7 FM	Salida, Colorado
KSBZ	103.1 FM	Sitka, Alaska
KSCA	101.9 FM	Glendale, California
KSCB-FM	107.5 FM	Liberal, Kansas
KSCH	95.9 FM	Sulphur Springs, Texas
KSCL	91.3 FM	Shreveport, Louisiana
KSCM	94.3 FM	Scammon Bay, Alaska
KSCN	96.9 FM	Pittsburg, Texas
KSCQ	92.9 FM	Silver City, New Mexico
KSCR-FM	93.5 FM	Benson, Minnesota
KSCS	96.3 FM	Fort Worth, Texas
KSCU	103.3 FM	Santa Clara, California
KSCV	90.1 FM	Springfield, Missouri
KSCY	106.9 FM	Four Corners, Montana
KSD	93.7 FM	St. Louis, Missouri
KSDA-FM	91.9 FM	Agat, Guam
KSDB-FM	91.9 FM	Manhattan, Kansas
KSDJ	90.7 FM	Brookings, South Dakota
KSDL	92.3 FM	Sedalia, Missouri
KSDM	104.1 FM	International Falls, Minnesota
KSDN-FM	94.1 FM	Aberdeen, South Dakota
KSDQ	88.7 FM	Moberly, Missouri
KSDR-FM	92.9 FM	Watertown, South Dakota
KSDS	88.3 FM	San Diego, California
KSDW	88.9 FM	Temecula, California
KSDZ	95.5 FM	Gordon, Nebraska
KSEA	107.9 FM	Greenfield, California
KSEC	95.7 FM	Bentonville, Arkansas
KSED	107.5 FM	Sedona, Arizona
KSEF	88.9 FM	Ste. Genevieve, Missouri
KSEG	96.9 FM	Sacramento, California
KSEH	94.5 FM	Brawley, California
KSEK-FM	99.1 FM	Girard, Kansas
KSEL-FM	105.9 FM	Portales, New Mexico
KSEM	106.3 FM	Seminole, Texas
KSEQ	97.1 FM	Visalia, California
KSER	90.7 FM	Everett, Washington
KSES-FM	107.1 FM	Seaside, California
KSEY-FM	94.3 FM	Seymour, Texas
KSEZ	97.9 FM	Sioux City, Iowa
KSFC	91.9 FM	Spokane, Washington
KSFE	96.7 FM	Grants, New Mexico
KSFI	100.3 FM	Salt Lake City, Utah
KSFM	102.5 FM	Woodland, California
KSFR	101.1 FM	White Rock, New Mexico
KSFS	90.1 FM	Sioux Falls, South Dakota
KSFT-FM	107.1 FM	South Sioux City, Nebraska
KSGF-FM	104.1 FM	Ash Grove, Missouri
KSGG	104.7 FM	Soledad, California
KSGN	89.7 FM	Riverside, California
KSGR	91.1 FM	Portland, Texas
KSGZ	98.7 FM	Greenfield, California
KSHA	104.3 FM	Redding, California
KSHE	94.7 FM	Crestwood, Missouri
KSHI	90.9 FM	Zuni, New Mexico
KSHK	103.1 FM	Hanamaulu, Hawaii
KSHL	97.5 FM	Lincoln Beach, Oregon
KSHM	91.3 FM	Show Low, Arizona
KSHQ	100.7 FM	Deerfield, Missouri
KSHR-FM	97.3 FM	Coquille, Oregon
KSHU	90.5 FM	Huntsville, Texas
KSIB-FM	101.3 FM	Creston, Iowa
KSID-FM	98.7 FM	Sidney, Nebraska
KSIF	91.7 FM	Wellington, Texas
KSII	93.1 FM	El Paso, Texas
KSIL	107.1 FM	Rincon, New Mexico
KSIT	99.7 FM	Rock Springs, Wyoming
KSIV-FM	91.5 FM	St. Louis, Missouri
KSJD	91.5 FM	Cortez, Colorado
KSJE	90.9 FM	Farmington, New Mexico
KSJI	91.1 FM	St. Joseph, Missouri
KSJJ	102.9 FM	Redmond, Oregon
KSJM	89.1 FM	St. James, Minnesota
KSJN	99.5 FM	Minneapolis, Minnesota
KSJO	92.3 FM	San Jose, California
KSJP	88.9 FM	Ipswich, South Dakota
KSJQ	92.7 FM	Savannah, Missouri
KSJR-FM	90.1 FM	Collegeville, Minnesota
KSJS	90.5 FM	San Jose, California
KSJT-FM	107.5 FM	San Angelo, Texas
KSJV	91.5 FM	Fresno, California
KSJY	89.9 FM	Saint Martinville, Louisiana
KSJZ	93.3 FM	Jamestown, North Dakota
KSKA	91.1 FM	Anchorage, Alaska
KSKB	99.1 FM	Brooklyn, Iowa
KSKC	89.5 FM	Crooked Creek, Alaska
KSKE-FM	101.7 FM	Eagle, Colorado
KSKF	90.9 FM	Klamath Falls, Oregon
KSKG	99.9 FM	Salina, Kansas
KSKI-FM	94.5 FM	Sun Valley, Idaho
KSKL	94.5 FM	Scott City, Kansas
KSKO-FM	89.5 FM	McGrath, Alaska
KSKP	89.5 FM	Sleetmute, Alaska
KSKQ	89.5 FM	Ashland, Oregon
KSKR-FM	100.9 FM	Sutherlin, Oregon
KSKS	93.7 FM	Fresno, California
KSKU	94.7 FM	Sterling, Kansas
KSKZ	98.1 FM	Copeland, Kansas
KSL-FM	102.7 FM	Midvale, Utah
KSLC	90.3 FM	McMinnville, Oregon
KSLE	104.7 FM	Wewoka, Oklahoma
KSLG-FM	93.1 FM	Arcata, California
KSLK	101.7 FM	Selawik, Alaska
KSLO-FM	105.3 FM	Simmesport, Louisiana
KSLP	90.3 FM	Fort Pierre, South Dakota
KSLQ-FM	104.5 FM	Washington, Missouri
KSLS	90.7 FM	Dickinson, North Dakota
KSLT	107.1 FM	Spearfish, South Dakota
KSLU	90.9 FM	Hammond, Louisiana
KSLV-FM	96.5 FM	Del Norte, Colorado
KSLX-FM	100.7 FM	Scottsdale, Arizona
KSLY	96.1 FM	San Luis Obispo, California
KSLZ	107.7 FM	St. Louis, Missouri
KSMA-FM	98.7 FM	Osage, Iowa
KSMB	94.5 FM	Lafayette, Louisiana
KSMC	89.5 FM	Moraga, California
KSME	96.1 FM	Greeley, Colorado
KSMF	89.1 FM	Ashland, Oregon
KSMG	105.3 FM	Seguin, Texas
KSML-FM	101.9 FM	Huntington, Texas
KSMM-FM	101.5 FM	Liberal, Kansas
KSMR	92.5 FM	Winona, Minnesota
KSMS-FM	90.5 FM	Point Lookout, Missouri
KSMT	102.1 FM	Breckenridge, Colorado
KSMU	91.1 FM	Springfield, Missouri
KSMW	90.3 FM	West Plains, Missouri
KSMX-FM	107.5 FM	Clovis, New Mexico
KSMY	106.7 FM	Lompoc, California
KSNA	100.7 FM	Idaho Falls, Idaho
KSNB	91.5 FM	Norton, Kansas
KSND	95.1 FM	Monmouth, Oregon
KSNE-FM	106.5 FM	Las Vegas, Nevada
KSNH	88.5 FM	Snowflake, Arizona
KSNI-FM	102.5 FM	Santa Maria, California
KSNM	98.7 FM	Truth or Consequences, New Mexico
KSNN	103.7 FM	Ridgway, Colorado
KSNO-FM	103.9 FM	Snowmass Village, Colorado
KSNP	97.7 FM	Burlington, Kansas
KSNQ	98.3 FM	Twin Falls, Idaho
KSNR	100.3 FM	Fisher, Minnesota
KSNS	91.5 FM	Medicine Lodge, Kansas
KSNX	105.5 FM	Heber, Arizona
KSNY-FM	101.5 FM	Snyder, Texas
KSNZ	92.9 FM	Shamrock, Texas
KSOC	94.5 FM	Tipton, Oklahoma
KSOF	98.9 FM	Dinuba, California
KSOH	89.5 FM	Wapato, Washington
KSOI	91.9 FM	Murray, Iowa
KSOK-FM	95.9 FM	Winfield, Kansas
KSOL	98.9 FM	San Francisco, California
KSOM	96.5 FM	Audubon, Iowa
KSON	103.7 FM	San Diego, California
KSOO-FM	99.1 FM	Lennox, South Dakota
KSOP-FM	104.3 FM	Salt Lake City, Utah
KSOR	90.1 FM	Ashland, Oregon
KSOS	90.5 FM	Las Vegas, Nevada
KSOU-FM	93.9 FM	Sioux Center, Iowa
KSPB	91.9 FM	Pebble Beach, California
KSPF	98.7 FM	Dallas, Texas
KSPC	88.7 FM	Claremont, California
KSPE	94.5 FM	Ellwood, California
KSPH	92.9 FM	Springhill, Louisiana
KSPI-FM	93.7 FM	Stillwater, Oklahoma
KSPK-FM	102.3 FM	Walsenburg, Colorado
KSPL	90.9 FM	Kalispell, Montana
KSPN-FM	103.1 FM	Aspen, Colorado
KSPP	89.1 FM	Rhinelander, Wisconsin
KSPQ	93.9 FM	West Plains, Missouri
KSPW	96.5 FM	Sparta, Missouri
KSQD	90.7 FM	Santa Cruz, California
KSQL	99.1 FM	Santa Cruz, California
KSQM	91.5 FM	Sequim, Washington
KSQQ	96.1 FM	Morgan Hill, California
KSQS	91.7 FM	Ririe, Idaho
KSQT	89.7 FM	Prunedale, California
KSQX	89.1 FM	Springtown, Texas
KSQY	95.1 FM	Deadwood, South Dakota
KSRA-FM	92.7 FM	Salmon, Idaho
KSRD	91.9 FM	St. Joseph, Missouri
KSRF	95.9 FM	Poipu, Hawaii
KSRG	88.3 FM	Ashland, Oregon
KSRH	88.1 FM	San Rafael, California
KSRI	90.7 FM	Sterling, Colorado
KSRN	107.7 FM	Kings Beach, California
KSRP	89.1 FM	Dodge City, Kansas
KSRQ	90.1 FM	Thief River Falls, Minnesota
KSRS	91.5 FM	Roseburg, Oregon
KSRT	107.1 FM	Cloverdale, California
KSRV-FM	96.1 FM	Ontario, Oregon
KSRW	92.5 FM	Independence, California
KSRX	97.5 FM	Sterling, Colorado
KSRY	103.1 FM	Tehachapi, California
KSRZ	104.5 FM	Omaha, Nebraska
KSSA	105.9 FM	Ingalls, Kansas
KSSB	96.3 FM	Calipatria, California
KSSC	107.1 FM	Ventura, California
KSSD	107.1 FM	Fallbrook, California
KSSE	107.1 FM	Arcadia, California
KSSH	91.7 FM	Shubert, Nebraska
KSSI	102.1 FM	China Lake, California
KSSK-FM	92.3 FM	Waipahu, Hawaii
KSSL	107.3 FM	Post, Texas
KSSM	103.1 FM	Copperas Cove, Texas
KSSN	95.7 FM	Little Rock, Arkansas
KSSO	89.3 FM	Norman, Oklahoma
KSSR-FM	95.9 FM	Santa Rosa, New Mexico
KSSS	101.5 FM	Bismarck, North Dakota
KSSU	91.9 FM	Durant, Oklahoma
KSSW	96.9 FM	Nashville, Arkansas
KSSX	95.7 FM	Carlsbad, California
KSSZ	93.9 FM	Fayette, Missouri
KSTH	92.3 FM	Holyoke, Colorado
KSTI	102.1 FM	Port Angeles, Washington
KSTJ	91.3 FM	Hartford, South Dakota
KSTK	101.7 FM	Wrangell, Alaska
KSTM	88.9 FM	Indianola, Iowa
KSTO	95.5 FM	Agana, Guam
KSTP-FM	94.5 FM	Saint Paul, Minnesota
KSTQ	93.5	Stuart, Oklahoma
KSTR-FM	96.1 FM	Montrose, Colorado
KSTT-FM	104.5 FM	Atascadero, California
KSTV-FM	93.1 FM	Dublin, Texas
KSTX	89.1 FM	San Antonio, Texas
KSTY	104.5 FM	Canon City, Colorado
KSTZ	102.5 FM	Des Moines, Iowa
KSUA	91.5 FM	Fairbanks, Alaska
KSUG	101.9 FM	Heber Springs, Arkansas
KSUI	91.7 FM	Iowa City, Iowa
KSUP	106.3 FM	Juneau, Alaska
KSUT	91.3 FM	Ignacio, Colorado
KSUU	91.1 FM	Cedar City, Utah
KSUW	91.3 FM	Sheridan, Wyoming
KSUX	105.7 FM	Winnebago, Nebraska
KSVL	92.3 FM	Smith, Nevada
KSVQ	89.3 FM	Gambell, Alaska
KSVR	91.7 FM	Mount Vernon, Washington
KSVU	90.1 FM	Hamilton, Washington
KSVY	91.3 FM	Sonoma, California
KSWD	94.1 FM	Seattle, Washington
KSWF	100.5 FM	Aurora, Missouri
KSWG	96.3 FM	Wickenburg, Arizona
KSWI	95.7 FM	Atlantic, Iowa
KSWJ	90.9 FM	Alexandria, Minnesota
KSWN	93.9 FM	McCook, Nebraska
KSWP	90.9 FM	Lufkin, Texas
KSWS	88.9 FM	Chehalis, Washington
KSWW	102.1 FM	Ocean Shores, Washington
KSXT	90.3 FM	Smiley, Texas
KSXY	100.9 FM	Forestville, California
KSYC-FM	103.9 FM	Yreka, California
KSYD	92.1 FM	Reedsport, Oregon
KSYF	107.5 FM	Olathe, Colorado
KSYM-FM	90.1 FM	San Antonio, Texas
KSYN	92.5 FM	Joplin, Missouri
KSYU	98.1 FM	Saint Marys, Alaska
KSYV	96.7 FM	Solvang, California
KSYZ-FM	107.7 FM	Grand Island, Nebraska
KSZR	97.5 FM	Oro Valley, Arizona
KSZX	105.5 FM	Santa Anna, Texas

== See also ==
- North American call sign
