= 90.1 FM =

FM radio frequency

The following radio stations broadcast on FM frequency 90.1 MHz:

== Argentina ==
- FM La Boca in Buenos Aires
- Keops in La Plata, Buenos Aires
- LRS761 in Casilda, Santa Fe
- Mega 90.1 in Mar del Plata, Buenos Aires
- Radio 2 in Rosario, Santa Fe
- Radio María in Carhué, Buenos Aires
- Radio María in Sampacho, Córdoba
- Radio María in Pico Truncado, Santa Cruz
- Radio María in San Juan
- Radio Sur in Córdoba

== Australia ==
- 2NBC in Sydney, New South Wales
- Radio National in Gold Coast, Queensland
- 4RBZ in Stanthorpe, Queensland
- TOTE Sport Radio in Launceston, Tasmania

== Canada (Channel 211) ==
- CBBS-FM in Sudbury, Ontario
- CBCX-FM-1 in Edmonton, Alberta
- CBFX-FM-5 in Gaspe, Quebec
- CBIB-FM in Bay St. Lawrence, Nova Scotia
- CBQI-FM in Atikokan, Ontario
- CBTL-FM in Millertown, Newfoundland and Labrador
- CBUA-FM in Atlin, British Columbia
- CBV-FM-8 in Thetford-Mines, Quebec
- CFBL-FM in Bearskin Lake, Ontario
- CFBY-FM in Poplar Hill, Ontario
- CFEY-FM in Sachigo Lake, Ontario
- CFJU-FM in Kedgwick, New Brunswick
- CFKL-FM in Kingfisher Lake, Ontario
- CFKP-FM in Kasabonika Lake, Ontario
- CFLR-FM in La Romaine, Quebec
- CFNP-FM in Naicatchewenin, Ontario
- CFNS-FM in Fort Lawrence, Nova Scotia
- CFOG-FM in Luscar, Alberta
- CHBJ-FM in Slate Falls, Ontario
- CHMZ-FM in Tofino, British Columbia
- CHPM-FM in Wunnummin Lake, Ontario
- CHWL-FM in Weagamow Lake, Ontario
- CIBE-FM in St-Augustin, Quebec
- CIFM-FM-9 in Sun Peaks, British Columbia
- CIRM-FM in Moncton, New Brunswick
- CITN-FM in Nain, Newfoundland and Labrador
- CJLF-FM-1 in Owen Sound, Ontario
- CJMP-FM in Powell River, British Columbia
- CJSF-FM in Burnaby, British Columbia
- CKAS-FM in Kashechewan, Ontario
- CKAU-FM-1 in Sept-Iles, Quebec
- CKDL-FM in Deer Lake, Ontario
- CKFA-FM in Fort Albany, Ontario
- CKFS-FM in Fort Severn, Ontario
- CKPN-FM in Webequie, Ontario
- CKSF-FM in Prince Albert, Saskatchewan
- VF2308 in Greenhills Mine Site, British Columbia
- VF2408 in Sunshine Valley, British Columbia
- VF2427 in Spences Bridge, British Columbia
- VF8007 in Acton Vale, Quebec
- VF8016 in St. Thomas, Ontario

== China ==
- CNR Kazakh Radio in Xinjiang
- CRI Hit FM in Xiamen (formerly News Radio before July 2017, stopped airing in May 2018)
- CRI News Radio in Hefei (stopped airing in August 2020)
- Radio Foshan Shunde People's Broadcasting Station in Shunde, Foshan

== Japan ==
- JOTR-FM in Akita, Akita
- SBS Radio in Mishima, Shizuoka
- NHK Radio 1 in Hiroo, Hokkaido

== Malaysia ==
- Hot FM in Johor Bahru, Johor and Singapore
- Sandakan FM in Sandakan, Sabah
- TraXX FM in Ipoh, Perak

== Mexico ==
- XHAH-FM in Juchitán de Zaragoza, Oaxaca
- XHCHL-FM in Los Ramones, Nuevo León
- XHCHT-FM in Chalcatongo de Hidalgo, Oaxaca
- XHENO-FM in Metepec, Estado de México
- XHGNS-FM in Guerrero Negro, Baja California Sur
- XHGYS-FM in Guaymas, Sonora
- XHHIL-FM in Benjamin Hill, Sonora
- XHLCE-FM in La Cruz, Sinaloa
- XHLL-FM in Boca del Río, Veracruz
- XHLQ-FM in Morelia, Michoacán
- XHMIL-FM in Los Mochis, Sinaloa
- XHMU-FM in Tampico, Tamaulipas
- XHNQ-FM in Tulancingo (Singuilucan), Hidalgo
- XHPECA-FM in Pláxedis G Guerrero, Chihuahua
- XHPSJI-FM in San José Iturbide, Guanajuato
- XHQW-FM in Mérida, Yucatán
- XHRS-FM in Puebla, Puebla
- XHRYS-FM in Reynosa, Tamaulipas
- XHSAT-FM in Villahermosa, Tabasco
- XHSCEL-FM in Peribán, Michoacán
- XHSMR-FM in Villa de Pozos, San Luis Potosí
- XHTGO-FM in Tlaltenango (Guadalupe Victoria), Zacatecas
- XHTUJ-FM in Tuxpan, Jalisco
- XHUA-FM in Chihuahua, Chihuahua
- XHW-FM in La Paz, Baja California Sur

== New Zealand ==
- The Breeze in Otematata, Canterbury
- Coast in Sumner, Canterbury
- The Hits in Wellington
- Magic Talk in Westport
- More FM in Gisborne

== Philippines ==
- DYGG in Balamban, Cebu
- Juander Radyo in Iligan

== Taiwan ==
- Hit FM in Kaohsiung

== United States (Channel 211) ==
- KADU in Hibbing, Minnesota
- KAJC in Salem, Oregon
- KAMY in Lubbock, Texas
- KAXM in Nacogdoches, Texas
- KBCZ in Boulder Creek, California
- KBKC in Moberly, Missouri
- KBLW in Billings, Montana
- KBNV in Fayetteville, Arkansas
- KBSG in Raymond, Washington
- KCBX in San Luis Obispo, California
- KCDS-LP in Tucson, Arizona
- KCEI in Red River, New Mexico
- KCFR in Denver, Colorado
- KCVC in Cherry Valley, Arkansas
- KDNM in Reserve, New Mexico
- KEEA in Aberdeen, South Dakota
- KERA (FM) in Dallas, Texas
- KFJS in North Platte, Nebraska
- KHCC in Hutchinson, Kansas
- KHCO in Hayden, Colorado
- KHLV in Helena, Montana
- KHRV in Hood River, Oregon
- KHSF in Ferndale, California
- KILI in Porcupine, South Dakota
- KJZP in Prescott, Arizona
- KKFI in Kansas City, Missouri
- KLRD in Yucaipa, California
- KLRO in Hot Springs, Arkansas
- KNCH in San Angelo, Texas
- KNEF in Franklin, Nebraska
- KNIZ in Gallup, New Mexico
- KNMC in Havre, Montana
- KNSE in Austin, Minnesota
- KNWO in Cottonwood, Idaho
- KNWP in Port Angeles, Washington
- KOBN in Burns, Oregon
- KOCU in Altus, Oklahoma
- KOJB in Cass Lake, Minnesota
- KOLU in Pasco, Washington
- KPFT in Houston, Texas
- KPLI in Olympia, Washington
- KQMC in Hawthorne, Nevada
- KQWS in Omak, Washington
- KRHS in Overland, Missouri
- KRLU in Roswell, New Mexico
- KRMB in Bisbee, Arizona
- KSAK in Walnut, California
- KSCV (FM) in Springfield, Missouri
- KSFS in Sioux Falls, South Dakota
- KSJR in Collegeville, Minnesota
- KSOR in Ashland, Oregon
- KSRQ in Thief River Falls, Minnesota
- KSVU in Hamilton, Washington
- KSYM in San Antonio, Texas
- KTQX in Bakersfield, California
- KTUH in Honolulu, Hawaii
- KTXI in Ingram, Texas
- KUCO (FM) in Edmond, Oklahoma
- KUCO-HD2 in Edmond, Oklahoma
- KUER in Salt Lake City, Utah
- KUPS in Tacoma, Washington
- KUTE in Ignacio, Colorado
- KUWL in Laramie, Wyoming
- KUWP in Powell, Wyoming
- KVLQ in La Pine, Oregon
- KWFH in Parker, Arizona
- KXQJ in Clarksville, Texas
- KYAC in Mill City, Oregon
- KYBF in Scottsbluff, Nebraska
- KYCC in Stockton, California
- KYEJ in Fairmont, Minnesota
- KZFR in Chico, California
- KZLW in Gretna, Nebraska
- KZMU in Moab, Utah
- KZNK in Brewster, Kansas
- KZSU in Stanford, California
- WABE in Atlanta, Georgia
- WARV-FM in Colonial Heights, Virginia
- WAWJ in Marion, Illinois
- WBED in Bedford, Indiana
- WCAI in Woods Hole, Massachusetts
- WCCE in Buies Creek, North Carolina
- WCDV-FM in Trout Run, Pennsylvania
- WCSP in Washington, District of Columbia
- WDCE in Richmond, Virginia
- WDLG in Thomasville, Alabama
- WECS in Willimantic, Connecticut
- WEFT in Champaign, Illinois
- WEKP in Pineville, Kentucky
- WEPR in Greenville, South Carolina
- WFBV in Selinsgrove, Pennsylvania
- WFRU in Quincy, Florida
- WFYI in Indianapolis, Indiana
- WGCU in Fort Myers, Florida
- WGMC in Greece, New York
- WGPO in Grand Portage, Minnesota
- WGSK in South Kent, Connecticut
- WHBP in Harbor Springs, Michigan
- WHMC-FM in Conway, South Carolina
- WHRX in Nassawadox, Virginia
- WIFF (FM) in Binghamton, New York
- WITH (FM) in Ithaca, New York
- WIUP in Indiana, Pennsylvania
- WIVH in Christiansted, Virgin Islands
- WJCR in Upton, Kentucky
- WJDZ in Pastillo, Puerto Rico
- WJEE in Bolivar, Ohio
- WJKA in Jacksonville, North Carolina
- WJOU in Huntsville, Alabama
- WJSO in Pikeville, Kentucky
- WJUF in Inverness, Florida
- WKNP in Jackson, Tennessee
- WKTS in Kingston, Tennessee
- WKWV in Watertown, New York
- WKYP in Ledbetter, Kentucky
- WLLM-FM in Carlinville, Illinois
- WMBI in Chicago, Illinois
- WMBT-LP in Gainesville, Florida
- WMEA (FM) in Portland, Maine
- WMFU in Mount Hope, New York
- WMHQ in Malone, New York
- WMPR in Jackson, Mississippi
- WMVE in Chase City, Virginia
- WNAA in Greensboro, North Carolina
- WNMU in Marquette, Michigan
- WOHC in Chillicothe, Ohio
- WOI-FM in Ames, Iowa
- WORI in Delhi Hills, Ohio
- WORQ in Green Bay, Wisconsin
- WOUZ in Zanesville, Ohio
- WOVV in Ocracoke, North Carolina
- WOXM in Middlebury, Vermont
- WPGT in Lake City, Florida
- WPRR-FM in Clyde Township, Michigan
- WPSX (FM) in Kane, Pennsylvania
- WPUT (FM) in North Salem, New York
- WPVA in Waynesboro, Virginia
- WPWV in Princeton, West Virginia
- WRCU in Hamilton, New York
- WRTI in Philadelphia, Pennsylvania
- WRUV in Burlington, Vermont
- WRXC in Shelton, Connecticut
- WRYP in Wellfleet, Massachusetts
- WSDM in Wadesville, Indiana
- WTJT in Baker, Florida
- WUCX in Bay City, Michigan
- WUSB (FM) in Stony Brook, New York
- WVCS (FM) in Owen, Wisconsin
- WVMN in New Castle, Pennsylvania
- WVRS in Gore, Virginia
- WXML in Upper Sandusky, Ohio
- WXVS in Waycross, Georgia
- WYBA in Coldwater, Michigan
- WYHN in Washington, Indiana
- WYPW-LP in Brandon, Florida
- WYQQ in Charlton, Massachusetts
- WYXA in Clarksburg, West Virginia
- WZPE in Bath, North Carolina
- WZRU in Garysburg, North Carolina
- WZXN in Newburg, Pennsylvania
- WZYZ in Spencer, Tennessee
