= KSLV =

KSLV may refer to:

- KSLV-FM, a radio station (96.5 FM) licensed to Del Norte, Colorado, United States
- KBGV, a radio station (1240 AM) licensed to Monte Vista, Colorado, which held the call sign KSLV from 1954 to 2019
- KYDN, a radio station (95.3 FM) licensed to Monte Vista, Colorado, which held the call sign KSLV-FM from June 1984 to September 2008
- Series of designations for Korean Space Launch Vehicle
  - Naro-1 (KSLV-1)
  - Nuri (rocket) (KSLV-II)
- KSLV Noh, a Drift phonk Artist, best known by his track Disaster

== See also ==
- WSLV
- SLV (disambiguation)
