= KQKL =

KQKL may refer to:

- KQKL (FM), a radio station (95.3 FM) licensed to serve Keokuk, Iowa, United States
- KAWF, a radio station (88.5 FM) licensed to serve Selma, California, United States, which held the call sign KQKL from 2002 to 2019
- KIXW (AM), a radio station (960 AM) licensed to serve Apple Valley, California, which held the call sign KQKL from 1989 to 1991
