= KQBM =

KQBM may refer to:

- KQBM (FM), a radio station (90.7 FM) licensed to serve San Andreas, California, United States
- KQBM-LP, a low-power radio station (103.7 FM) licensed to serve West Point, California
