= WYPW =

WYPW may refer to:

- WYPW-LP, a low-power radio station (90.1 FM) licensed to serve Brandon, Florida, United States
- WRDI, a radio station (95.7 FM) licensed to serve Nappanee, Indiana, United States, which held the call sign WYPW from 2005 to 2010
