= CHMZ-FM =

Radio station in Tofino, British Columbia

Coordinates: 49°08′56″N 125°54′00″W

- Tofino, British Columbia; Canada
- Frequency: 90.1 MHz
- Branding: Tuff City Radio 90.1

Ownership
- Owner: 1193833 B.C. Ltd.; (CHMZ-FM Radio Ltd.)
- Sister stations: CIMM-FM

Technical information
- Class: A1
- ERP: 0.17 kW

Links
- Website: https://www.tuffcityradio.com

CHMZ-FM is a Canadian radio station that broadcasts at 90.1 FM in Tofino, British Columbia. It is rebroadcast via an Internet stream on 99.5 FM CIMM-FM in Ucluelet. Collectively, the stations are labelled as Tuff City Radio Programming targets regional news and events as well as a focus on emerging Canadian artists. Both stations are on-air twenty four hours a day, year round.

Currently the station has a daily morning show hosted by Tofino resident Cameron Dennison, as well as JJ Belanger. There are also a number of local, mostly volunteer hosts who provide themed programming. Tuff City Radio also imports some nationally syndicated programs and Vancouver Canucks hockey. Daily information programming includes local and national news and sports, tide reports, weather, driving conditions, marine weather and surf conditions.

CHMZ received approval in 2004 and signed on August 16, 2005.

In 2016, McBride Communications has dropped the Long Beach Radio simulcast on CHMZ-FM 90.1 Tofino and CIMM-FM 99.5 Ucluelet replacing it with local programming on both stations. CHMZ-FM is now known as TUFF CITY RADIO 90.1 and sister station CIMM-FM is now known as UKEE RADIO 99.5. Both stations have retained their Eclectic Rock & Variety formats.

== Sale of station and CRTC non-compliances ==
On February 28, 2020, the CRTC granted approval for the sale of CIMM-FM and CHMZ-FM to a third-party with the condition that both stations' licenses would be revoked on July 1, 2020, if the CRTC does not receive documented evidence that the sale of the radio stations has been completed by June 30, 2020.

Also, on February 28, 2020, the CRTC decided the fate of two other stations, which were the other radio stations also owned by Matthew G. McBride. The CRTC decided not to renew the broadcasting licenses for CKPM-FM and CFPV-FM, meaning that they would no longer be able to operate as of March 31, 2020. All four of these stations had been repeatedly found by the CRTC to be non-compliant.
