= CIMM-FM =

Radio station in Ucluelet, British Columbia

Coordinates: 48°56′24″N 125°32′47″W

- Ucluelet, British Columbia; Canada
- Frequency: 99.5 MHz
- Branding: Ukee Radio

Ownership
- Owner: McBride Communications

History
- First air date: September 1, 2006

Technical information
- Class: A1
- ERP: 0.18 kW

CIMM-FM is a Canadian radio station that broadcasts a community radio format at 99.5 FM in Ucluelet, western Vancouver Island, British Columbia. The station is branded as Ukee Radio (formerly Long Beach Radio). It serves the Long Beach area owned by McBride Communications.

A number of local, mostly volunteer hosts provide themed programming. CIMM-FM also airs some nationally syndicated programs and Vancouver Canucks hockey games. Daily information programming includes local and national news and sports, tide reports, weather, driving conditions, marine weather and surf conditions.

The station received approval on March 14, 2006, and began broadcasting on September 1, 2006. In 2016, McBride dropped the Long Beach Radio simulcast on CHMZ-FM 90.1 Tofino and CIMM-FM 99.5 Ucluelet, replacing it with local programming on both stations. Both stations have retained their eclectic rock & variety formats.

== Sale of Station and CRTC Non-Compliances ==
On February 28, 2020, the CRTC granted approval for the sale of CIMM-FM and CHMZ-FM to a third-party with the condition that both stations' licenses would be revoked on July 1, 2020, if the CRTC does not receive documented evidence that the sale of the radio stations has been completed by June 30, 2020.

Also, on February 28, 2020, the CRTC decided the fate of two other stations, which are the other radio stations also owned by Matthew G. McBride. The CRTC decided not to renew the broadcasting licenses for CKPM-FM and CFPV-FM, meaning that they would no longer be able to operate as of March 31, 2020. All four of these stations had been repeatedly found by the CRTC to be non-compliant.
