= WCRC =

WCRC may refer to:

- WCRC (AM), a former radio station in Virginia, United States now known as WDCE
- WCRC (FM), a radio station in Illinois, United States
- West Coast Railways, a train company in England
- World Communion of Reformed Churches, an international association of Reformed Calvinist churches
- Woodwell Climate Research Center, Massachusetts, United States
