= UCentral =

Student media network at the University of Central Oklahoma

UCentral Student Media Network
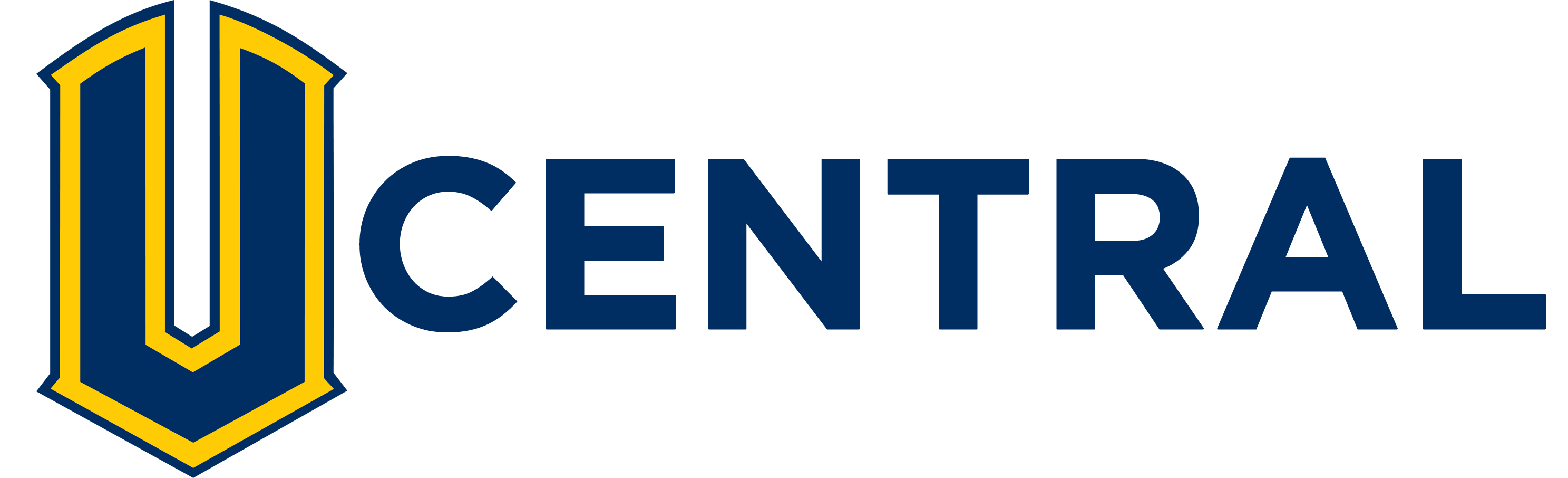
- Edmond, Oklahoma
- Slogan: UCO’s Student Media
- Founded: April 2007
- University: University of Central Oklahoma
- Television: UCentral TV
- Channel: Digital:125 (Cox Cable)
- Newspaper: The Vista
- Distributed: Tuesdays at UCO
- Radio: UCentral Radio
- Frequency: 99.3 FM (Edmond)
- Web/Social Media: @ucentralmedia @theVista1903 @ucentralradio
- Website: www.ucentralmedia.com

UCentral is the student media network at the University of Central Oklahoma, featuring traditional media and new media created by students majoring in professional media. UCentral Radio, Ucentral News, and the Vista fall under the umbrella of the UCentral Student Media Network.

UCentral is located within the Department of Mass Communication at the University of Central Oklahoma.

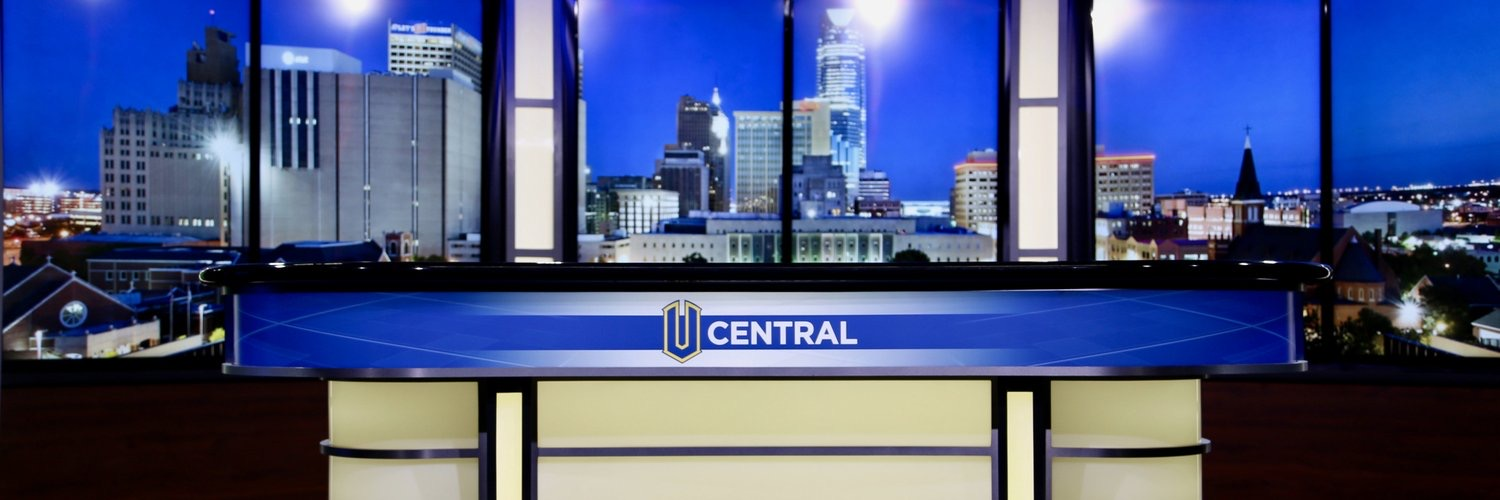

== TV and Netcasts ==
UCentral features several HDTV and netcast programs such as UCentral News, produced by broadcast-news students, and "Above The Fold", which is produced by the Vista Staff.

=== TV and Netcast History ===
Starting in 1976 as KCSU-TV, UCentral has featured several programs such as UCentral News, the daily student newscast; The Huddle, a weekly football highlight program during the fall; Conspiracy Weekly, an in-depth look at untold truths; Cup of Joe Quiz Show, a light-hearted, trivia-based game show with a prize; and TBSR, a focus on UCO players during the spring semester. The newscast is still being produced, but the netcasts previously listed have been retired. Students are encouraged every semester to write and produce new netcasts as part of their curriculum.

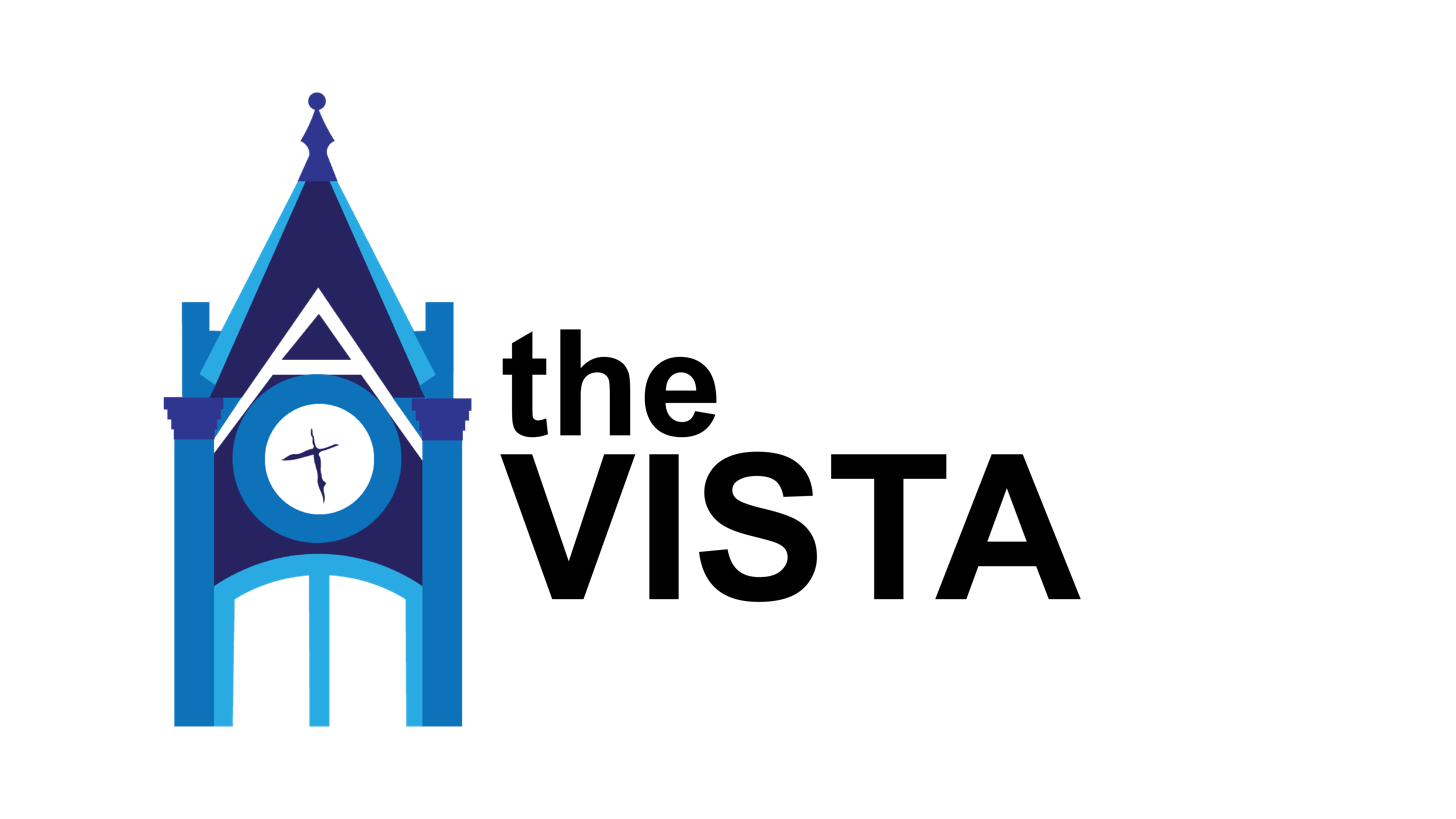

== Newspaper ==
The Vista, established in 1903 as the student newspaper of the University of Central Oklahoma, is the longest, continually published student newspaper in the state of Oklahoma. Distributed weekly free of charge on the UCO campus, The Vista serves as an integral part of the journalism experience and education of Mass Communication Department students. The Vista, published as an independent student publication, serves as a news and information source and public forum for the UCO community. Current stories are updated daily on social media and ucentralmedia.com, in addition to past issues of the paper available in The Vista Archives section at ucentralmedia.com.

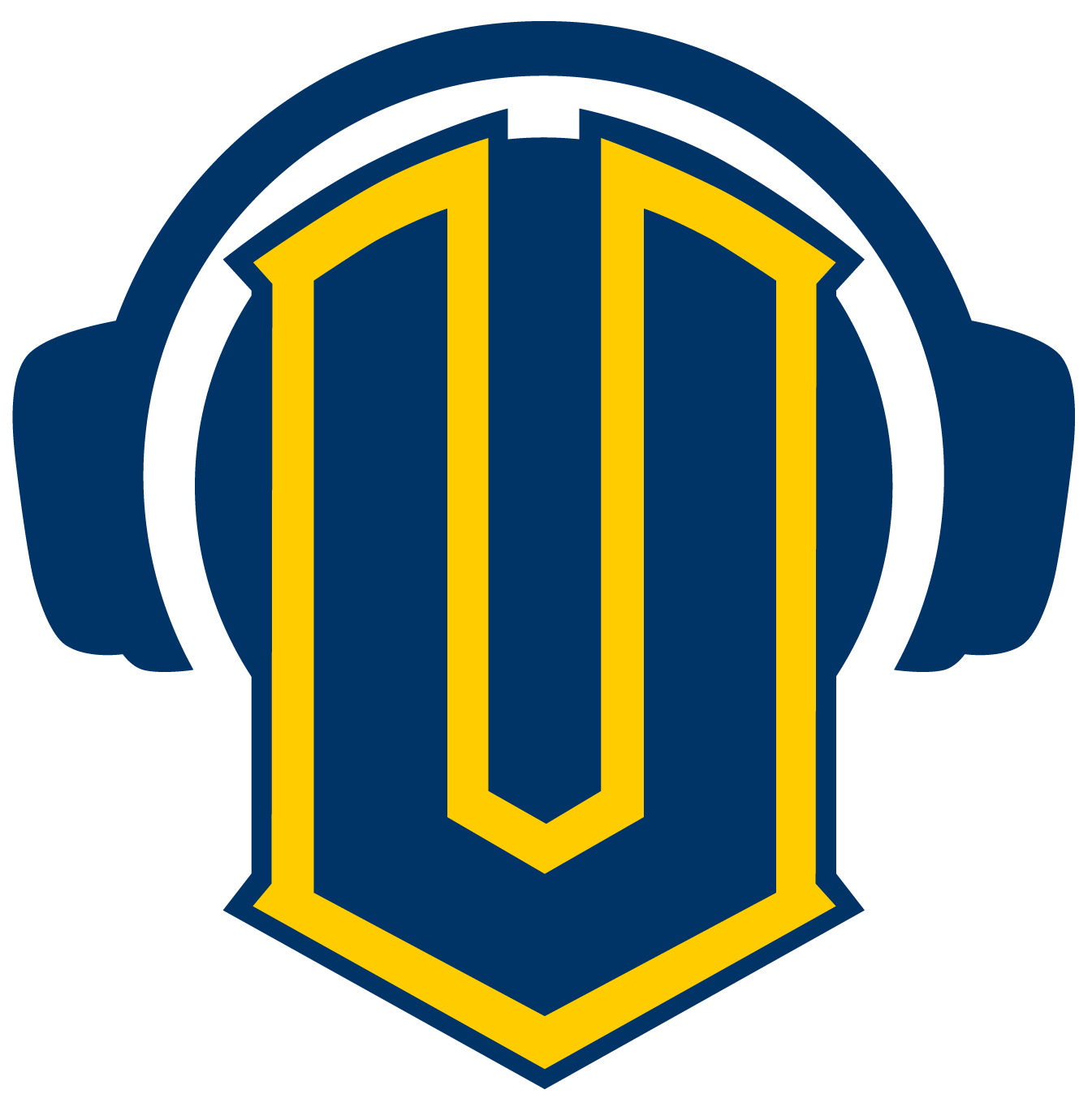

== Radio ==
UCentral Radio is the student radio station in Edmond, Oklahoma, on the campus of The University of Central Oklahoma. UCentral Radio applied for an LPFM license in November 2013 and was awarded a Construction Permit by FCC for 99.3 FM on February 24, 2015. It reserved the call letters KZUC.

=== Station History ===
A previous radio entity (from 1966 until 2014) at the university was KCSC, its call letters stemming from the university's former name, Central State College. In 2014, the call letters were changed to KUCO to reflect the university's (relatively) new name. The station serves now as a full-time classical music station.
