= KUCO =

KUCO may refer to:

- KUCO (FM), a radio station (90.1 FM) licensed to Edmond, Oklahoma, United States
- KUCO-LD, a television station (channel 27) licensed to Chico, California, United States
- Juraj Kucka, Slovak footballer, nicknamed "Kuco"
