= WPGT =

WPGT may refer to:

- WPGT (FM), a radio station (90.1 FM) licensed to serve Lake City, Florida, United States
- WVRP, a radio station (91.1 FM) licensed to serve Roanoke Rapids, North Carolina, United States, which held the call sign WPGT from 1999 to 2010
