= KSVR =

KSVR may refer to:

- KSVR (FM), a radio station (91.7 FM) licensed to Mount Vernon, Washington, United States
- K.S.V. Roeselare, a Belgian football club, from the city of Roeselare in West Flanders
