= KSVU =

- Hamilton, Washington; United States
- Frequency: 90.1 MHz
- Branding: Eastern Skagit County Community Radio

Programming
- Format: Variety
- Affiliations: KSVR

Ownership
- Owner: Skagit Valley College Board of Trustees

Technical information
- Licensing authority: FCC
- Facility ID: 174175
- Class: A
- ERP: 330 watts
- HAAT: −159 meters (−522 ft)
- Transmitter coordinates: 48°33′16″N 121°47′40″W

Links
- Public license information: Public file; LMS
- Webcast: Listen Live
- Website: ksvu.org

KSVU (90.1 FM) is an American community radio station broadcasting a variety format. Licensed to broadcast from Hamilton, Washington, United States, the station serves the Skagit Valley from Sedro Woolley to eastern Skagit County; the station is currently owned by the Board of Trustees of Skagit Valley College and is a sister-station of KSVR FM. The station started broadcasting in November 2011 from its studio located in Concrete, Washington. KSVU broadcasts from studios located in Concrete, Washington and is staffed by local volunteers and paid staff from Skagit Valley College.

== Programming ==
KSVU offers a variety of music and informational programming, some of which are broadcast in conjunction with its sister-station, KSVR. The station also offers selected programming from NPR, including The Diane Rehm Show.
