= Ukee =

Ukee may refer to:

- Ukee, a local short name for the town of Ucluelet, Vancouver Island, British Columbia, Canada
  - Ukee Radio, CIMM-FM, a local radio station
- Ukee Washington (born 1958), American TV news anchor
