= KSSR =

KSSR may refer to:

- Kazakh Soviet Socialist Republic, now Kazakhstan
- Kirghiz Soviet Socialist Republic, now Kyrgyzstan
- KSSR-FM, a radio station (95.9 FM) licensed to Santa Rosa, New Mexico, United States
- KSSR (AM), a defunct radio station (1340 AM) licensed to Santa Rosa, New Mexico, United States

== See also ==
- Crimean Socialist Soviet Republic (КССР)
