= KZJZ =

KZJZ may refer to:

- KZJZ (FM), a radio station (106.7 FM) licensed to serve Babbitt, Minnesota, United States
- KQEZ, a radio station (99.1 FM) licensed to serve St. Regis, Montana, United States, which held the call sign KZJZ from 2008 to 2018
- KHPT, a radio station (106.9 FM) licensed to serve Conroe, Texas, United States, which held the call sign KZJZ in 2000
- KXFN, a radio station (1380 AM) licensed to serve St. Louis, Missouri, United States, which held the call sign KZJZ from 1998 to 1999
