= XHW-FM =

Radio station in La Paz, Baja California Sur, Mexico

- La Paz, Baja California Sur; Mexico
- Broadcast area: La Paz, Baja California Sur
- Frequency: 90.1 FM
- Branding: Alegría Mexicana

Programming
- Format: Regional Mexican
- Affiliations: Radiorama

Ownership
- Owner: Promomedios California; (Radio La Paz, S.A.)

History
- First air date: April 23, 1964 (concession)

Technical information
- Licensing authority: CRT
- Class: B1
- ERP: 9.787 kW
- HAAT: 103.1 meters (338 ft)
- Transmitter coordinates: 24°07′51.3″N 110°16′39.5″W

Links
- Webcast: Listen live
- Website: alegriamexicana.com

XHW-FM is a music radio station branded as Alegría Mexicana in La Paz, Baja California Sur, Mexico. It is owned by the Raúl Arechiga Espinoza interests.

== History ==
XHW received its concession on April 23, 1964, making it the first FM radio station in Baja California Sur. It broadcast with 250 watts and was owned by Radio La Paz, S.A., a company controlled by BCS radio and television pioneer Francisco King Rondero. By 1986, it broadcast with 880 watts.

In the 1980s, XHW was sold to Promomedios California, the radio group of the Raúl Arechiga Espinoza interests.
