= XHLCE-FM =

Radio station in La Cruz, Elota, Sinaloa, Mexico

- La Cruz, Sinaloa; Mexico
- Frequency: 90.1 FM
- Branding: Óscar

Programming
- Format: Spanish classic hits

Ownership
- Owner: GPM Grupo Promomedios; (Radio Agricultores del Valle de Sinaloa, A.C.)

History
- First air date: May 11, 2017
- Call sign meaning: La Cruz Elota

Technical information
- Licensing authority: CRT
- Class: A
- ERP: 3 kW
- HAAT: 3.6 m (12 ft)

Links
- Webcast: Listen live
- Website: gpmtuportal.com

XHLCE-FM is a noncommercial (social) radio station on 90.1 FM in La Cruz, Sinaloa, Mexico under the name "Óscar". It is owned by Radio Agricultores del Valle de Sinaloa, A.C. and operated by GPM Grupo Promomedios, which also owns the local cable system in La Cruz.

== History ==
XHLCE went on air May 11, 2017, after receiving its concession the year before. Within a year, it ditched its original name "Yess FM" and became "Óscar".
