= XHENO-FM =

Radio station in Toluca, State of Mexico

- Santa María Ocotitlán, Metepec, State of Mexico; Mexico
- Broadcast area: Toluca, State of Mexico
- Frequency: 90.1 MHz
- Branding: Mix

Programming
- Format: Adult hits

Ownership
- Owner: Grupo ACIR; (Radio XHENO, S.A. de C.V.)

History
- First air date: November 23, 1994 (concession)
- Call sign meaning: TENangO de Arista

Technical information
- Class: B
- ERP: 29,760 watts

Links
- Website: mix901.mx

XHENO-FM is a radio station in Toluca, State of Mexico. Broadcasting on 90.1 FM, XHENO is owned by Grupo ACIR and carries its Mix adult hits format.

== History ==
XHENO received its concession on November 23, 1994. It was intended to be located in Tenango de Arista and owned by José Ignacio Pichardo Lechuga. XHENO was sold to ACIR in 1998.
