= XHGYS-FM =

Radio station in Guaymas, Sonora

- Guaymas, Sonora; Mexico
- Frequency: 90.1 FM
- Branding: La Que Manda

Programming
- Format: Grupera

Ownership
- Owner: Radiovisa; (XEGYS, S.A. de C.V.)

History
- First air date: July 13, 1994 (concession)
- Call sign meaning: GuaYmaS

Technical information
- Licensing authority: CRT
- Class: B
- ERP: 4.53 kW
- HAAT: 321.6 m (1,055 ft)
- Transmitter coordinates: 27°56′51″N 110°54′00″W

Links
- Website: radio.radiovisa.tv

XHGYS-FM is a radio station in Guaymas, Sonora. Broadcasting on 90.1 FM, XHGYS is owned by Radiovisa and carries a grupera format.

== History ==
XEGYS-AM 1040 received its concession on July 13, 1994. It was owned by Radio Unido, S.A., a Radiorama subsidiary and broadcast with 1 kW of daytime power. It migrated to FM in 2011. In 2012, the shares of the station were transferred to the Carrizales Luna family which owns Radiovisa.
