= Samoa Technologies =

Samoa Technologies, Inc.
- Company type: Privately held
- Industry: Telecommunications, Radio Broadcasting, Aircraft Leasing
- Founded: American Samoa, 1984
- Headquarters: Pago Pago, American Samoa
- Number of employees: 52
- Website: www.samoatechnologies.net

Samoa Technologies (also known as Samoa Tech or STI) is a privately held diversified telecommunications, broadcasting and media, consulting, and aircraft leasing company located in the South Pacific and based in Pago Pago, American Samoa. STI operates a Satellite Earth Station in American Samoa which provides 24/7 linkage to/from the outside world for voice, data and video; radio broadcasting station KSBS-FM; and mobile communications in American Samoa.

STI was formed in August 1984 as Samoa's first local telecommunications common carrier. The company started by providing mobile and paging communication services in American Samoa in 1995, reaching a subscriber base of over 3,000 users in the first 3 months of operations. STI expanded into the radio broadcasting area in 1998 with KSBS-FM "Island 92", Samoa's first FM radio station. In 1989, STI acquired the assets and licenses of the Pago Pago Earth Station facilities from COMSAT, a satellite communications company owned by Lockheed Martin. Under an FCC ruling, COMSAT was obligated to divest its satellite facilities. Since STI was the only local FCC common carrier at the time, the sale of the facilities to STI was of mutual benefit to both parties, satisfying an FCC divestiture requirement.
