= XHGNS-FM =

Radio station in Guerrero Negro, Baja California Sur

- Guerrero Negro, Baja California Sur; Mexico
- Frequency: 90.1 FM

Ownership
- Owner: María Teresa Arechiga Espinoza

History
- First air date: September 27, 1993 (concession)
- Call sign meaning: Guerrero Negro BCS

Technical information
- Licensing authority: CRT
- Class: A
- ERP: 1.964 kW
- HAAT: 36.3 m (119 ft)

XHGNS-FM is a radio station on 90.1 FM in Guerrero Negro, Baja California Sur.

== History ==
XHGNS received its concession on September 27, 1993.
