= KSBS-FM =

Radio station in Pago Pago, American Samoa

- Pago Pago, American Samoa; American Samoa
- Broadcast area: American Samoa
- Frequency: 92.1 MHz

Programming
- Format: Polynesian-easy listening with jazz

Ownership
- Owner: Samoa Technologies, Inc.

History
- First air date: April 14, 1988
- Former call signs: KASN-FM
- Call sign meaning: "Samoa Broadcasting System"

Technical information
- Licensing authority: FCC
- Facility ID: 58760
- Class: C3
- ERP: 15,000 watts
- HAAT: −28 meters (−92 ft)
- Transmitter coordinates: 14°17′41″S 170°39′44″W

Links
- Public license information: Public file; LMS
- Website: http://www.ksbsfm92.com/

KSBS-FM (92.1 FM) is Samoa's first commercial FM radio station broadcasting a variety format including local Polynesian, oldies, easy listening music. KSBS-FM broadcasts religious programming on Sunday mornings as well as hourly news from the BBC World Service, NPR, Voice of America, Radio Australia and Radio New Zealand International. Licensed by the U.S. Federal Communications Commission to Pago Pago, American Samoa, it serves the general American Samoa area. Also known as "Island 92", KSBS-FM is owned by Samoa Technologies.

The station was assigned the KSBS-FM call letters by the Federal Communications Commission on April 6, 1988.

== History of call letters ==
The call letters KSBS were earlier assigned to an FM station in Kansas City, Kansas, which began broadcasting October 5, 1947. It operated on 105.9 MHz and was licensed to Sunflower Broadcasting System Incorporated.
