= KZUC-LP =

- Edmond, Oklahoma; United States
- Frequency: 99.3 MHz
- Branding: UCentral Radio

Programming
- Format: Hot adult contemporary

Ownership
- Owner: University of Central Oklahoma
- Sister stations: KUCO

History
- Founded: April 4, 1966
- First air date: September 16, 2015
- Call sign meaning: University of Central Oklahoma

Technical information
- Licensing authority: FCC
- Facility ID: 196796
- Class: L1
- ERP: 13 watts
- HAAT: 82 meters (269 ft)
- Transmitter coordinates: 35°39′37.8″N 97°28′10.86″W
- Repeater: 90.1 KUCO-HD2 (Edmond)

Links
- Public license information: LMS
- Website: ucentralmedia.com

KZUC-LP (99.3 FM, "UCentral Radio") is the student radio station on the campus of the University of Central Oklahoma in Edmond, Oklahoma. UCentral Radio applied for an LPFM license in November 2013 and was awarded a construction permit by the Federal Communications Commission on February 24, 2015. UCentral Radio is part of the UCentral student media network at the University of Central Oklahoma.

== History ==
Then-Central State College became a radio broadcaster when it launched student-operated KCSC (now KUCO) at 88.1 MHz on April 4, 1966. This station was used primarily as an educational tool to prepare students for positions in the broadcasting industry. It was upgraded twice, first to 28,000 watts on 90.1 MHz in 1968 and then to 100,000 watts in 1978.

In 1979, the station began broadcasting a full-time classical music format. While this dramatically increased public support, student body interest in the station declined, as did the involvement of broadcast students with an increasingly professionalized KCSC. As to not disrupt the operations of an increasingly successful KCSC, faculty realized a separate facility was needed to provide students with radio broadcast experience.

=== Separation ===
In the spring of 1983, preparations of equipment and facilities to create a student cable radio station began. On March 18, 1983, at 2:15 am, the Edmond Fire Department responded to a single fire alarm in the Communications Building. The fire was in the newly built cable radio studio. Fire officials estimated the damage at $21,500, even though the fire was small. Electrical causes were ruled out. In July 1983, "The Blitz", also known as "KBLZ", began broadcasting over cable television on 93.7 FM. The cable radio station could only be heard by subscribers of Edmond Cablevision, who had to purchase a CATV splitter and connect a stereo receiver from the cable box. Students programmed the station from 6 p.m. until midnight. The format was a blend of album-oriented rock (AOR) and contemporary hits. The station was made possible by the combined efforts of Dr. Mike Dunn, director of KCSC, Dr. Jack Deskin of the CSU-2 television station and Barbara Norman, chair of the Oral Communications Department.

As of September 1993, still no frequency allocations or funds were available in the Edmond or Oklahoma City area to apply for or buy an FM or AM license. KBLZ did receive $3,500 from the Student Activities Council to purchase and place two 10-microwatt transmitters in the east and west residence halls of the university, allowing dorm residents to listen to the station on 99.9 FM. A year later, Multimedia Cablevision ceased carrying radio stations, including KBLZ, in 1994, and the station changed its identity to "Z-99" and began identifying as "KUCO".

By 2002, KUCO broadcast its signal on a part-15 transmitter that could only be received on campus, much like the original 10-watt student radio station in 1966. The station also launched an Internet broadcast for listeners online at kucofm.net. By this time, however, the existence of a student radio station was unknown to students outside the broadcasting program. The reason was postulated that student listeners did not carry personal radios, could not receive the signal in their cars off campus, and only a limited number had personal computers.

In the spring of 2006, KUCO rebranded itself as Z-100 (instead of Z-99) and flipped from alternative rock to a more student-friendly contemporary hit radio format geared towards 18 to 25-year-old students. Automation allowed students to produce and record content that could be played 24 hours a day.

When KCSC installed an HD Radio transmitter in 2007, the student station became an HD2 subchannel of that station, making it available to the general public again. Known as "Ed 90.1, Today's College Music", the station carried an adult contemporary format as well as student-produced news and sports content. The "Ed" represented both Edmond and education. However, interest in HD Radio technology was low. HD receivers were limited in new vehicles; HD Radios were not portable; smartphones were becoming popular with downloadable music from iTunes and popular music service apps such as Pandora and Spotify; and there was considerable consumer confusion between high-definition television and HD Radio. After a few years, KCSC's HD transmitter failed on the secondary channel and not replaced; the student radio station was off air indefinitely.

In November 2013, the possibility of a student radio station returned when the FCC opened a filing window for low-power FM frequencies. UCentral Radio was awarded a construction permit for 13 watts on 99.3 MHz in 2015, taking the call letters KZUC-LP.

In December 2022, the station increased its signal size by simulcasting on KUCO-HD2. KUCO-HD2 was the former signal of Ed 90.1.
