= CIBE-FM =

Coordinates: 51°13′33″N 58°40′11″W

- Saint-Augustin, Côte-Nord, Quebec; Canada
- Frequency: 90.1 MHz

Programming
- Format: Community radio

Ownership
- Owner: Corporation de Radio Montagnaise de St-Augustin

Technical information
- Licensing authority: CRTC
- Class: VLP
- ERP: 1 watt
- HAAT: 11 metres (36 ft)

Links
- Website: socam.net/reseaux/cibe-89-9fm

CIBE-FM is a First Nations community radio station that operates at 90.1 FM in Pakuashipi, Quebec, Canada.

The station is owned by Corporation de Radio montagnaise de St-Augustin.
