= KSWI =

- Atlantic, Iowa; United States
- Frequency: 95.7 MHz
- Branding: KS 95.7

Programming
- Format: Classic hits
- Affiliations: United Stations Radio Networks

Ownership
- Owner: Meredith Communications, LLC
- Sister stations: KSOM

History
- First air date: 2000; 26 years ago
- Call sign meaning: Southwest Iowa

Technical information
- Licensing authority: FCC
- Facility ID: 79302
- Class: C3
- ERP: 20,000 watts
- HAAT: 109 meters (358 feet)
- Transmitter coordinates: 41°26′07″N 94°50′00″W

Links
- Public license information: Public file; LMS
- Webcast: Listen Live
- Website: westerniowatoday.com

KSWI (95.7 FM, "KS 95.7") is a radio station licensed to serve Atlantic, Iowa. The station is owned by Meredith Communications, LLC. It airs a classic hits music format.

The station was assigned the KSWI callsign by the Federal Communications Commission on April 17, 2000.
