= WTJT =

- Baker, Florida; United States
- Broadcast area: Ft. Walton Beach area
- Frequency: 90.1 MHz

Programming
- Format: Christian radio

Ownership
- Owner: Robert John Williamson; (Florala Radio Group)

History
- Call sign meaning: We're Trusting Jesus Today

Technical information
- Licensing authority: FCC
- Facility ID: 50160
- Class: C2
- ERP: 50,000 watts
- HAAT: 127.0 meters
- Transmitter coordinates: 30°49′19.00″N 86°42′37.00″W

Links
- Public license information: Public file; LMS
- Website: Official Website

WTJT (90.1 FM) is a radio station broadcasting a Christian radio format. Licensed to Baker, Florida, United States, the station serves the Ft. Walton Beach area. The station is currently owned by Robert John Williamson, through licensee Florala Radio Group.

The morning Gospel Cruise with Scott Dennis began on April 11, 2011. Weekdays from 6 a.m.- 10 a.m.
