= FM La Boca =

Radio station in Argentina

Argentina
- Broadcast area: Buenos Aires
- Frequency: 90.1 MHz on FM

Programming
- Format: News/music radio

History
- First air date: June 1986

Links
- Website: fmlaboca.com.ar

FM La Boca (call sign LRL 331) is an Argentine radio station. The station began broadcasting from the Buenos Aires neighborhood of La Boca in 1986.

FM La Boca is known for being one of the first Argentine community radio stations.
