= KSOM =

Radio station in Audubon, Iowa

- Audubon, Iowa; United States
- Broadcast area: Atlantic, Iowa
- Frequency: 96.5 MHz
- Branding: 96.5 KSOM

Programming
- Format: Country
- Affiliations: ABC News Radio

Ownership
- Owner: Meredith Communications
- Sister stations: KSWI

History
- First air date: August 1995; 30 years ago

Technical information
- Licensing authority: FCC
- Facility ID: 63296
- Class: C1
- ERP: 100,000 watts
- HAAT: 161 meters
- Transmitter coordinates: 41°26′07″N 94°50′0″W

Links
- Public license information: Public file; LMS
- Webcast: Listen Live
- Website: westerniowatoday.com

KSOM (96.5 FM, "96.5 KSOM") is a radio station that broadcasts a country music format. Licensed to Audubon, Iowa, United States, it serves the southwest Iowa area. The station is owned by Meredith Communications, LLC.

The studios are located in Atlantic, Iowa. KSOM broadcasts Iowa State Cyclones sports, NASCAR, and area high school sports. KSOM offers farm reports from Waitt Agribusiness.
