= CJMP-FM =

Radio station in Powell River, British Columbia

Coordinates: 49°50′12″N 124°31′38″W

- Powell River, British Columbia; Canada
- Frequency: 90.1 MHz
- Branding: CJMP Powell River Community Radio (formerly "Jump Radio")

Programming
- Format: community radio

Ownership
- Owner: Powell River Community Radio Society

History
- First air date: 2002
- Call sign meaning: From former "Jump Radio" brand

Technical information
- Class: LP
- ERP: 3.6 watts
- HAAT: -28.3 metres

Links
- Website: cjmp.ca

CJMP-FM is a Canadian radio station, which broadcasts at 90.1 FM in Powell River, British Columbia. The station's license was originally owned and operated by the Powell River Model Community Project, and on May 5, 2010, the Powell River Community Radio Society received CRTC approval to acquire Powell River Model Community Project and a new broadcasting licence to continue the operation of CJMP-FM.

CJMP-FM received its original approval by the CRTC in 2002, and was granted a new license in 2006. Under the CRTC's licensing regulations for developmental community radio stations, the station was required to submit a new license application rather than a simple renewal of its existing license.
