= KOLU =

- Pasco, Washington; United States
- Frequency: 90.1 MHz
- Branding: Christian Family Radio

Programming
- Format: Conservative Christian radio

Ownership
- Owner: First Baptist Church of Riverview

History
- First air date: September 1, 1971

Technical information
- Licensing authority: FCC
- Facility ID: 56615
- Class: C1
- ERP: 39,000 watts
- HAAT: 305 meters (1,001 ft)
- Transmitter coordinates: 46°4′59.00″N 119°9′38.00″W
- Translators: 88.9 K205FT (Yakima) (89.5 MHz) K208BY (Moses Lake); 92.3 K222BP (Prosser); 93.7 K229BN (La Grande, OR)
- Repeaters: 90.9 KOLX (Warden); 89.5 KGCF (Aberdeen)

Links
- Public license information: Public file; LMS
- Webcast: Listen Live
- Website: kolu.com

KOLU (90.1 FM) is a radio station broadcasting a Conservative Christian radio format. Licensed to Pasco, Washington, United States, the station is currently owned by First Baptist Church of Riverview.

== History ==
In January 1971, Riverview Baptist Christian Schools applied for a permit for this station, and KOLU began broadcasting on September 1, 1971.

In 2018, First Baptist Church of Riverview purchased 93.7 K229BN in La Grande, Oregon from KCMB LLC for $20,000 and in 2022 they purchased 89.5 K208BY in Moses Lake, Washington from Centro Familiar Cristiano for $23,000, both of which began rebroadcasting KOLU. On February 7, 2025, 90.9 FM KOLX in Warden, Washington began broadcasting, simulcasting KOLU. On August 6, 2025, 89.5 FM KGCF in Aberdeen, Washington began broadcasting from the top of the city's historic Becker Building, simulcasting KOLU, but with plans for localized programming.

== Translators ==
KOLU is also heard on full powered stations KGCF 89.5 in Aberdeen, Washington and KOLX, 90.9 FM in Warden, Washington, as well as four translators.

Call sign	Frequency	City of license	State	Class	ERP (W)	Height (m (ft))	FCC info
KGCF	89.5 FM	Aberdeen	Washington	A	400	−31 m (−102 ft)	FCC (KGCF)
KOLX	90.9 FM	Warden	Washington	A	610	79 m (259 ft)	FCC (KOLX)
K205FT	88.9 FM	Yakima	Washington	D	15.5	273.9 m (899 ft)	FCC (K205FT)
K208BY	89.5 FM	Moses Lake	Washington	D	250	34 m (112 ft)	FCC (K208BY)
K222BP	92.3 FM	Prosser	Washington	D	23	242.4 m (795 ft)	FCC (K222BP)
K229BN	93.7 FM	La Grande	Oregon	D	10	8 m (26 ft)	FCC (K229BN)
