= KBGV =

- Monte Vista, Colorado; United States
- Frequency: 1240 kHz
- Branding: Classic Hit Country

Programming
- Format: Country
- Affiliations: AP Radio

Ownership
- Owner: Jeanne Sue Sakers and Robert Trigilio, Jr.; (Buffalo Broadcasting of Colorado, LLC)
- Sister stations: KSLV-FM, KYDN

History
- Former call signs: KSLV (1954–2019)

Technical information
- Licensing authority: FCC
- Facility ID: 58903
- Class: C
- Power: 1,000 watts (unlimited)
- Transmitter coordinates: 37°36′10″N 106°8′58″W
- Translator: 101.3 K267BQ (Monte Vista)

Links
- Public license information: Public file; LMS
- Website: kslvradio.com

KBGV (1240 AM, "Classic Hit Country") is a radio station broadcasting a country music format. Licensed to Monte Vista, Colorado, United States, the station is currently owned by Jeanne Sue Sakers and Robert Trigilio, Jr., through licensee Buffalo Broadcasting of Colorado, LLC, and features programming from AP Radio.
