= KYDN =

- Monte Vista, Colorado; United States
- Frequency: 95.3 MHz

Programming
- Format: Country

Ownership
- Owner: Jeanne Sue Sakers and Robert Trigilio, Jr.; (Buffalo Broadcasting of Colorado, LLC)
- Sister stations: KBGV, KSLV-FM

History
- Former call signs: KSLV-FM (1984–2008)

Technical information
- Licensing authority: FCC
- Facility ID: 58901
- Class: A
- ERP: 6,000 watts
- HAAT: 27 meters (89 ft)
- Transmitter coordinates: 37°36′10″N 106°8′58″W

Links
- Public license information: Public file; LMS
- Webcast: Listen live
- Website: kydncountry.com

KYDN (95.3 FM) is a radio station licensed to Monte Vista, Colorado, United States. The station is currently owned by Jeanne Sue Sakers and Robert Trigilio, Jr., through licensee Buffalo Broadcasting of Colorado, LLC.

== History ==
The station was assigned the call sign KSLV-FM on 1984-06-15. On 2008-09-29, the station changed its call sign to the current KYDN.
