= WYPW-LP =

- Brandon, Florida; United States
- Broadcast area: Tampa, Florida
- Frequency: 90.1 MHz
- Branding: "Power 90.1"

Programming
- Format: Contemporary hit radio

Ownership
- Owner: New Media Humanity Association, Inc.

History
- First air date: January 23, 2015
- Former frequencies: 99.9 MHz (2015–2016)
- Call sign meaning: Power

Technical information
- Licensing authority: FCC
- Facility ID: 192915
- Class: L1
- Power: 23 watts
- HAAT: 62 meters (203 ft)
- Transmitter coordinates: 27°56′21.0″N 82°16′35.0″W

Links
- Public license information: LMS
- Webcast: Listen Live
- Website: power901.com

WYPW-LP (90.1 FM) is a low-powered broadcast radio station licensed to Brandon, Florida, serving Tampa and Hillsborough County in Florida, broadcasting a Contemporary hit radio format. WYPW-LP is owned and operated by New Media Humanity Association, Inc.

== History ==
WYPW-LP originally signed on January 23, 2015 in Brandon, Florida. The station was founded by a Florida-based non-profit organization New Media Humanity Association, Inc.

The station initially signed in as "Power 100" as its initial branding on the 99.9 FM frequency during its first year of broadcasting as a low powered station. It was built from the ground up that included station operator Andy Kovacs, who then launched the station as a described "David vs Goliath" competitor to the massive corporate media conglomerates. Operating with a low-power budget without any sort of major billboard or advertising funds, WYPW-LP specifically targeted its Contemporary hit radio format to listeners living in Brandon and Eastern Hillsborough.

In November 2016, engineers filed an emergency minor modification system with the Federal Communications Commission (FCC) to relocate the station down to a lower frequency, following major crowding issues that occurred earlier thought the year. By December, WYPW-LP later rebranded under its current branding as "Power 90.1" once the FCC granted the technical change from its original 99.9 FM frequency to its current 90.1 FM frequency.
