= Skagit Valley College =

Community college in Mount Vernon, Washington, US

Coordinates: 48°26′15″N 122°18′38″W

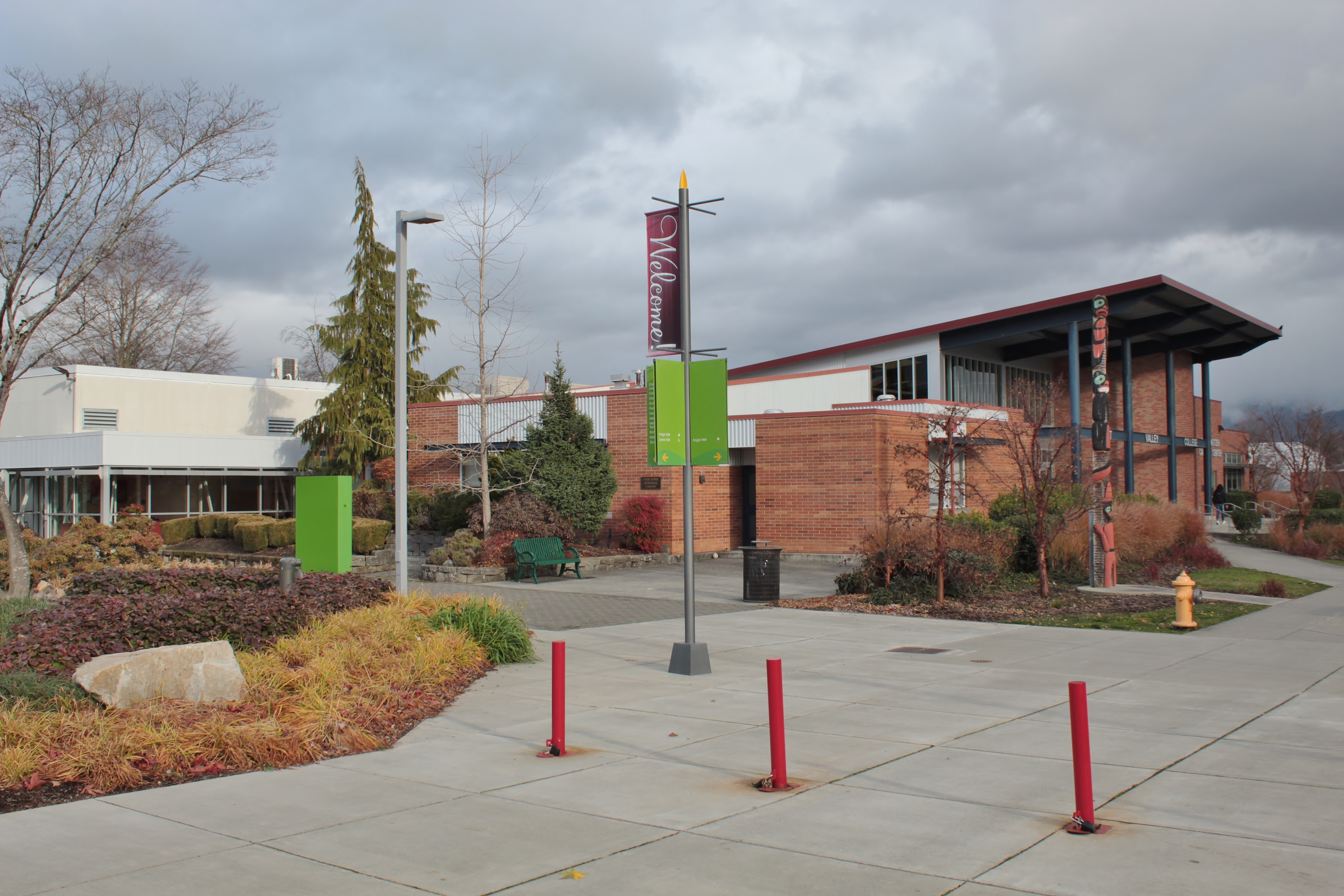
- Cardinal Building at SVC
- Type: Public community college
- Established: 1926
- President: Christopher M. Villa
- Undergraduates: 4,418
- Location: Mount Vernon, Washington, United States
- Colors: Cardinal Red and White
- Nickname: Cardinals
- Mascot: Fighting Cardinal
- Website: www.skagit.edu

Skagit Valley College (SVC) is a public community college in Mount Vernon, Washington. It serves students in Skagit, Island, and San Juan counties in northwest Washington state. Established in 1926, SVC is as the second-oldest continuously operating community college in the state of Washington. SVC grants academic transfer pathways, professional/technical degrees, and certificates. The academic transfer degree and several professional/technical degrees can be completed online. SVC also offers Basic Education for Adults and Community Education courses. Courses are offered during Summer, Fall, Winter, and Spring quarters.

The SVC district includes two campuses and three centers: the Mount Vernon Campus, SVC's main campus, is located in Mount Vernon, Washington, and the Whidbey Island Campus is located in Oak Harbor, Washington. The San Juan Center is located in Friday Harbor, and the Marine Technology Center in Anacortes, Washington. Also, SVC serves many military and their dependents at the college's Whidbey Island Campus.

SVC offers three Bachelor of Applied Science Degrees: Environmental Conservation, Applied Management, and Healthcare Management.

== McIntyre Hall ==
Local public schools use McIntyre Hall for band, orchestra, and choir concerts. One concert features the Mount Vernon High School Wind Ensemble playing their debut Carnegie Hall concert. The concert featured Toccatta and Fugue In D Minor, Machu Picchu by Satoshi Yagisawa, and Wayfaring Stranger by Christopher Nelson.

== Athletics ==
Skagit Valley College competes in the Northwest Athletic Conference (NWAC) as the Cardinals, fielding men's teams for baseball, women's teams for softball and volleyball and men's and women's teams for basketball, golf, soccer and tennis.

== Alumni ==
Among notable alumni of the college is the Malawian writer Legson Kayira (c.1942–2012), who after walking all the way from Nyasaland to Uganda as a young man applied to the College and was awarded a scholarship, which he took up in January 1961.

Mount Vernon resident Lawrence Colburn, a United States Army helicopter crew member who intervened to stop the 1968 Mỹ Lai massacre, later attended Skagit Valley Junior College using the G.I. Bill.

Actor Jeffrey Dean Morgan also attended Skagit Valley College, where he played basketball before being sidelined by injury.
