= KUCO (FM) =

Coordinates: 35.573°N 97.486°W

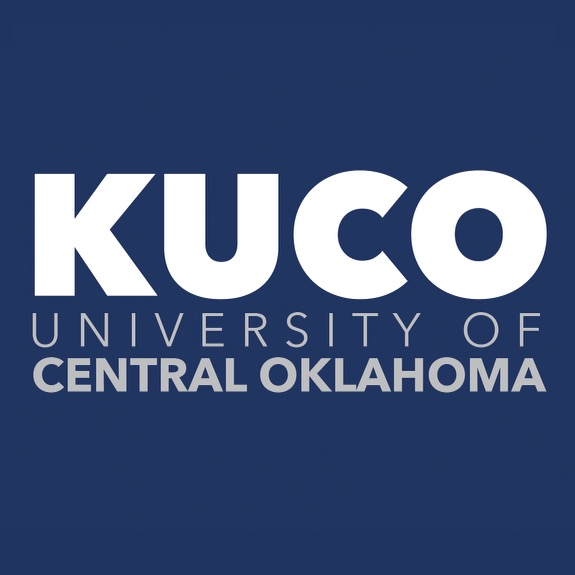
- Edmond, Oklahoma; United States
- Broadcast area: Oklahoma City Metroplex
- Frequency: 90.1 MHz (HD Radio)
- Branding: Classical KUCO

Programming
- Format: Classical music
- Subchannels: HD2: UCentral Radio; HD3: ACM@KUCO

Ownership
- Owner: University of Central Oklahoma

History
- First air date: April 4, 1966 (as KCSC at 88.1)
- Former call signs: KCSC (1966–2014)
- Former frequencies: 88.1 MHz (1966–1968)
- Call sign meaning: University of Central Oklahoma

Technical information
- Licensing authority: FCC
- Facility ID: 66632
- Class: C1
- ERP: 100,000 watts
- HAAT: 255 meters (837 ft)

Links
- Public license information: Public file; LMS
- Webcast: Listen live
- Website: classicalkuco.org

KUCO (90.1 FM) is a classical music radio station serving the Oklahoma City, Oklahoma, area, owned by the University of Central Oklahoma. Studios are located at the UCO at Santa Fe Plaza development in downtown Oklahoma City.

== History ==
=== Student radio ===
On October 19, 1965, the Federal Communications Commission granted Central State College a construction permit for a new student radio station to be built on the CSC campus. On April 4, 1966, KCSC took to the air from studios in the former president's office in what had been the Central State administration building. Funded by a $25,000 donation from alumnus Homer L. Johnson, a rancher from Duncan, KCSC aired mostly classical and light dinner music, alongside extensive coverage of Central State athletic events, a bulletin board for campus events, and news coverage. Max O. Davis, chairman of Central's speech department, stated the station will be used primarily as an educational tool to prepare students for positions in the broadcasting industry. Enrollment for radio courses increased from 6 students in 1962 to 120 that year.

KCSC did not remain a 10-watt outlet for long. On November 24, 1967, the FCC approved a power increase to 28,000 watts on 90.1 MHz. The school had constructed a new 150 ft (46 m) radio tower across from the campus football stadium the preceding summer. It was estimated by student Joe Findlay that KCSC could reach 75 percent of Oklahoma's population. The change was made in 1968. When the school was elevated to university status as Central State University, it tried to change the calls to KCSU, but those calls were already being used by Colorado State's student station. In 1978, the station built a new 400 ft (120 m) tower and increased its effective radiated power to 100,000 watts, extending its coverage to nearly all of central Oklahoma; the upgrade, paid for by a $100,000 grant from the Kerr Foundation, also saw the station begin to increase its classical music programming.

=== Classical music ===
The format had changed to almost entirely classical and jazz music by 1979. The new format fueled a major increase in listener support; from 1979 to 1985, KCSC's budget doubled every year even as the university cut in other areas. The station briefly also became a member of NPR; Oklahoma City had been one of the largest cities without a full-market NPR station, previously depending on fringe reception from Oklahoma State's KOSU and the University of Oklahoma's KGOU. However, the intensive classical format and more professionalized operation led to a drop in student interest. In 1983, a cable-only campus station, "KBLZ", was created for student programming; this continued in various guises and is now a low-power FM station, KZUC-LP 99.3 "UCentral Radio".

In 1993, however, KGOU built a repeater in Spencer to better serve Oklahoma City. Central and OU agreed to adopt non-conflicting schedules in 1996. Although KCSC was the more powerful station, it dropped all NPR programming to become an all-classical station, while KGOU became central Oklahoma's main outlet for NPR programming. This left most of central Oklahoma without a clear signal for NPR news and talk programming until KOSU moved its tower closer to Oklahoma City in 2005.

On April 1, 2014, KCSC changed its call letters to KUCO.

== HD Radio ==
KUCO transmits an HD Radio signal. HD2 currently carries a simulcast of UCentral Radio. HD3 currently carries ACM@KUCO.
