= KQMC =

- Hawthorne, Nevada; United States
- Frequency: 90.1 MHz
- Branding: 90.1 KQMC

Programming
- Format: Classic hits

Ownership
- Owner: Lucky Boy Educational Media, Inc.
- Sister stations: KELC

History
- First air date: 2005

Technical information
- Licensing authority: FCC
- Facility ID: 79036
- Class: C2
- ERP: 480 watts
- HAAT: 957 meters (3142 feet)
- Transmitter coordinates: 38°27′28″N 118°45′52″W

Links
- Public license information: Public file; LMS

KQMC (90.1 FM) is a radio station licensed to serve Hawthorne, Nevada. The station is owned by Lucky Boy Educational Media, Inc. It airs a classic hits format.

The station was assigned the KQMC call letters by the Federal Communications Commission on February 5, 2003.
