= KSAK =

Radio station at Mt. San Antonio College in Walnut, California

- Walnut, California; United States
- Broadcast area: Portions of The San Gabriel Valley
- Frequency: 90.1 MHz
- Branding: 90.1 Fred FM

Programming
- Format: Rap and rock

Ownership
- Owner: Mount San Antonio College

History
- First air date: January 2, 1974
- Call sign meaning: Mt. San Antonio College

Technical information
- Licensing authority: FCC
- Facility ID: 46740
- Class: D
- ERP: 4 watts (4,000 Milliwatts)
- HAAT: 165 meters (541 ft)
- Transmitter coordinates: 34°02′18″N 117°53′21″W

Links
- Public license information: Public file; LMS
- Webcast: Listen live
- Website: www.mtsac.edu/audiomedia/fred_fm.html

KSAK (90.1 FM) is the campus radio station of the Mt. San Antonio College in Walnut, California, United States. Broadcasters and producers from local commercial radio stations teach classes at the college and supervise students who produce and announce news and music programming. The station broadcasts music in blocks of hip-hop, alternative rock, and pop music, interspersed with news and public service announcements.

== History ==
On December 21, 1972, the Mount San Antonio Community College District received the construction permit for 90.1 FM, broadcasting with 3.5 watts. The station went on the air January 2, 1974, after being a carrier current station.

In fall 2011, the station was rebranded as "90.1 FM MtRock" after a management change at the college. The station is currently a rock format, playing rock from 1960 to today, as well as music from local Los Angeles artists and is operated by students at the college.

As of 2025, the station was rebranded to 90.1 Fred FM, a tribute to a student within the Mt. SAC Audio Media Program.

== See also ==
- College radio
- List of college radio stations in the United States
