= KSVR (FM) =

Community radio station in Mount Vernon, Washington

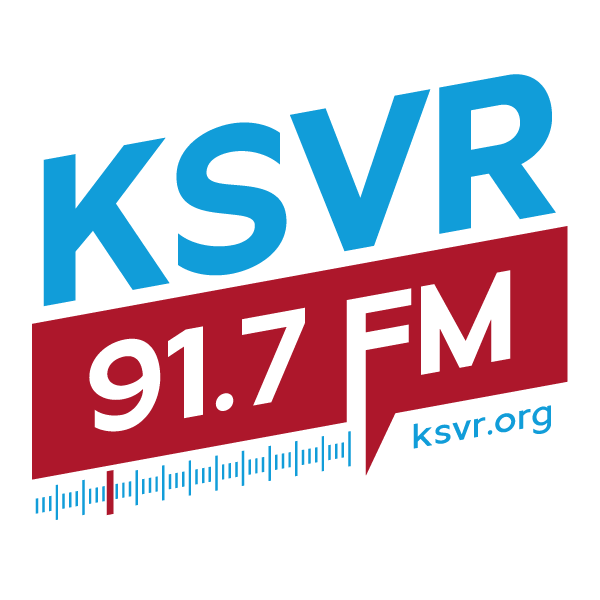
- Mount Vernon, Washington; United States
- Frequency: 91.7 MHz
- Branding: Skagit Valley College Community Radio

Programming
- Format: English and Spanish variety

Ownership
- Owner: Skagit Valley College Board of Trustees

History
- First air date: 1973
- Former call signs: KTHY (2002); KMWS (2002)

Technical information
- Licensing authority: FCC
- Facility ID: 83092
- Class: A
- ERP: 170 watts
- HAAT: 204 m (669 ft)
- Transmitter coordinates: 48°23′48.3″N 122°18′30.5″W

Links
- Public license information: Public file; LMS
- Webcast: Listen live
- Website: www.ksvr.org

KSVR (91.7 FM) is a radio station broadcasting a variety and Regional Mexican format. Licensed to broadcast from Mount Vernon, Washington, United States, the station serves all of Skagit County; the station is currently owned by Board of Trustees of Skagit Valley College. The station broadcasts from Little Mountain, southeast of downtown Mount Vernon.

== History ==
KSVR launched its first broadcast in May 1973 on 90.1 FM from the campus of Skagit Valley College in Mount Vernon, Washington. The station's broadcast frequency later moved to 91.7 FM in 2002 after a signal conflict with Washington State University's KNWP that began in March 1997. KNWP broadcast with 1,600 watts, which would override KSVR's then-100-watt signal. The two stations were 60 miles (97 km) apart, but the topography of the region allowed KNWP more signal. At the time, KSVR was the only station broadcasting Spanish programming to the area. Whereas KNWP was part of a larger public radio network, KSVR did not have that financial backing. The manager of KNWP at the time, said that they followed the rules when they sought approval from the FCC and the Canadian government. When the problem was discovered, KNWP offered KSVR a better antenna. WSU also offered to help KSVR seek a better frequency as well as reimbursement for the cost of relocating its antenna to improve coverage.

== Programming ==
KSVR's programming includes Spanish-language music and information, folk, bluegrass, hip-hop, jazz, oldies, and various international music formats to news-talk and locally focused informational programs. The station also broadcasts program selections from NPR. Some of the music programming includes local Spanish artists. Local band MV2 used the station to help coordinate a remembrance of Spanish artist Selena in 2007. The station has helped some students further their careers in radio broadcasting by giving them hands-on experience. In November 2006, the station was represented at the World Association of Community Radio Broadcasters conference, which brought together over 300 radio stations from 94 countries. The station has also spawned original programming.

== See also ==
- List of community radio stations in the United States
