= CFPV-FM =

Coordinates: 50°19′39″N 122°49′20″W

- Pemberton, British Columbia; Canada
- Frequency: 98.9 MHz
- Branding: Spud Valley Radio

Programming
- Format: Community radio

Ownership
- Owner: McBride Communications

History
- First air date: June 6, 2008
- Last air date: March 31, 2020 (expiration of licence)
- Call sign meaning: Pemberton Valley

Technical information
- Class: A
- ERP: 0.42 kW
- HAAT: −789.8 metres (−2,591 ft)

CFPV-FM was a Canadian radio station. Owned by McBride Communications, the station broadcast at 98.9 FM in Pemberton, British Columbia.

== History ==
On November 27, 2006, 0749943 BC Ltd. (Matthew G. McBride) received approval from the Canadian Radio-television and Telecommunications Commission (CRTC) to operate a new english-language FM radio station in Pemberton.

By late November 2007, studio space was leased and prepared, but problems arose with the transmitter installation on Signal Hill, and further problems with telephone line installations delayed the sign-on. CFPV-FM signed on June 6, 2008, at 7:00am.

On February 28, 2020, the CRTC denied a renewal of CFPV's licence (which was to expire on March 31, 2020), citing a long-term pattern of non-compliance with various regulatory and license requirements, including a failure to keep and submit complete and accurate program logs, failure to pay required contributions to Canadian content development (CCD), failure to broadcast on-air notices informing listeners of its previous non-compliance, as well as a poor commitment to on-air content of local interest.
