= CKPM-FM =

Former radio station in Port Moody, British Columbia

Coordinates: 49°17′02″N 122°49′31″W

- Port Moody, British Columbia; Canada
- Broadcast area: Tri-Cities
- Frequency: 98.7 MHz
- Branding: The Point 98.7 CKPM

Programming
- Format: Adult album alternative

Ownership
- Owner: McBride Communications & Media

History
- First air date: 26 December 2012
- Last air date: 29 June 2019
- Call sign meaning: Port Moody

Technical information
- Class: A
- ERP: 1 kilowatts
- HAAT: -155.1 m

CKPM-FM was a radio station owned and operated by McBride Communications & Media. Licensed to Port Moody, British Columbia, Canada, and operating at 98.7 FM, the station served the Tri-Cities area. The station broadcast an adult album alternative format.

== History ==
On 30 May 2008, Matthew Gordon McBride, on behalf of McBride Communications, received approval from the Canadian Radio-television and Telecommunications Commission (CRTC) to operate a new English-language radio station in Port Moody. CKPM broadcasts with an ERP of 1,000 watts with an HAAT of -155.1m.

In November 2008, controversy arose regarding a proposal on the station's new physical location. Port Moody city council voted 4–3 in favour of allowing CKPM to operate out of the city's recreation centre but several residents spoke against the proposal during the hearing, and the station is reconsidering its options as to where to locate in the Tri-Cities.

The launch of the station was delayed several times. In October 2011, Matthew McBride stated CKPM would be on air for the local civic elections in November 2011. On 23 April 2012, McBride received permission to change the technical parameters of the station by relocating the transmitter site, increasing the average effective radiated power from 470 to 540 watts, and by increasing the effective height of the antenna above average terrain from -193.2 metres to -155.1 metres.

On 6 November 2012, CKPM-FM began testing its transmitter. The station officially launched on 26 December 2012.

=== License non-renewal ===
In an intervention opposing renewal of the station's license, Max Radio Society presented evidence that the station's over-the-air signal had been silent since at least April 2018. McBride Communications disputed the claim as misinformation, stating that it had only been silent since 29 June 2019. McBride stated it had pulled out of a monthly rental agreement for the transmitter site, was in the process of seeking a new site, and that it had expected to bring the station back on-air within five months if its license were renewed. The CRTC showed significant concern for the station's status.

The CRTC also found that the station fell short of its specific Canadian content quotas for specific music categories, failed to keep and present complete and accurate program logs, failed to pay required contributions to Canadian content development (CCD), failed to submit full documentation of a change in shareholders, and a poor commitment to broadcasting up-to-date local news and information. Therefore, on 28 February 2020, the CRTC denied renewal to CKPM's license after 30 March 2020.

The call letters and 98.7 FM frequency were made dormant.
