= WDCE =

- Richmond, Virginia; United States
- Broadcast area: Metro Richmond
- Frequency: 90.1 MHz
- Branding: WDCE 90.1 FM

Programming
- Format: Variety

Ownership
- Owner: University of Richmond

History
- Founded: November 2, 1961
- First air date: September 7, 1977

Technical information
- Licensing authority: FCC
- Facility ID: 69312
- Class: A
- ERP: 100 watts
- HAAT: 26 meters (85 ft)
- Transmitter coordinates: 37°34′48.0″N 77°32′35.0″W

Links
- Public license information: Public file; LMS
- Webcast: Listen live
- Website: wdce.net

WDCE is a Variety formatted, student-run, broadcast radio station licensed to and serving Richmond, Virginia. WDCE is owned and operated by University of Richmond. Its predecessor, WCRC-AM, first went on air on November 2, 1961, operating with 600 kilocycles on AM and 27 watts of power. WCRC purportedly set a Virginia collegiate radio record in 1962, when they broadcast continuously from January 8 at 4:55 PM to January 12 at 9:00 PM, a total of 100 hours and 5 minutes. It began 24-hour coverage on February 1, 1965. WCRC-AM switched to WDCE-FM on September 7, 1977.

Website: wdce.net
