= KSYM-FM =

Radio station at San Antonio College in San Antonio, Texas

- San Antonio, Texas; United States
- Frequency: 90.1 MHz
- Branding: Your Only Alternative

Programming
- Format: Adult album alternative, college radio

Ownership
- Owner: San Antonio College

History
- First air date: September 15, 1966
- Call sign meaning: "Symbol of Sound Education"

Technical information
- Licensing authority: FCC
- Facility ID: 58788
- Class: A
- ERP: 5,700 watts
- HAAT: 39.0 meters
- Transmitter coordinates: 29°26′50.00″N 98°29′55.00″W

Links
- Public license information: Public file; LMS
- Webcast: listen live
- Website: ksym.org

KSYM-FM (90.1 FM) is a radio station broadcasting an adult album alternative format. Licensed to San Antonio, Texas, United States, the station serves the San Antonio area. The station is currently owned by San Antonio College.

== History ==
KSYM-FM is a 1000 watt (3000 ERP) FM educational non-commercial broadcast station presently operating on 90.1 MHz, with transmitter and studios located in the RTVF Hall on the campus of San Antonio College.

KSYM-FM was the first non-commercial educational broadcast radio station run by a junior college in the state of Texas.

The construction permit for the station was issued on May 10, 1966; the authority to conduct program tests was granted by the FCC on July 29, 1966.

KSYM's establishment was the result of a survey conducted the year before by Dr. Clyde R. Nail, Vice-President of the College and Lynn Emerson, a consultant for the Department of Health, Education, and Welfare for the Texas Education Agency on the educational needs at the junior college level. One of the conclusions of their study was that no junior college in Texas had a technical program for training students in radio or TV broadcasting. Nail then conducted another survey of radio stations in the San Antonio area to find out their personnel needs. The result of the survey was KSYM. In fact, SYM, part of the station's call letters, stands for, “Symbol of Sound Education.”

The first full day of program testing occurred August 6, 1966. The first weekly schedule of programming began officially on September 15, 1966 at 4:00 p.m. on FM channel 212 of the frequency 90.3 transmitting with 250 watts of power through a 4-bay antenna. The new station had three soundproof rooms which contained broadcasting equipment, and a large live studio for live production and program planning.

Dr. Wayland P. Moody was President of the College in 1966. Dr. Clyde R. Nail, Vice-President, obtained matching funds to purchase equipment for the broadcasting facility to provide training for students in Radio-Television-Film Technical Program. Mr. Ron Lucke was Chairman of the Speech Department in 1966.

Miss Jean Longwith, Assistant Professor at the time, prepared the Application to the FCC with the aid of a Consulting Engineer, Mr. Kenneth Hyman. Mr. John Siercovich built the KSYM studio, and later the Studio B, Studio C, and the RTVF Hall studios.

In April 1992, KSYM installed a new eight bay antenna that boosted its effective power to 3000 watts. 05/03/03 11

On August 26, 1996, the station applied for permission from the FCC to increase the effective wattage to 5700 ERP. In December 1997, under the provisions of the FCC, KSYM began broadcasting at 5700 watts ERP.

On August 24, 1998, KSYM began simultaneous webcasting of the signal onto the internet.
