= KQKL (FM) =

Coordinates: 40.400°N 91.586°W

- Keokuk, Iowa; United States
- Broadcast area: Tri-States Region
- Frequency: 95.3 MHz

Programming
- Format: Contemporary Christian
- Network: K-Love

Ownership
- Owner: Educational Media Foundation

History
- First air date: January 16, 1984
- Former call signs: KIMI (1973–1984); KOKX-FM (1984–2019)
- Call sign meaning: K-Love

Technical information
- Licensing authority: FCC
- Facility ID: 70573
- Class: C1
- ERP: 100,000 watts
- HAAT: 245 meters

Links
- Public license information: Public file; LMS
- Website: http://www.klove.com

KQKL (95.3 FM) is a radio station licensed to serve the community of Keokuk, Iowa. The station was owned by Dana Withers' Withers Broadcasting Companies, through licensee Withers Broadcasting Company of Iowa, LLC, until April 14, 2016, until it was sold to Educational Media Foundation.

Originally KIMI, the station was assigned the KOKX-FM call letters by the Federal Communications Commission on January 16, 1984 The station changed its call sign to KQKL to September 12, 2019.

== Format ==
In February 2010, KOKX-FM split away from Citadel Media Networks' "Greatest Mojo" network, formerly known as Classic Hits Radio, and Oldies Radio before that. Until April 2016, it aired what appears to be an Oldies feed from Waitt Radio Networks. After the sale, the station was taken off the air. As of May 2016, the station remained off the air due to needed repairs and "access issues" at the tower site. In August 2016, the station returned to the air as an affiliate of the K-Love radio network.
