= Hamilton, Washington =

- Town
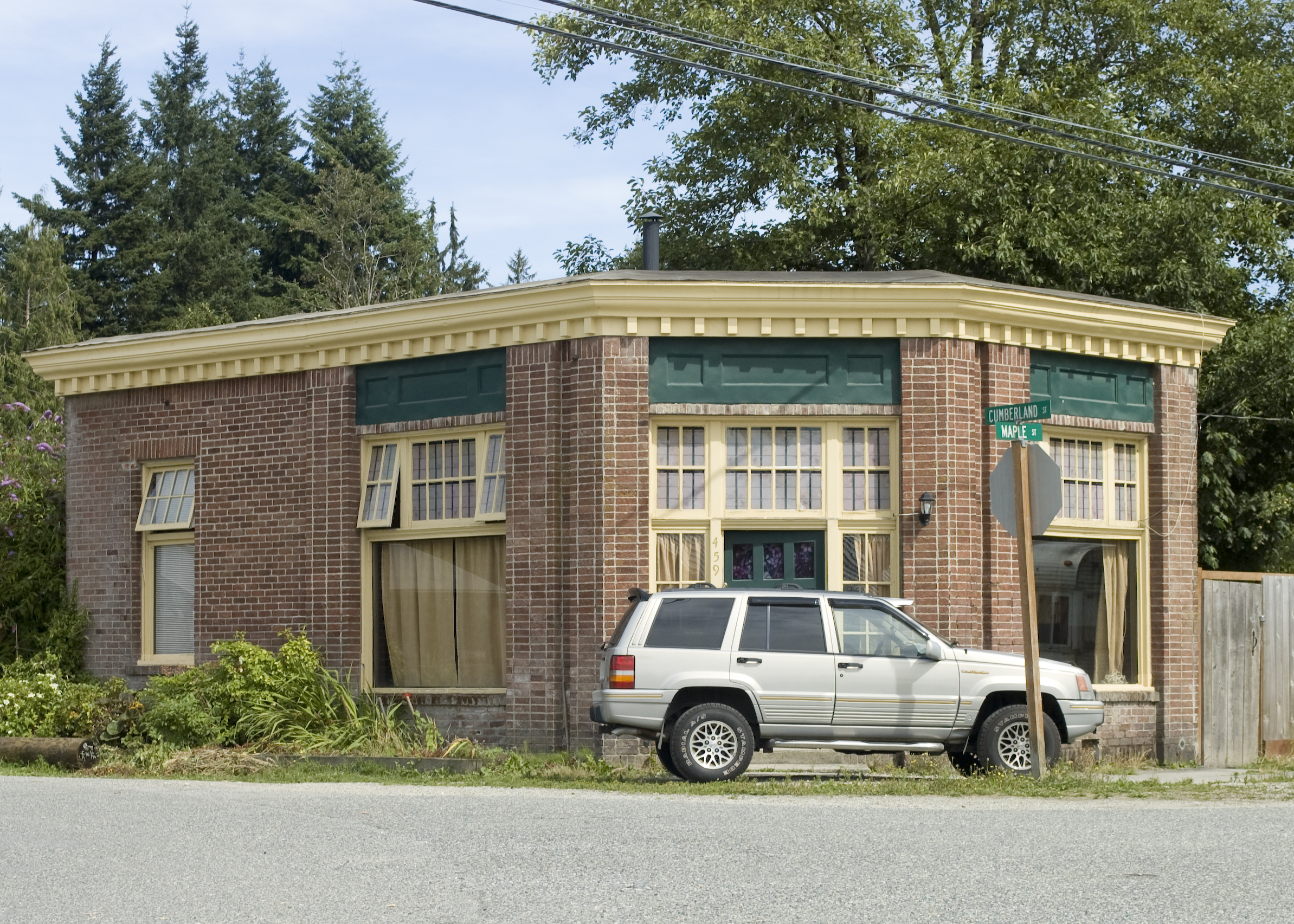

- Location of Hamilton, Washington
- Coordinates: 48°31′34″N 121°59′58″W
- Country: United States
- State: Washington
- County: Skagit

Government
  - Type: Mayor–council
  - Mayor: Mandy Bates

Area
  - Total: 1.20 sq mi (3.10 km^{2})
  - Land: 1.20 sq mi (3.10 km^{2})
  - Water: 0 sq mi (0.00 km^{2})
- Elevation: 95 ft (29 m)

Population (2020)
  - Total: 299
  - Density: 259.0/sq mi (100.01/km^{2})
- Time zone: UTC-8 (Pacific (PST))
  - Summer (DST): UTC-7 (PDT)
- ZIP Code: 98255
- Area code: 360, 564
- FIPS code: 53-29255
- GNIS feature ID: 2412721
- Website: www.townofhamiltonwa.com

Hamilton is a town in Skagit County, Washington, United States. The population was 299 at the 2020 census. It is included in the Mount Vernon-Anacortes, Washington Metropolitan Statistical Area.

== History ==
Hamilton was first settled in 1877 by William Hamilton, and was later named for him when Hamilton was officially incorporated on March 19, 1891.

The town was flooded by the Skagit River in November 2021. The local post office was deemed uninhabitable due to damage from the floods and shut down despite repairs to the building. Mail and parcels bound for Hamilton are instead forwarded to the Concrete post office, located 13 miles (21 km) away, despite protests from residents. In December 2025, one of the largest floods in over 100 years caused huge evacuations. Many people of the town evacuated to Hamilton Baptist Church. The town is currently recovering.

== Geography ==
According to the United States Census Bureau, the town has a total area of 1.13 square miles (2.93 km^{2}), all of it land.

=== Flooding ===
As part of the Skagit River floodway, the town of Hamilton faces significant flooding every few years, most notably in 2003, 2006, 2017, and 2021. The frequent flooding has forced residents to adopt a routine of moving their furniture from the ground floor and evacuating to a local church until the waters recede. The Federal Emergency Management Agency (FEMA) estimates it has spent $4.6 million in the town over the last several years.

Support has been building for a plan to move the entire town to a nearby hill. The Hamilton Public Development Authority was established in 2004 to purchase the land necessary for moving the town, which was achieved with assistance from conservation group Forterra in 2018. Forterra purchased a 45-acre (18 ha) farm north of State Route 20, which it aims to develop into a green city with housing for the relocated townspeople.

=== Climate ===
The climate in this area has mild differences between highs and lows, and there is adequate rainfall year-round. According to the Köppen Climate Classification system, Hamilton has a marine west coast climate, abbreviated "Cfb" on climate maps.

== Demographics ==
Historical population
Census	Pop.	Note	%±
1890	203		—
1900	392		93.1%
1910	405		3.3%
1920	462		14.1%
1930	252		−45.5%
1940	229		−9.1%
1950	294		28.4%
1960	271		−7.8%
1970	196		−27.7%
1980	268		36.7%
1990	228		−14.9%
2000	309		35.5%
2010	301		−2.6%
2020	299		−0.7%
U.S. Decennial Census; 2015 Estimate

=== 2010 census ===
As of the 2010 census, there were 301 people, 116 households, and 80 families living in the town. The population density was 266.4 inhabitants per square mile (102.9/km^{2}). There were 141 housing units at an average density of 124.8 per square mile (48.2/km^{2}). The racial makeup of the town was 90.4% White, 2.0% Native American, 3.7% from other races, and 4.0% from two or more races. Hispanic or Latino of any race were 4.3% of the population.

There were 116 households, of which 31.9% had children under the age of 18 living with them, 51.7% were married couples living together, 9.5% had a female householder with no husband present, 7.8% had a male householder with no wife present, and 31.0% were non-families. 19.0% of all households were made up of individuals, and 1.7% had someone living alone who was 65 years of age or older. The average household size was 2.59 and the average family size was 2.99.

The median age in the town was 40.5 years. 23.9% of residents were under the age of 18; 9.6% were between the ages of 18 and 24; 25.9% were from 25 to 44; 30.5% were from 45 to 64; and 10% were 65 years of age or older. The gender makeup of the town was 48.5% male and 51.5% female.

=== 2000 census ===
As of the 2000 census, there were 309 people, 117 households, and 80 families living in the town. The population density was 313.2 people per square mile (120.5/km^{2}). There were 135 housing units at an average density of 136.8 per square mile (52.7/km^{2}). The racial makeup of the town was 91.91% White, 3.56% Native American, 0.65% Asian, 1.62% from other races, and 2.27% from two or more races. Hispanic or Latino of any race were 2.91% of the population.

There were 117 households, out of which 35.0% had children under the age of 18 living with them, 47.0% were married couples living together, 11.1% had a female householder with no husband present, and 30.8% were non-families. 20.5% of all households were made up of individuals, and 2.6% had someone living alone who was 65 years of age or older. The average household size was 2.64 and the average family size was 2.91.

In the town, the age distribution of the population shows 27.8% under the age of 18, 6.1% from 18 to 24, 34.3% from 25 to 44, 23.6% from 45 to 64, and 8.1% who were 65 years of age or older. The median age was 36 years. For every 100 females, there were 127.2 males. For every 100 females age 18 and over, there were 123.0 males.

The median income for a household in the town was $31,500, and the median income for a family was $34,063. Males had a median income of $33,542 versus $22,969 for females. The per capita income for the town was $13,531. About 21.2% of families and 22.8% of the population were below the poverty line, including 28.0% of those under the age of eighteen and none of those 65 or over.

== Education ==
The town is served by the Sedro-Woolley School District.
