= KSOR =

Jefferson Public Radio station in Ashland, Oregon

Coordinates: 42.692°N 123.230°W

- Ashland, Oregon; United States
- Frequency: 90.1 MHz (HD Radio)
- Branding: Jefferson Public Radio

Programming
- Format: Public radio; news, classical music
- Affiliations: National Public Radio; American Public Media; Public Radio Exchange

Ownership
- Owner: Southern Oregon University

History
- First air date: 1969

Technical information
- Licensing authority: FCC
- Facility ID: 50622
- Class: C
- ERP: 38,000 watts
- HAAT: 810 meters (2,660 ft)

Links
- Public license information: Public file; LMS
- Webcast: Listen live
- Website: www.ijpr.org

KSOR (90.1 FM) is a National Public Radio member station licensed to Ashland, Oregon. The station is owned by Southern Oregon University, and is an affiliate of Jefferson Public Radio. It is the flagship of JPR's "Classics & News" service, consisting of news and classical music programming.

KSOR was the original station in what would become JPR, signing on in 1969.
