= KQBM (FM) =

- San Andreas, California; United States
- Frequency: 90.7 MHz
- Branding: KQBM 90.7 FM

Programming
- Format: Variety

Ownership
- Owner: Blue Mountain Coalition for Youth and Families
- Sister stations: KQBM-LP

Technical information
- Licensing authority: FCC
- Facility ID: 176193
- Class: A
- ERP: 100 watts
- HAAT: 475 metres (1,558 ft)
- Transmitter coordinates: 38°01′23″N 120°35′26″W

Links
- Public license information: Public file; LMS
- Webcast: Listen Live
- Website: Official Website

KQBM (90.7 FM) is a radio station licensed to serve the community of San Andreas, California. The station is owned by Blue Mountain Coalition for Youth and Families and airs a variety format.

The station was assigned the KQBM call letters by the Federal Communications Commission on February 20, 2011.
