= WPGT (FM) =

- Lake City, Florida; United States
- Frequency: 90.1 MHz
- Branding: Grace Life Radio

Programming
- Format: Religious

Ownership
- Owner: Grace Church of Lake City Inc

Technical information
- Licensing authority: FCC
- Facility ID: 169752
- Class: A
- ERP: 700 watts
- HAAT: 34 meters (112 ft)
- Transmitter coordinates: 30°10′46″N 82°42′49″W

Links
- Public license information: Public file; LMS
- Website: gracelifelc.com

WPGT (90.1 FM) is a radio station licensed to serve the community of Lake City, Florida. The station is owned by Grace Church of Lake City Inc. It airs a religious format.

The station was assigned the WPGT call letters by the Federal Communications Commission on November 3, 2010.
