= KSSR-FM =

- Santa Rosa, New Mexico; United States
- Frequency: 95.9 MHz
- Branding: The Lion

Programming
- Format: Variety

Ownership
- Owner: Esquibel LLC

History
- First air date: 1999
- Former call signs: KAWP (1997, CP); KRSR (1997–2002); KIVA (2002–2009); KKJY (2009–2010)

Technical information
- Licensing authority: FCC
- Facility ID: 84190
- Class: C2
- ERP: 50,000 watts
- HAAT: 24 meters (79 ft)
- Transmitter coordinates: 34°56′47″N 104°39′10″W

Links
- Public license information: Public file; LMS
- Webcast: Listen live
- Website: kssrradio.com

KSSR-FM (95.9 FM) is a radio station licensed to Santa Rosa, New Mexico, United States. The station broadcasts a variety format and is owned by Esquibel LLC.

== Programming ==
KSSR offers a variety of shows from a variety of genres including AT40 with Ryan Seacrest, Bob Kingsley's Country Top 40 on Saturdays, Explicitly Old School with T-Boz weekdays, and even a Spanish-speaking radio show on Sunday mornings.
