= KRMB =

- Bisbee, Arizona; United States
- Broadcast area: Sierra Vista, Arizona
- Frequency: 90.1 MHz
- Branding: Radio Cadena Manantial

Programming
- Language: Spanish
- Format: Christian radio

Ownership
- Owner: World Radio Network, Inc.

History
- First air date: 1997

Technical information
- Licensing authority: FCC
- Facility ID: 73746
- Class: A
- ERP: 115 watts
- HAAT: 673.0 meters (2,208.0 ft)
- Transmitter coordinates: 31°28′54″N 109°57′35″W

Links
- Public license information: Public file; LMS
- Website: www.worldradionetwork.org

KRMB (90.1 FM) is a Spanish language Christian radio station licensed to Bisbee, Arizona. KRMB serves the Sierra Vista, Arizona area, and is owned by World Radio Network, Inc.
