= KQEZ =

Adult contemporary radio station in St. Regis, Montana, US

Coordinates: 47°22′20″N 114°51′28″W

- St. Regis, Montana; United States
- Broadcast area: Plains, Montana; Superior, Montana; Thompson Falls, Montana
- Frequency: 99.3 MHz
- Branding: 99.3 The River

Programming
- Format: Adult contemporary

Ownership
- Owner: Anderson Radio Broadcasting, Inc.

History
- First air date: 2009
- Former call signs: KHZS (2006–2008, CP); KZJZ (2008–2018); KVGN (2018–2019)
- Former frequencies: 99.1 MHz (2009–2018)

Technical information
- Licensing authority: FCC
- Facility ID: 164303
- Class: C2
- ERP: 930 watts
- HAAT: 867 meters (2,844 ft)

Links
- Public license information: Public file; LMS

KQEZ is a radio station airing an adult contemporary format licensed to St. Regis, Montana, broadcasting on 99.3 FM. The station serves the areas of Plains, Montana; Superior, Montana; and Thompson Falls, Montana, and is owned by Anderson Radio Broadcasting, Inc.
