= KSLV-FM =

- Del Norte, Colorado; United States
- Frequency: 96.5 MHz
- Branding: 96.5 The Fox

Programming
- Format: Classic rock
- Affiliations: AP Radio, Westwood One

Ownership
- Owner: Jeanne Sue Sakers and Robert Trigilio, Jr.; (Buffalo Broadcasting of Colorado, LLC)
- Sister stations: KBGV, KYDN

History
- First air date: 2008
- Former call signs: KYDN (2007–2008)

Technical information
- Licensing authority: FCC
- Facility ID: 164123
- Class: C3
- ERP: 930 watts
- HAAT: 484.6 meters (1,590 ft)
- Transmitter coordinates: 37°43′47″N 106°35′18″W

Links
- Public license information: Public file; LMS
- Webcast: Listen live
- Website: 965thefoxfm.com

KSLV-FM (96.5 FM, "96.5 The Fox") is a radio station broadcasting a classic rock music format. It is licensed to Del Norte, Colorado, United States. The station is currently owned by Jeanne Sue Sakers and Robert Trigilio, Jr., through licensee Buffalo Broadcasting of Colorado, LLC.

== History ==
The station was assigned the call sign KYDN on July 18, 2007. On September 29, 2008, the station changed its call sign to the current KSLV-FM.
