= 103.3 FM =

FM radio frequency

The following radio stations broadcast on FM frequency 103.3 MHz:

== Argentina ==
- LRM75 Universidad in Rosario, Santa Fe
- Play in Posadas, Misiones

== Australia ==
- 2GCR in Goulburn, New South Wales
- 2KY in Muswellbrook, New South Wales
- 2TLP in Taree, New South Wales
- ABC Classic in Woomera, South Australia
- Mac FM in Perth, Western Australia (106.5 FM as of January 2026)
- Radio National in Mount Gambier, South Australia
- Radio TAB in Cooktown, Queensland
- Radio TAB in Mount Isa, Queensland
- Triple J in Darwin, Northern Territory
- Triple J in Roma, Queensland
- Triple J in Wodonga, Victoria

== Canada (Channel 277) ==
- CBOQ-FM in Ottawa, Ontario
- CBZC-FM in Bon Accord, New Brunswick
- CFPF-FM in Banff, Alberta
- CHAA-FM in Longueuil, Quebec
- CHFA-5-FM in Grande Prairie, Alberta
- CJAT-FM-2 in Grand Forks, British Columbia
- CKCI-FM in Sarnia, Ontario
- CKDY-1-FM in Weymouth, Nova Scotia
- CKLP-FM in Parry Sound, Ontario
- CKQV-FM in Vermilion Bay, Ontario
- VF2352 in Granisle, British Columbia
- VOAR-7-FM in Springdale, Newfoundland and Labrador

== Chile ==
- Tele13 Radio in Santiago, Chile

== Ireland ==
- C103 – transmitter for west county Cork
- iRadio- Galway City & surroundings

== Israel ==
- Radio Al-Nas in the Northern District

== Malaysia ==
- Radio Klasik in North Perak, Padang Rengas, Kuala Kangsar and Central Perak
- ERA in Kota Bharu, Kelantan, Klang Valley, Western Pahang, South Perak and Hilir Perak
- Minnal FM in Kuantan, Pahang, South Terengganu, Malacca and North Johor
- Melody in Johor Bahru, Johor and Singapore

== Mexico ==
- XERFR-FM in Mexico City
- XHAHU-FM in Ciudad Anáhuac, Nuevo León
- XHCCBK-FM in Tepic, Nayarit
- XHCPAF-FM in Iguala, Guerrero
- XHENA-FM in Ensenada, Baja California
- XHFU-FM in Cosamaloapan, Veracruz
- XHIH-FM in Fresnillo, Zacatecas
- XHMICH-FM in Morelia, Michoacán
- XHNAR-FM in Linares, Nuevo León
- XHNW-FM in Culiacán, Sinaloa
- XHPCCC-FM in Ciudad Cuauhtémoc, Chihuahua
- XHRH-FM in Puebla, Puebla
- XHRKS-FM in Reynosa, Tamaulipas
- XHSJ-FM in Saltillo, Coahuila
- XHSQ-FM in San Miguel de Allende, Guanajuato
- XHVG-FM in Mexicali, Baja California
- XHVILL-FM in Villahermosa, Tabasco
- XHVJS-FM in Villa Juárez, Sonora
- XHZL-FM in Xalapa, Veracruz

== Philippines ==
- DXJL in Cagayan de Oro City

== Sierra Leone ==
- Capital Radio in Makeni

== United Kingdom ==
- Clyde 1 in the Firth of Clyde
- Heart East in Milton Keynes
- London Greek Radio in London
- Nevis Radio in Oban
- Greatest Hits Radio Derbyshire in the Peak District
- Heart Scotland in Penicuik
- Nation Radio Wales in Aberystwyth

== United States (Channel 277) ==
- KATM in Modesto, California
- KAZR in Pella, Iowa
- KBAA in Grass Valley, California
- KBEN-FM in Cowley, Wyoming
- KBIU in Lake Charles, Louisiana
- KCMU-LP in Napa, California
- KCRS in Midland, Texas
- KDFM in Falfurrias, Texas
- KDRF in Albuquerque, New Mexico
- KDTR in Florence, Montana
- KFTZ in Idaho Falls, Idaho
- KFUZ-LP in Clarkston, Washington
- KHSM in McKinleyville, California
- KIGG in Igiugig, Alaska
- KIQN in Colorado City, Colorado
- KIXB in El Dorado, Arkansas
- KJCS (FM) in Nacogdoches, Texas
- KJLS in Hays, Kansas
- KJSR in Tulsa, Oklahoma
- KKCW in Beaverton, Oregon
- KLER in Orofino, Idaho
- KLOU in Saint Louis, Missouri
- KOBV-LP in Bentonville, Arkansas
- KOFP-LP in Fresno, California
- KPCA-LP in Petaluma, California
- KPRS in Kansas City, Missouri
- KPRU in Delta, Colorado
- KQWF-LP in Wichita Falls, Texas
- KRAN in Warren AFB, Wyoming
- KRUZ in Santa Barbara, California
- KRWP in Pampa, Texas
- KSAG in Pearsall, Texas
- KSCU in Santa Clara, California
- KTFC (FM) in Sioux City, Iowa
- KTMQ in Temecula, California
- KUKI-FM in Ukiah, California
- KUSB in Hazelton, North Dakota
- KUVB-LP in Leavenworth, Washington
- KVDT in Allen, Texas
- KWBU in Waco, Texas
- KWLN in Wilson Creek, Washington
- KWOZ in Mountain View, Arkansas
- KWPQ-LP in Springfield, Missouri
- KZCR in Fergus Falls, Minnesota
- KZCV-LP in Baytown, Texas
- KZKE in Seligman, Arizona
- KZNW in Oak Harbor, Washington
- KZPO in Lindsay, California
- WAKG in Danville, Virginia
- WARM in York, Pennsylvania
- WAVJ in Waterbury, Vermont
- WAXL in Santa Claus, Indiana
- WBGB in Boston, Massachusetts
- WBZL (FM) in Greenwood, Mississippi
- WCRF in Cleveland, Ohio
- WDSE in Duluth, Minnesota
- WEDG in Buffalo, New York
- WESR in Onley-Onancock, Virginia
- WFXD in Marquette, Michigan
- WGLX in Wisconsin Rapids, Wisconsin
- WGVR-LP in Gainesville, Florida
- WIVQ in Spring Valley, Illinois
- WJMX in Cheraw, South Carolina
- WJOD in Asbury, Iowa
- WKDF in Nashville, Tennessee
- WKFR in Battle Creek, Michigan
- WKMZ in Salem, West Virginia
- WKQL in Brookville, Pennsylvania
- WKVS in Lenoir, North Carolina
- WLSE in Canton, Illinois
- WLTS in Greer, South Carolina
- WMCM in Rockland, Maine
- WMGV in Newport, North Carolina
- WMLX in Saint Marys, Ohio
- WMXS in Montgomery, Alabama
- WMXW in Vestal, New York
- WOLT in Indianapolis, Indiana
- WPRB in Princeton, New Jersey
- WQGA in Waycross, Georgia
- WQLB in Tawas City, Michigan
- WQQQ in Sharon, Connecticut
- WRQQ in Hammond, Louisiana
- WSFM-LP in Asheville, North Carolina
- WSJG-LP in Tiffin, Ohio
- WSPJ-LP in Syracuse, New York
- WTCF in Wardensville, West Virginia
- WTCR in Huntington, West Virginia
- WTUS-LP in Tuscaloosa, Alabama
- WVEE in Atlanta, Georgia
- WVJP in Caguas, Puerto Rico
- WVYB in Holly Hill, Florida
- WXCZ in Cedar Key, Florida
- WXOJ-LP in Northampton, Massachusetts
- WXTZ-LP in Yadkinville, North Carolina
- WXZZ in Georgetown, Kentucky
- WZDF-LP in Merritt Island, Florida
- WZKR in Collinsville, Mississippi
- WZND-LP in Bloomington, Illinois
