= Mass media in Dodge City, Kansas =

Dodge City, Kansas is a center of media in southwestern Kansas. The following is a list of media outlets based in the city.

== Print ==
=== Newspapers ===
- The Dodge City Daily Globe, daily
- The Southwest Kansas Register, weekly, published by the Roman Catholic Diocese of Dodge City

=== Magazines ===
- High Plains Journal, weekly

== Radio ==
The following radio stations are licensed to and/or broadcast from Dodge City:

=== AM ===
Frequency	Callsign	Format	City of License	Notes
1370	KGNO	Talk	Dodge City, Kansas	-
1550	KDCC	Variety	Dodge City, Kansas	DCCC college radio

=== FM ===
Frequency	Callsign	Format	City of License	Notes
89.9	KAIG	Christian Contemporary	Dodge City, Kansas	Air1
91.9	KONQ	Variety	Dodge City, Kansas	DCCC college radio
92.9	KMML	Regional Mexican	Cimarron, Kansas	Broadcasts from Dodge City
93.9	KZRD	Rock	Dodge City, Kansas	-
95.5	KAHE	Oldies	Dodge City, Kansas	-
96.3	KERP	Country	Ingalls, Kansas	Broadcasts from Dodge City
102.1	KODC-LP	Religious	Dodge City, Kansas	-

== Television ==
Dodge City is in the Wichita-Hutchinson, Kansas television market. The following television stations are licensed to and/or broadcast from Dodge City:

Display Channel	Network	Callsign	City of License	Notes
6.1	CBS	KBSD-DT	Ensign, Kansas	Broadcasts from Dodge City; Satellite station of KWCH-DT, Wichita, Kansas
6.2	-	KBSD-DT	Ensign, Kansas	Local weather
21.1	PBS (SD)	KDCK	Dodge City, Kansas	Satellite station of KOOD, Bunker Hill, Kansas; 21.3 and 21.4 off-air 6:00 p.m. to 12:00 a.m.
21.2	PBS (HD)	KDCK	Dodge City, Kansas	Satellite station of KOOD, Bunker Hill, Kansas; 21.3 and 21.4 off-air 6:00 p.m. to 12:00 a.m.
21.3	Create	KDCK	Dodge City, Kansas	Satellite station of KOOD, Bunker Hill, Kansas; 21.3 and 21.4 off-air 6:00 p.m. to 12:00 a.m.
21.4	World	KDCK	Dodge City, Kansas	Satellite station of KOOD, Bunker Hill, Kansas; 21.3 and 21.4 off-air 6:00 p.m. to 12:00 a.m.
23.1	Retro TV	KDDC-LD	Dodge City, Kansas	Translator of KDGL-LD, Sublette, Kansas
23.2	Tuff TV	KDDC-LD	Dodge City, Kansas	Translator of KDGL-LD, Sublette, Kansas
23.3	AMGTV	KDDC-LD	Dodge City, Kansas	Translator of KDGL-LD, Sublette, Kansas
23.4	Launch TV	KDDC-LD	Dodge City, Kansas	Translator of KDGL-LD, Sublette, Kansas
23.5	TheWalk TV	KDDC-LD	Dodge City, Kansas	Translator of KDGL-LD, Sublette, Kansas
23.6	PBJ	KDDC-LD	Dodge City, Kansas	Translator of KDGL-LD, Sublette, Kansas
29.1	FOX	KSAS-LP	Dodge City, Kansas	Translator of KSAS-TV, Wichita, Kansas
29.2	Antenna TV	KSAS-LP	Dodge City, Kansas	Translator of KSAS-TV, Wichita, Kansas
