= KSMM =

KSMM may refer to:

- KSMM (AM), a radio station (1470 AM) licensed to Liberal, Kansas, United States
- KSMM-FM, a radio station (101.5 FM) licensed to Liberal, Kansas
- KQSP, a radio station (1530 AM) licensed to Shakopee, Minnesota, United States, which used the call sign KSMM until March 1987 and from September 1998 to September 2006
