= KCMU =

KCMU may refer to:

- KCMU-LP, a low-power radio station (103.3 FM) licensed to serve Napa, California, United States
- KEXP-FM, a radio station (90.3 FM) licensed to serve Seattle, Washington, United States, which held the call sign KCMU-FM from 1972 to 2001
