= KSLT =

Contemporary Christian radio station in Spearfish, South Dakota

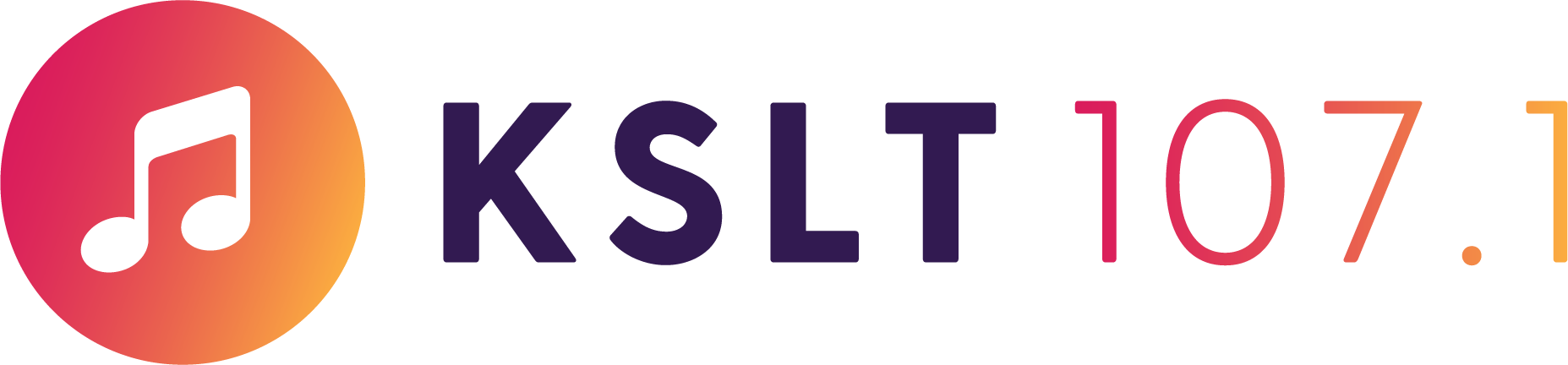
- Spearfish, South Dakota; United States
- Broadcast area: Rapid City, South Dakota
- Frequency: 107.1 MHz
- Branding: KSLT 107.1

Programming
- Format: Christian adult contemporary

Ownership
- Owner: Northwestern Media; (University of Northwestern – St. Paul)
- Sister stations: KLMP, KSLP, KSLS, KLBF

History
- First air date: February 17, 1984; 42 years ago (at 107.3)
- Former frequencies: 107.3 MHz (1984–2011)

Technical information
- Licensing authority: FCC
- Facility ID: 5475
- Class: C
- ERP: 100,000 watts
- HAAT: 579 meters (1,900 ft)
- Transmitter coordinates: 44°19′42″N 103°50′3″W
- Repeaters: 107.1 KSLT-FM1 (Rapid City)

Links
- Public license information: Public file; LMS
- Webcast: Listen Live
- Website: kslt.com

KSLT (107.1 MHz), is a radio station licensed to Spearfish, South Dakota, United States, serving Rapid City, South Dakota and the surrounding region with a Christian adult contemporary format. The station is currently owned by the University of Northwestern – St. Paul.

On October 24, 2011 KSLT moved from 107.3 FM to 107.1 FM.

An asset purchase agreement filed with the FCC on October 29, 2021 says Northwestern Media is buying KLMP/88.3 (Rapid City, South Dakota) and KSLT/107.1 (Spearfish-Rapid City, South Dakota) from Bethesda Christian Broadcasting for $249,000. The deal also includes KSLT satellites KSLP/90.3 (Pierre, South Dakota) and KSLS/90.7 (Dickinson, North Dakota) and boosters KLMP-1/KSLT-1 in Rapid City and translator K292DN in Newcastle, Wyoming. KLMP and KSLT fit in with Northwestern’s existing stations, which all carry either Adult Contemporary Christian or teaching and preaching from the Faith Radio Network. Bethesda Christian Broadcasting's KTPT (Rapid City, South Dakota) and KSLT/KSLP translators owned by the International Church of the Foursquare Gospel are not included in the transaction.

Northwestern Media closed on its purchase of KLMP/88.3 (Rapid City) and KSLT/107.1 (Spearfish-Rapid City) from Bethesda Christian Broadcasting on January 31, 2022.

== Translators ==
KSLT is also heard on full power stations KSLP 90.3 in Fort Pierre, South Dakota and KSLS 90.7 in Dickinson, North Dakota, as well as five low powered translators in South Dakota, Nebraska, and Wyoming.

KSLS was previously the call sign of an FM radio station in Liberal, Kansas—part of the "LS Network" of radio entrepreneur Larry Steckline. The Federal Communications Commission assigned the Kansas station the call sign KSLS on April 10, 1978, but changed its call sign to KSMM on February 15, 2008.

=== Full powered stations ===
Call sign	Frequency	City of license	FID	ERP (W)	Class	FCC info
KSLP	90.3 FM	Fort Pierre, South Dakota	174271	2,000	A	LMS
KSLS	90.7 FM	Dickinson, North Dakota	174276	3,400	A	LMS

=== Translators ===
Call sign	Frequency	City of license	FID	ERP (W)	Class	FCC info
K219LV	91.7 FM	Hemingford, Nebraska	29891	36	D	LMS
K274CC	102.7 FM	New England, North Dakota	29897	50	D	LMS
K292DN	106.3 FM	Newcastle, Wyoming	5474	31	D	LMS
K293BN	106.5 FM	Bowman, North Dakota	29894	92	D	LMS
K295BR	106.9 FM	Dickinson, North Dakota	29896	115	D	LMS
K239DC	107.1 FM	Alliance, Nebraska	29912	74	D	LMS

== Previous logo ==
(KSLT's logo under previous 107.3 frequency)
(KSLT's logo 2011-2020)
