= KYUU =

KYUU may refer to:

- The number nine in Japanese
- KSMM (AM), a radio station (1470 AM) licensed to Liberal, Kansas, United States, which used the call sign KYUU from October 1988 to February 2008
- KMVQ-FM, a former NBC owned and operated radio station (99.7 FM) licensed to San Francisco, California, United States, which used the call sign KYUU-FM from 1978 to October 1988.
- KYUU-LD, a television station (channel 35) licensed to Boise, Idaho, United States
- Kyū, a Japanese system for designating levels of ability
