= KSMM-FM =

Radio station in Liberal, Kansas

- Liberal, Kansas; United States
- Frequency: 101.5 MHz
- Branding: La Mexicana 101.5

Programming
- Format: Regional Mexican

Ownership
- Owner: Kansas Broadcast Company, LLC
- Sister stations: KERP, KZRD, KAHE, KGNO

History
- First air date: July 1978
- Former call signs: KSLS (1978–2008)

Technical information
- Licensing authority: FCC
- Facility ID: 37120
- Class: C1
- ERP: 100,000 watts
- HAAT: 165 meters (541 ft)
- Transmitter coordinates: 37°03′20″N 100°48′40″W

Links
- Public license information: Public file; LMS
- Webcast: Listen live
- Website: swksradio.net/ksmm

KSMM-FM (101.5 FM) is a radio station licensed to serve the community of Liberal, Kansas, United States. The station is owned by Kansas Broadcast Company, LLC. It airs a Regional Mexican music format.

The station was assigned the call sign KSLS by the Federal Communications Commission on April 10, 1978. In the 1980s, under that call sign, it was part of the "LS Network" of Kansas radio entrepreneur Larry Steckline. The station changed its call sign to KSMM-FM on February 15, 2008.
