= KVPC =

Coordinates: 44.328°N 103.835°W

Rapid City, South Dakota; United States
- Broadcast area: Rapid City, South Dakota
- Frequency: 97.9 MHz

Programming
- Format: Christian radio
- Affiliations: VCY America

Ownership
- Owner: VCY America, Inc.

History
- First air date: November 7, 1968
- Former call signs: KVSR (1968–1992); KLMP (1992–2007); KTPT (2007–2023)

Technical information
- Licensing authority: FCC
- Facility ID: 21637
- Class: C
- ERP: 100,000 watts
- HAAT: 579 meters (1,900 ft)

Links
- Public license information: Public file; LMS
- Webcast: Listen Live
- Website: http://www.vcyamerica.org/

KVPC is a radio station in Rapid City, South Dakota, United States. The license is owned by VCY America, Inc.

The station began broadcasting in 1968 as KVSR and is the oldest FM station in the city. It has offered religious programming for more than 50 years under various owners.

== History ==
On May 31, 1967, John W. Larson, a rancher from Kiron, Iowa, with no prior radio experience, filed with the Federal Communications Commission (FCC) to build a new FM radio station in Rapid City. A construction permit was issued on December 7 of that year, and KVSR, Rapid City's "Voice of Sacred Radio", made its debut on November 7, 1968, as the only FM outlet in Rapid City, offering sacred and classical music as well as news and Bible features. Studios were co-located with the tower on Skyline Drive, a ridge offering good coverage of the area. Six months after signing on, Larson leased the station to Don Swanson, another Iowan who had started KTFC, a similar station in Sioux City, Iowa. Larson sold KVSR outright to Swanson in 1973, a deal that received FCC approval the next year. The broadcast day gradually extended until 24-hour programming began in 1985.

Swanson sold KVSR after 23 years of involvement to Fischer Broadcasting Partners, owned by a husband and wife, in 1992. Fischer changed the call letters to KLMP. Four years later, Fischer sold the station to Bethesda Christian Broadcasting, owner of Christian station KSLT in Spearfish; upon the new owners taking control, they temporarily pulled programming and played versions of the hymn "Amazing Grace". KSLT would move its studios from Spearfish to Rapid City in 1998, joining its sister station; KLMP also moved its transmitter to its present Terry Peak site, improving coverage.

Bethesda expanded to a third station, this time in the noncommercial reserved band, when KTPT (88.3 FM) debuted in February 2005 as a Christian contemporary hit radio station known as "The Point". On April 28, 2007, Bethesda switched KLMP to 88.3 and KTPT to 97.9; a booster was also added to improve coverage in Rapid City proper.

On January 4, 2016, KTPT flipped to contemporary worship music and re-branded itself as "97.9 The Breeze", in response to the rising popularity of worship music and the failure of The Point to catch on with its target audience of people 18–34.

Bethesda began to exit broadcasting in 2021 when it announced the sale of KLMP and KSLT, as well as two high-power repeaters of KSLT and two translators, to Northwestern Media for $249,000. When Northwestern closed on that purchase in February 2022, Bethesda announced it would sell KTPT. In an announcement, Bethesda noted, "It was a difficult decision that was ultimately out of our control. But we know we serve a God who is never taken off guard." On April 14, 2022, an equipment failure took KTPT off the air.

Bethesda filed with the FCC on November 9, 2022, to sell KTPT to VCY America for $275,000. The sale was consummated on February 14, 2023, with the call sign changing simultaneously to KVPC.
