= Cheryl Waters =

Cheryl Waters may refer to:

- Cheryl Waters (actress) (1947–2025), American film and television actress
- Cheryl Waters (radio personality), American radio host and disk jockey
