= KOFP =

KOFP may refer to:

- Hanover County Municipal Airport (ICAO code KOFP)
- KOFP-LP, a low-power radio station (103.3 FM) licensed to serve Fresno, California, United States
