= KMML (disambiguation) =

KMML may refer to:

- KMML is a radio station (92.9 FM) licensed to serve Cimarron, Kansas, United States
- Kerala Minerals and Metals is a titanium dioxide manufacturing company in the city of Kollam, India
- Southwest Minnesota Regional Airport (ICAO code KMML)
