= KNGS =

KNGS may refer to:

- KNGS-LP, a low-power radio station (104.5 FM) licensed to serve Hanford, California, United States
- KIGS, a radio station (620 AM) licensed to serve Hanford, California, which held the call sign KNGS from 1948 to 1987
- Kings Norton Girls' School
