= KTFC =

KTFC may refer to:

- KTFC (FM), a radio station (103.3 FM) licensed to Sioux City, Iowa, United States
- Kendal Tornado F.C.
- Kendal Town F.C.
- Kettering Town F.C.
