= KZPO =

- Lindsay, California; United States
- Broadcast area: Visalia-Tulare-Hanford-Delano
- Frequency: 103.3 MHz

Ownership
- Owner: Estate of Linda Ware
- Sister stations: KNGS-LP

History
- First air date: January 30, 1998
- Last air date: December 2019

Technical information
- Facility ID: 37725
- Class: B1
- ERP: 280 watts
- HAAT: 800 meters (2,600 ft)
- Transmitter coordinates: 36°17′14″N 118°50′17″W

KZPO (103.3 FM) was a radio station broadcasting classic nostalgia hits from the 1940s to the 1970s. It was self-identified as the nostalgia station. Licensed to Lindsay, California, USA, it served the Visalia-Tulare-Hanford area of Tulare, Kings and Kern Counties. The station had been in the control of the executor of the estate of Linda Ware since 2004.

== History ==
In a March 2011 storm, the KZPO transmitter at Blue Ridge was knocked out, along with a few other stations. The station was back on the air and could be heard from the north Fresno County area south to the south Kern County line – "Grapevine" area along Interstate 5 into Gorman.

KZPO's license was turned in to the FCC in December 2019. It was also deleted by July 2020.
