= XHVILL-FM =

Radio station in Villahermosa, Tabasco

- Villahermosa, Tabasco; Mexico
- Broadcast area: Villahermosa, Tabasco
- Frequency: 103.3 MHz
- Branding: 103.3 FM

Programming
- Format: Grupera

Ownership
- Owner: Guilbot family (pending sale to Grupo Radiorama); (Radio XEVILL, S.A. de C.V.)

History
- First air date: December 13, 1988 (concession)
- Call sign meaning: Villahermosa

Technical information
- Class: B1
- ERP: 25 kW
- Transmitter coordinates: 17°56′57″N 92°54′52″W

Links
- Webcast: Listen live
- Website: audiorama.mx

XHVILL-FM is a radio station on 103.3 FM in Villahermosa, Tabasco, Mexico. It is operated by Grupo Audiorama Comunicaciones and carries its 103.3 FM grupera format.

== History ==
XEVILL-AM 650 received its concession on December 13, 1988. It was owned by Alberto Guilbot Serros and soon after transferred to its current concessionaire.

XEVILL migrated to FM in 2010. For many years, it was operated by Grupo ACIR, last as "103.3 Noticias", one of the last news/talk stations owned by the group. The format came to an end on August 3, 2020, when ACIR's main news and sports programs for Villahermosa moved to XHSAT-FM 90.1.

On February 24, 2025, XHVILL returned to the air under the management of Grupo Audiorama Comunicaciones with its Buenísima grupera format.
