= XHSQ-FM =

XHSQ Radio San Miguel
- San Miguel de Allende, Guanajuato; Mexico
- Frequency: 103.3 MHz
- Branding: Radio San Miguel

Programming
- Format: Full service

Ownership
- Owner: Radio San Miguel, S.A.

History
- First air date: August 26, 1961

Technical information
- ERP: 6 kW
- Transmitter coordinates: 20°51′44.3″N 100°45′14.3″W

Links
- Webcast: Listen live
- Website: sqradiosanmiguel.com

XHSQ-FM is a radio station on 103.3 FM in San Miguel de Allende, Guanajuato, Mexico. XHSQ is known as Radio San Miguel and carries a local full service schedule.

== History ==
XHSQ began as XESQ-AM 1280 and signed on August 26, 1961. XESQ was owned by Gen. Ramón Rodríguez Familiar, the former governor of the adjoining state of Querétaro who had gotten into the radio business. Local programming immediately started, including news and musical shows, and two months later, the station received its concession.

In 1970, a locally based company bought XESQ and its concession. The station moved to new facilities and took on the name Radio San Miguel. Manuel Zavala, who had been hosting programs on XESQ since its inception, became station manager. XESQ received approval to migrate to FM in March 2011.

XESQ-XHSQ is tightly integrated into XHGSM-TV channel 4, a local noncommercial television station that received its permit in 2000.
