= Cheryl Waters (radio personality) =

American radio host and disc jockey

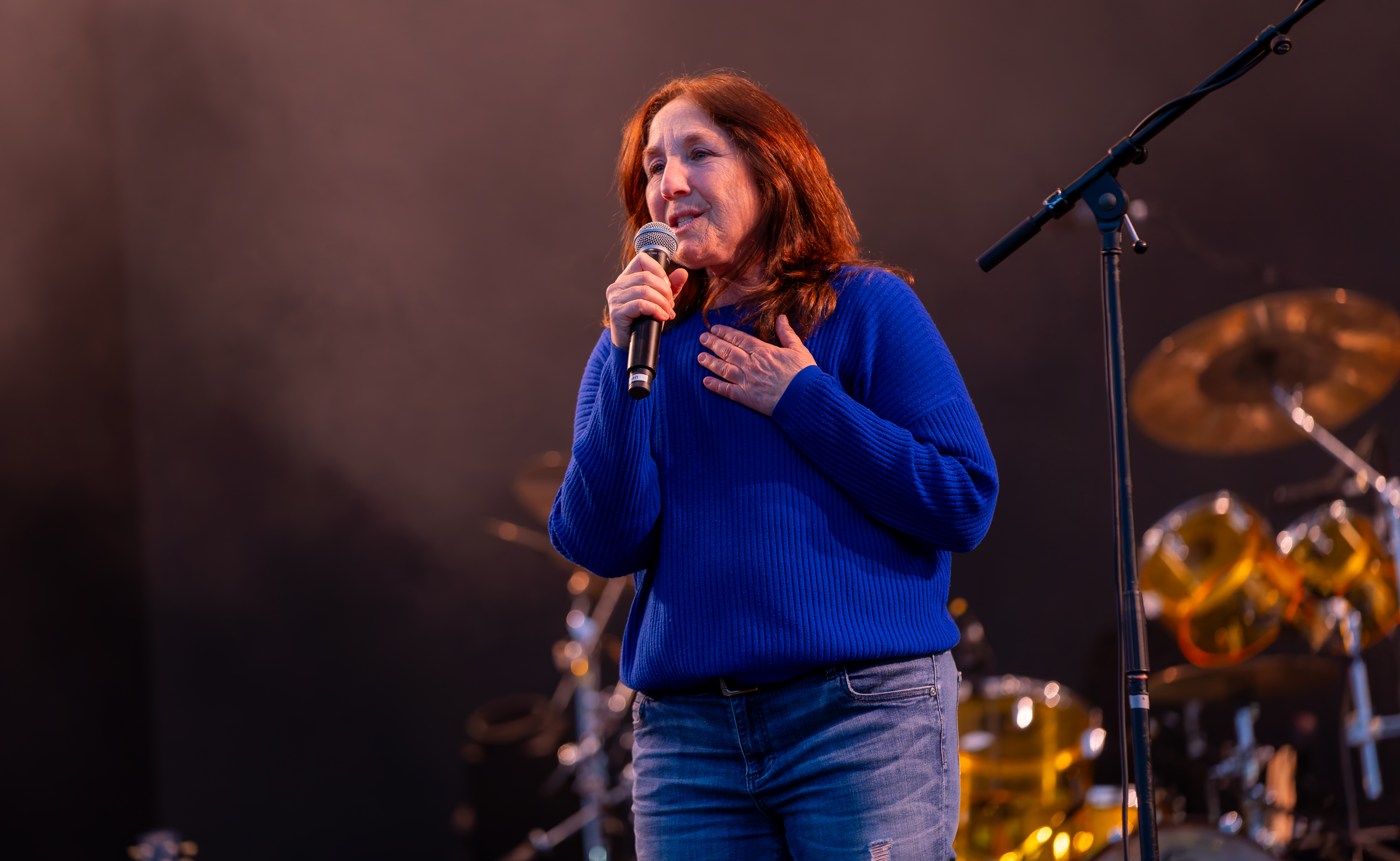
- Waters at Wide Awake Festival 2024
- Born: January 7
- Presenting career
- Show: The Mid Day Show
- Station: KEXP-FM
- Time slot: 10 a.m. – 1 p.m. Monday–Friday

Cheryl Waters (born January 7) is an American radio host and disc jockey at KEXP 90.3FM. At KEXP, she is the host of The Mid Day Show, and has received recognition for her work as KEXP's on-air events coordinator. She was also the music critic for NPR's KUOW-FM for over ten years.

== Career ==
Before her career in radio, Waters attained a degree in environmental science, and worked as an environmental consultant for the council of King County, Washington. In April 1994, she started working as a volunteer at the University of Washington's KCMU radio station (later renamed "KEXP"), working in the DJ booth from 1 a.m. to 6 a.m. every Saturday morning, while retaining her job as an environmental consultant part-time.

In 1999, she started working full-time at KEXP. Since 2005, she has hosted The Mid Day Show, running from 10 a.m. to 2 p.m. every Monday to Friday, where she selects songs to play, interacts with listeners, and discusses music. Waters also works as KEXP's on-air events coordinator, booking and interviewing bands for live performances. Crosscut described her work curating bands for KEXP's live performances as having "helped craft KEXP's identity as the independent tastemaker for alternative and emerging music." Videos of band's live performances which she hosts have been popular – collectively gaining billions of views on YouTube – leading to Waters' wider recognition outside of the Seattle music scene in which KEXP operates.

== Experience with cancer ==
In 2013, Waters was diagnosed with triple-negative breast cancer. She underwent a year of chemotherapy in which she paused her full-time work at KEXP but continued hosting her four-hour Mid Day Show, and had a hysterectomy and double mastectomy. In 2019, Waters was again diagnosed with cancer. She underwent surgery to remove a cancerous growth on her tongue and swollen lymph nodes from her neck, received additional radiation therapy, and had to take breaks from her radio work as she had difficulty speaking.

Throughout her experience with cancer, Waters has spoken about the benefits music has brought to her; she described music as a "constant companion" and "support system". Waters has helped co-host the "Music Heals" series on KEXP, dedicated to discussing life's hardships (depression, addiction, etc.) and the healing power of music. In "Music Heals: Beyond Cancer", she described her own experiences with cancer on air.

== See also ==
- John Richards (radio personality)
