= XHZL-FM =

Radio station in Xalapa, Veracruz, Mexico

- Xalapa, Veracruz; Mexico
- Frequency: 103.3 FM
- Branding: Lokura FM Grupera

Programming
- Format: Regional Mexican

Ownership
- Owner: Capital Media; (Radiodifusoras Capital, S.A. de C.V.)

History
- First air date: January 22, 1943 (concession)
- Former call signs: XEJW-AM, XEZL-AM
- Former frequencies: 1480 kHz, 1130 kHz

Technical information
- Licensing authority: CRT
- Class: B1
- ERP: 5 kW
- HAAT: 113 m
- Transmitter coordinates: 19°35′14.76″N 97°00′15.48″W

Links
- Webcast: Listen live
- Website: lokura.fm/xalapa

XHZL-FM is a radio station on 103.3 FM in Xalapa, Veracruz. It is owned by CapitalMedia and carries a Regional Mexican format known as Lokura FM Grupera.

== History ==
XEJW-AM 1480 received its concession on January 22, 1943. XEJW was originally owned by Mariano Caraza D., and then sold to Ena Guzmán de Bouchez in 1955, and later to Radiodifusión Moderna in 1965. By then, it was renamed as XEZL-AM and was moved to 1130, broadcasting with 10,000 watts.

XEZL was authorized to migrate to FM in February 2011. The station was further authorized to relocate its transmitter to Acajete, a common location for Xalapa stations, in October 2017. On January 1, 2019, it flipped from pop to Regional Mexican as Capital Máxima; it then flipped to Pirata on January 28, 2020. On June 8, 2020, XHZL was one of seven stations to debut the new Lokura FM Spanish-language adult hits brand. When the Lokura brand was split in 2023, this station switched back to a Regional Mexican format.
