= Riz Rollins =

American disc jockey

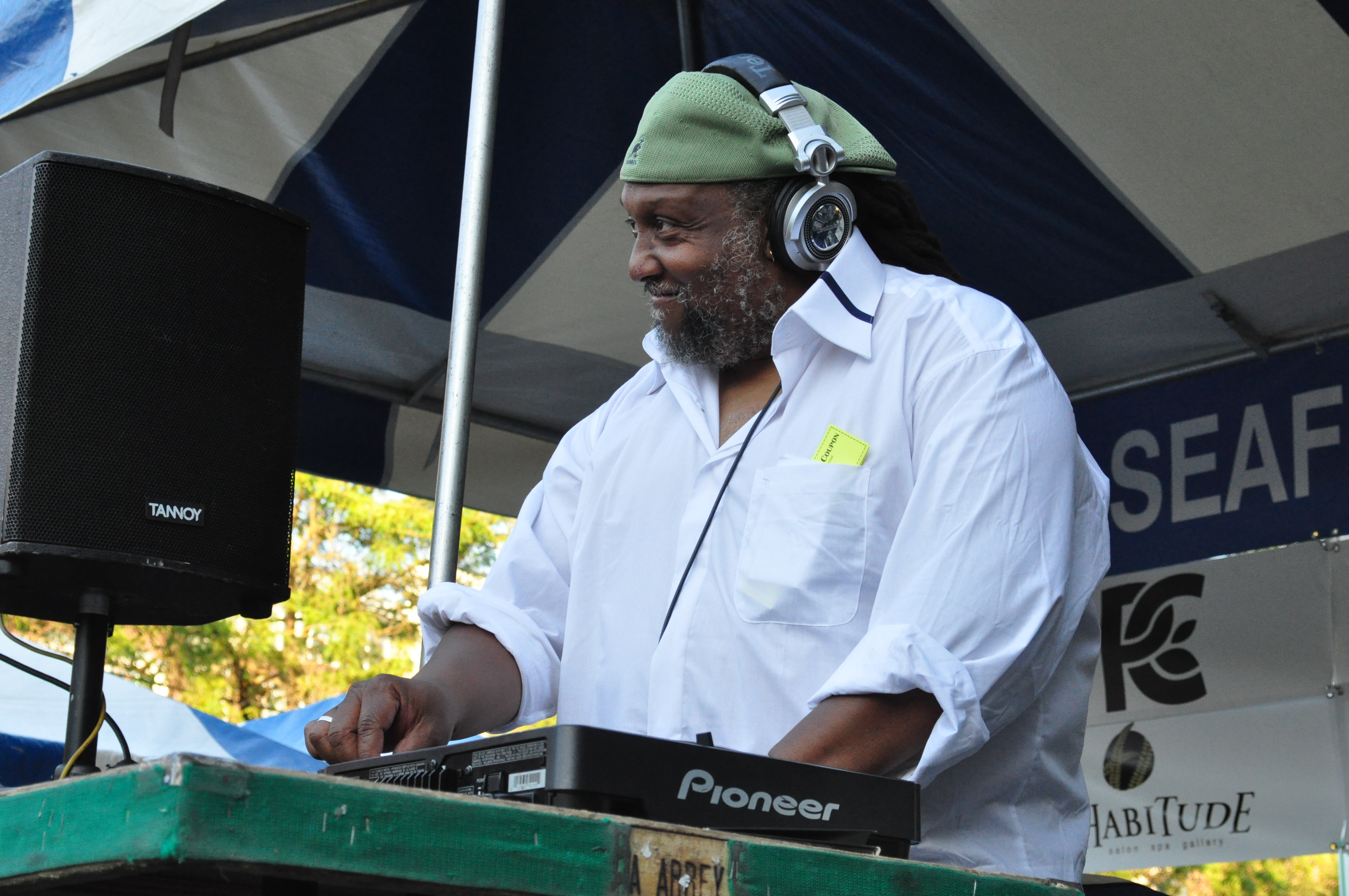
- Born: 1953-54
- Occupation: Disc jockey
- Years active: 1980–present
- Known for: Expansions show on KEXP-FM

Riz Rollins, also known as DJ Riz, is a disc jockey in Seattle. He is known as a radio personality on KEXP-FM and for presenting his radio show there, "Expansions".

Riz is a prominent gay and black public figure in LGBT culture in Seattle. He is known for deejaying at gay venues including Pony and Cuff Complex.

Rollins grew up in Chicago. His mother took him to his first music concert, where performers Dionne Warwick, Gene Chandler and The Temptations influenced his perspective. He sang in the Operation Breadbasket choir. He regularly heard Reverend Jesse Jackson preach. Upon hearing the James Brown song, "Cold Sweat", he felt that it described his life as a poor black youth. He lived in Chicago till age 25. He studied religion and psychology in college.

In a 1992 article, a reviewer of radio shows on KCMU-FM (now KEXP-FM) said that Rollins was one of the people who defined the culture of the station.

In the 1990s when Rollins began deejaying in Seattle, he played artists including Jungle Brothers, A Tribe Called Quest, Queen Latifah, The Pharcyde, and De La Soul. When Seattle Art Museum profiled Rollins in 2018, he cited Kerry James Marshall as an inspiration. In a profile of the black arts scene in Seattle, Rollins commented that it is more vibrant than many people are aware. Rollins likes Espresso Vivace.
