= XHMICH-FM =

Radio station in Morelia, Michoacán, Mexico

- Morelia, Michoacán, Mexico; Mexico
- Frequency: 103.3 FM
- Branding: Vox

Programming
- Format: Noncommercial news/talk

Ownership
- Owner: La Voz del Viento, A.C.

History
- First air date: August 14, 2013 (permit)
- Call sign meaning: MICHoacán

Technical information
- ERP: 3 kW
- HAAT: 2.34 m (7.7 ft)
- Transmitter coordinates: 19°40′28″N 101°11′29″W

Links
- Webcast: Listen live
- Website: grupovox.mx

XHMICH-FM is a noncommercial radio station in Morelia, Michoacán, Mexico, broadcasting on 103.3 FM. XHMICH is owned by La Voz del Viento, A.C. and broadcasts a news/talk format known as Vox.

== History ==
XHMICH received its permit on August 14, 2013. The station had been requested in May 2011.

Vox 103.3 is related to the Respuesta newspaper in the state. It produces radio-TV programming with the newspaper, and its owner represented the permitholder when signing for the concession.
