= KLMP =

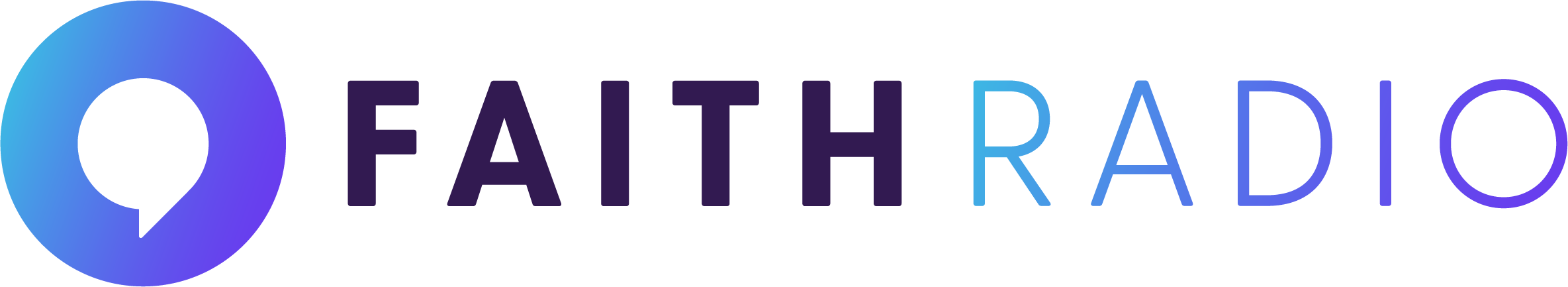
- Rapid City, South Dakota; United States
- Frequency: 88.3 MHz

Programming
- Format: Christian Talk
- Network: Faith Radio

Ownership
- Owner: Northwestern Media; (University of Northwestern – St. Paul)
- Sister stations: KSLT, KSLP, KSLS, KLBF

History
- First air date: February 2005
- Former call signs: KLGH (1997–2005); KTPT (2005–2007)
- Call sign meaning: "Lamp"; station was known as "The Light"

Technical information
- Licensing authority: FCC
- Facility ID: 88452
- Class: C
- ERP: 63,000 watts
- HAAT: 522 meters
- Transmitter coordinates: 44°19′42″N 103°50′3″W
- Repeater: 88.3 KLMP-FM1 (Rapid City)

Links
- Public license information: Public file; LMS
- Website: myfaithradio.com

KLMP (88.3 FM) is a radio station in Rapid City, South Dakota, United States. It is owned by Northwestern Media, the radio ministry of University of Northwestern – St. Paul, and broadcasts its national Faith Radio service with Christian talk and teaching programming.

88.3 in Rapid City began broadcasting in February 2005 as KTPT "The Point". The Christian contemporary hit radio outlet switched to 97.9 MHz in 2007, moving KLMP "The Light"—a Christian talk and teaching station with history dating to 1968—to 88.3 MHz. Bethesda Christian Broadcasting began its exit from broadcasting in 2021 by selling KLMP and KSLT to Northwestern Media.

== History ==
In February 2005, 88.3 MHz in Rapid City was activated as KTPT "The Point". It was owned by Bethesda Christian Broadcasting and aired a Christian contemporary hit radio format On April 28, 2007, Bethesda switched KTPT to 97.9 MHz, moving Christian talk and teaching station KLMP "The Light" to the 88.3 frequency.

Bethesda began to exit broadcasting in 2021 when it announced the sale of KLMP and KSLT in Spearfish, as well as two high-power repeaters of KSLT, two boosters, and a translator, to Northwestern Media for $249,000. The purchase closed on January 31, 2022.
