= Larry Steckline =

American broadcaster

Larry Steckline is a prominent Kansas broadcasting entrepreneur, and radio and television personality, particularly known for his Kansas agriculture news/feature/commentary programs. His company, Steckline Communications—formerly known as the Mid-Kansas Ag Network—provides various media services, including agricultural news syndicated to radio and television stations throughout Kansas. Steckline has also owned and operated 27 Kansas and Oklahoma radio stations.

Since 1964, Steckline has produced agricultural news, information and commentary programs aired on television and radio stations throughout Kansas and into adjoining Nebraska, Colorado, and Oklahoma, particularly on KTVH-TV (Wichita, Kansas/Hutchinson, Kansas, and later the Kansas State Network (KSN), the state's main provider of television broadcast to rural communities, as well as three of Kansas' five largest cities (Wichita, Topeka, and Salina). He returned to KWCH-TV (KTVH-TV's successor), and continued broadcasts of his Ag News Network. Most recently, his program has appeared on Wichita's KAKE-TV.

== Early life ==
Larry E. Steckline was born on August 24, 1941, in Hays, Kansas, and raised in Ellis, Kansas, until nine years old. His parents were Carl Steckline, who was raised at Hyacinth, Kansas, and Irene Schoendaller Steckline, of Liebenthal, Kansas. Both were of Volga-German ancestry.

The family then moved to a 200-acre leased farm near Ogallah, Kansas, which, though it had electricity, had no running water. Steckline attended high school in WaKeeney, Kansas, and graduated in 1959. Though Steckline's father wanted him to remain on the farm, his mother wanted him to go to college. He attended Wichita Business College, in the state's distant largest city, Wichita, and studied to become a bookkeeper.

While attending school, Steckline was a bookkeeper for Wichita's livestock yards—a job that continued for 15 years, until he was hired as public relations director for Wichita's entire livestock market industry—one of the nation's largest.

== Broadcast career ==
Steckline's agri-business programs, eventually aired over his Mid-America Ag Network, would ultimately reach 40 affiliate radio stations, and be carried on Kansas's largest television stations — his programs reaching into four states. By invitation, he interviewed three U.S. Presidents on agriculture issues at the White House.

Over the course of his career, Steckline, or his companies, owned 27 radio stations, mostly in Kansas. To promote his stations, Steckline hosted country music concerts by Roy Clark, Tanya Tucker, Charlie Pride, Reba McEntire, T.G. Shepherd, Ronnie Milsap, The Oakridge Boys, the Bellamy Brothers, and others.

=== 1960s-1990s ===
In the mid-1960s, a few months after ascending to the public relations executive job, Steckline began broadcasting the uncompensated agriculture ("ag") report on Wichita's television channel 12 KTVH-TV, suddenly filling in for a reporter who had quit, soon becoming the station's "farm director." Steckline continued the airing the report over the next 45 years.

Starting in 1968, Steckline worked with KFRM (AM) (Clay Center, Kansas) for several years, broadcasting agricultural news.

In 1974, Steckline built KJLS (FM) in Hays, Kansas, a country-western station that, according to Steckline, was the first FM radio station to survive west of U.S. Highway 81 (the north–south highway bisecting the nation). It would be the first of many radio stations he would acquire, several with call letters that included his initials: "LS".

By 1977, Steckline—still broadcasting—was also operating his own farm. In 1977, following an abrupt dismissal from KFRM, he created the "Mid America Ag Network" (Wichita, Kansas), syndicating his ag shows state-wide, and beyond.

By 1988, Steckline owned six radio stations in Kansas, and one in Oklahoma, jointly labeled as the "LS Network"—including KSLS (FM) and KYUU (AM), both in Liberal, Kansas; KXXX (AM) and KQLS (FM) in Colby, Kansas; and KXLS (FM) in Enid, Oklahoma. The network's flagship station, at the time, was KGLS (FM), near the center of the state in Hutchinson and Pratt—a "modern" country music station, whose 1,000-foot tower was estimated to boost the station's reach to 75 miles—the strongest signal of any commercial radio station in centrally located Hutchinson, Kansas. (Steckline estimated it had 125,000 potential listeners—not counting Sedgwick County, Kansas, also in range, home to the state's largest city, Wichita—population 300,000 at the time.)

=== Since 2000 ===
In 2001, Steckline's Mid-America Ag Network—at that time with 40 affiliate radio stations—acquired radio broadcast rights to the games of Kansas State Athletics (of Kansas State University). The five-year contract, beginning in July 2002, cost $6 million—nearly quadrupling the rights fee paid to K-State by the previous contractor.

In 2004, Steckline was broadcasting a weekly evening agribusiness segment on KWCH-TV (Wichita/Hutchinson; the former KTVH-TV where his broadcast career began), while also operating his Ag News Network.

In 2007, the "Rocking M" radio group—reportedly comprising more broadcast properties than anyone else in Kansas—was assembled from 17 former Steckline stations: one AM and three FMs in Dodge City; one AM and two FMs in Great Bend (two licensed to Larned); one AM and two FMs in Goodland; two FMs in Salina, one AM and one FM in Colby; one AM and one FM in Liberal; and one AM in Pratt.

In 2010, after 30 years broadcasting his daily "ag report" on the Kansas State Network ("KSN") and its forerunner (KARD-TV), Steckline's contract was abruptly terminated in a one-sentence notice from KSN's general manager, with no explanation or comment

In 2011, Steckline began appearing in an online news format, Steckline Ag Report, with ag news in 3-5 minute segments, produced for the website of the Farm Credit cooperative American AgCredit By 2015, he owned only one remaining radio station, KWLS (FM) (Winfield, Kansas), on which he continued to broadcast his agri-business program daily. The syndicated program was also airing on 40 radio stations across Kansas and Nebraska.

In 2020, Steckline resumed his ag program on KSN's and KWCH's Wichita rival, KAKE-TV.

In 2025, at age 84, after 64 years on-air, Steckline's personal on-air ag reports ended at KAKE-TV, but he continued farming.

== Other business and personal affairs ==
With his first wife, Wah-leeta, by 1977 Steckline had three children.

Over the following years, as his show grew in popularity, Steckline and his wife took Kansas farmers on tours to China, Russia, Australia, and South America. He made several trade-mission trips to Russia. He traveled internationally with U.S. Agriculture Secretaries John Block, Ed Madigan, Clayton Yeutter and Dan Glickman.

Wah-leeta, at age 59, died September 30, 2000, in a farming accident, just a few months before their 40th wedding anniversary.

By 2001, while still the owner and president of his Mid America Ag Network, Steckline, with his son Greg, were operating their 2,500-acre farm and ranch, "The Ponderosa," outside Garden Plain, Kansas, near Wichita.

In early 2002, Steckline interviewed Kansas Attorney General Carla Stovall, then a Republican candidate for Governor, who had served as president of the National Association of Attorneys General. A romance ensued. Despite being regarded as a front-runner, and confident she would win, Stovall abandoned her 2002 gubernatorial run in April, before the primary election, saying she no longer desired the job, and promptly announced plans to marry Steckline (whom she married August 31, 2002, at St. Elizabeth's Catholic Church in Grove, Oklahoma)—withdrawing from politics, and throwing the Kansas Republican Party into chaos; Democrat Kathleen Sebelius won the subsequent general election.

Wife Carla became legal "counsel to a lot of Larry's companies." In 2015, she published a biography of Steckline — Larry Steckline: A Half-century as the Voice of Kansas Agriculture — and the couple committed the proceeds to local chapters of the National Association of FFA (Future Farmers of America), an agricultural-education program for young people (Steckline had been an FFA member as a youth).

The couple acquired and renovated a 30-year-old sightseeing cruise ship, the Cherokee Queen, and began offering scenic cruises of the Grand Lake Waterways area, starting in 2019.

In 2004, Steckline had three adult children and nine grandchildren. Son Greg was "in the business," daughter Anita Cochran was a TV news anchor for the Kansas State Network, and daughter Shasta was a school librarian.

In 2025, at age 84, Steckline was still farming.

== Other roles ==
- Manager, Wichita Livestock Market Foundation, 1965
- Director, Kansas National Junior Livestock show, 1973
- Board Member, Kansas State Fair, appointed 2003
- Fundraiser, Newman University, 1997, 2009
- Trustee, Kansas FFA Foundation, (Future Farmers of America affiliate), appointed 2016

== Recognition and awards ==
- 1980 Communications Service Award, Kansas Agribusiness Retailers Association
- 2000 Award of "recognition for years of service, accomplishments, and contributions to the farming industry" from the U.S. Department of Agriculture’s Grain Inspection, Packers and Stockyards Administration (GIPSA)
- 2003 NFU Milton Hakel Award for Agricultural Communications, National Farmers Union
- 2009 "Oscar in Agriculture" award for career contributions: University of Illinois at Urbana-Champaign.
