= KERP =

- Ingalls, Kansas; United States
- Broadcast area: Southwest Kansas
- Frequency: 96.3 MHz
- Branding: 96.3 The Marshal

Programming
- Format: Country
- Affiliations: Salem Radio Networks, Local Radio Networks

Ownership
- Owner: Kansas Broadcast Company, LLC
- Sister stations: KAHE, KGNO, KZRD, KSMM

Technical information
- Licensing authority: FCC
- Facility ID: 82681
- Class: C1
- ERP: 100,000 watts
- HAAT: 213.0 meters (698.8 ft)
- Transmitter coordinates: 37°56′30″N 100°18′44″W

Links
- Public license information: Public file; LMS
- Webcast: KERP Webstream
- Website: KERP Online

KERP (96.3 FM, "96.3 The Marshal") is a radio station broadcasting a country music format. Licensed to Ingalls, Kansas, United States, the station serves the Southwest Kansas area. The station is currently owned by Kansas Broadcast Company, LLC.
