= KEXP =

Public radio station in Seattle

KEXP-FM
- Seattle, Washington; United States
- Broadcast area: Seattle metropolitan area
- Frequency: 90.3 MHz (HD Radio)
- Branding: KEXP

Programming
- Format: Eclectic, indie music
- Affiliations: NPR (music licensing)

Ownership
- Owner: Friends of KEXP

History
- First air date: May 10, 1972
- Former call signs: KCMU (1972–2001)
- Former frequencies: 90.5 MHz (1972–1987)
- Call sign meaning: Experience Music Project, the original name of the Museum of Pop Culture

Technical information
- Licensing authority: FCC
- Facility ID: 68668
- Class: C3
- ERP: 4,700 watts
- HAAT: 211 meters (692 ft)
- Transmitter coordinates: 47°36′57.4″N 122°18′32.5″W
- Repeater: 92.7 KEXC (Alameda, California)

Links
- Public license information: Public file; LMS
- Webcast: Listen live
- Website: kexp.org

KEXP (90.3 FM) is a non-commercial radio station in Seattle, Washington, United States, specializing in indie music programmed by its disc jockeys. KEXP's studios are located at the Seattle Center. The transmitter is located in Seattle's Capitol Hill neighborhood. The station is operated by the non-profit entity Friends of KEXP, an affiliate of the University of Washington. Since March 19, 2024, KEXP-FM's programming has been rebroadcast over Alameda, California–licensed KEXC, which serves the San Francisco Bay Area.

As well as daily variety mix shows featuring mostly alternative rock music, KEXP hosts weekly programs dedicated to other musical genres, such as hip-hop, Afrobeat, punk, ambient, alternative country, Latin music, and world music. The station also regularly hosts live, in-studio performances by artists. Alongside its analog transmitters serving Seattle and San Francisco, the station offers an online live stream, a real-time playlist with DJ notes, and an actively maintained YouTube channel.

Founded in 1972 as KCMU, the student-run station of the University of Washington, KEXP gained recognition for its influence on the regional music scene. It was the first station to air grunge bands like Nirvana and Soundgarden in the late 1980s. After partnering with the Experience Music Project, now the Museum of Pop Culture, in 2001, the station began to acquire an international listener base thanks to an early investment in internet streaming and its website. In 2014, the university transferred the FCC license of KEXP-FM to Friends of KEXP in exchange for on-air underwriting spots, granting the station independence in management and programming decisions.

== History ==
=== Early years as KCMU (1971–1985) ===
The University of Washington (UW)'s involvement in radio broadcasting dates to the 1952 launch of KUOW-FM, which moved to 94.9 MHz in 1958. The station served as an environment for training communications students and provided classical music, fine arts, and sports programming. In the early 1970s, university budget cuts led to an increased professionalization of that station and decreased student involvement. The need for more student involvement had become apparent after a 1970 student strike at the UW, during which time airtime on KUOW was "taken over" and temporarily given to a student group known as the Student Communication Coalition and branding itself "Radio Free Seattle". As a result, four UW undergraduates—John Kean, Cliff Noonan, Victoria ("Tory") Fiedler, and Brent Wilcox—began planning to create a second UW station to be run by students. Noonan felt that there was insufficient student media in a time marked by student activism and protests; there was only a campus newspaper, The Daily, and Noonan had come from San Francisco, where he was aware of other college stations. The four students formulated a proposal and were able to secure the backing of the UW Board of Regents, which promised funding if the students could get a station approved by the Federal Communications Commission (FCC). On July 13, 1971, UW filed an application for a new 10-watt non-commercial educational station on 90.5 MHz, which would be located in the Communications Building (abbreviated "CMU" on campus maps).

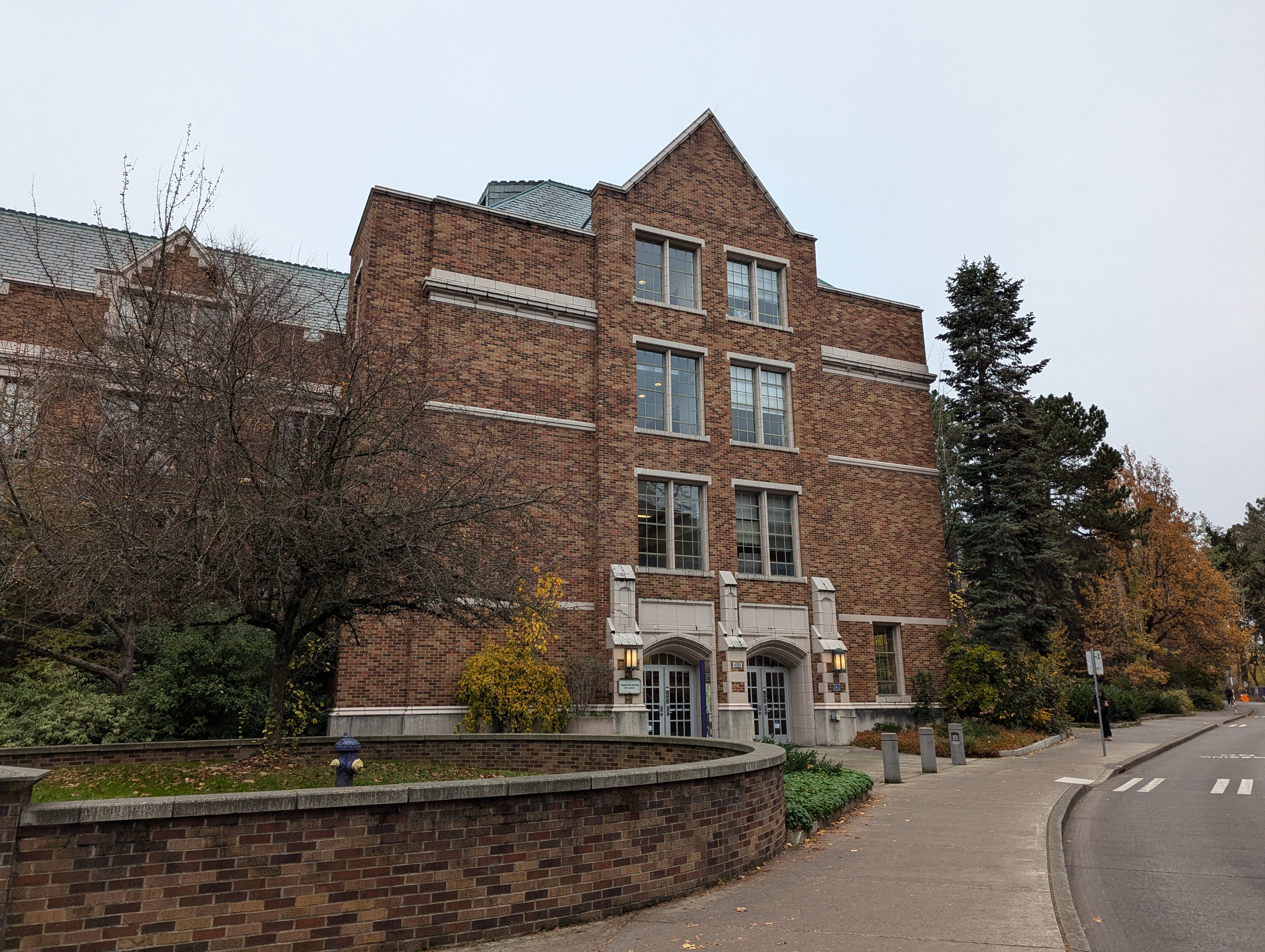
The Communications Building, KCMU's namesake and first studio location

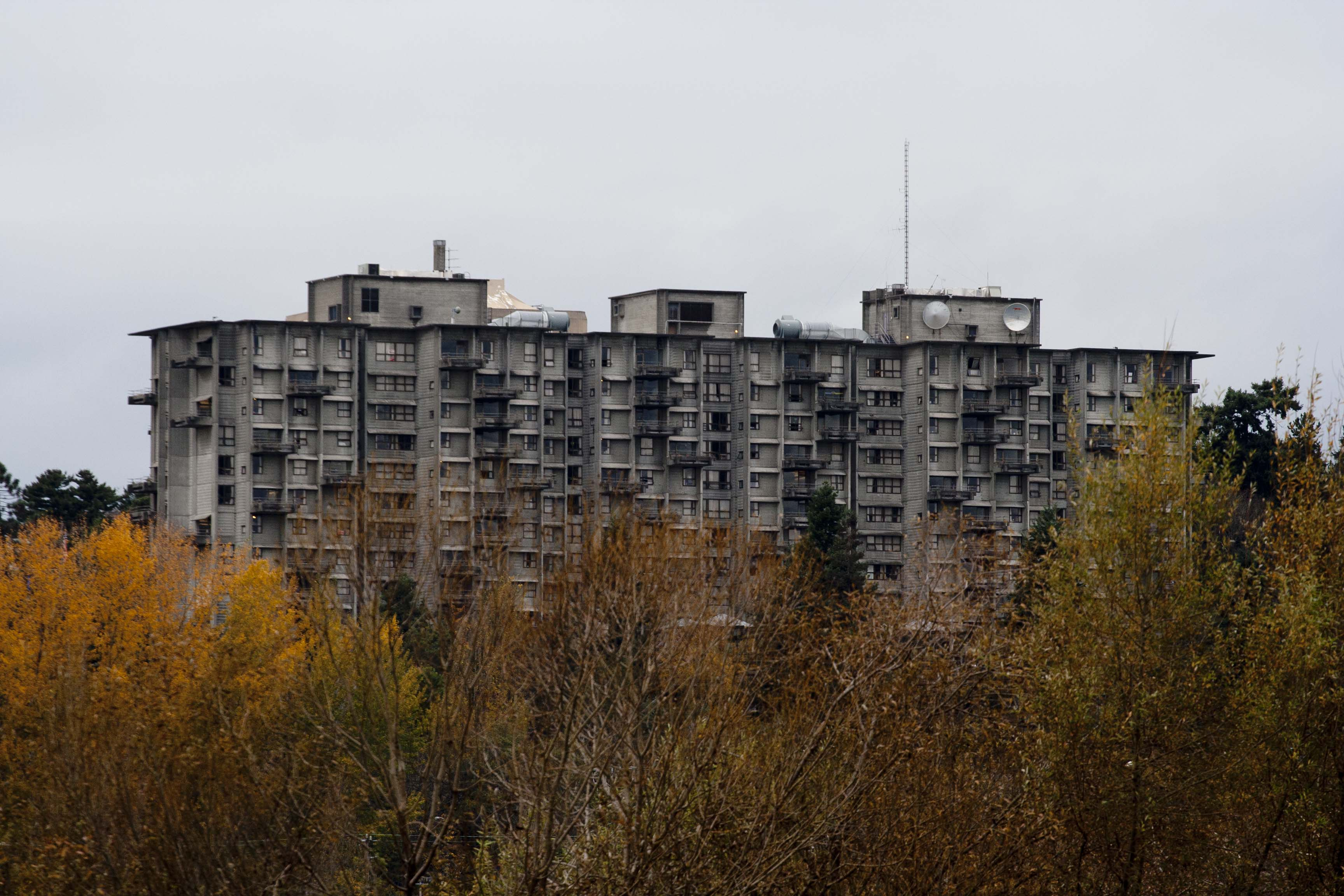
McMahon Hall, KCMU's first transmitter site

On October 5, the FCC granted the permit, and the UW Board of Regents approved the concept for the station (originally dubbed KPMG, for "Professional Media Group") the next month. It then fell to the students to put together the equipment and resources necessary to get KCMU going, including old turntables from a northwest Washington radio station and an old transmitter being discarded by KNHC at Nathan Hale High School as it was upgrading its own facilities; the students also received a $2,500 grant from the Board of Regents. Construction tasks included retrofitting a third-floor room in the building, erecting a transmitter tower atop McMahon Hall, and manually upgrading a telephone line to send audio from the Communications Building to the facility. KCMU began broadcasting on May 10, 1972. The station split its airtime between information and "folk-rock and blues" music. That summer, it sent reporters to both the Democratic and Republican national political conventions. The station also produced alternative student-led coverage of UW athletic events, including women's basketball, which was not being aired at the time by the commercial rightsholder for university sports, KIRO. The limited-power station served few listeners; a 2007 column recounting the station's early history noted that it "barely reached the Ave", the commercial heart of Seattle's University District, and UW administrators ordered a programming overhaul in 1975 to increase the audience. During the 1970s, the station produced several people who went on to managerial and on-air positions in Seattle broadcasting, among them Steve Pool.

In 1980, the university filed to increase KCMU's power from 10 watts to 182 in the wake of changes to FCC regulations encouraging many 10-watt stations to increase power. The $5,000 upgrade, carried out in June 1982, also marked the beginning of stereo broadcasts. During this time, the station began programming new wave music on weekdays from 3 p.m. to midnight; the station adopted new wave as its full-time musical format in July 1981 after KZAM (1540 AM), a commercial outlet broadcasting the same music, dropped it due to low ratings.

The shift in music and impending technical overhaul came as further university budget cuts meant the end of financial support from the UW's School of Communications; a one-time grant from the university student activities and fees committee kept the station on the air during the 1981–1982 school year and gave its backers time to hold fundraising events, the first in its history. This marked a permanent shift to being listener-supported, though KUOW provided engineering and accounting services. As part of its operating agreement, the station aired five-minute hourly newscasts prepared by the university's journalism students. In 1982, KCMU once again gained commercial competition in the form of KJET (1590 AM), which adopted the new wave format.

=== Championing the "Seattle sound" (1985–1992) ===
KCMU was at the center of a new music scene in the mid-1980s that would eventually emerge as grunge. In the words of early 1980s music director Faith Henschel, the station had long been "very sympathetic to local bands" and already had a requirement that a local band must be played at least once every hour. In late 1985, Chris Knab, who co-founded 415 Records and was a former owner of Aquarius Records in San Francisco, sold his interest in 415 Records and became KCMU's station manager. The next year, Rolling Stone featured KCMU and other college stations in an article hailing them as growing "taste makers". Jonathan Poneman—who hosted a music show known as Audioasis—and Bruce Pavitt met at KCMU, leading to the foundation of record label Sub Pop. In a 2011 retrospective on grunge in Billboard, Poneman noted that his "big break" was being a DJ at KCMU. The role of KCMU—and format competitor KJET—in popularizing bands was further enhanced because of Seattle's liquor regulation regime, which stunted the live events business. KCMU increased its power in 1987 when it moved frequencies from 90.5 to 90.3 MHz and relocated its transmitter to a tower site in the Capitol Hill neighborhood, using 400 watts.

There's no doubt KCMU was directly responsible for the cultural flowering in Seattle recently.

— Mia Boyle, former KCMU fine arts editor and station board member in 1992

At this time, a series of influential figures with ties to bands were passing through the UW. Mark Arm lived in Terry Hall for a time, going on to front Green River and Mudhoney. Kim Thayil had moved to Seattle to follow Pavitt; he won a prize on KCMU, was invited to be a full-time DJ, and not only graduated from the UW with a degree in philosophy but got his band Soundgarden exposure on KCMU, the first station to play them. Music director Henschel created a two-cassette compilation of songs by local groups, titled "Bands That Will Make You Money", and sent it to record labels; that led to Soundgarden getting signed to A&M Records. Charles R. Cross, editor of music magazine The Rocket, noted, "It's no exaggeration to say that virtually every volunteer who had an air shift in the late '80s ended up getting a job in the music industry or playing some role in the Seattle scene." Soundgarden was not the only group that KCMU was breaking on the radio: in 1988, Kurt Cobain, looking for airplay for his band Nirvana, knocked on KCMU's door and handed the station a copy of his first single, "Love Buzz"; they did not play it until Cobain called from a gas station pay phone to request it. That same year, KCMU again became the only alternative music station (Note: The format label had changed from "new wave" or "new music" to "alternative" over the course of the 1980s.) in the Seattle market when KJET dropped the format.

While KCMU was becoming renowned in the grunge scene, its musical offerings were more varied. Under Henschel, the format was broadened to take in blues and African music, among other genres. The Sunday night Rap Attack was the first radio program in Seattle to play such artists as Ice-T, Eazy-E, and N.W.A. By the late 1990s, the program had changed names to Street Sounds, with hosts including DJ Nasty-Nes and Marcus "Kutfather" Tufono; it remains on KEXP's schedule as of 2022.

By 1992, ten years after becoming listener-supported, KCMU's budget had grown from $20,000 to $180,000. (Note: In 2025 dollars, adjusting for inflation separately: $54,843 to $360,230) As well as the two technical improvements in the 1980s, it had added more paid staffers and listeners.

=== Strife and change in the '90s (1992–2001) ===
In November 1992, seeking to professionalize the station's sound, KCMU management made the decision to dismiss nine volunteer disc jockeys to add two syndicated radio programs to the lineup: World Cafe from WXPN in Philadelphia and Monitoradio, produced by The Christian Science Monitor. The decision caused an outcry and led KCMU supporters to organize as Censorship Undermines Radio Station Ethics, abbreviated CURSE. Protests centered around the changes and their near-unilateral implementation. Management further inflamed tensions after firing one volunteer reporter, Dick Burton, who discussed the controversy in a newscast; station manager Knab stated that Burton had violated a station policy barring on-air criticism of KCMU and then suspended the station's volunteer news staff. In response, the news staff presented their resignations; one DJ, Riz Rollins, resigned; and CURSE encouraged listeners to withhold donations. It circulated flyers reading "KCMU Is Dying", with Poneman arguing that Knab and other paid staff wanted to turn KCMU into a "baby NPR, middle-of-the-road, vaguely alternative, soft-rock radio station". Several labels, including Sub Pop, Capitol Records, and C/Z Records, withheld record service to the station. The dispute reached the front page of Billboard, which called KCMU "one of the most influential commercial-free stations in the country". Knab later defended his decisions as stemming from a desire by university leadership to grow the station.

The fight between KCMU management and CURSE, which led to KCMU discontinuing broadcasting between 1 and 6 a.m., made its way to the United States District Court for the Western District of Washington in January 1993. Three listeners and 11 staffers who claimed they were fired without warning argued in federal court that their First Amendment rights to free speech were being violated by KCMU, owned by the University of Washington, a state agency; they sued Knab and university director of broadcast services Wayne Roth. By the time of the lawsuit, 22 volunteers had left the station within two months.

In August 1994, federal judge Thomas Samuel Zilly ruled in favor of the KCMU staffers in Aldrich v. Knab, finding the no-criticism policy set out by Knab was unconstitutional, ordering six of the 11 staffers reinstated; none of the staffers reclaimed their positions. By this time, tensions had cooled; World Café was moved to weekends, and UW gave KCMU $20,000 to help it get financially back on track. These moves reduced the impact of CURSE's decisions and helped bring back listeners and some record labels, resulting in a new KCMU that, per a profile in Rolling Stone, was sounding "more like the old KCMU". In a 2020 journal article, Christopher Cwynar noted that the early 1990s CURSE episode and change in focus mirrored the rise of the adult album alternative format in public radio as well as the demands toward professionalization that similar stations—including WXPN and KCRW in Santa Monica, California—experienced.

In 1996, KCMU management opted to eliminate KCMU's 6 p.m. news and information hour, which it argued overlapped with KUOW-FM. It also noted that KBCS (91.3 FM) aired some of the same Pacifica Radio output that was on KCMU. That year, the station also hired its first three full-time paid DJs, marking the first time since sporadic attempts between 1989 and 1992 that air staff were paid. The last volunteer DJs were fired in 1997. Two of the DJs that would come to define KEXP in the 2000s and 2010s were already in place in the last decade as KCMU. John Richards joined the station in the mid-1990s and got DJ shifts simply by showing up when others were not in the building. Cheryl Waters came aboard in 1994, hosting weekly live sessions recorded at the Jack Straw Cultural Center.

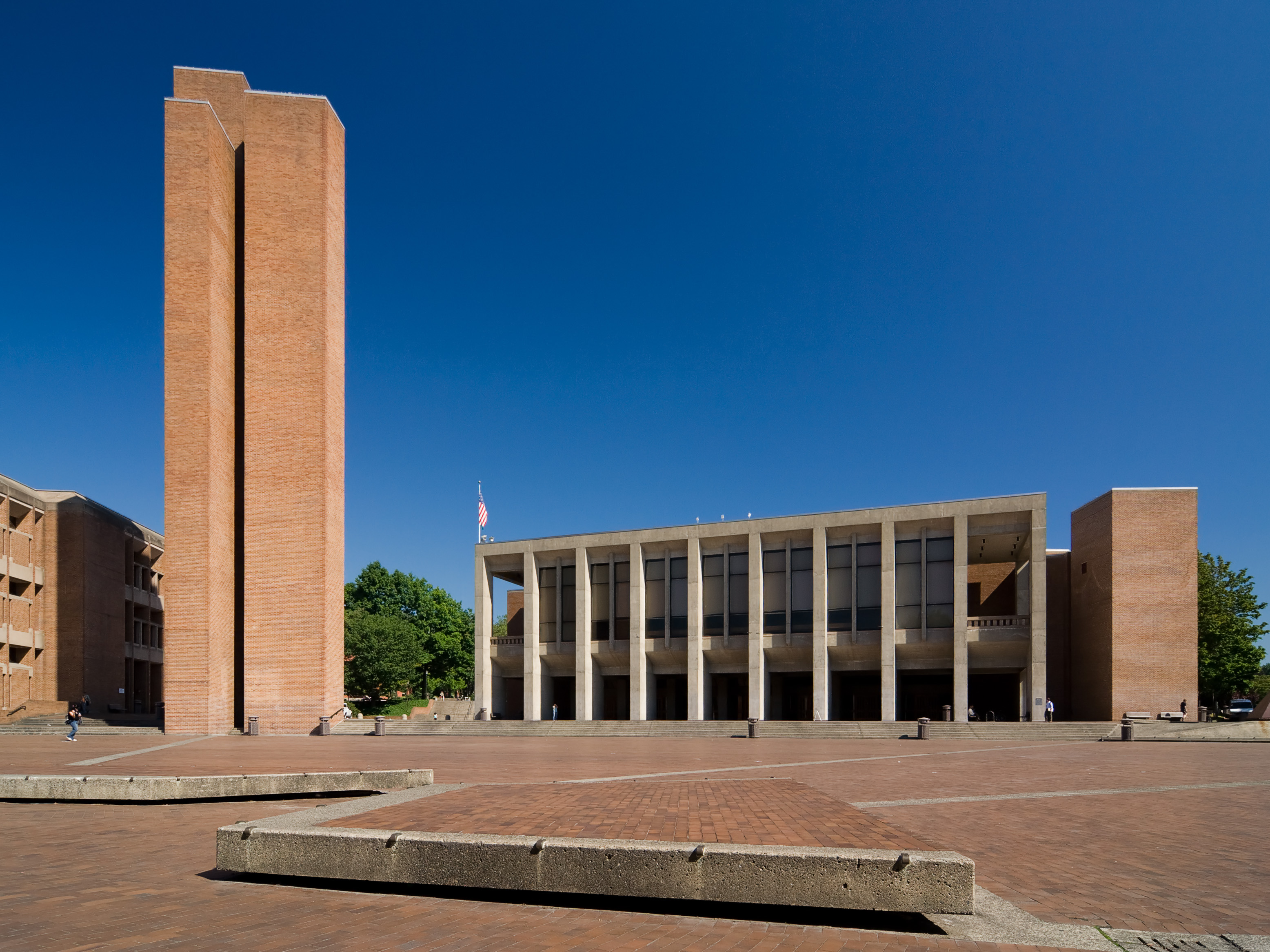
Kane Hall

By the late 1990s, rumors of change and actual changes were swirling around KCMU. Reports suggested a possible combination of KUOW and KCMU with KPLU, a jazz station in Tacoma, was in the works, leaving open the possibility of a format change. The UW was preparing to move KCMU out of its namesake—the Communications Building—and into new studios to be shared with KUOW in the Ave. Arcade building at 45th Street and University Way as part of a plan to maximize classroom availability in campus buildings. In 1999, the university announced it would separate KCMU management from KUOW-FM and place it in the Office for Computing and Communications (C&C), which operated the campus's internet infrastructure, as a test bed for streaming and emerging technologies. Further, consistent rumblings were emerging of a potential partnership between the station and the Experience Music Project (EMP), then set to open the next year. The Experience Music Project—now known as the Museum of Pop Culture—was financed by Microsoft founder Paul Allen, with whom the UW was in discussions about other philanthropic donations, and Jon Kertzer, a former KCMU station manager, was involved with Allen's investment company, Vulcan Inc., on the EMP. In 2016, music director Don Yates would call the move under C&C "the best thing that ever happened to the station" because it resulted in major technological advancements.

In 2000, KCMU moved to Kane Hall on the UW campus. That year, it also started streaming high-quality, 128-kilobit-per-second MP3 compressed audio over the internet, becoming the first station in the world to offer online audio of this quality.

=== Expansion as KEXP and Experience Music Project affiliation (2001–2011) ===
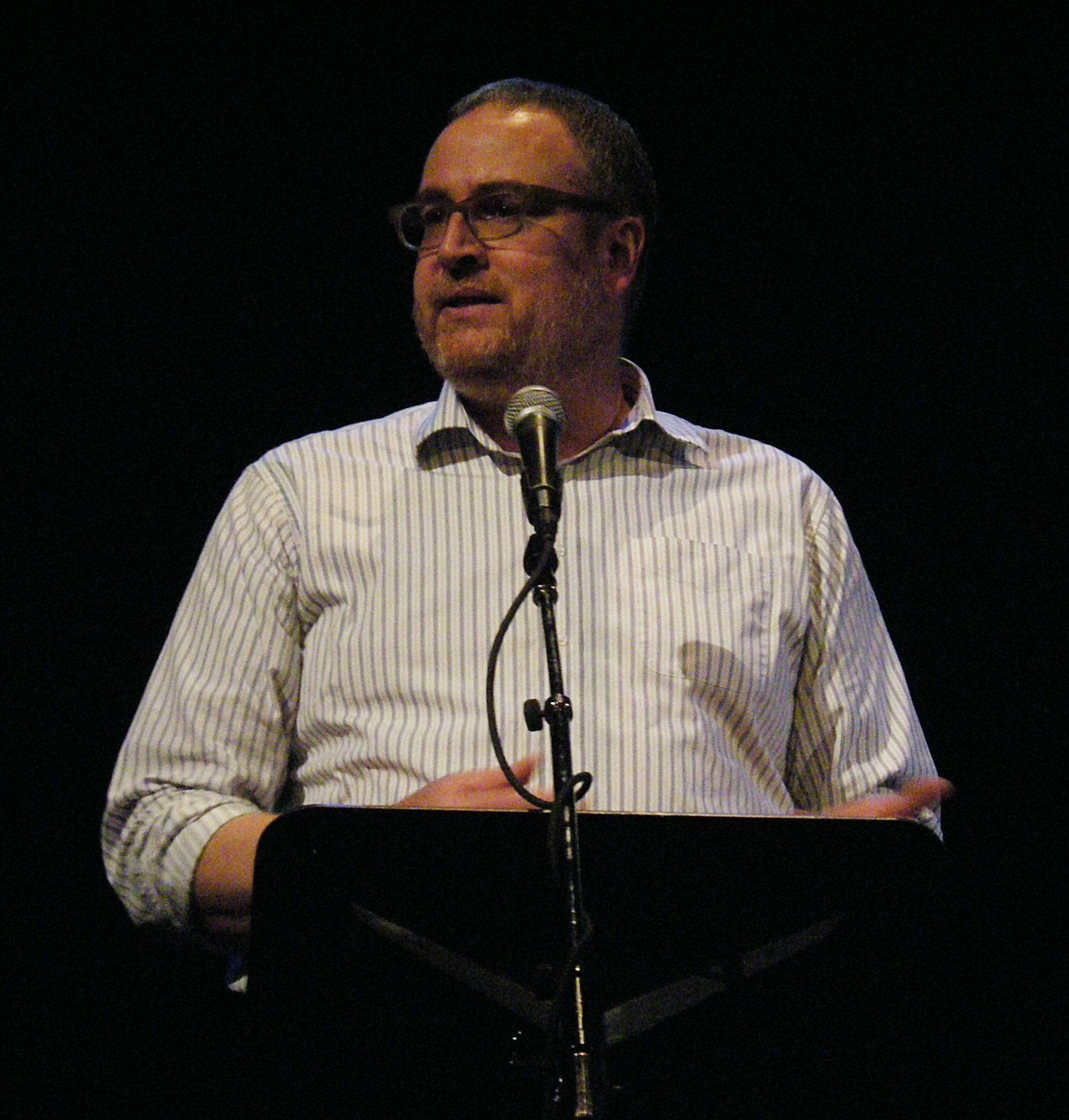
Executive director Tom Mara led KCMU and KEXP for more than 30 years.

On March 29, 2001, the UW unveiled a partnership with the EMP to transform KCMU in every way except its format. The license would still belong to the university, but the station would relocate to fully upgraded studios in the former home of KZOK at 113 Dexter Avenue North and change its call sign to KEXP-FM, increasing its power to 720 watts. The partnership combined the university, the radio station, the EMP, and the Allen Foundation for Music, which provided up to $600,000 over four years to UW. It also generated some concern over whether the station would lose its edge with the involvement of Allen, who owned two commercial stations in Portland, and whether the station needed listener support if it now had Allen's backing. The EMP partnership also marked the end of any UW student involvement with the station; Associated Students of the University of Washington started a new online-only campus station, Rainy Dawg Radio, in 2003. Cwynar noted that the change in call sign represented the station's shift "from campus-based community broadcaster to community-funded music experience provider". The KCMU call sign later recurred on KCMU-LP, a low-power station in Napa, California, whose founder worked at KCMU in Seattle while a student at the UW.

Our main motivation in transitioning old-media-based KCMU into broadband-Internet-based KEXP was to try to use Internet technologies to springboard DJs and listeners into a wider global audience. We hoped that by using the Internet to tie together those otherwise niche communities across the globe that we could make KEXP a viable force supporting truly authentic music.

— Ron Johnson, former head of the Office for Computing and Communications at the UW

Over the next several years, KEXP grew considerably and brought in much more money. In 2002, the EMP financed 52 percent of KEXP's budget; it was self-reliant by 2006, when it brought in $3.3 million in revenue. In 2001, UW engineers invented CD players that could retrieve song metadata from the internet to build a real-time playlist. The next year, the station started offering a rolling archive of its last two weeks of programming, later adding an archive of past in-studio performances. The station's streaming audience was growing and becoming more geographically diverse. From 2004 to 2005, weekly online listenership jumped from 26,000 to 50,000. A map in KEXP's studios, filled with yellow pins for listeners around the world, sprouted pins in places as far from Seattle as Tokyo, London, Mongolia, and Antarctica.

Since 2001, KEXP has been affiliated with NPR, although the station only plays music and does not carry any NPR news programming. The station's NPR affiliation coincided with the 2001 creation of the Copyright Arbitration Royalty Panel (CARP), which would eventually issue a new rule mandating smaller internet broadcasters to pay $0.14 in royalty fees per listener per song. Due to its new NPR affiliation, KEXP was exempt from the higher fees imposed by the CARP ruling.

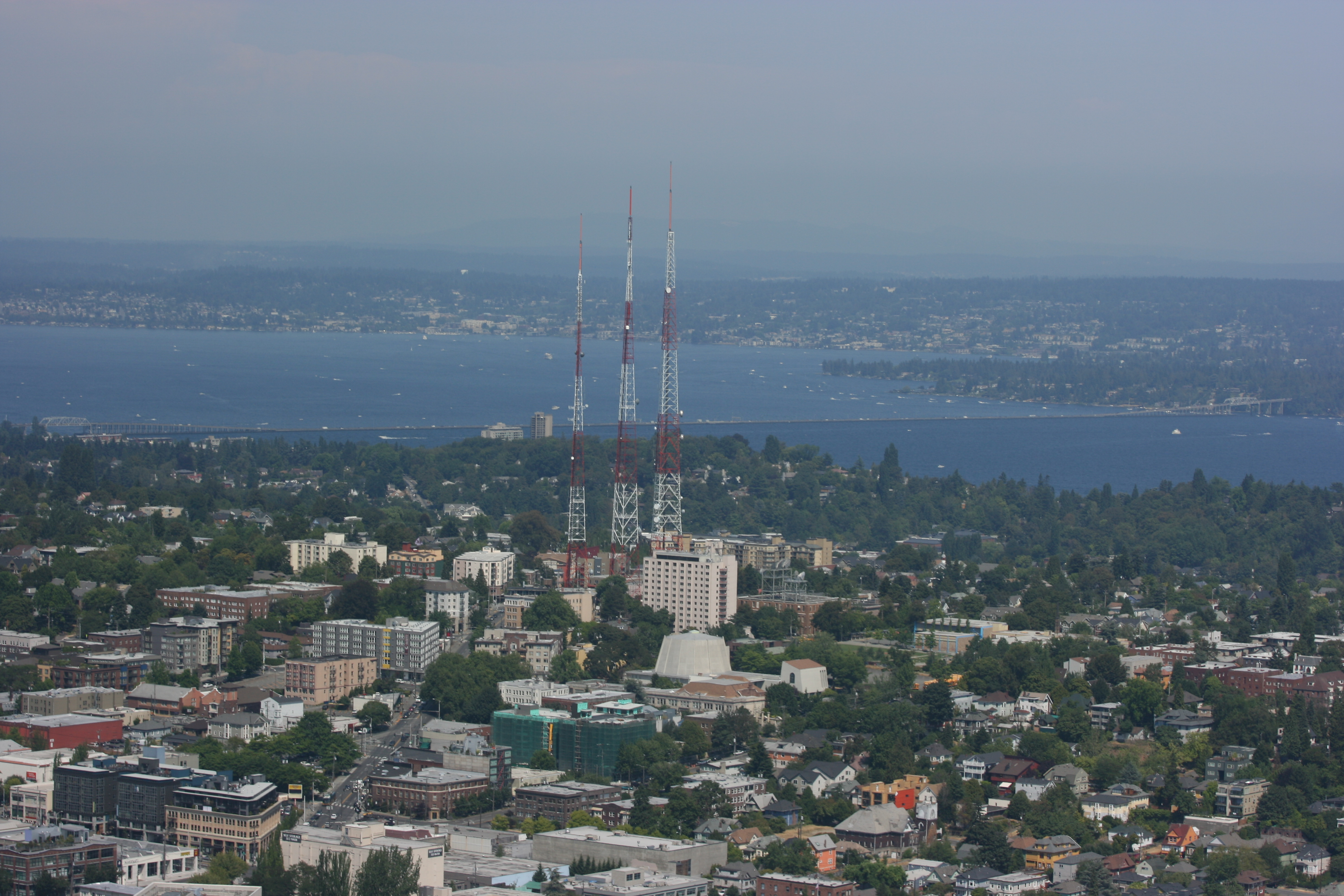
KEXP-FM is broadcast from a transmitter site on East Madison Street, in Seattle's Capitol Hill neighborhood.

KEXP also added a terrestrial signal in Western Washington for a time. In 2004, KBTC, the radio station at Bates Technical College in Tacoma, was sold to Public Radio Capital for $5 million; the EMP then leased it under the call letters KXOT to expand KEXP's signal. This agreement proved a strain on KEXP's finances to the point where there was a possibility in late 2004 that the station would not make payroll; a 2005 article in Seattle Weekly revealed that several staffers had counseled Mara against entering into the pact. The Tacoma simulcast agreement was wound down in March 2006 because the EMP was ceasing to underwrite KEXP's losses; that same year, KEXP increased its effective radiated power to its present 4,700 watts.

==== Joint venture with WNYE New York ====
New York City was one of the largest markets for KEXP streaming, and an opportunity arose for the station to expand there. In August 2007, WNYE (91.5 FM) "Radio New York", part of the NYC Media division of the New York City government, approached KEXP to begin a joint venture. Management was planning to overhaul the station's programming, and the deal also would help WNYE—long a station with a modest budget—gain an identity. KEXP output would be simulcast for 39 hours a week, including from 6 a.m. to noon each weekday, under the banner of "Radio Liberation".

On March 24, 2008, KEXP DJ John Richards's morning show, John in the Morning, was heard on both KEXP and WNYE for the first time. The other three programs produced for Radio Liberation—Wake Up, Music That Matters, and Mo'Glo—were custom for New York and did not air on KEXP. The plan was for KEXP to broadcast live from New York several times a year; Richards began splitting his time between live broadcasts in both New York and Seattle in June 2008.

The venture was never truly successful, largely because some of the intended audience was already streaming KEXP; the Great Recession, which began months after the alliance started, reduced marketing budgets and led to the layoffs of KEXP's New York-oriented operations staffers. The relationship ended on June 1, 2011: WNYE replaced KEXP programming with a morning simulcast of Fordham University-owned 90.7 WFUV in New York, airing adult album alternative (AAA) music.

=== Move to the Seattle Center (2011–2020) ===
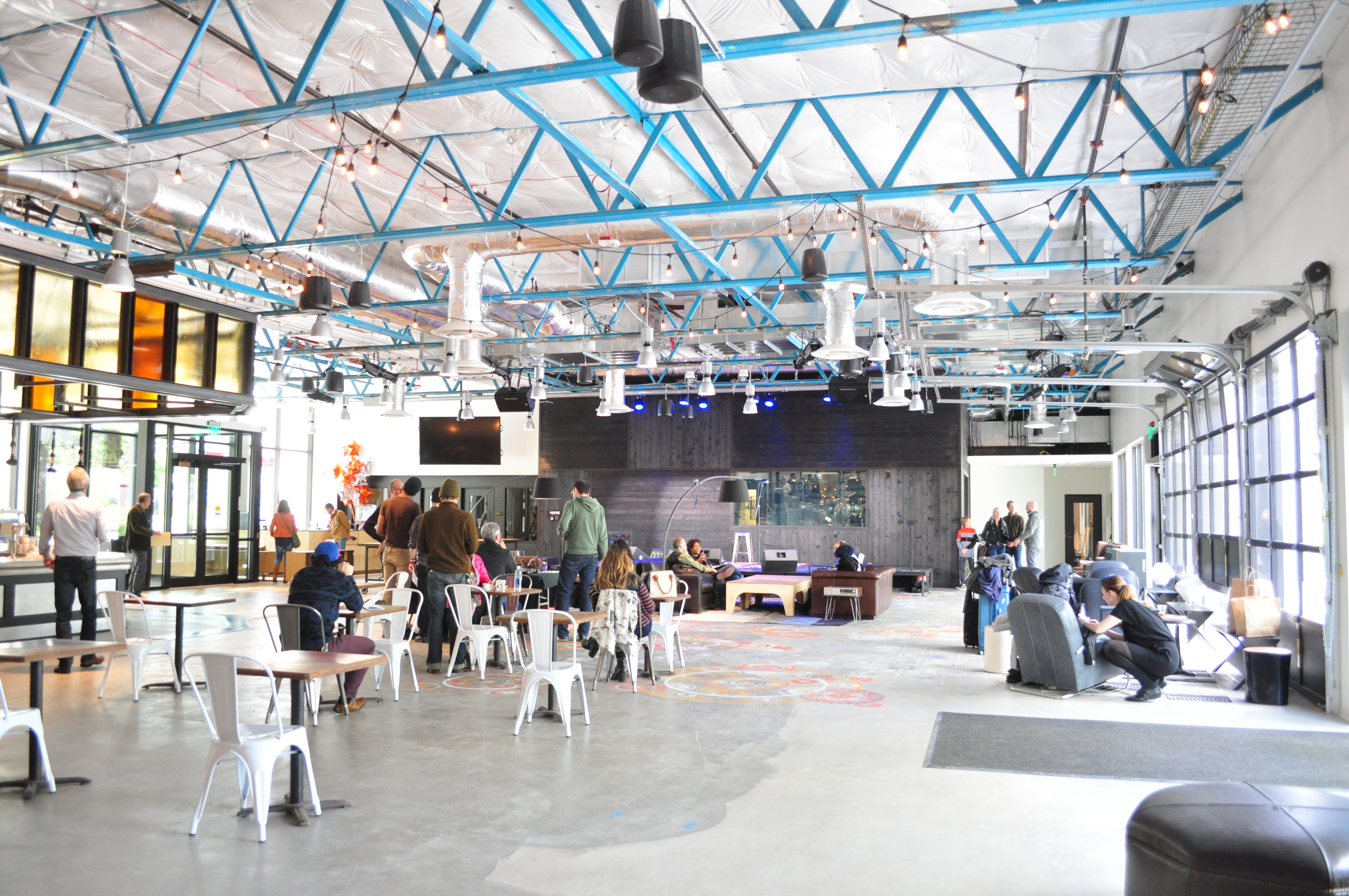
The Gathering Space, the public area of KEXP's studios at the Seattle Center, which opened in April 2016

In 2011, the station announced that it would relocate its studios to the Seattle Center. The new facilities, to be located in the Northwest Rooms area of the center, would enable community members to watch performances and provide more room. The Seattle Center facility opened in December 2015 with a $15 million capital campaign, chaired by Mike McCready of Pearl Jam, nearly complete; a group of staffers paraded from the Dexter Avenue facility to the new studios. By the time of the move, KEXP was reaching 206,000 listeners a week, a quarter of them streaming the station.

Friends of KEXP, the non-profit created in 2001 to manage the station as part of the EMP partnership, purchased the station license from the UW in 2014 for $4 million in a transition suggested by university officials amidst the Seattle Center capital campaign. The $4 million was provided in $400,000 a year of on-air announcements and advertising over 10 years.

In 2018, KEXP announced that it had received a bequest of nearly $10 million from an anonymous out-of-state listener identified only as "Suzanne", which would be used to establish a permanent endowment, fund an education and outreach team, and deepen the station's work with musicians. The station attributed its ability to secure the bequest to efforts to grow relationships with donors started during the capital campaign. That year, the station also announced that it would be the "official music partner" of the Seattle Kraken, responsible for all in-game music and music entertainment surrounding the team.

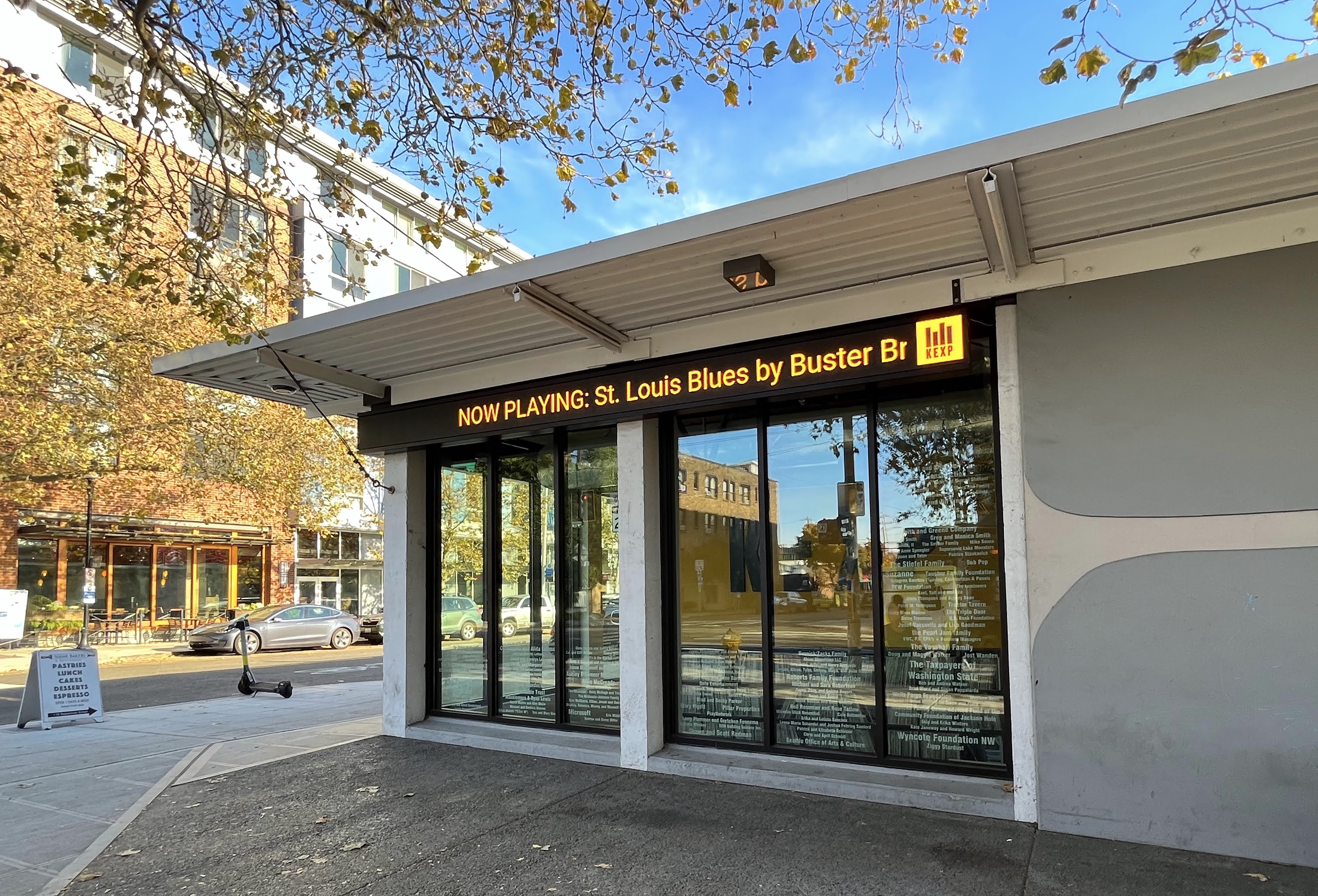
The 1st Avenue North side of the Seattle Center studio building

=== Programming during and after the COVID-19 lockdown (2020–present) ===
The COVID-19 pandemic in 2020 posed substantial financial challenges for KEXP. This resulted in staff layoffs, budget cuts, and a heightened reliance on direct support from listeners to compensate for the loss of underwriting revenue from businesses. At the same time, KEXP had to adapt its programming to meet the increased demand from listeners who turned to online streaming. DJs continued to be on air, but had to broadcast remotely and would adjust their music selection in real-time in response to an influx of listener messages. As the performance space was closed and musicians cancelled tours, KEXP introduced "Live on KEXP at Home", a format in which artists would prepare recorded performances that were played on air while discussing them live with a DJ virtually.

Under the backdrop of the George Floyd protests in Seattle in July 2020, KEXP revamped its lineup and its programming as part an initiative to increasing the diversity of the music and its staff. Two Black DJs (Larry Mizell, Jr. and Gabriel Teodros) were promoted to leadership positions at the station, and they were added to daytime slots that had been held solely by Richards, Cheryl Waters, and Kevin Cole. After a 2019 analysis by Tableau Software found that 24 of the top 25 artists played on the station in 2019 were predominantly White, the station broadened its mix of music.

Tom Mara, who was executive director of KCMU and KEXP for 31 years and who had volunteered for the station in the late 1980s as a UW student, announced his retirement as of June 30, 2022. Under Mara, the station had grown to $12.5 million in annual revenue by 2020; its average rating in Seattle had more than tripled from 1.1 to 3.7 between 2019 and 2022. The station opted to promote its chief operating officer, Ethan Raup, to CEO. Mara later announced that he would become the executive director of the Seattle International Film Festival instead of retiring altogether.

In 2022, KEXP celebrated its 50th anniversary of broadcasting dating to the start of KCMU. For the occasion, the station hosted a series of concerts named KEXP50, which featured two stages located in the courtyard and within the Gathering Space. Prior to the event, KEXP had been actively celebrating its anniversary with special programming highlighting the music history since its establishment in 1972, focusing on one year of music every week. In 2023, KEXP announced several changes to its schedule effective in September, including the removal of several existing shows and the addition of new programs focusing on Asian and indigenous music.

=== Expansion to San Francisco ===
In October 2023, Friends of KEXP bought KREV (92.7 FM), a radio station licensed to Alameda, California, and serving the San Francisco Bay Area, at a bankruptcy auction for $3.75 million. The acquisition was financed through the investment fund set up after anonymous donor Suzanne's $10 million bequest in 2018. The station was slated to air most of KEXP's programming as well as a Bay Area music program featuring local artists in the mold of KEXP's Audioasis. KEXP management expected the deal to result in positive cash flow "within the first few years". KREV was relaunched as KEXC on March 19, 2024, following a weekend-long period of stunting. On August 6, the show was announced as Vinelands, hosted by Kelley Stoltz and Gabriel Lopez from the studios of KQED-FM as part of a partnership between the two public media broadcasters to house KEXP's San Francisco staff and studio broadcasts in KQED's facility.

== Programming ==
On weekdays, KEXP airs five daytime shows in a variety mix format—Early (5–7 a.m.), The Morning Show (7–10 a.m.), The Midday Show (10 a.m.–1 p.m.), The Afternoon Show (1–4 p.m.) and Drive Time (4–7 p.m.). Since 2020, the station has also made major changes to its programming and DJ lineup, and it airs specialty shows throughout the week to diversify from its traditional focus on alternative and indie music. As of April 2024, KEXP's specialty shows include the following:

- Astral Plane: Psychedelic music across multiple decades and genres.
- Audioasis: Pacific Northwest music. When this show airs in Seattle and online, KEXC listeners hear Vinelands, a local music program for the Bay Area.
- The Continent: African music, including Afrobeat.
- Eastern Echoes: Asian music and music from the Asian diaspora.
- El Sonido: Latin music, with a focus on the growing Latin alternative scene.
- Mechanical Breakdown: dark wave and post-punk.
- Positive Vibrations: ska, roots reggae, and "all styles of Jamaican musical expression".
- The Roadhouse: roots, blues, and other traditional styles of American folk music.
- Sounds of Survivance: Global Indigenous music.
- Street Sounds: KEXP's weekly rap/hip-hop show.
- Wo' Pop: World music.

KEXP has also maintained a YouTube channel since 2007, when it started to experiment with bringing video cameras into its live room. The YouTube channel sees a wider global reach than its music broadcasting. The station is estimated to have 180,000 weekly listeners on the airwaves; its YouTube channel now has more than 3 million subscribers, and 75% of the channel's views come from outside the United States. In addition to live performances recorded at the station, KEXP has started covering music festivals outside the U.S., hosting annual sessions at Iceland Airwaves and Rencontres Trans Musicales. Kevin Cole, KEXP's DJ and chief content officer, attributes Of Monsters and Men's early success to the station's Iceland Airwaves coverage.

== Gathering Space ==
KEXP maintains a public communal space known as the Gathering Space, situated on the northwest corner of the Seattle Center at the intersection of Republican Street and 1st Avenue North. Inaugurated in December 2015, the Gathering Space was planned as part of KEXP's relocation from its previous Dexter Avenue facility. The Seattle Center building is four times larger than the old studio and features amenities such as a public performance stage, a courtyard, an indoor viewing gallery, and dedicated shower and laundry facilities for musicians.

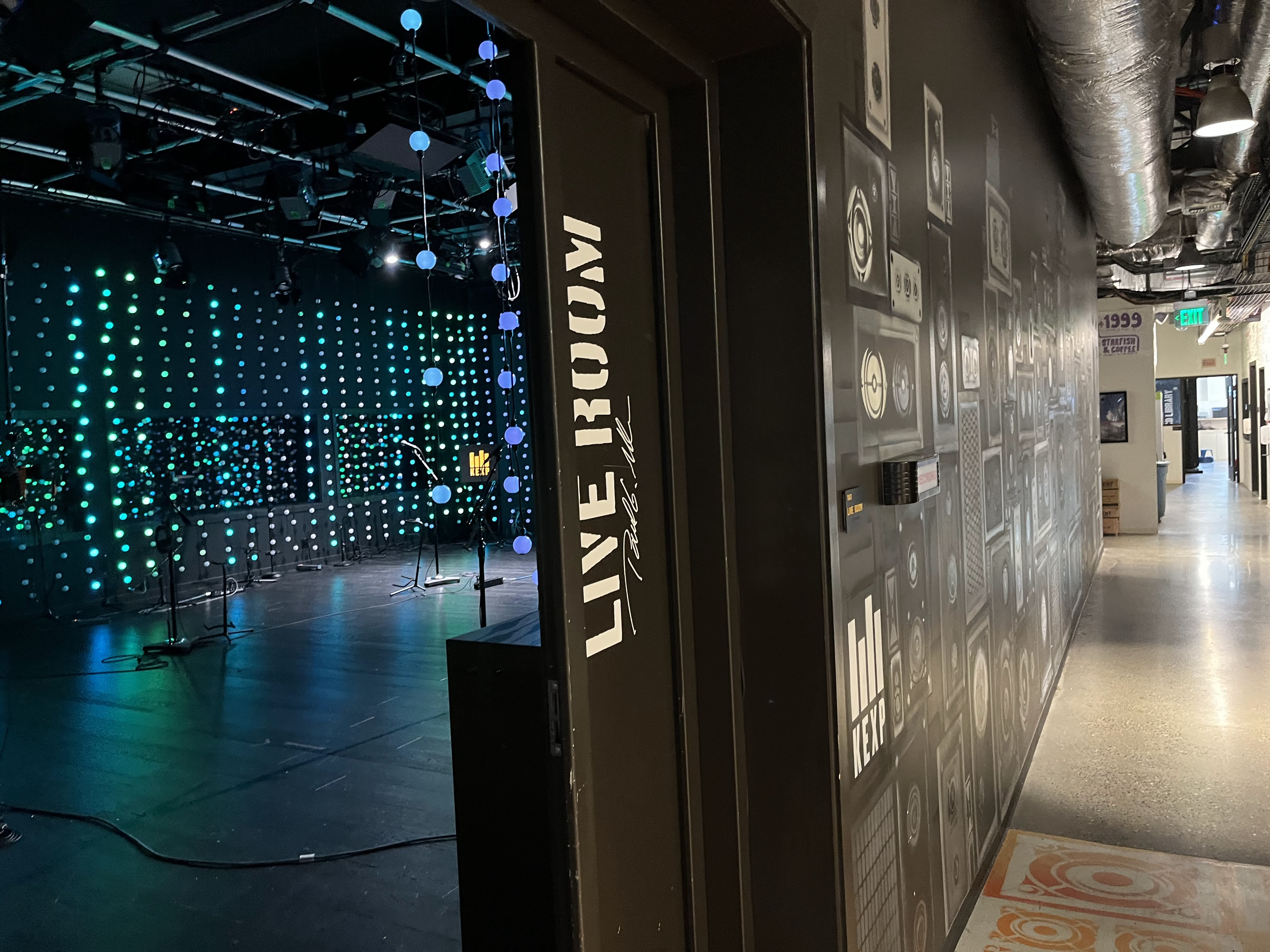
The live room seen from the studio hallway, with lighting inspired by twinkly Christmas lights

As well as the public performance stage, the Gathering Space also features a live room, along with a viewing gallery that holds up to 75 performance attendees. The live room serves as the backdrop for the station's video podcasts. The lighting system, donated by Microsoft, features festoon lights that respond to the motion of performers through the use of three Microsoft Kinects connected to the control room. The background harkens back to that used in the videos on KEXP's Dexter Avenue studios, a series of Christmas lights that Cwynar credits for providing a distinctive look to KEXP's video output, analogous to the set for NPR's Tiny Desk Concerts.

The Gathering Space has included a coffee shop since its inception. The first coffee shop was operated by La Marzocco, an Italian espresso machine manufacturer whose U.S. operations were based in Seattle, and featured an espresso machine showroom and a monthly rotation of roasters from around the world. In 2021, La Marzocco handed its cafe operations to Caffé Vita, and a new coffee shop called Vita at KEXP opened in place of the old cafe.

The current site of the Gathering Space is near a proposed location for the new Seattle Center light rail station, which is being built as part of the Ballard Link Extension. If constructed, the underground train station would be excavated adjacent to the north walls of the building housing KEXP and close to its studios. In 2022, KEXP and four other arts organizations wrote to Sound Transit, Seattle's regional transit agency, expressing concern that the construction of the new station could displace them for as long as five years. Despite an alternative proposal by city officials suggesting the use of a site on Mercer Street, situated a block north, the Sound Transit board ultimately voted in favor of a Seattle Center station on Republican Street on March 23, 2023.
