= KJLS =

- Hays, Kansas; United States
- Frequency: 103.3 MHz
- Branding: Mix 103.3

Programming
- Format: Hot AC

Ownership
- Owner: Eagle Communications, Inc.

History
- Call sign meaning: Larry Steckline

Technical information
- Licensing authority: FCC
- Facility ID: 54892
- Class: C
- ERP: 100,000 watts
- HAAT: 303 meters (994 ft)
- Transmitter coordinates: 39°01′15″N 99°28′15″W

Links
- Public license information: Public file; LMS
- Website: hayspost.com/mix-103-home-of-the-no-repeat-workday

KJLS is a radio station airing a Hot AC format licensed to Hays, Kansas, United States, broadcasting on 103.3 FM. The station is owned by Eagle Communications, Inc.

In 1974, when FM radio was relatively new, Kansas radio entrepreneur and personality Larry Steckline established KJLS (whose call sign ends in Steckline's initials) as a country-western music station. According to Steckline, it was the first FM station to survive west of U.S. Highway 81 (the north-south highway in the center of the nation).
