= WZND-LP =

Low-power FM radio station at Illinois State University in Bloomington, Illinois

- Normal, Illinois; United States
- Broadcast area: Bloomington-Normal, Illinois
- Frequency: 103.3 MHz
- Branding: WZND Fuzed Radio

Programming
- Format: College radio, top 40

Ownership
- Owner: Illinois State University Foundation
- Sister stations: WGLT

History
- First air date: 1965 (WILN); March 28, 1981 (WZND); September 21, 2004 (WEWT-LP); September 27, 2011 (WZND-LP)
- Former call signs: WEWT-LP (2004–2011)

Technical information
- Licensing authority: FCC
- Facility ID: 126023
- Class: L1
- ERP: 23 watts
- HAAT: 61.6 meters (202 ft)
- Transmitter coordinates: 40.508186°N 88.987766°W

Links
- Public license information: LMS
- Website: wznd.com

WZND-LP (103.3 FM) is a low-power FM radio station licensed for Bloomington, McLean County, Illinois, United States. The station is staffed by students of Illinois State University and airs music from genres including rock, hip-hop, classic, pop, and country. WZND has received many awards including the 2018 BEA Best College Station in the Nation award.

== History ==
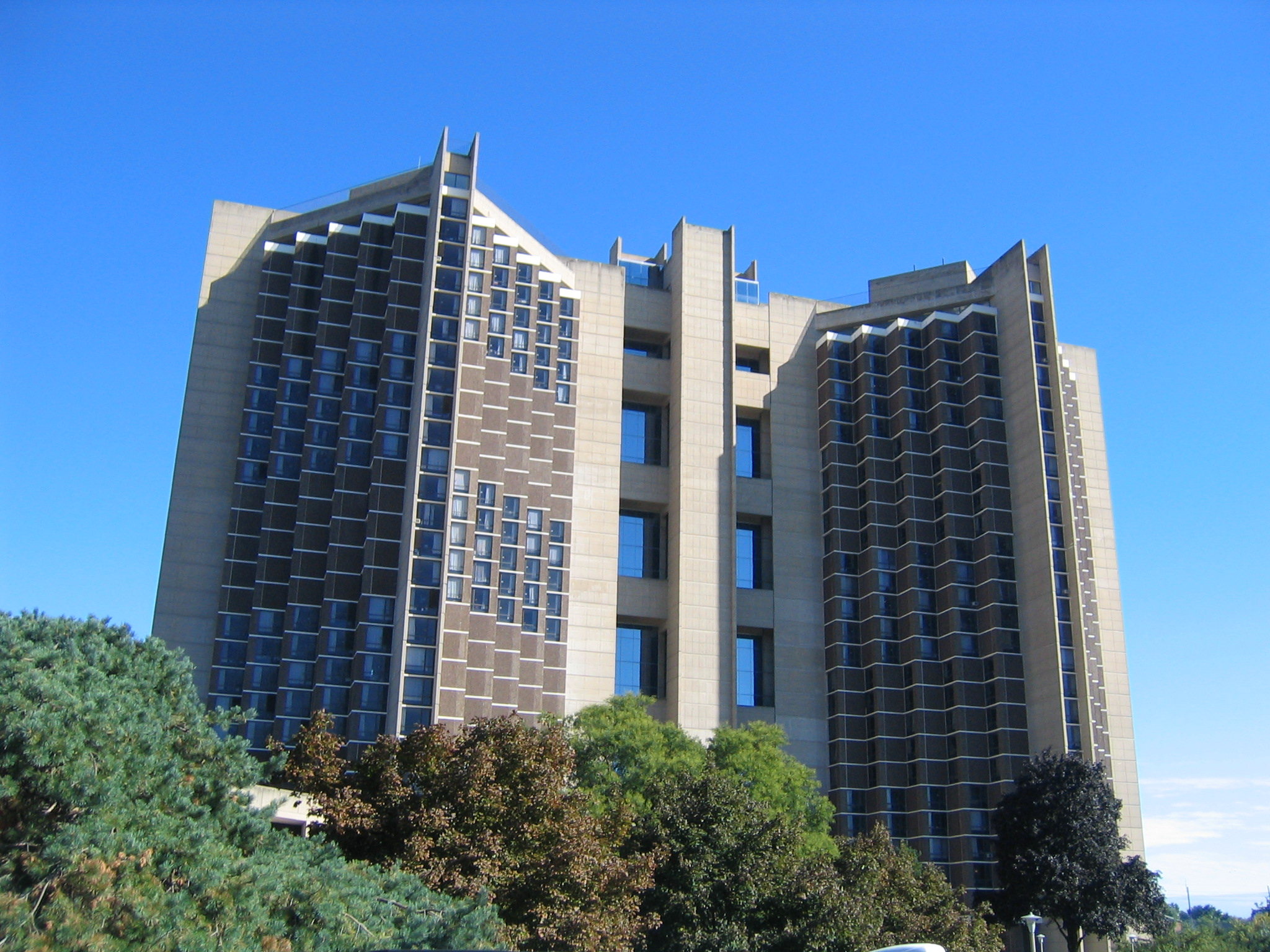
Watterson Towers, transmitting location of WZND-LP

=== ISU student radio ===
Student broadcasting at Illinois State University began in 1935 in a partnership with McLean County radio station WJBC. WILN, a campus radio station, was started in 1965 with the assistance of Ruth Yates and broadcast to the dorms.

On March 18, 1981, WILN changed its name to WZND and began broadcasting via carrier current on 106.1 FM and 540 AM. At first branded "The Sound" and later in 1983 "Cable’s Hot Music FM, The New WZND", the station reached five thousand to ten thousand people. WZND broadcast progressive rock, new wave sound, soul, and aired local soul, jazz, and spot band music. In 2001 WZND rebranded to Z106 and broadcast alternative and hip hop music. On April 4, 2007, WZND switched formats to include 90s music in addition to alternative rock. In January 2010, WZND changed to a college shuffle format, playing a wide variety of genres. The station was rebranded "WZND Fuzed Radio".

WZND has had several locations on campus. Its original location was in Cook Hall in 1981, but moved to Old Union (then called the Media Services Building) in 1985. In the spring of 1994, WZND relocated to its current location in the basement of Fell Hall.

=== 103.3 ===
Truth 103.3 logo

Rock In Victory Ministries, Inc., a Catholic ministry, received a license for WEWT-LP on 103.3, and began broadcasting on September 21, 2004, airing a Christian contemporary music format.

The Illinois State University Foundation acquired the 103.3 broadcast license on September 14, 2011. Truth 103 shut down FM broadcasting in the early morning hours of September 16, 2011 for financial reasons, but Truth 103 continued as an Internet streaming program afterwards.

=== WZND-LP ===
103.3 came back on the air at 1 p.m. on Tuesday, September 27, 2011, broadcasting the existing Illinois State University campus radio station, WZND. The 103.3 call sign officially changed from WEWT-LP to WZND-LP on October 12, 2011.

In 2013, WZND was featured nationally on mtvU.

== See also ==
- Campus radio
- List of college radio stations in the United States
