= John Richards (radio personality) =

American radio personality

John Richards is an American radio personality. Originally from Coeur d'Alene, Idaho, he grew up in Spokane, Washington before moving to Seattle. He is the host and producer of The Morning Show on 90.3 FM KEXP Seattle, Washington. He is also KEXP's director of programming and is referred to on air as "John in the Morning". His show is on weekday mornings from 7AM-10AM PST, and often begins with the theme song written specifically for The Morning Show by local Seattle musician Damien Jurado.

Richards works on a number of music projects outside of radio. He hosted the music video program The Local Music Show on the local Seattle Channel.

Richards created International Clash Day in 2013 "for no other reason than the fact that he could." It is now celebrated across the world, not only in the State of Washington, but in Austin, Ithaca, Kent, San Francisco, Seattle, Tucson, Vancouver B.C., Bridgwater (UK), and Washington D.C.

Richards has done an annual "Mom Show" since 2004: On November 13, the anniversary of his mother's death, his show features song requests and messages from listeners that deal with the shared experience of grief.

Richards' annual "Songs of Love and Hate" show features "songs of yearning, lust, loss, and heartbreak" on Valentine's Day.
