= KQSP =

Coordinates: 44°48′26″N 93°33′25″W

Shakopee, Minnesota; United States
- Broadcast area: Minneapolis-St. Paul, Minnesota
- Frequency: 1530 kHz

Programming
- Format: Defunct
- Affiliations: USA Radio Network; Indianapolis Motor Speedway Radio Network; Motor Racing Network; Performance Racing Network

Ownership
- Owner: Fred Weinberg and Floyd Brown; (Nevada Radio, LLC)

History
- First air date: October 6, 1963 (as KISM)
- Former call signs: KISM (1963–1964); KSMM (1964–1987); KKCM (1987–1998); KSMM (1998–2006)

Technical information
- Facility ID: 49307
- Class: D
- Power: 8,600 watts (daytime); 10 watts (nighttime)

KQSP (1530 AM) was a radio station licensed to Shakopee, Minnesota and serving the western suburbs of Minneapolis. Last owned by Nevada Radio, LLC, the station, when on the air, passed through the master schedule of the USA Radio Network with no locally originated programming outside station identifications, along with radio coverage of NASCAR from the circuit's three radio networks (though as of 2023, the websites of those networks did not contain KQSP as an affiliate). The station's transmitter site was in Chanhassen.

KQSP's nighttime range with ten watts barely covered its community of license.

== History ==
Until March 1987, the call sign was KSMM as a 500-watt daytime operation, airing a Full Service MOR format. From that point until August 1998, it was KKCM (airing religious formats), before reverting to its previous calls. It upgraded the power to 8,600 watts after adopting the KKCM call sign.

The station was limited for many years by a predominantly daytime-only signal (though its 10-watt nighttime signal covered a few far-western suburbs).

Over the years, there were many owners and formats. Since 1999, there were at least six different formats. From 2004 until 2005, the station was leased, along with WMIN, to a group that programmed local and syndicated progressive talk programming, primarily from Air America Radio. When the format's programmers purchased KTNF in October 2004 and transferred programming there, KSMM was up for sale again, and played random music before returning to a Spanish-language format.

In June 1999, after an ill-fated try with a smooth jazz/talk format, the station started playing a variety of songs mixed with listener commentary, experimenting with the musical selection to find a mix that the southwest metro community liked. This evolved into a rather eclectic format that played a great deal of classic hits. Eventually, shows from the former REV105 appeared, and guest DJ shows from local bands were also featured. This free-wheeling approach was never intended to be permanent, but was in anticipation of a sale of the station, which occurred in 2000 when the new owner changed to a Mexican music format in August of that year.

Starboard Broadcasting agreed to purchase the station in September 2002 to serve as a charter station for their Relevant Radio network, along with Spanish-language Catholic-based programming from EWTN. Starboard also purchased a stronger station on 1330 AM and consolidated all of their programming there in 2004. The station was sold once again to Broadcast One, owned by Yong Kim, in June 2006.

On September 11, 2006, the station's call sign was changed to KQSP, and the format switched to tropical music.

On June 20, 2011 KQSP changed its format to urban oldies, branded as "Magic 1530".

The station went silent pending a format change in February 2013, and returned on the air a week later with a tropical format.

In January 2017, the station went silent again, returning to the air on October 18, 2017, when Broadcast One sold KQSP to Nevada Radio for $200,000. Since then, it was entirely automated from the USA Radio Network (whose principal owners are the heads of Nevada Radio). The station did not have a local studio beginning in the early 2010s, when Relevant Radio received permission to centralcast their stations, and stopped hosting KQSP's main studios.

After being off air for well over a year, the FCC sent a letter to the owners asking for evidence regarding its silence and if the station has equipment on-hand to broadcast. Stations which have not operated for 365 consecutive days are subject to the cancellation of their broadcast license, and there was no evidence of KQSP broadcasting since at least December 2021 or slightly earlier. On February 13, 2023, it was reported that the letter to Nevada Radio LLC inquring about KQSP's operational status was returned to the FCC as undeliverable. On March 23, 2023, the FCC deleted KQSP's license in response to a letter from the attorneys for Nevada Radio LLC, which surrendered the license for cancellation as of March 22.
