= XHCPAF-FM =

Radio station in Iguala, Guerrero, Mexico

XHUTG-FM
Iguala, Guerrero, Mexico; Mexico
- Frequency: 103.3 MHz
- Branding: Radio Universidad

Programming
- Format: Mexican college

Ownership
- Owner: Universidad Tecnológica de la Región Norte de Guerrero

History
- First air date: 2016 (as XHUTG-FM)
- Former call signs: XHUTG-FM (2013-16)
- Former frequencies: 98.5 MHz (2013-16)
- Call sign meaning: (templated callsign)

Technical information
- Class: A
- ERP: 3 kW
- HAAT: -268 meters
- Transmitter coordinates: 18°21′55.75″N 99°32′5.33″W

Links
- Website: utrng.edu.mx

XHCPAF-FM is a Mexican college radio station owned by the Universidad Tecnológica de la Region Norte de Guerrero in Iguala. The station broadcasts on 103.3 MHz and is the only licensed university radio station in the state of Guerrero.

== History ==
The UTRNG first received a radio station permit in 2013 for XHUTG-FM 98.5. The station did not come to air for another three years. However, in that time, the university also failed to transition its permit to a public use concession and thus lost the frequency. As a result, the UTRNG filed for a new public station allocation at Iguala and received XHCPAF-FM 103.3 in October 2018, beginning operations by December.
