= KMML =

Simulcast of KWKR, Leoti, KS
- Cimarron, Kansas; United States
- Broadcast area: Southwest Kansas
- Frequency: 92.9 MHz
- Branding: The Rock 99.9

Programming
- Format: Mainstream rock

Ownership
- Owner: David Murfin; (Western Kansas Broadcast Center, LLC)

History
- First air date: 1983

Technical information
- Licensing authority: FCC
- Facility ID: 164238
- Class: C2
- ERP: 32,000 watts horizontal; 100,000 watts vertical
- HAAT: 186 meters (610 ft)
- Transmitter coordinates: 37°56′29.6″N 100°18′44.3″W

Links
- Public license information: Public file; LMS

KMML (92.9 FM) is a commercial radio station licensed to Cimarron, Kansas, United States. The station is currently owned by David Murfin, through licensee Western Kansas Broadcast Center, LLC.

The KMML callsign was previously used in Amarillo, Texas by Mel Tillis for a country station broadcasting on 98.7 MHz acquired in 1983, moved to 96.9 MHz 1993–2007.

On December 2, 2019, KMML's local marketing agreement with Rocking M Media ended and the regional Mexican format moved to KZRD, with KMML going silent. In November 2020, KMML began simulcasting KWKR Leoti's mainstream rock format.
