= KNGS-LP =

- Hanford, California; United States
- Frequency: 100.7 MHz
- Branding: KKDJ

Programming
- Format: Classic hits

Ownership
- Owner: First Unitarian Universal Life Church of Hanford

History
- First air date: October 15, 2015
- Former call signs: KOOH-LP (2015–2020)
- Former frequencies: 104.5 MHz (2015–2020)

Technical information
- Licensing authority: FCC
- Facility ID: 196319
- Class: L1
- ERP: 100 watts
- HAAT: 23.1 meters (76 ft)
- Transmitter coordinates: 36°19′40″N 119°40′34″W
- Translator: 102.3 K272GD (South Fresno)

Links
- Public license information: LMS

KNGS-LP (100.7 FM) is a low-power FM radio station licensed to Hanford, California, United States. It is owned by the First Unitarian Universal Life Church of Hanford.

== History ==
KNGS-LP started broadcasting on October 15, 2015, as KOOH-LP at 104.5 MHz. It moved to 100.7 MHz in 2020 because of interference caused when Fresno translator K283CY (for KWRU (1300 AM)) began broadcasting.
