= KAHE =

Radio station in Dodge City, Kansas

- Dodge City, Kansas; United States
- Broadcast area: Southwest Kansas
- Frequency: 95.5 MHz
- Branding: Superhits K95

Programming
- Format: Classic hits
- Affiliations: Fox News Radio

Ownership
- Owner: Kansas Broadcast Company, LLC
- Sister stations: KERP, KGNO, KZRD

History
- First air date: May 1966
- Former call signs: KGNO-FM (1966–1980); KDCK (1980–1993); KOLS (1993–2008)

Technical information
- Licensing authority: FCC
- Facility ID: 37131
- Class: C1
- ERP: 100,000 watts
- HAAT: 176 meters (577 ft)
- Transmitter coordinates: 37°38′28″N 100°20′40″W

Links
- Public license information: Public file; LMS
- Webcast: KAHE Webstream
- Website: KAHE Online

KAHE (95.5 FM, "Super Hits K95") is a radio station broadcasting a classic hits music format. Licensed to Dodge City, Kansas, United States, the station serves the Southwest Kansas area. The station, established in 1966, is currently owned by Kansas Broadcast Company, LLC.

== History ==
The station was launched in May 1966 as KGNO-FM. On May 2, 1980, the station changed its call sign to KDCK, again on December 20, 1993, to KOLS, and on January 1, 2008, to KAHE.
