= KGNO =

Radio station in Dodge City, Kansas

- Dodge City, Kansas; United States
- Broadcast area: Southwest Kansas
- Frequency: 1370 kHz
- Branding: 1370 KGNO

Programming
- Format: Classic country
- Affiliations: Townhall News; Kansas Jayhawks; Kansas City Royals

Ownership
- Owner: Kansas Broadcast Company, LLC
- Sister stations: KAHE; KERP; KZRD

History
- First air date: June 13, 1930
- Call sign meaning: "Kansas Good Neighbor Operation"

Technical information
- Licensing authority: FCC
- Facility ID: 37130
- Class: B
- Power: 5,000 watts (day); 230 watts (night)
- Transmitter coordinates: 37°45′38.6″N 100°6′03.6″W

Links
- Public license information: Public file; LMS
- Webcast: Listen live
- Website: swksradio.net/kgno

KGNO (1370 AM) is a commercial radio station licensed to Dodge City, Kansas, United States, and serves the Southwestern Kansas area. It is currently owned by Kansas Broadcast Company, LLC. The station airs classic country music, primarily from the 1980s and 1990s, but also dipping back into 1970s, 1960s, and occasionally even 1950s country. Regional interest farm and agriculture programming is also featured on weekdays.

== History ==
On April 7, 1933, the Federal Radio Commission authorized KGNO to increase its power from 100 W to 250 W and to change its frequency from 1210 kHz to 1340 kHz.
