= KZRD =

Radio station in Dodge City, Kansas

- Dodge City, Kansas; United States
- Broadcast area: South West Kansas
- Frequency: 93.9 MHz
- Branding: La Fiesta 93.9

Programming
- Format: Bilingual CHR

Ownership
- Owner: Kansas Broadcast Company, LLC
- Sister stations: KAHE, KERP, KGNO

History
- First air date: December 1997 (as KDGB)
- Former call signs: KDGB (1987–1998); KRPH (1998–2001)
- Call sign meaning: "Buzzard" (former rock format)

Technical information
- Licensing authority: FCC
- Facility ID: 13010
- Class: C1
- Power: 100,000 watts
- HAAT: 246 meters (807 ft)
- Transmitter coordinates: 37°55′56.00″N 100°19′2.00″W

Links
- Public license information: Public file; LMS
- Webcast: Listen Live
- Website: KZRD Online

KZRD (93.9 FM) is a radio station broadcasting a Bilingual Contemporary hit radio format. Licensed to Dodge City, Kansas, United States, the station serves the SW Kansas area. The station is currently owned by Kansas Broadcast Company, LLC.

== History ==
The station was assigned the call letters KDGB on April 22, 1987. On September 19, 1995, the station changed its call sign to KDGB, on January 9, 1998, to KRPH, on June 26, 2001, to the current KZRD. On June 29, 2001, the station was sold to Waitt Radio.On December 5, 2005, the station was sold to NRG Media. In 2007, Rocking M bought NRG's Kansas stations (including KZRD).

In April 2016, KZRD flipped from its long running rock format (as "93.9 The Buzzard") to hot AC, branded as "Buzz 93.9."

On December 2, 2019, KZRD changed their format from hot AC to regional Mexican, branded as "La Mexicana", after the local marketing agreement with KMML (92.9 FM) ended.
