= KOFP-LP =

- Fresno, California; United States
- Frequency: 103.3 MHz

Ownership
- Owner: Idefua Foundation for African Arts and Culture

History
- First air date: April 21, 2015

Technical information
- Licensing authority: FCC
- Facility ID: 195234
- Class: L1
- ERP: 13 watts
- HAAT: 84 meters (276 ft)
- Transmitter coordinates: 36°44′04.80″N 119°47′26.50″W

Links
- Public license information: LMS

KOFP-LP (103.3 FM) is a low-power FM radio station licensed to Fresno, California, United States. It is owned by the Idefua Foundation for African Arts and Culture.

== History ==
KOFP-LP began broadcasting on April 14, 2015.
