= KSMM (AM) =

Radio station in Liberal, Kansas

- Liberal, Kansas; United States
- Frequency: 1470 kHz

Ownership
- Owner: MyTown Media; (My Town Media Inc)

History
- First air date: September 15, 1960 (as KLIB)
- Former call signs: KLIB (1960–1985); KILS (1985–1988); KYUU (1988–2008)

Technical information
- Licensing authority: FCC
- Facility ID: 36752
- Class: D
- Power: 1,000 watts day 170 watts night
- Transmitter coordinates: 37°03′55″N 100°51′59″W

Links
- Public license information: Public file; LMS

KSMM (1470 kHz) is an AM radio station licensed to serve the community of Liberal, Kansas, United States. The station is owned by My Town Media. The transmitter, tower, and studio are just south of Highway 54 on the east side of town.

== History ==
The station was assigned the call sign KLIB by the Federal Communications Commission on July 20, 1960. The station changed the call sign to KILS on March 1, 1985, then to KYUU on October 4, 1988, when it was part of the "LS Network" of Kansas radio entrepreneur Larry Steckline.

The format in 1984/1985 was adult contemporary, and personalities on the air at that time included Paul Maldanado, Tim Malone, and John Jenkinson. Max Libby was the General Manager at one point.

The call sign changed to KSMM on February 13, 2008.

As part of owner Rocking M Media's bankruptcy reorganization, in which 12 stations in Kansas would be auctioned off to new owners, it was announced on October 31, 2022, that Pittsburg-based MyTown Media was the winning bidder for KSMM for $20,000. The sale to MyTown Media was approved by the FCC on March 29, 2023, and was consummated on May 12 of that year.
