= KCMU-LP =

- Napa, California; United States
- Frequency: 103.3 MHz

Programming
- Format: Variety

Ownership
- Owner: Napa Radio Project, Inc.

History
- First air date: July 22, 2015
- Call sign meaning: Owner formerly worked at KCMU in Seattle as a student at the University of Washington

Technical information
- Licensing authority: FCC
- Facility ID: 194626
- Class: L1
- ERP: 0.1 kW
- HAAT: −90.2 meters (−296 ft)
- Transmitter coordinates: 38°17′50.20″N 122°15′44.60″W

Links
- Public license information: LMS
- Website: naparadio.org

KCMU-LP is a low-power FM radio station broadcasting a variety format from Napa, California, on 103.3 FM. It went on the air on July 22, 2015.
