= KTFC (FM) =

- Sioux City, Iowa; United States
- Frequency: 103.3 MHz

Programming
- Format: Christian talk and teaching
- Network: Bott Radio Network

Ownership
- Owner: Bott Radio Network; (Community Broadcasting, Inc.)

History
- First air date: July 1, 1965
- Call sign meaning: "Keep Talking for Christ"

Technical information
- Licensing authority: FCC
- Facility ID: 17199
- Class: C1
- ERP: 100,000 watts
- HAAT: 193 meters
- Transmitter coordinates: 42°29′5.5″N 96°18′20″W
- Translator: K242BE (96.3 FM) Norfolk, NE

Links
- Public license information: Public file; LMS
- Website: bottradionetwork.com/station/103-3-fm-sioux-city-ia/

KTFC (103.3 FM) is a radio station in Sioux City, Iowa, United States. It is owned and operated by the Bott Radio Network, a regional broadcaster of Christian talk and teaching programming. The transmitter is located east of Sioux City.

Prior to being a Bott station, KTFC was a locally run Christian radio station for the Sioux City area under the same ownership for 40 years.

== History ==
On May 16, 1964, Donald A. Swanson applied to the Federal Communications Commission (FCC) for a new FM radio station on 103.3 MHz in Sioux City. The application was granted on August 26 of that year, and KTFC began broadcasting on July 1, 1965. It was on the air for 17 hours a day and broadcast sacred music, news, weather, and church announcements. The Swansons expanded to an AM station, KTFJ (1250 AM) in nearby Dakota City, Nebraska, in 1988; at that time, KTFC's local programming included a daily broadcast for homemakers and weekly Bible quizzes. In 1991, KTFG in Sioux Rapids, Iowa, came on the air as a rebroadcaster of KTFC; it only split from the Sioux City station to air two local church services.

In 1992, Swanson—who, while the owner, quipped, "God owns the radio station; he just lets me run it"—sought relief from high electricity bills to keep the station in operation. He purchased and installed an 80-foot (24 m) wind turbine, acquired from a wind farm in Arizona, near the tower to generate electricity for KTFC. Swanson used profits from a nearby farm to subsidize the station's operation.

Swanson elected to sell KTFC and KTFG to Midwest Bible Radio, a division of the Good News Broadcasting Association of Lincoln, Nebraska, in 2005; no change in format was planned by the new owners. He continued to own KTFJ until his death in 2011. Bott Radio Network, through its subsidiary Community Broadcasting, Inc., purchased KTFC and KTFG in 2007.
