= KWSU =

KWSU may refer to:

- KWSU-TV, a television station (channel 10) licensed to Pullman, Washington, United States
- KWSU (AM), a radio station (1250 AM) licensed to Pullman, Washington, United States
