= KUOW =

KUOW may refer to:

- KUOW (AM), a radio station (1340 AM) licensed to Tumwater, Washington, United States
- KUOW-FM, a radio station (94.9 FM) licensed to Seattle, Washington, United States
