= List of environmental podcasts =

The following is a list of environmental podcasts that focus on environmentalism, sustainability, climate change, and pollution.

== List ==
Podcast	Year	Starring, Narrator(s), or Host(s)	Produced by	Ref
Timber Wars	2020–present	Aaron Scott	Oregon Public Broadcasting	
Inherited	2020	Georgia Wright and Julianna Bradley	Critical Frequency	
Grouse	2020	Ashley Ahearn	BirdNote and Boise State Public Radio	
Living Planet	2021–present	Sam Baker	Deutsche Welle	
Threshold Podcast	2017–present	Amy Martin	Auricle Productions	
CleanLaw	2018–present	Hana Vizcarra, Hannah Perls, Ari Peskoe, Carrie Jenks, Lowry Yankwich, and Jody Freeman	HLS Environmental & Energy Law Program	
Terrestrial	2017	Ashley Ahearn	KUOW	
Mongabay Newscast	2016–present	Mike Gaworecki	Mongabay	
The Energy Gang	2013–present	Ed Crooks	Wood Mackenzie	
The Big One	2019–present	Jacob Margolis and Misha Euceph	KPCC and Southern California Public Radio	
Hot and Dry	2019–present	Cally Carswell, Collin Haffey, and Page Buono	Independent	
Edition Spéciale	2018	Fernand Lot	Radiodiffusion-Télévision Française	
Living on Earth	2001–present	Steve Curwood	World Media Foundation	
Outrage and Optimism	2019–present	Christiana Figueres	Global Optimism	
Sustainable(ish)	2018–present	Jen Gale	Independent	
Target Zero Hunger	2016–present	Sandra Ferrari	Food and Agriculture Organization	
TILclimate	2019–present	Laur Hesse Fisher	MIT Environmental Solutions Initiative	
A Rational Fear	2020–present	Dan Ilic	Independent	
Sustainababble	2015–present	Ol and Dave	Independent	
Green Dreamer	2018–present	Kaméa Chayne	Independent	
Sustainable Asia	2019–present	Marcy Trent Long	Independent	
Podship Earth	2018–present	Jared Blumenfeld	Independent	
The Drawdown Agenda	2018–2019	Fergal Byrne	Independent	
Carbon Removal Newsroom	2019–present	Ramez Naam	Nori	
Direct Current	2016–present		United States Department of Energy	
The Sustainability Agenda	2016–present	Fergal Byrne	Independent	
Infinite Earth Radio	2016–2019	Michael Hancox and Vernice Miller-Travis	Skeo and the Local Government Commission	
Sustainability Defined	2016–present	Jay Siegel and Scott Breen	Independent	
Think: Sustainability	2016–present	Sophie Ellis	2SER 107.3	
Climate One	2007–present	Greg Dalton	Commonwealth Club of California	
Hot Take	2019–present	Amy Westervelt	Crooked Media	
Floodlines	2020–2021	Vann R. Newkirk II	The Atlantic	
Boomtown	2019–present	Christian Wallace	Imperative Entertainment and Texas Monthly	
Mothers of Invention	2018–present	Mary Robinson and Maeve Higgins	Doc Society	
America Adapts the Climate Change Podcast	2016–present	Doug Parsons	Independent	
How to Save a Planet	2019–present	Muna Suleiman	Friends of the Earth	
Emergence Magazine Podcast	2018–present	Various	Kalliopeia Foundation	
For What It's Earth	2019–present	Emma Brisdion and Lloyd Hopkins	Independent	
The Crisis	2021–present	Ramon Campos, Sayre Quevedo, and Agnes Walton	Vice	
Broken Ground	2019–present	Claudine Ebeid McElwain	Southern Environmental Law Center	
Life Raft	2020–present	Lauren Malara and Travis Lux	WWNO and WRKF	
Costing The Earth	2021–present	Thais and Lina	BBC Radio	
Climate Cast	2021–present	Paul Huttner	Minnesota Public Radio	
A Climate Change Podcast	2017–2019	Rajesh, Dave, and Curt Newton	MIT ClimateX	
Yikes	2020–present	Mikaela Loach and Jo Becker	Finlay Mowat	

== See also ==
- Popular science
- Environmental journalism
