= KNWU =

KNWU may refer to:

- KNWU (FM), a radio station (91.5 FM) licensed to serve Forks, Washington, the United States
- Royal Dutch Cycling Union, (In Dutch: KNWU, Koninklijke Nederlandsche Wielren Unie)
