= KVTI =

Northwest Public Radio station in Tacoma, Washington

Coordinates: 47.161°N 122.578°W

- Tacoma, Washington; United States
- Broadcast area: Seattle/Tacoma
- Frequency: 90.9 MHz FM
- Branding: Northwest Public Broadcasting

Programming
- Format: Public radio; News/Talk, Classical

Ownership
- Owner: Clover Park Technical College
- Operator: Washington State University

History
- First air date: 1955
- Former call signs: KCPS (1955–1972); KPEC-FM (1972-1983)
- Call sign meaning: Vocational Technical Institute

Technical information
- Licensing authority: FCC
- Facility ID: 12068
- Class: C1
- ERP: 51,000 watts
- HAAT: 111 meters

Links
- Public license information: Public file; LMS
- Webcast: Listen live
- Website: nwpb.org

KVTI (90.9 FM) is a National Public Radio affiliate station operated by Northwest Public Radio, licensed to Tacoma, Washington, and operates at 90.9 MHz with an ERP of 51 kW. As an "NPR & Classical Music" station, it broadcasts NPR news, local and syndicated classical music shows (switching to jazz music on weekends), and other public radio programming. The station is owned by Clover Park Technical College in Lakewood, but since 2010, has been operated by the Edward R. Murrow College of Communication at Washington State University. It is one of three NPR member stations in the Seattle/Tacoma area, with fellow Tacoma-based station KNKX and Seattle-based KUOW-FM being the other two stations.

== History ==
The station began in 1955 as KCPS and also had the call letters KPEC-FM from 1972 until 1983. During this time instructors Bill Doane and Bob Piatt brought many radio professionals to speak to their classes and radio veteran Bill Glass claims this was a sound foundation for his career.

From March 1988 until June 2010 KVTI was known as i-91fm and featured Top 40 music (with news in the morning and afternoon), Tuesday nights featured live acoustic music from 7-10PM and Talk and Public Affairs from 10PM to Midnight. In 2006 and 2007, KVTI was recognized as the Top 40 Radio Station of the year by the New Music Awards. In the same ceremonies, music director Beth Valiant was recognized as Top 40 Music Director of the year. In 2008, program director John Mangan was recognized as New Music Weekly's Top 40 Program Director of the Year and music director Beth Valiant won Top 40 Music Director of the Year for the 5th consecutive year.

On April 7, 2010, CPTC announced that it would outsource KVTI's operations to Northwest Public Radio effective June 1, 2010. Washington State University had been looking for some time to enter the Seattle market, even though it would be going head-to-head with two of the highest-rated NPR stations in the country, KUOW-FM and KPLU-FM. However, KVTI's signal is not nearly as strong as its main competitors. While it decently covers Tacoma and Olympia, it only provides grade B coverage of Seattle. It can't be heard at all in major portions of Snohomish County because it is short-spaced to KSER in Everett at 90.7. Fifty-five years of programming and operation by Clover Park students and staff ended at the close of the broadcast day June 16, 2010. On June 17, it became a repeater of Northwest Public Radio's "NPR and Classical Music" service.

CPTC no longer offers radio broadcasting classes.
