= Birds Connect Seattle =

US non-profit organization

- Formation: 1916; 110 years ago
- Type: 501(c)3 non-profit
- Tax ID no.: 91-6009716
- Legal status: 501(c)(3)
- Purpose: urban bird conservation
- Headquarters: Seattle, Washington, U.S.
- Region served: King County, Washington, U.S.
- Board President: Dr. Anthony Floyd
- Executive Director: Claire Catania
- Website: birdsconnectsea.org

Birds Connect Seattle, formerly the Seattle Audubon Society, is a nonprofit environmental organization that advocates and organizes for cities where people and birds thrive. It is a chapter organization of the National Audubon Society, and is one of the oldest natural history organizations in the Pacific Northwest.

The organization is involved in protecting and enhancing urban habitat, reducing urban hazards to birds, and engaging community in conservation and science initiatives directly in their neighborhoods. Its main office is in downtown Seattle, Washington. The Seattle chapter serves a large part of King County, Washington. It collaborates with the Seattle Parks and Recreation Department, the Capitol Hill EcoDistrict, Seattle University, University of Washington, and other local environmental, community, and government entities.

== History ==
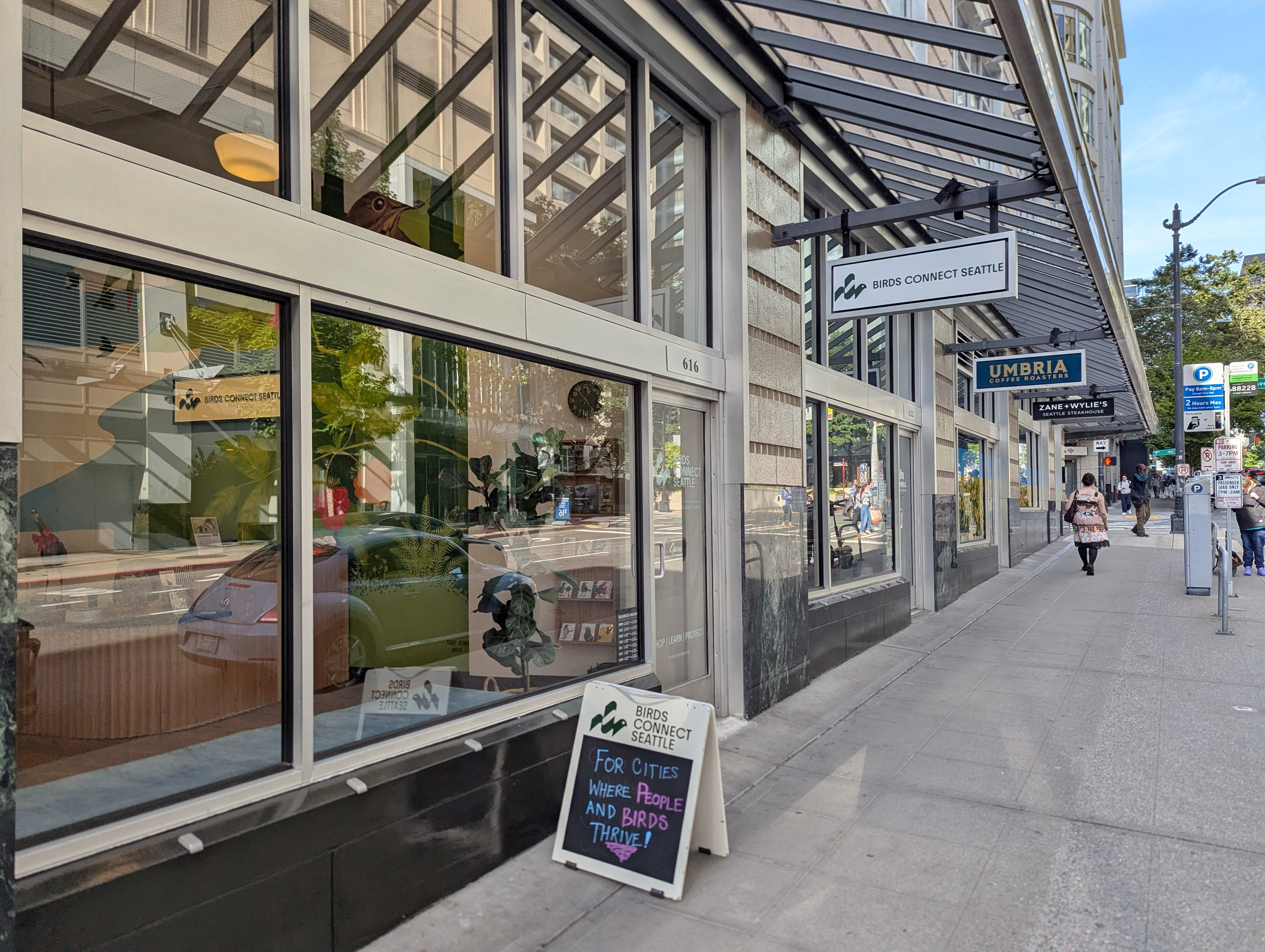
The headquarters of Birds Connect Seattle in Downtown Seattle, 2025

Seattle Audubon was founded in 1916 and is the oldest environmental organization in the state of Washington.

In 2002, Seattle Audubon launched BirdWeb, an online guide including species of special concern, rarities, and a searchable database of birds.

In 2005, BirdNote, a two-minute radio show about birds and nature, created under the auspices of Seattle Audubon, began airing on KPLU, a local National Public Radio affiliate.

In 2020, Seattle Audubon partnered with New York City Audubon to expand dBird.org, an online platform for reporting bird mortality and injury. Scientists and conservationists across North America use dBird.org to track and prevent human-related bird mortality.

In July 2022, the organization became the first large chapter in the National Audubon Society network to publicly declare its intention to remove "Audubon" from the organization's name. In March 2023, the organization announced that it would be renamed to Birds Connect Seattle. The name was chosen after receiving 250 suggestions from members and the public.

Birds Connect Seattle relocated its headquarters from Wedgwood to Downtown Seattle in 2025. The office includes a repository of bird specimens, a gift shop, and events space.

== Programs ==
=== Community science ===
Birds Connect Seattle organizes several community science projects, including the Neighborhood Bird Project, Climate Watch, and the Seattle Bird Collision Monitoring Project.

=== Education ===
Birds Connect Seattle offers classes and field trips about bird identification, ecology, conservation, and more.

=== Urban conservation ===
Birds Connect Seattle works to conserve birds in an urban environment.

==== Urban forestry ====
Birds Connect Seattle has been involved in tree protection in Seattle since its founding when early members advocated for action against illegal tree removal in Seward Park. More recently, its staff have twice served on Seattle's Urban Forestry Commission. The organization advocates for stronger tree protection regulations, improved urban forest management structures, and increased investment in urban forest enhancement.

==== Urban hazards ====
In 2020, Seattle Audubon launched a strategic plan, "Cities at the Center", that put an emphasis on understanding and reducing the impacts of urban hazards on birds. Conservation priorities include understanding and preventing bird-window collisions and reducing pesticide use.
