= Grouse (podcast) =

Podcast about the greater sage-grouse

Grouse is an eight part podcast hosted by Ashley Ahearn and produced by BirdNote and Boise State Public Radio. In each episode Ahearn spends about twenty minutes discussing the greater sage-grouse and various threats to the bird's population.

== Background ==
After reporting on the Standing Rock protests for NPR and seeing that the Dakota Access Pipeline was built despite the protests, Ahearn decided to quit her job and move to rural Winthrop Valley, Washington. The move marked a change in Ahearn's lifestyle, from a life in the city to living in a farmhouse and riding horses. Ahearn also experienced a change in the political demographic from liberal to conservative. Ahearn's experiences drove the story of the podcast, which she notes as a big change from her work at NPR. The podcast focuses on the greater sage-grouse and how the species is being threatened by a variety of changes. Ahearn addresses the fact that climate change is leading to an increase in wildfires that have destroyed sage grouse habitats.

The podcast was produced by BirdNote and Boise State Public Radio. The podcast was an eight part series. Each episode is roughly twenty minutes in length.

Steve Greene of Indiewire called the show "a natural tapestry that melds wide-scope and up-close considerations."

== See also ==
- List of environmental podcasts
