= Mayday USA =

Christian fundamentalist organization

- Formation: c. 2024
- Type: Christian organization, Advocacy group
- Legal status: Active
- Purpose: Anti-abortion and anti-LGBTQ advocacy and traditional family values
- Region served: United States
- Founder: Jenny Donnelly
- Affiliations: Her Voice Movement

Mayday USA has been described as a "Christian fundamentalist group advocating against trans rights" by KUOW. The Stranger has called Mayday USA "an extremist anti-LGBTQ, anti-abortion group". Inspired by a similar group in Peru, Mayday USA has organized a series of five events in the United States, including Houston and Seattle.
