= Northwest Public Broadcasting =

Public radio service of Washington State University

- Type: Public radio network
- Country: United States

Programming
- Affiliations: National Public Radio; PBS

Ownership
- Owner: Washington State University

History
- Founded: May 15, 1922
- Launch date: December 10, 1922
- Former names: Northwest Public Radio; Northwest Public Television

Coverage
- Availability: 24 hours a day

Links
- Webcast: Listen live
- Website: nwpb.org

Northwest Public Broadcasting (NWPB) is the public radio and public television service of Washington State University. It is an affiliate of National Public Radio, Public Radio Exchange and American Public Media. It operates 19 radio stations and 13 translators across Washington state, Oregon, and Idaho, and provides coverage to parts of British Columbia. The network broadcasts public radio news, talk, entertainment, classical music, jazz, and folk music. Station programming is separated into two main program streams, "NPR News" and "NPR & Classical Music", with simulcast periods during Morning Edition, All Things Considered, Weekend Edition and Weekend All Things Considered. Since November 2013, Northwest Public Broadcasting also operates a 24-hour jazz station, KJEM (89.9 FM), broadcasting in the Pullman and Moscow area. NWPB also operates two PBS member television stations, KWSU-TV (channel 10) in Pullman and KTNW (channel 31) in Richland.

NWPB headquarters are in the Murrow Communications Center (Room 382) within the third floor of Jackson Hall on the Edward R. Murrow College of Communication of WSU's main campus on Veterans Way in Pullman, with satellite studios on the first floor of the West Building on the WSU Tri-Cities campus on Crimson Way in Richland, at the Radio-TV Center on the University of Idaho campus on Campus Drive in Moscow, Idaho, and studio offices inside building number 8 (the Learning Resource Center) on the campus of Clover Park Technical College on Steilacoom Boulevard NW in Lakewood, inside the shared studios of secondary PBS member KBTC-TV (channel 28) at the Advanced Technology Center (Building B) on the Central/Mohler campus of Bates Technical College on South 19th Street in Tacoma and inside Suite 10 of the Fuller Quigg building on Palouse Street and inside unit letter A on North Mission Street, both in Wenatchee.

== History ==
WSU, which originated in 1908 as Washington State College, has a long history in broadcasting. NWPB's flagship station, KWSU (1250 AM) in Pullman, signed on December 10, 1922, as KFAE and became KWSC (for Washington State College) in 1925. For many years, it served a large portion of the Pacific Northwest. It became KWSU on March 1, 1969, ten years after Washington State attained university status. Edward R. Murrow began his career at the station, as did Keith Jackson and Barry Serafin. KWSU was a charter member of NPR, and was one of the 90 stations that carried the inaugural broadcast of All Things Considered in 1971.

=== Expansion ===
In 1982, KFAE-FM 89.1 at Richland signed on, bringing public radio to the Tri-Cities for the first time. The next year, WSU activated a series of low-powered translators at Ellensburg, Goldendale/The Dalles, Yakima, Lewiston/Clarkston, Ephrata/Soap Lake, Wenatchee, Cashmere/Dryden, and Chelan/Waterville. In 1984, after budget cuts in Idaho, WSU assumed operation of KUID-FM 91.7 at the University of Idaho and renamed it KRFA-FM; this gave it its first FM service in the Pullman area and resulted in the new outlet assuming many of the classical programs on KWSU.

The launch of KNWR, a full-power transmitter at Ellensburg, in 1992 heralded the beginning of two decades of expansion. KNWY in the Yakima Valley went on air in 1993. In 1994, KNWO in Cottonwood, Idaho, was added; additionally, three new translators were commissioned and KRFA increased its power tenfold. KNWV went on air in Lewiston and Clarkston in 1995. KWWS in Walla Walla was added in 1997; the network also signed on KLWS at Mses Lake after a $500,000 donation from the estate of Ephrata rancher Paul Lauzier. Port Angeles—and Victoria, British Columbia—were added with the signing on of KNWP in 1998. KQWS at Omak began broadcasting in January 1999; the next year, a translator of KWSU was added in Pullman, giving the station its first FM presence. A translator at Forks was added in 2006. KSWS at Chehalis was built in 2010.

In several cases, the university acquired or began broadcasting over preexisting public radio stations. On January 6, 1997, Northern Sound Public Radio's KZAZ-FM in Bellingham, was merged into the network as its first station west of the Cascades. The license for KMWS at Mount Vernon was acquired from Skagit Valley College, which moved its KSVR to a new license; the university chose the call letters to honor Murrow, a Skagit County native.

In 2010, KVTI in Tacoma, owned by Clover Park Technical College, began broadcasting Northwest Public Broadcasting full-time after budget cuts prompted the closure of its radio broadcasting program. In 2012, the Yakima School District's KYVT began broadcasting NWPB's NPR News programming under an agreement in which the network provided the district's skills center and an HD2 subchannel for its student programming in exchange for studio space and a primary frequency for the news service, which had not been previously available in Yakima.

On November 1, 2013, WSU launched a third station in Pullman: KJEM (89.9 FM), broadcasting jazz music 24 hours a day to the Pullman and Moscow area and named for J. Elroy McCaw.

In 2018, Northwest Public Radio merged with Northwest Public Television to become Northwest Public Broadcasting. NWPB broadcasts KWSU-TV (channel 10) from Kamiak Butte to serve the eastern Washington and western Idaho covering Pullman to Spokane. KTNW (channel 31) broadcasts from Richland and covers the Tri-Cities area.

On April 19, 2022, the Sleeping Lady Foundation's KOHO-FM began broadcasting NWPB's Jazz programming based at KJEM under a programming and services agreement, bringing NWPB's Jazz network to Central Washington for the first time.

In 2024, Northwest Public Broadcasting launched Press A to Play, an original radio radio show featuring video game music.

WSU and NWPB announced in October 2025 that KWSU-TV would cease operations on December 31; the closure followed the loss of federal funding for the Corporation for Public Broadcasting and a $1.8 million cut to NWPB's budget. NWPB's radio network and KTNW will continue operations; KWSU donors will retain access to PBS Passport via KTNW, and other PBS programming will remain available in the Pullman and Spokane areas via KSPS-TV and Idaho Public Television.

== Stations ==
With one exception, NWPB's transmitters are structured into two services: an NPR news/talk service based on KWSU, and a combined NPR and classical music service based on KRFA.

=== NPR News ===
Call sign	Frequency	City of license	Facility ID	Power; (W)	ERP; (W)	HAAT	Class	Transmitter coordinates	FCC info
KLWS	91.5 FM	Moses Lake, Washington	71043	—N/a	7,200	209 m (686 ft)	C2	47°18′49.5″N 119°34′59.1″W	LMS
KMWS	89.7 FM	Mount Vernon, Washington	60531	—N/a	1,500	40.74 m (134 ft)	A	48°32′29.4″N 122°17′47.6″W	LMS
KQWS	90.1 FM	Omak, Washington	81164	—N/a	3,000	743.12 m (2,438 ft)	C1	48°44′36.5″N 119°37′20.2″W	LMS
KSWS	88.9 FM (HD)	Chehalis, Washington	81162	—N/a	1,000	321.35 m (1,054 ft)	C3	46°33′15.4″N 123°3′30.5″W	LMS
KWSU	1250 AM	Pullman, Washington	71025	5,000 (day); 2,500 (night)	—N/a	—N/a	B	46°41′45.19″N 117°14′49.23″W	LMS
KWWS	89.7 FM	Walla Walla, Washington	71044	—N/a	16,000	403.25 m (1,323 ft)	C1	45°59′3.8″N 118°10′13.3″W	LMS
KYVT	88.5 FM	Yakima, Washington	74320	—N/a	135	260.61 m (855 ft)	A	46°31′56.5″N 120°30′47.6″W	LMS

Broadcast translators for NPR News
Call sign	Frequency	City of license	FID	ERP (W)	HAAT	Class	Transmitter coordinates	FCC info
K210DK	89.9 FM	Ellensburg, Washington	71035	91	374.07 m (1,227 ft)	D	46°53′14.4″N 120°26′32.2″W	LMS
K212FK	90.3 FM	Wenatchee, Washington	71037	50	774.44 m (2,541 ft)	D	47°32′59.4″N 120°22′14.2″W	LMS
K216GE	91.1 FM	Forks, Washington	138015	130	−2.6 m (−9 ft)	D	47°55′59.2″N 124°23′45.7″W	LMS
K217AJ	91.3 FM	Leavenworth, Washington	71017	100	−55.46 m (−182 ft)	D	47°36′59.4″N 120°40′42.3″W	LMS
K217GA	91.3 FM	Clarkston, Washington	71026	65	302.71 m (993 ft)	D	46°27′25.5″N 117°6′3.5″W	LMS
K227BW	93.3 FM	Pullman, Washington	71040	500	276.93 m (909 ft)	D	46°40′53.6″N 116°58′16.6″W	LMS
K248CN	97.5 FM	Ariel, Washington	142354	155	271.18 m (890 ft)	D	46°9′49.3″N 122°51′13.4″W	LMS
K259CY	99.7 FM	Bellingham, Washington	138079	34	113.66 m (373 ft)	D	48°48′3.4″N 122°27′44.6″W	LMS
K284BL	104.7 FM	Bellingham, Washington	138227	120	278.51 m (914 ft)	D	48°46′56.4″N 122°22′9.6″W	LMS

=== NPR and Classical Music ===
Call sign	Frequency	City of license	Facility ID	ERP; (W)	HAAT	Class	Transmitter coordinates	FCC info
KFAE-FM	89.1 FM	Richland, WA	71022	100,000	335.62 m (1,101 ft)	C	46°5′42.5″N 119°11′45.0″W	LMS
KHNW	88.3 FM	Manson, WA	172300	340	180.88 m (593 ft)	A	47°51′15.4″N 120°10′3.2″W	LMS
KNWO	90.1 FM	Cottonwood, ID	71018	250	599.82 m (1,968 ft)	C3	46°4′8.5″N 116°27′57.5″W	LMS
KNWP	90.1 FM	Port Angeles, WA	81161	1,600	210.46 m (690 ft)	A	48°9′2.3″N 123°40′13.7″W	LMS
KNWR	90.7 FM	Ellensburg, WA	71028	5,000	780.98 m (2,562 ft)	C1	47°15′47.4″N 120°23′35.2″W	LMS
KNWU	91.5 FM	Forks, WA	172905	170	8.7 m (29 ft)	A	47°55′59.2″N 124°23′45.7″W	LMS
KNWV	90.5 FM	Clarkston, WA	71042	350	334.72 m (1,098 ft)	A	46°27′25.5″N 117°6′3.5″W	LMS
KNWY	90.3 FM	Yakima, WA	71031	1,900	258.36 m (848 ft)	C3	46°31′56.5″N 120°30′46.2″W	LMS
KRFA-FM	91.7 FM (HD)	Moscow, ID	71016	28,000	−840.07 m (−2,756 ft)	C1	46°40′53.6″N 116°58′16.6″W	LMS
KVTI	90.9 FM	Tacoma, WA	12068	51,000	109.33 m (359 ft)	C1	47°9′38.0″N 122°34′39.0″W	LMS
KZAZ	91.7 FM (HD)	Bellingham, WA	49599	120	97.5 m (320 ft)	A	48°48′3.3″N 122°27′44.6″W	LMS

Broadcast translators for NPR and Classical Music
Call sign	Frequency	City of license	FID	ERP (W)	HAAT	Class	Transmitter coordinates	FCC info
K213DU	90.5 FM	Goldendale, WA–; The Dalles, OR	71021	155	501.01 m (1,644 ft)	D	45°42′24.4″N 121°5′32.2″W	LMS
K226AK	93.1 FM	Ephrata, Washington	71027	41	153.14 m (502 ft)	D	47°18′49.5″N 119°34′59.1″W	LMS
K265DX	100.9 FM	Enterprise, Oregon	138497	10	560.18 m (1,838 ft)	D	45°23′57.5″N 117°23′19.6″W	LMS
K272DO	102.3 FM	Orofino, Idaho	71029	37	219.72 m (721 ft)	D	46°30′28.6″N 116°13′10.5″W	LMS
K274BK	102.7 FM	Kamiah, Idaho	71034	19	191.88 m (630 ft)	D	46°10′16.6″N 116°2′18.5″W	LMS

KFAE-FM also broadcast the Washington Talking Book and Braille Library's Evergreen Radio Reading Service to blind and handicapped listeners on its 67kHz subcarrier until the service's closure on August 15, 2014. KFAE-FM was one of three major FM stations in Washington to do so; KPBX-FM in Spokane and KUOW-FM in Seattle were the others. However, this required a special FM radio capable of receiving such broadcasts; it could not be received on a standard FM radio.

=== Jazz ===
KJEM (89.9 FM), is NWPB's flagship jazz service. It broadcasts jazz music 24 hours a day to the Pullman and Moscow area and named for J. Elroy McCaw. Unlike the rest of the network, KJEM is largely student-run. In 2022, NWPB acquired KOHO-FM and began broadcasting NWPB's jazz programing to the Wenatchee Valley area.

Call sign	Frequency	City of license	Facility ID	ERP; (W)	HAAT	Class	Transmitter coordinates	FCC info
KJEM	89.9 FM	Pullman, WA	171613	2,300	167.14 m (548 ft)	A	46°41′46.6″N 117°14′47.6″W	LMS
KOHO-FM	101.1 FM	Leavenworth, WA	47072	930	645.36 m (2,117 ft)	C2	47°36′6.4″N 120°30′36.3″W	LMS

== See also ==
- KTNW, an associated television station in Richland
