= KPBG =

KPBG may refer to:

- KPBG (FM), a radio station (90.9 FM) licensed to serve Oroville, Washington, United States
- Plattsburgh International Airport (ICAO code KPBG)
