= KSFC =

- Spokane, Washington; United States
- Broadcast area: Spokane metropolitan area
- Frequency: 91.9 MHz (HD Radio)
- Branding: SPR Classical

Programming
- Format: Classical music
- Subchannels: HD2: KPBX-FM simulcast HD3: KPBZ simulcast

Ownership
- Owner: Spokane Public Radio, Inc.
- Sister stations: KPBX-FM, KPBZ

History
- First air date: January 14, 1973
- Call sign meaning: Spokane Falls Community College (previous owners)

Technical information
- Licensing authority: FCC
- Facility ID: 61933
- Class: C3
- ERP: 2,200 watts
- HAAT: 334.8 meters (1,098 ft)
- Transmitter coordinates: 47.813°N 117.507°W
- Translator: 100.3 K262CR (Coeur d'Alene, Idaho)
- Repeaters: 91.1 KPBX-HD2 (Spokane); 92.1 KXJO (St. Maries, Idaho)

Links
- Public license information: Public file; LMS
- Webcast: Listen live
- Website: spokanepublicradio.org

KSFC (91.9 FM) in Spokane, Washington, is one of the three non-profit radio stations run by the Spokane Public Radio organization, along with 91.1 KPBX-FM and 90.3 KPBZ. KSFC broadcasts with an effective radiated power (ERP) of 2,200 watts. It also has an FM translator in Coeur d'Alene, K262CR at 100.3 MHz, and a full-powered FM repeater in Saint Maries, KXJO at 92.1 MHz.

KSFC has a format of classical music programming.

== History ==
On January 15, 1973, the station first signed on the air. It was under the supervision of Richi Caldwell as a part of the new radio broadcasting teaching program at the Spokane Falls Community College. The original power was only ten watts.

In 1995, Spokane Falls Community College eliminated its teaching program in radio broadcasting as a cost-cutting move. At this point, KPBX-FM stepped in and bought the station, using it as a full-power translator to serve areas of Spokane where the main signal for KPBX-FM was weak.

On July 1, 1999, KSFC broke off from KPBX to air an expanded format of news and talk programming, including several NPR shows that had previously not been available in the Spokane area.

On August 4, 2025, KSFC changed their format to classical music, branded as "SPR Classical". The NPR news and information programming moved to KPBX-FM.
