= KRFA-FM =

Northwest Public Broadcasting station in Moscow, Idaho

Coordinates: 46.682°N 116.971°W

- Moscow, Idaho; United States
- Frequency: 91.7 MHz (HD Radio)

Programming
- Format: Public radio; News/Talk, Classical Music
- Subchannels: HD2: KWSU simulcast; HD3: Same as HD1; HD4: KJEM simulcast
- Affiliations: National Public Radio; American Public Media; Public Radio International

Ownership
- Owner: Washington State University
- Sister stations: KWSU, KJEM-FM, KWSU-TV

History
- First air date: December 13, 1963
- Former call signs: KUID-FM (1963–1984)
- Call sign meaning: Radio Fine Arts

Technical information
- Licensing authority: FCC
- Facility ID: 71016
- Class: C1
- ERP: 28,000 watts
- HAAT: 282 meters (925 ft)

Links
- Public license information: Public file; LMS
- Webcast: Listen live
- Website: nwpb.org

KRFA-FM (91.7 FM) is a radio station licensed to Moscow, Idaho. The station is owned by Washington State University, and is the flagship station of Northwest Public Broadcasting's "NPR and Classical Music" service.

The station debuted on December 13, 1963, as KUID-FM, operated by the University of Idaho as a service of the UI Department of Communications. It was Idaho's first educational radio station. Due to a funding crisis, UI transferred control of the station to WSU in 1984 under its current call letters. The acquisition of KRFA allowed NWPB to split its offerings into a two-channel network, with KRFA taking most of flagship KWSU's classical music programming.

NWPB operates KUID's old studio on the UI campus as a satellite studio.
