= KJEM =

Radio station in Pullman, Washington

Coordinates: 46.696°N 117.2455°W

- Pullman, Washington; United States
- Frequency: 89.9 MHz

Programming
- Format: Jazz

Ownership
- Owner: Washington State University
- Sister stations: KRFA-FM, KWSU, KWSU-TV

History
- First air date: November 1, 2013
- Call sign meaning: J. Elroy McCaw, 1934 alumnus of Washington State and father of donor to station

Technical information
- Licensing authority: FCC
- Facility ID: 171613
- Class: A
- ERP: 2,300 watts
- HAAT: 164 meters (538 ft)
- Repeater: KOHO-FM 101.1 Leavenworth, Washington

Links
- Public license information: Public file; LMS
- Website: kjemjazz.org

KJEM (89.9 FM) is a radio station licensed to Pullman, Washington. The station is owned by Washington State University, and airs Northwest Public Broadcasting's first 24-hour Jazz service. While supervised by Northwest Public Broadcasting staff, the station will be run primarily by students.

== Call letters ==
The station call letters acknowledge J. Elroy McCaw, a WSU broadcasting alumnus. McCaw's son Bruce made a donation to Washington State University to fund the new station. J. Elroy McCaw is the father of Craig McCaw, founder of McCaw Cellular (a forerunner of AT&T Mobility).
