= Clover Park Technical College =

Public college in Lakewood, Washington, US

Coordinates: 47.175°N 122.497°W

- Type: Public community college
- Established: 1941
- Academic affiliations: Northwest Commission on Colleges and Universities
- President: Joyce Loveday
- Location: Washington, United States
- Campus: Urban
- Website: www.cptc.edu

Clover Park Technical College (CPTC) is a public community college with its main campus in Lakewood, Washington, United States. It also has two other campuses, an aviation-focused South Hill Campus near Puyallup adjacent to Thun Field and the Eastside Training Center in Tacoma.

== History ==
Clover Park Technical College traces its origins to 1941, when the Clover Park School District launched a War Production Training program in the shop buildings at Clover Park High School. The program trained local residents in auto mechanics, aircraft‑service mechanics, ship‑fitting, welding, and blueprint reading to support World War II military needs. More than 500 students completed training in auto and aircraft mechanics, and in 1942 the district formally established Clover Park Vocational‑Technical Institute to train 3,500 civilians for work at McChord Field, Fort Lewis, and Tacoma shipyards.

After the war, training expanded to include aircraft mechanics and Civil Aeronautics Administration certification. In 1954 the institute moved from the Navy Supply Depot to its current Lakewood location, gradually occupying vacant warehouses as facilities grew. The school added 16 new programs in the late 1960s—its largest single‑year expansion—and by 1970 employed 90 full‑time instructors. A small grant in 1957 funded the institute's first resource center, supporting its growing academic offerings.

Originally operated by the Clover Park School District, the institute transitioned to state oversight in the early 1990s. In 1991, following passage of Washington's workforce training legislation, the school became Clover Park Technical College, joining the state's system of community and technical colleges. CPTC is now one of 34 public community and technical colleges in Washington.

The school is the home of KVTI 90.9 FM, a 50,000‑watt radio station licensed to Clover Park Technical College and operated through a partnership with Northwest Public Broadcasting.

The CPTC campus was the site of Tacoma Speedway prior to World War II.

== Academics ==
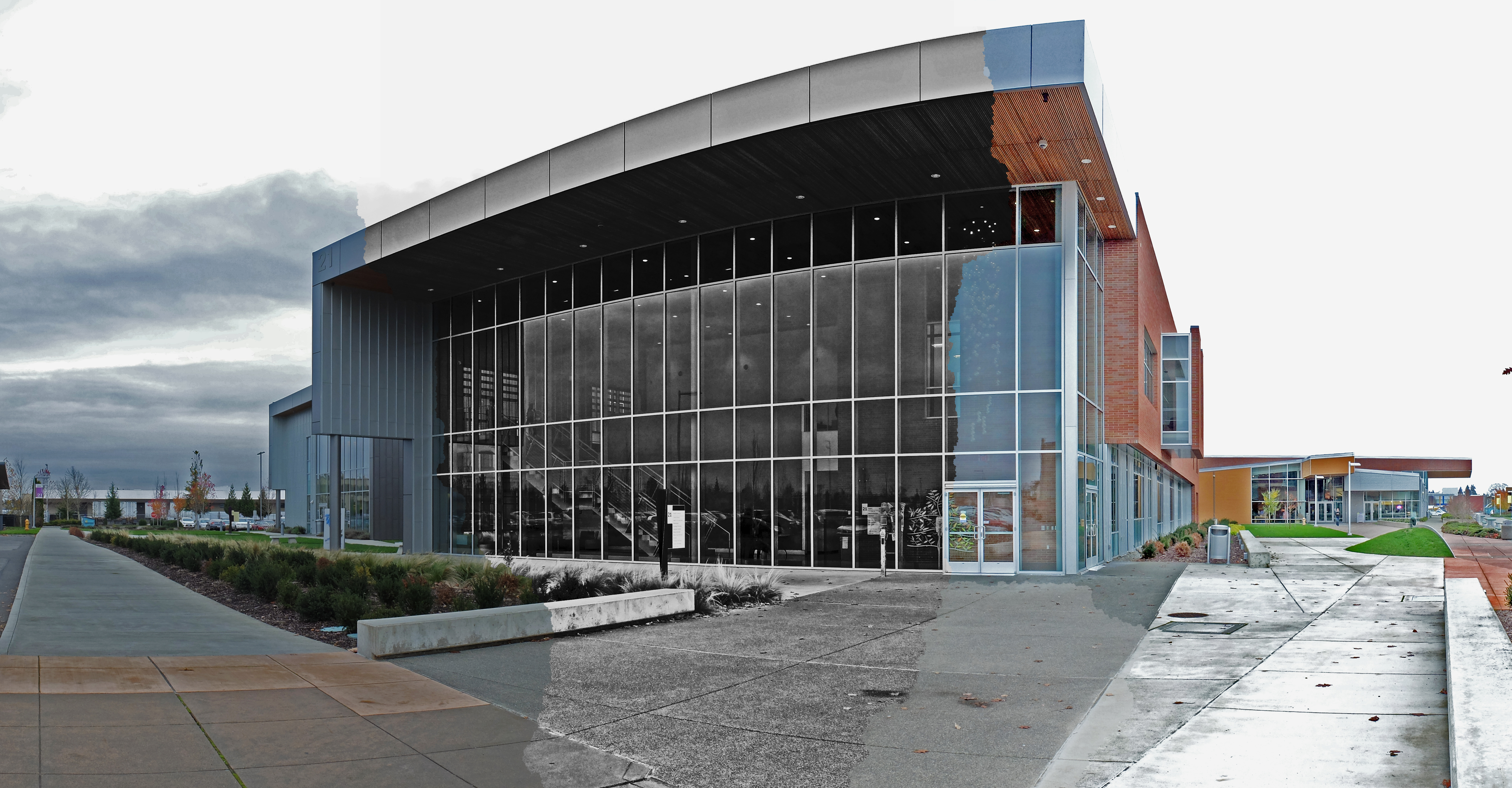
CPTC Health Sciences building

The main CPTC campus has an enrollment of 3,609 full-time and 3,207 part-time students. CPTC offers the Bachelor of Applied Science, the Associate of Applied Technology (AAT), and certificates. In fall 2014, the college launched its first applied baccalaureate program with its Bachelor of Applied Science in Manufacturing Operations. In January 2025, the college expanded to three campuses, opening the Eastside Training Center in Tacoma.

Since 2002, the college has undergone an extensive construction program to convert what was once a World War II navy supply base into a modern, pedestrian-oriented campus. The college employs 431 full- and part-time faculty, exempt and classified salaried employees.

CPTC also manages the Northwest Career & Technical High School (NWC&THS). NWC&THS allows high school students to complete their diploma while simultaneously taking classes in their career program. In fall 2003, NWCTHS opened with 21 students. In 2005 it had 16 graduates. NWC&THS currently has around 200 students.

== Foundation ==
The Clover Park Technical College Foundation is a 501(c)(3) nonprofit organization dedicated to supporting Clover Park Technical College students, faculty, and programs. Its mission is to expand educational opportunities and strengthen the region's future workforce by providing scholarships, emergency assistance, and resources that help students stay in school and succeed. Because only about 60% of the college's operating budget comes from state funding, the Foundation plays an essential role in generating private support to help close the financial gap.

The foundation is governed by a volunteer board of local business and community leaders, with guidance from an executive director and support from ex-officio college staff. It has earned the GuideStar Bronze Seal of Transparency for its commitment to accountability.
