= J. Elroy McCaw =

American entrepreneur and broadcaster (1911–1969)

- McCaw in 1956
- Born: John Elroy McCaw; September 15, 1911; Colfax, Washington, U.S.
- Died: August 17, 1969 (aged 57); The Highlands, Seattle, Washington, U.S.
- Occupations: Businessman, broadcaster
- Spouse: Marion Mary Oliver (m. 1941)
- Children: 4, including Bruce, Craig and John Jr.

John Elroy McCaw (September 15, 1911 – August 17, 1969) was an American businessman whose most visible holdings were in the broadcasting industry. McCaw owned several major-market radio and television stations in the United States, with his holdings primarily being concentrated in Washington state. He is also perhaps best known as the owner of WINS in New York City, which during his stewardship became the first radio station in the region to adopt a Top 40/rock and roll format in 1957.

== Early life ==
McCaw was born on September 15, 1911, to John M. and Freda McCaw in Colfax in Whitman County, in eastern Washington.

While a student at Weatherwax High School in Aberdeen, he created a private telephone system that at one point connected the McCaw home, the high school, and downtown businesses; he broadcast recorded music and fed local radio station KXRO programs over his private lines, some of which were run in sewer pipes and alleys. After graduating high school, he spent a year working for Western Electric, installing switchboard equipment. He graduated from Washington State College, now Washington State University in 1934; he was the student manager of campus radio station KWSC there while studying radio engineering and business administration.

McCaw served in the United States Army Air Force in World War II, being called into service as a second lieutenant in 1942. He served as assistant executive officer to Brigadier General Hap Arnold and later in Air Force communications under Harold M. McClelland.

== Career ==
McCaw entered the world of broadcasting as a founding owner of KELA in Chehalis and Centralia in 1937, after abandoning a plan to start a regional radio network similar to New England's Yankee Network. After World War II, during which he served in the United States Army, McCaw began to expand his broadcasting interests. In 1946, McCaw and other partners were authorized to start KPOA (630 AM) in Honolulu, Hawaiʻi. In 1950, McCaw purchased Seattle station KRSC (1150 AM) from the Radio Sales Corporation for $112,500. It was sold to Washington Telecasters in 1953. Also in 1950, McCaw acquired KYA in San Francisco, from Dorothy Schiff, in partnership with John D. Keating, with whom he owned KPOA.

When the Federal Communications Commission set a seven-station ownership limit in radio and stipulated that it applied to minority ownership in 1953, McCaw and CBS were the only two groups that were over the limit. McCaw owned eight stations at that time: KPOA in Honolulu (renamed KONA), KILA in Hilo, Hawaiʻi; KYA in San Francisco; KELA in Centralia; and KORC in Mineral Wells, Texas. He also held minority stakes in KALE in Richland, Washington; KYAK in Yakima, Washington; and KLZ in Denver, the last three with minority stakes. As a result, McCaw disposed of his interest in the Hilo station in 1954, and he also divested KPOA and KORC as part of moves to acquire New York station WINS from Crosley Broadcasting. During McCaw's ownership of WINS, the station instituted a disc jockey-driven format led by Alan Freed, bringing "rock and roll" music to New York. By 1957, WINS had become a full-time Top 40 outlet. KYA was sold in 1958 to Bartell Broadcasters. Several stations had been owned by a partnership between McCaw, John D. Keating and movie theater operator Charles Skouras; this relationship ended in 1959, with McCaw becoming the full owner of WINS while Keating took over KONA television in Honolulu and KDAY in Santa Monica, California.

After being part of the consortium (McCaw, Keating, and the Honolulu Advertiser) that purchased struggling Honolulu television station KONA in 1953, in 1954, McCaw expanded his holdings with the purchase of KMO-TV (channel 13) in Tacoma, which became KTVW. The next year, Gotham Broadcasting Corporation purchased KFEL, channel 2 in Denver, which became KTVR and then KCTO in 1959. McCaw ventured into professional hockey when he became the sole owner of the Seattle Americans in 1957, when KTVW's general manager—who also held the same post with the team—resigned. During this time, KTVW also broadcast the games of the minor-league Seattle Rainiers, and McCaw was a booster for a possible National League baseball team in Seattle. McCaw reached an agreement to sell the team in January 1958; this fell through, and having lost a "considerable" sum, the Western Hockey League acquired the franchise that May for the value of its players and equipment.

McCaw was considered a miserly operator in his broadcasting properties. When he acquired WINS, which was losing money, he aggressively cut costs. He locked out the studio orchestra, ordered the use of 60-watt light bulbs, and opted for the use of cheaper paper on the teletype machine. The station's studios were moved to Columbus Circle on the upper floor of the American Circle Building, which had been built for William Randolph Hearst but suffered from neglect. Then-employee Rick Sklar commented, "If, through natural selection, a new humanoid species were to evolve that could instinctively survive without any money of its own, Elroy McCaw would have been the progenitor." Of KCTO in Denver, Broadcasting magazine wrote that "McCaw's saving ways had been reflected in the station's programming". KTVW in Seattle did not convert to color telecasting until after McCaw's death and a change in ownership. Similarly, multiple women told of McCaw feigning losing his wallet to make them pay for meals at restaurants.

McCaw's frugality proved beneficial when the New York Yankees left WINS after the 1957 season. Sports director Les Keiter began staging play-by-play recreations of San Francisco Giants games (as the team had recently relocated there from New York) via telegraphy; the games proved a ratings success, while Keiter's announcing skills were so highly regarded that audiences were not able to discern the difference. McCaw also had Bell System phone equipment modified with radio microphones for New York Knickerbockers away games, which—when plugged into normal phone lines—produced a similar fidelity to high-quality transmission lines. After Bell System officials sabotaged one Knicks broadcast live on-air by having switchboard operators repeatedly intrude on the phone line the station used, McCaw took the Bell System to court and prevailed.

In 1960, McCaw attempted to sell WINS to Storer Broadcasting for $10 million, which would have been the most expensive radio sale in history. McCaw was motivated to sell the station, distant from his other holdings, because of its isolation from his Seattle home and the losses incurred in running the Seattle and Denver independent stations. The deal failed to close because of a payola investigation that held up the renewal of WINS's license; Storer instead acquired station WMGM, while McCaw sold WINS to Westinghouse Broadcasting in 1962 for the same price. The next year, a company in which McCaw was the largest stakeholder purchased KIXI (880 AM) in Seattle.

McCaw disposed of a number of his broadcasting holdings in 1965 and 1966. KELA in Centralia was sold to its general manager, and KCTO was sold to the owners of WGN-TV in Chicago. Meanwhile, McCaw was busy investing in and selling off real estate. McCaw continued to own the building from which WINS broadcast, after selling the station; the property was sold in 1965 for the development of the Gulf and Western Building. McCaw was the chief investor in a consortium that purchased Town & Country Village, a shopping center in Sacramento, California, in 1966.

== Personal life, death, and legacy ==
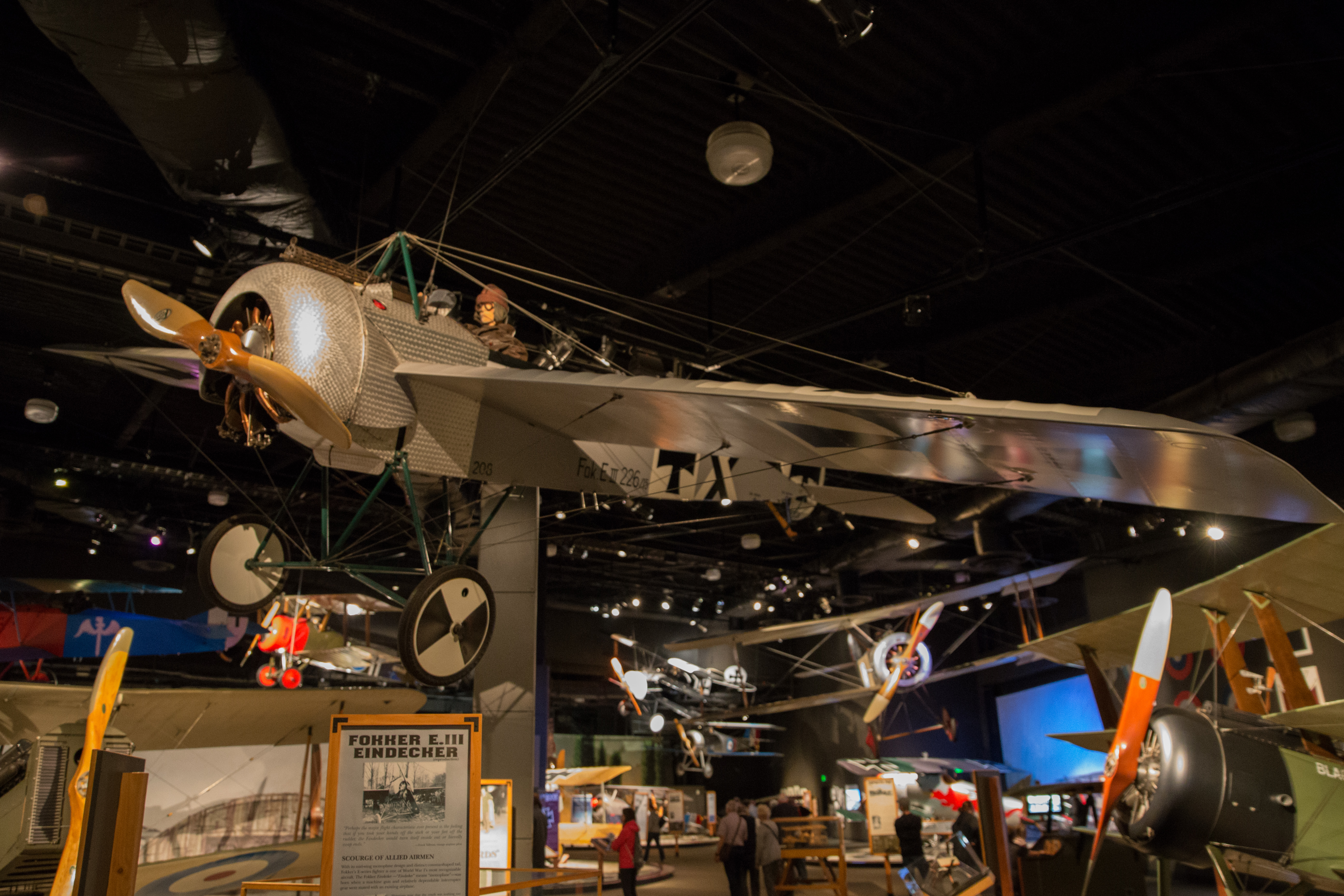
The J. Elroy McCaw Personal Courage Wing at Seattle's Museum of Flight

In 1941, McCaw married Marion Mary Oliver, a member of a prominent family in Centralia. They had four sons: Bruce, Craig, Keith, and John E. Jr. McCaw served on several civic and charitable organizations, including with the Century 21 Exposition, Phi Sigma Kappa, and the Seattle Opera Association, as well as several athletic clubs. Marion entered broadcast ownership in her own right in 1947 by signing on KAPA, a daytime-only radio station in Raymond, Washington; Marion sold off KAPA in 1956.

McCaw maintained many of his contacts from his days in the Army and remained in the Air Force Reserve. In 1961, he served on a citizens' advisory group. The meeting was canceled due to the Berlin Crisis of 1961, but McCaw showed up anyway. As a result of a miscommunication, he inadvertently was escorted to a meeting of the National Security Council at the White House. McCaw was sworn to total secrecy; the incident was dramatized by press secretary Pierre Salinger in the 1971 novel On Instructions of My Government.

McCaw died in his sleep on August 17, 1969, at his home—the historic William E. Boeing House—in The Highlands area of Seattle. He left his children to manage a heavily indebted estate that had just been described by J. Michael Kenyon, television columnist of the Seattle Post-Intelligencer, as "owning almost as many things as organized religion". Creditors made more than $12 million (equivalent to $74.6 million in 2025 dollars) in claims, after which the bank declared his estate insolvent, requiring the family to sell off his various holdings, including the family mansion and yachts. The KIXI radio stations, of which McCaw owned 45 percent, were sold per a probate court order in 1971. KTVW was sold by the estate the next year. Marion's 2012 obituary noted J. Elroy's penchant for having made "handshake deals" throughout his career.

The only asset that was not sold off was Twin City Cablevision, the cable system in Centralia. One of J. Elroy's sons, Craig McCaw, became the general manager of that cable system, which the family kept; Craig grew the company into McCaw Cellular Communications, a pioneer in the wireless telephone industry in the United States which merged into AT&T in 1994. Financial analyst Bruce Wasserstein has regarded the elder McCaw as "a freewheeling entrepreneur"—despite very poor record-keeping—but who had the foresight to put the cable system into a trust with the children in mind.

A wing of the Museum of Flight in Seattle, the J. Elroy McCaw Personal Courage Wing, was dedicated in McCaw's honor in 2004. In 2013, Craig McCaw donated in his father's name to the Edward R. Murrow College of Communication at Washington State, leading to the establishment of KJEM, a jazz music station bearing his initials, on November 1, 2013.

== Bibliography ==
Sklar, Rick (1984). Rocking America: an insider's story: how the all-hit radio stations took over (1st ed.). New York: St. Martin's Press. ISBN 0-312-68797-4. OCLC 10277877.
