= KZAZ (FM) =

Northwest Public Radio station in Bellingham, Washington

- Bellingham, Washington; United States
- Frequency: 91.7 MHz

Programming
- Format: Public radio; Classical and news/talk
- Network: Northwest Public Broadcasting Classical
- Affiliations: NPR; APM; PRX

Ownership
- Owner: Washington State University
- Sister stations: KMWS

History
- First air date: 1991

Technical information
- Licensing authority: FCC
- Facility ID: 49599
- Class: A
- ERP: 120 watts
- HAAT: 102 meters (335 ft)
- Transmitter coordinates: 48.8009°N 122.4624°W

Links
- Public license information: Public file; LMS
- Webcast: Listen live
- Website: www.nwpb.org

KZAZ (91.7 FM) is a non-commercial radio station licensed to Bellingham, Washington, United States. The station is owned by Washington State University and is part of the Northwest Public Broadcasting's classical music network, also featuring some NPR news programs.

== History ==
KZAZ signed on in 1991 as an independent public radio station serving Bellingham, owned by Northern Sound Public Radio. KZAZ's launch had been delayed nearly 18 months in going on the air from its planned May 1990 launch; it faced a series of issues, one of which was the incorrect placement of its antenna on the tower.

Additionally, the new station was seeking federal grant money at the same time as more visible community organizations, such as the local United Way. Broadcasting then as now with just 120 watts to protect allocations to Canada, KZAZ maintained NPR and American Public Radio affiliations. Washington State University merged with Northern Sound Public Radio, structured as a transaction in which WSU bought KZAZ for $60,000, in 1997.

In August 1996, KZAZ had applied to build a new FM station in Mount Vernon, also at 91.7 FM, to expand its coverage area. This application would prove particularly useful for Washington State University. Also in Mount Vernon was Skagit Valley College's KSVR, then at 90.1 FM and causing co-channel interference to KNWP, the Northwest Public Radio transmitter at Port Angeles. In May 2000, Northern Sound offered to transfer the 91.7 construction permit to Skagit Valley College to move KSVR there and solve the interference problem. The original KSVR license was then transferred to Washington State and relaunched as NWPR transmitter KMWS in November 2002, at which time the KSVR intellectual unit moved to 91.7.
