= KOHO-FM =

Simulcast of KJEM Pullman
- Leavenworth, Washington; United States
- Broadcast area: Wenatchee, Washington
- Frequency: 101.1 MHz

Programming
- Format: Jazz

Ownership
- Owner: Icicle Broadcasting, Inc. (pending transfer to Sleepy Lady Foundation)
- Operator: Washington State University
- Sister stations: KNWR (FM), KLWS

History
- First air date: 1998 (as KLVH) (as KLVH)
- Former call signs: KLVH (1994–1999)
- Call sign meaning: derived from coho salmon, a native northwest fish

Technical information
- Licensing authority: FCC
- Facility ID: 47072
- Class: C2
- ERP: 930 watts
- HAAT: 623 meters (2,044 ft)
- Transmitter coordinates: 47°36′7.00″N 120°30′32.00″W

Links
- Public license information: Public file; LMS
- Webcast: Listen live
- Website: kjemjazz.org

KOHO-FM (101.1 FM) is a radio station licensed to Leavenworth, Washington, United States, serving the Wenatchee area. The station is currently owned by Icicle Broadcasting, Inc., and airs Northwest Public Broadcasting's 24-hour Jazz service as a simulcast of KJEM in Pullman.

== History ==
The station was assigned the call sign KLVH on March 25, 1994; it signed on in 1998. Its call sign was changed to KOHO-FM on August 20, 1999; the new name was derived from coho salmon. The station was founded by the Icicle Broadcasting Corporation, owned by Harriet Bullitt, and primarily played adult alternative and jazz.

On April 8, 2022, it was announced that the station would flip to Northwest Public Broadcasting's jazz network, based at KJEM, on April 19. At midnight on April 19, KOHO-FM's stream went silent for several hours before beginning the simulcast with KJEM during the 9 am hour.

On December 21, 2023, the FCC license for KOHO was transferred to Northwest Public Broadcasting following a donation from the Sleeping Lady Foundation.
