= KPBZ =

- Spokane, Washington; United States
- Broadcast area: Spokane metropolitan area
- Frequency: 90.3 MHz (HD Radio)
- Branding: SPR Jazz

Programming
- Format: Jazz

Ownership
- Owner: Spokane Public Radio, Inc.
- Sister stations: KPBX-FM, KSFC

History
- First air date: September 2010

Technical information
- Licensing authority: FCC
- Facility ID: 90126
- Class: A
- ERP: 550 watts
- HAAT: 329.7 meters (1,082 ft)
- Transmitter coordinates: 47°48′48″N 117°30′23″W
- Repeaters: 91.1 KPBX-HD3 (Spokane); 91.9 KSFC-HD3 (Spokane)

Links
- Public license information: Public file; LMS
- Webcast: Listen live
- Website: spokanepublicradio.org

KPBZ (90.3 FM) is a radio station licensed to Spokane, Washington, United States. The station is one of three owned by Spokane Public Radio, the others being KPBX and KSFC. Programming consists entirely of jazz music.

On August 4, 2025, KPBZ changed their format from PRX Remix to jazz, branded as "SPR Jazz".
