= KPBX-FM =

Radio station in Washington, United States

- Spokane, Washington; United States
- Broadcast area: Inland Empire
- Frequency: 91.1 MHz (HD Radio)
- Branding: SPR News

Programming
- Format: Public radio - News/Talk
- Subchannels: HD2: KSFC simulcast HD3: KPBZ simulcast
- Affiliations: National Public Radio; BBC World Service

Ownership
- Owner: Spokane Public Radio, Inc.
- Sister stations: KSFC, KPBZ

History
- First air date: January 20, 1980; Originally experimental c. 1971-1977
- Call sign meaning: Public Broadcasting

Technical information
- Licensing authority: FCC
- Facility ID: 61942
- Class: C
- ERP: 56,000 watts
- HAAT: 725 meters (2,379 ft)
- Transmitter coordinates: 47°34′13″N 117°05′0″W
- Translator: See § Translators
- Repeater: See § Repeaters

Links
- Public license information: Public file; LMS
- Webcast: Listen live
- Website: spokanepublicradio.org

KPBX-FM (91.1 FM) is a non-commercial, listener-supported, public radio station in Spokane, Washington. It airs news, talk and information programs on weekday morning and afternoon drive times, with a mix of music shows featuring classical, jazz, blues, folk and other genres the rest of the day, and the BBC World Service overnight. KPBX-FM, along with sister stations 91.9 KSFC and 90.3 KPBZ, are owned and operated by Spokane Public Radio.

KPBX-FM is a Class C station. It broadcasts with an effective radiated power (ERP) of 56,000 watts. Its transmitter tower is off East Henry Road in Spokane Valley. Through seven full-power repeaters and six translators, it reaches listeners in eastern Washington, northeastern Oregon, northern Idaho, western Montana and southern British Columbia.

== History ==
=== Early years ===
The station traces its history to a ten-watt transmitter. It was erected in the early 1970s at the home of George Cole in the South Hill neighborhood of Spokane. It broadcast various kinds of music eight hours a day from 5 p.m. to 1 a.m. In 1974, David Schoengold, a record store owner and law school student, took over the station from Cole and expanded its broadcast schedule to 24 hours a day. It became very popular, with people waiting at all hours of the day to go on the air. It also gained the attention of National Public Radio, since Spokane had no NPR network affiliate. NPR sent tapes of All Things Considered to the station, hoping the program might be carried. The nearest NPR station in the area was KWSU in Pullman, which was difficult for Spokane listeners to pick up.

Schoengold wanted a better station for the area, so he formed the Spokane Public Broadcasting Association to raise funding for a full-power public radio station. The 10-watt transmitter went off the air at the suggestion of one of Schoengold's friends in order to make it easier to raise the money. Getting the required funding took longer than expected, in part because the board was committed to keeping the proposed station as a community license. While linking up with a local nonprofit or an educational institution would have provided greater security, many board members believed that it would have also compromised the station's ability to program potentially controversial content.

On August 4, 2025 KPBX-FM rebranded as "SPR News" with news and talk programming.

=== Fundraising ===
It took several years of fundraising (with a final goal larger than that of a typical year's fundraising at area public television station KSPS-TV). There were also several delays in the starting date. KPBX finally signed on the air on January 20, 1980. The station was actually ready to debut in 1979, having hired a general manager/program director and 13 staffers. However, FCC concerns forced a year's delay.

KPBX-FM had to postpone its first pledge drive due to an unforeseen event. It was scheduled for May 18, 1980. That was the date Mount St. Helens erupted, and Pacific Northwest Bell requested that phone lines be used for emergencies only. It is one of seven local Spokane FM radio stations heard across Canada to subscribers of the Shaw Direct satellite TV service.

=== Specialty shows ===
The station broadcasts a mix of NPR news and entertainment, classical music, jazz and other musical genres. KPBX also carries BirdNote Daily, a two-minute show about birds and nature, produced in Washington State.

KPBX had broadcast the Washington Talking Book & Braille Library's Evergreen Radio Reading Service to blind and handicapped listeners on its 67kHz subcarrier. With other reading services available on the internet, the KPBX service was shut down on August 15, 2014. KPBX was one of three major FM stations in Washington to do so; KUOW-FM in Seattle and KFAE-FM in Richland were the others. This service required a special FM radio capable of receiving such broadcasts. It could not be received on a standard FM radio.

The station's studios are located at 1229 North Monroe Street. KPBX-FM renovated a former fire station to relocate the offices in 2015.

== Repeaters ==
Call sign	Frequency	City of license	Facility ID	ERP W	Height m (ft)	Class	Transmitter coordinates
KIBX	92.1 FM (HD)	Bonners Ferry, Idaho	77383	74	838 m (2,749 ft)	A	48°36′37″N 116°15′24″W
KLGG	89.3 FM	Kellogg, Idaho	172927	100	782 m (2,566 ft)	C3	47°29′32″N 116°08′33″W
KOMQ	88.5 FM	Omak, Washington	173719	100	777.1 m (2,550 ft)	C3	48°27′15″N 119°18′30″W
KPBG	90.9 FM	Oroville, Washington	173880	1,000	4.7 m (15 ft)	A	48°46′59.1″N 119°22′56.1″W
KPBW	91.9 FM (HD)	Brewster, Washington	173803	1,000	755.2 m (2,478 ft)	C2	48°02′14″N 119°59′7″W
KTWP	91.1 FM	Twisp, Washington	173815	110	511 m (1,677 ft)	A	48°19′3″N 120°06′53″W

== Translators ==
Broadcast translators for KPBX-FM
Call sign	Frequency	City of license	FID	ERP (W)	HAAT	Class	FCC info
K214AR	90.7 FM	Spokane, Washington	61936	48	28 m (92 ft)	D	LMS
K220CQ	91.9 FM	Brewster, Washington	61941	46	630 m (2,067 ft)	D	LMS
K220CR	91.7 FM	Oroville, Washington, etc.	61937	11	120 m (394 ft)	D	LMS
K220DV	91.9 FM	Grand Coulee, Washington	35458	46	−2 m (−7 ft)	D	LMS
