= Bruce McCaw =

American businessman

- Born: 1946 or 1947 (age 79–80)
- Occupation: Businessman
- Spouse: Jolene McCaw
- Children: 3
- Father: J. Elroy McCaw
- Relatives: Craig McCaw and John McCaw Jr. (brothers)

Bruce McCaw (born 1946 or 1947) is an American businessman.

He is the son of J. Elroy McCaw, and elder brother of Craig McCaw, founder of McCaw Cellular (now part of AT&T Mobility) and Clearwire Corporation.

He was educated at Lakeside School, a private school in the Seattle area.

Bruce co-founded Westar Insurance in Bellevue, specializing in aviation insurance areas, and merged to become Forbes Westar Inc, and co-founded Horizon Airlines.

In 2005, his estimated net worth was US$925 million.

He is married to Jolene, and they have three children. They live in Hunts Point, Washington, in the Seattle area, since 2008. Their Hunts Point mansion was listed for $58 million in September 2024, reduced from $85 million.

McCaw previously owned a 7,500-square-foot home near Bellevue Marina for 15 years, and sold it in 2004.

He won Best of Show at the 2025 Las Vegas Concours d'Elegance with a 1929 Mercedes-Benz Barker Tourer.
