= KTNW =

PBS member station in Richland, Washington

- Richland–Pasco–Kennewick, Washington; United States
- City: Richland, Washington
- Channels: Digital: 22 (UHF); Virtual: 31
- Branding: Northwest Public Broadcasting

Programming
- Affiliations: 31.1: PBS; 31.2: Create; 31.3: World

Ownership
- Owner: Washington State University
- Sister stations: KWWS, KFAE-FM

History
- First air date: October 18, 1987
- Former channel numbers: Analog: 31 (UHF, 1987–2009); Digital: 38 (UHF, 2003–2018)
- Call sign meaning: "Television Northwest"

Technical information
- Licensing authority: FCC
- Facility ID: 71023
- ERP: 55 kW; 35 kW (CP)
- HAAT: 369 m (1,211 ft)
- Transmitter coordinates: 46°6′12.8″N 119°7′44.6″W
- Translator(s): 33 (UHF) Pullman; K34QC-D Lewiston, ID

Links
- Public license information: Public file; LMS
- Website: www.nwpb.org

KTNW (channel 31) is a PBS member television station in Richland, Washington, United States, serving the Tri-Cities area. The station is owned by Washington State University (WSU) and is part of its Northwest Public Broadcasting group of radio and television services. KTNW's studios are located on the first floor of the West Building on the WSU Tri-Cities campus on Crimson Way in Richland, and its transmitter is located on Jump Off Joe Butte. Master control and most internal operations are based at the studios of former sister station KWSU-TV (channel 10) in the Murrow Communications Center on WSU's main campus in Pullman.

WSU has broadcast public television to the Tri-Cities since 1968, though it was not until 1987 that a full-power station was erected to serve the region.

The station serves the eastern portion of the Yakima–Tri-Cities market; the western portion is served by KYVE in Yakima, a satellite of KCTS-TV in Seattle. It is carried on the Yakima–Tri-Cities DirecTV and Dish Network feeds, and operates a translator on UHF channel 33 in Pullman.

== History ==
Except for local cable viewers, who received KCTS-TV from Seattle, the Tri-Cities area was unserved by educational television, though plans first emerged for a translator service in 1962. To fill the gap, in March 1966, WSU applied for a translator of KWSC-TV, its educational station in Pullman, to broadcast to the Tri-Cities area on channel 71. The next year, the university received a $48,000 grant to expand its service with five new translators, notably including one in Spokane and the Tri-Cities rebroadcaster. The translator was intended into go into service on November 30, 1968, rebroadcasting programs for the Tri-Cities on channel 76 and feeding repeaters at Ephrata and Walla Walla. However, it was found that the original plan of feeding the Jump Off Joe Butte rebroadcaster directly from another atop Steptoe Butte, 108 miles (174 km) away, was insufficient; though some people apparently were seeing programming, another relay at Lind was built to finally allow broadcast of KWSU-TV through the previously completed network in 1970. In 1982, WSU began providing public radio service to the area through KFAE-FM, now part of the Northwest Public Radio regional network.

In 1984, citing the comparatively low-power installation and resultant poor signal of the translator, WSU applied to build a full-service, high-power public TV station for the Tri-Cities area which would rebroadcast KWSU-TV by direct microwave link and also have studio facilities for the production of programs of local interest; station officials noted that the area had three commercial stations but no public TV of its own. The construction permit for KTNW was granted in January 1986, though the university dropped full studio plans in favor of relocating its mobile production unit from Pullman to Richland. The university provided $150,000, with local backers starting a campaign to raise another $200,000 to fund construction costs; WSU was twice unsuccessful in obtaining federal funding grants. KWSU hoped that the new market would also assist the Pullman station by providing a major increase in viewership; at the time, it could not afford to air some PBS programs or produce many local shows. Business offices were established in Kennewick.

After major grants totaling $75,000 from Battelle Northwest and Kaiser Engineers Hanford helped push the campaign to its goal, construction began that summer. Another 20 feet (6.1 m) was added to the 50 feet (15 m) mast on Jump Off Joe Butte used for the translator station, After nearly two decades of translator operation, KTNW went on the air on October 18, 1987. The station was run rather lean in its early years; in addition to the lack of studios beyond the mobile unit with its three cameras and video tape editing equipment, there was no full-time employee dedicated to KTNW for two years. Permanent studios became a reality in 1991 when a $12.7 million addition to the campus of WSU Tri-Cities, established the year before, included studios for radio and television.

KTNW has been digital-only since February 17, 2009. In 2018, the station was repacked from digital channel 38 to channel 22; the resultant technical work also improved coverage to Walla Walla and Hermiston, Oregon, which had not been in the previous coverage area.

== Local programming ==
While KTNW primarily broadcasts PBS national programs as well as some regional programs shared with KWSU-TV in Pullman, it also airs some specific local programs of interest for the Tri-Cities; the two stations maintain separate local station breaks. Among the local productions of note for the region is the Our Hanford History oral history series, which chronicles the impact of the Hanford Site on the area. Previous productions from KTNW have included monthly coverage of the meetings of the Columbia Basin Badger Club, a civic organization, as well as In Steppe, a monthly magazine program that spotlighted local people and groups.

== Subchannels ==
The station's signal is multiplexed:

Subchannels of KTNW
Subchannel	Res.	Short name	Programming
31.1	1080i	KTNW-HD	PBS
31.2	480i	KTNW-DT	Create
31.3	480i	KTNW-DT	World Channel

=== Translators ===
- KTNW (DRT) 33 Pullman
- K34QC-D 34 Lewiston, ID

== See also ==
- KWSU-TV
- Northwest Public Radio
