= KSER =

Public radio station in Everett, Washington

- Everett, Washington; United States
- Broadcast area: Snohomish County
- Frequency: 90.7 MHz
- Branding: 90.7 KSER

Programming
- Format: News; public affairs; talk

Ownership
- Owner: KSER Foundation

History
- First air date: February 9, 1991
- Call sign meaning: "Snohomish Everett Radio"

Technical information
- Licensing authority: FCC
- Facility ID: 29649
- Class: A
- ERP: 5,800 watts
- HAAT: 92 meters (302 ft)
- Transmitter coordinates: 48°01′27.4″N 122°6′45.5″W

Links
- Public license information: Public file; LMS
- Webcast: Listen live
- Website: www.kser.org

KSER (90.7 FM) is a non-commercial radio station licensed to Everett, Washington. The station is owned and operated by the non-profit KSER Foundation, and airs a mix of news/talk, music and public affairs.

== History ==
KSER's roots trace back to 1962, when KRAB signed on at 107.7 MHz. This Seattle radio station, later owned by the Jack Straw Memorial Foundation, provided an eclectic mix of jazz, world music, Pacifica radio features, and much more. The station was also dangerously close to insolvency. Its management realized the station could be sold to a commercial broadcaster and an endowment was created, allowing the foundation to broadcast in the non-commercial part of the radio dial, which exists between 88.1 MHz and 91.9 MHz. The owners of KRAB originally applied to share time with KNHC, owned by the Seattle Public Schools. However, this action was seen by the school district as a hostile take-over bid. Ultimately, the owners got a license for 90.7 MHz in Everett, Washington. The Seattle frequency was sold and became KMGI (now today's KNDD).

Six years later, on February 9, 1991, KSER signed on from its studios at a small retail space in Lynnwood, Washington. By 1994 the foundation sold the station to its current owners, the KSER Foundation. The station built a new transmitter in western Lake Stevens in 1997 that allowed them to increase power to 5,800 watts and improve coverage to most of Snohomish County. KSER relocated from its Lynnwood studios to a new space in Downtown Everett on February 25, 2004, after the acquisition and renovation of a former lawyer's office and dental laboratory. Although its signal also reaches King County, coverage is limited due to signal coverage from KVTI: Tacoma, which broadcasts adjacent at 90.9 MHz. KVTI could not be heard in most of Snohomish County, Washington.

In the fall of 2013, the KSER Foundation signed on a second signal: 89.9 KXIR, Freeland. The second tower is located on Whidbey Island in the town of Freeland. At present, KSER and KXIR simulcast programming. As of 2014, KSER has a board of directors, staff, and over 100 volunteers. KSER's programming consists of news, public affairs, talk and diversified music shows and world news from the BBC.

== Jack Straw Foundation ==
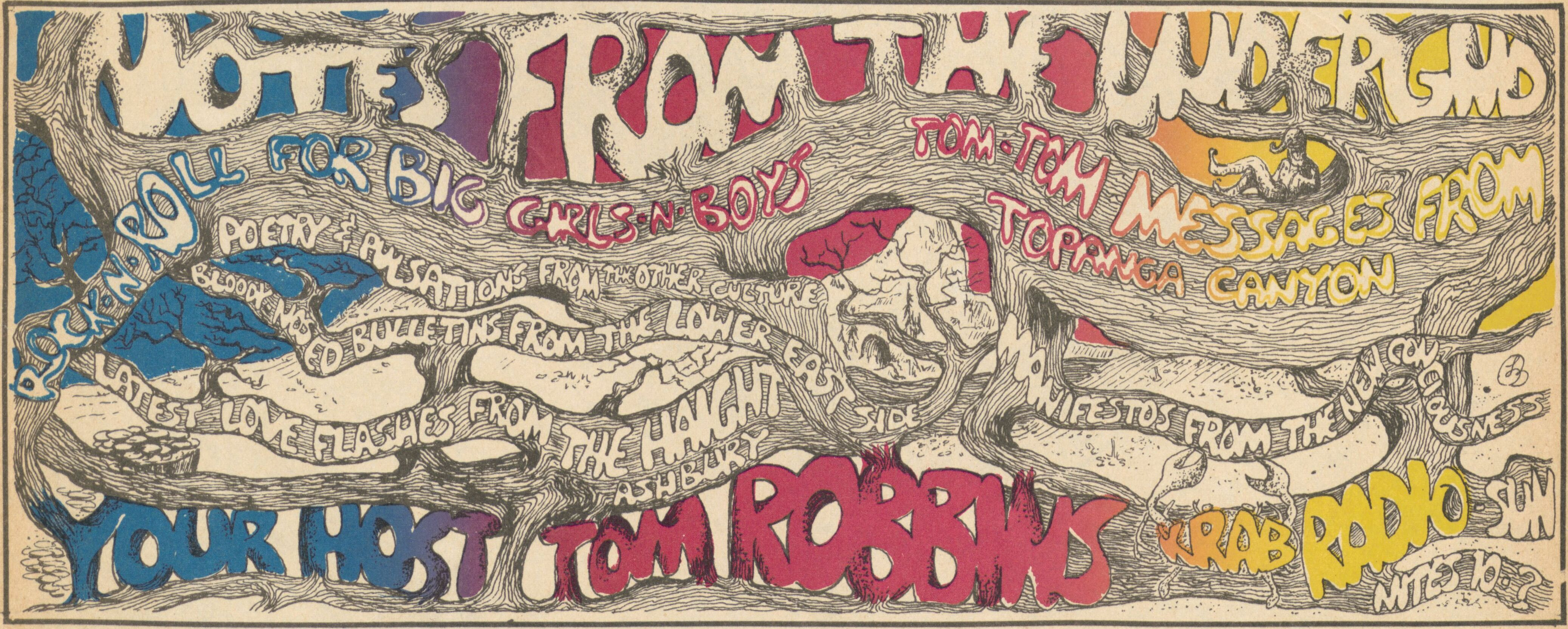
A 1967 ad for Tom Robbins's KRAB radio show, Notes From The Underground, drawn by Walt Crowley.

The Jack Straw Foundation was founded in 1962 by Lorenzo Wilson Milam, with the goal of starting KRAB-FM. On the first day, its transmitter blew up. The Foundation also started KBOO and KSER, KTAO and assisted KDNA. KRAB's frequency was sold in 1984. In 1989 Jack Straw moved to Roosevelt Way. The Jack Straw Foundation was named after a leader of the English Peasant Revolt of 1381.

== See also ==
- List of community radio stations in the United States
