= KYVT =

Radio station in Yakima, Washington

- Yakima, Washington; United States
- Broadcast area: Yakima, Washington
- Frequency: 88.5 MHz

Programming
- Format: Public Radio
- Affiliations: Northwest Public Radio

Ownership
- Owner: Yakima District No. 7

History
- First air date: 1980-09-08 (as KYSC)
- Former call signs: KYSC (1980–2000)

Technical information
- Licensing authority: FCC
- Facility ID: 74320
- Class: A
- ERP: 135 watts
- HAAT: 258 meters (846 ft)
- Transmitter coordinates: 46°35′6.00″N 120°31′41.00″W

Links
- Public license information: Public file; LMS

KYVT (88.5 FM) is a radio station in Yakima, Washington. The station is owned by the Yakima School District. On August 14, 2012, the station began carrying the NPR News Service of Northwest Public Radio, via a partnership between the Yakima School District, the Yakima Valley Technical Skills Center, and Washington State University, which also includes educational opportunities for students interested in broadcasting careers. Previously, station programming originated at the Yakima Valley Technical Skills Center, and was an alternative rock format. The original programming format is now carried on HD Radio via KNWY

== History ==
The station went on the air as KYSC on 1980-09-08. On 2000-02-04, the station changed its call sign to the current KYVT.
