= KUOW (AM) =

Simulcast of KUOW-FM, Seattle
- Tumwater, Washington; United States
- Frequency: 1340 kHz
- Branding: KUOW 94.9

Programming
- Format: News/talk
- Affiliations: American Public Media; National Public Radio; Public Radio Exchange

Ownership
- Owner: University of Washington
- Operator: KUOW Puget Sound Public Media
- Sister stations: KUOW-FM

History
- First air date: 1985
- Former call signs: KCIG (1985); KCIF (1985–1986); KVSN (1986–2006)

Technical information
- Licensing authority: FCC
- Facility ID: 20298
- Class: C
- Power: 1,000 watts unlimited
- Transmitter coordinates: 47°0′25″N 122°55′7″W
- Translator: 107.3 K297BK (Olympia)

Links
- Public license information: Public file; LMS
- Webcast: Listen live
- Website: www.kuow.org

KUOW (1340 AM, "News & Information") is a radio station with a news/talk format. Licensed to Tumwater, Washington, United States, the station is owned by the University of Washington and operated by KUOW Puget Sound Public Radio. It features programming from American Public Media, National Public Radio (NPR), and Public Radio Exchange. The station is a simulcast of sister station KUOW-FM.

The station first signed on the air in 1985 with the call letters KCIG. It was originally licensed to Tumwater, Washington, and operated as a local outlet for the Olympia metropolitan area. Shortly after its debut, the station changed its call sign to KCIF in 1985, and then to KVSN in 1986.

Under the KVSN identity, the station broadcast religious programming for two decades, serving as a Christian radio outlet for the South Sound region. In 2006, the University of Washington purchased the station to expand the reach of its Seattle-based public radio service. On April 3, 2006, the station officially adopted the KUOW call sign, mirroring its sister station on 94.9 FM.

Since the acquisition, the station has served as a full-time simulcast of KUOW-FM, providing NPR news and information programming to listeners in Thurston County who may have difficulty receiving the primary Seattle signal. The station currently operates at a power of 1,000 watts, broadcasting 24 hours a day from its transmitter site in Tumwater.
