= KWSU-TV =

Television station in Pullman, Washington (1962–2025)

Defunct
- Pullman–Clarkston, Washington; United States
- City: Pullman, Washington
- Channels: Digital: 10 (VHF); Virtual: 10
- Branding: Northwest Public Broadcasting

Programming
- Affiliations: NET (1962–1970); PBS (1970–2025)

Ownership
- Owner: Washington State University
- Sister stations: KWSU (AM), KRFA-FM, KJEM-FM

History
- First air date: September 24, 1962
- Last air date: December 31, 2025
- Former call signs: KWSC-TV (1962–1969)
- Former channel numbers: Analog: 10 (VHF, 1962–2008); Digital: 17 (UHF, until 2009)
- Call sign meaning: Washington State University

Technical information
- Licensing authority: FCC
- Facility ID: 71024
- ERP: 23 kW
- HAAT: 408 m (1,339 ft)
- Transmitter coordinates: 46°51′42.3″N 117°10′32.5″W
- Translator(s): 33 (UHF) Spokane; K34QC-D Lewiston, ID

Links
- Public license information: Public file; LMS
- Website: www.nwpb.org

KWSU-TV (channel 10) was a PBS member television station licensed to Pullman, Washington, United States. Owned by Washington State University (WSU), it was part of the Northwest Public Broadcasting (NWPB) network. KWSU-TV's studios were located in the Murrow Communications Center (Room 382) within Jackson Hall on WSU's main campus on Veterans Way in Pullman, and its transmitter was located on Kamiak Butte near Palouse, Washington.

KWSU-TV's main signal served a corner of the Spokane market as a "beta" station through the Program Differentiation Plan complementing KSPS-TV and Idaho Public Television. The station was carried on the Spokane DirecTV and Dish Network feeds, which expanded its potential audience to over 600,000 people in Washington, Idaho, Oregon and Montana. KWSU-TV was also available on Xfinity systems in the Spokane area, and operated a translator on UHF channel 33 in Spokane.

KWSU-TV operated as a sister station in Richland, Washington, KTNW (channel 31), which serves as a full PBS member for the Tri-Cities area. Although this station maintains its own studios on the WSU Tri-Cities campus in Richland, master control and most internal operations are based at KWSU-TV's facilities.

== History ==
Old KWSU/KTNW logo from 2003 to 2006

KWSU signed on the air on September 24, 1962, as KWSC-TV (standing for Washington State College, the name of Washington State University until 1959), and changed its callsign to KWSU-TV in March 1969, a year before the launch of PBS.

The station used the Washington State University cougar logo as its official logo until 1976.

KWSU signed on KTNW on channel 31 on October 18, 1987. The channel 31 allotment in the Tri-Cities was briefly used in the late 1950s by KTRX, based in Kennewick, Washington; after that station signed off, channel 31 in the Tri-Cities remained vacant until KTNW signed on.

KWSU discontinued regular programming on its analog signal, over VHF channel 10, on February 17, 2009, the original date on which full-power television stations in the United States were to transition from analog to digital broadcasts under federal mandate (which was later pushed back to June 12, 2009). The station's digital signal relocated from its pre-transition UHF channel 17 to its analog-era VHF channel 10.

From 2017 to 2018, KWSU and KTNW used the "nwptv" branding. Since 2018, both stations have switched to the "Northwest Public Broadcasting" branding, which was a modified version of the "Northwest Public Television" branding used from 2006 to 2017.

Washington State University and Northwest Public Broadcasting announced in October 2025 that KWSU-TV would cease operations on December 31; the closure followed the loss of federal funding for the Corporation for Public Broadcasting and a $1.8 million cut to NWPB's budget. NWPB's radio network (based at KWSU radio) and KTNW would continue operations; the station's donors would retain access to PBS Passport via KTNW, and other PBS programming would remain available in the Pullman and Spokane areas via KSPS-TV and Idaho Public Television.

== Technical information ==
=== Subchannels ===
The station's signal was multiplexed:

Subchannels of KWSU-TV
Channel	Res.	Short name	Programming
10.1	1080i	KWSU-HD	PBS
10.2	480i	KWSUHD2	Create

KWSU offered ResearchChannel on subchannel 10.2 until that service was discontinued in August 2010.

=== Translators ===
- KWSU-TV (DRT) 33 Spokane
- K34QC-D 34 Lewiston, ID

== See also ==
- KTNW
- Northwest Public Radio
