= Barry Serafin =

American television journalist (born 1941)

- Born: June 22, 1941 (age 85); Coquille, Oregon
- Education: Washington State University (BA)
- Occupation: Broadcast journalist
- Years active: 1964–2004
- Spouse: Lynn Van Camp (m. 1963–present)
- Children: 2
- Awards: News & Documentary Emmy Award

Barry Serafin (born June 22, 1941) is an American retired television journalist and former weekend anchor of ABC World News.

== Biography ==
An Oregon native, born in Coquille and raised in Roseburg, Serafin graduated from Washington State University in 1964 and began his journalism career at the university's public radio station.

In television, he reported for Oregon Public Broadcasting station KOAP-TV and CBS-affiliate KOIN-TV before moving to Missouri for a position as reporter and anchor for KMOX-TV. From there he began a decade of service with the CBS Washington, D.C. bureau, winning an Emmy award for his contribution to their May 1, 1974 documentary, "Watergate: The White House Transcripts." He joined ABC News in 1979, first as a foreign correspondent sub-anchoring segments from Tehran during the Iran hostage crisis and then becoming a national correspondent for the network in 1981. Serafin anchored ABC World News Saturday from 1987 to 1988. He received the Regents Distinguished Alumnus Award from his alma mater, Washington State University, in 1992. He retired in 2004.
