= KNKX =

Public radio station in Tacoma, Washington

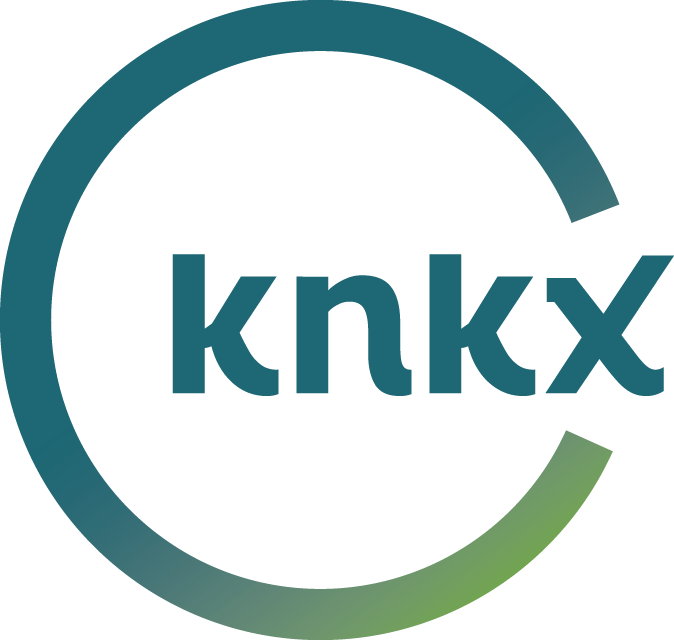
- Tacoma, Washington; United States
- Broadcast area: Seattle metropolitan area
- Frequency: 88.5 MHz (HD Radio)
- Branding: 88.5 KNKX

Programming
- Format: Jazz; All-news radio
- Subchannels: HD2: Jazz24
- Affiliations: NPR

Ownership
- Owner: Pacific Public Media

History
- First air date: November 16, 1966 (as KPLU-FM)
- Former call signs: KPLU-FM (1966–2016)
- Call sign meaning: "Connects"

Technical information
- Licensing authority: FCC
- Facility ID: 51199
- Class: C
- ERP: 68,000 watts
- HAAT: 707 meters (2,320 ft)
- Transmitter coordinates: 47.504°N 121.976°W
- Translator: See § Translators

Links
- Public license information: Public file; LMS
- Webcast: KNKX MP3; KNKX AAC+ Jazz24 MP3; Jazz24 AAC+(HD2)
- Website: www.knkx.org

KNKX (88.5 MHz) is a public radio station licensed to Tacoma, Washington, United States. A member of National Public Radio (NPR), it airs a jazz and news format for the Seattle metropolitan area. The station is owned by Pacific Public Media, a community-based non-profit organization. It operates from studios inside Suite 500 of the Madore Building on Western Avenue in downtown Seattle and inside the C.N. Gardner Building on Broadway in downtown Tacoma. KNKX broadcasts from West Tiger Mountain in the Issaquah Alps with a power of 68,000 watts.

The station originally debuted in 1966 as KPLU-FM, owned by Parkland-based Pacific Lutheran University (PLU). It became a community licensee in 2016 after a proposed sale to the University of Washington, owner of fellow NPR station KUOW-FM in Seattle, which resulted in opposition from station listeners.

KNKX runs jazz programs middays, evenings and overnight, and carries a variety of NPR programs in other dayparts, including All Things Considered, Morning Edition, Wait Wait... Don't Tell Me! and Fresh Air. The locally produced BirdNote airs every morning.

== History ==
KNKX was the brainchild of Chris Knudzen, a regent of PLU from Burlington who, in 1951, donated the then-under construction Eastvold Chapel (now the Karen Hille Phillips Center for the Performing Arts) with a radio studio to the university under the desire of having it host a radio station. While the studio was used extensively, it took 15 years for the station to debut; the station formally signed on the air as KPLU-FM on November 16, 1966, with the inaugural broadcast featuring a short speech from President Robert Mortvedt and interviews with local community leaders. It was primarily run by university students and played jazz, blues and other music not usually heard on commercial radio stations. Originally, it broadcast from a tower on campus that was only 140 feet tall, effectively limiting its coverage area to Tacoma and adjacent suburbs. Over time, the station added news programs from NPR to its schedule. It improved its coverage area, both by increasing its power and relocating to a tower that is 2,320 feet (710 meters) Height Above Average Terrain, allowing it to challenge established NPR member KUOW. For listeners outside the Tacoma-Seattle area, it set up eleven translators and simulcast stations.

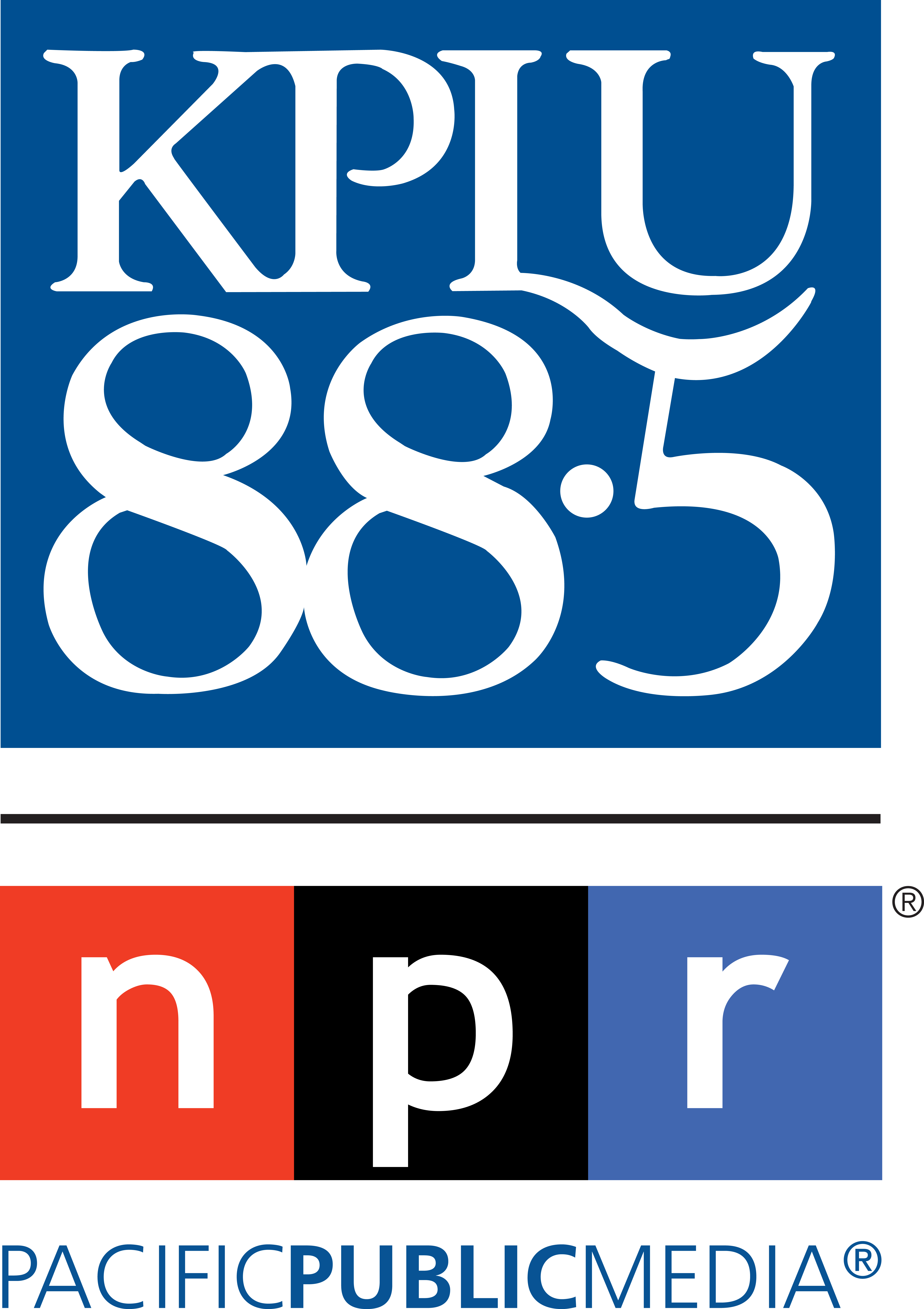
Logo prior to August 31, 2016

On November 12, 2015, Pacific Lutheran University announced its intention to sell the station to the University of Washington, owner of KUOW. The planned sale to UW triggered public outcry from KPLU's listener base, who feared KPLU's unique programming would be sacrificed if it became a sister station to KUOW. On November 23, the KPLU advisory board voted unanimously to oppose the sale. The board sought to negotiate with a community-based non-profit group, Friends of 88.5, to raise $7,000,000 to buy the radio station and its network of translators and rebroadcasters from the university, keeping it independent. By May 26, 2016, some 20,000 supporters met the goal. Friends of 88.5 began negotiating with PLU to purchase the station.

On August 12, 2016, it was announced that the station would adopt the new call letters KNKX, pronounced like "Connects", which was chosen among several other choices by the station's listening audience. The new call sign went into effect when the station officially changed hands from PLU to Friends of 88.5 on August 30, 2016; the change was made as the station could not keep the KPLU callsign (as it was university property) during the sale negotiations. In October 2018, it was announced that KNKX would move their Tacoma studio to downtown Tacoma, at 930 Broadway. On August 29, 2019, the first live broadcast from their new home was aired by Dick Stein. The station hosted a grand opening celebration on September 7, 2019.

KNKX announced plans to relocate its Seattle studio to the Madore Building, part of Pike Place Market, in March 2022. A grand opening and public open house is scheduled for August 26, 2023. The larger space, on the fifth floor of the Madore Building, was obtained with a 10-year lease and include five studios.

== Translators ==
KNKX is also carried on the following satellite and broadcast translator stations to improve reception of the station:

Call sign	Frequency	City of license	Facility ID	Class	ERP (W)	Height (m (ft))	Transmitter coordinates
KPLI	90.1 FM	Olympia, Washington	91212	A	100	−17 m (−56 ft)	47°2′23.3″N 122°54′7.5″W
KVIX	89.3 FM	Port Angeles, Washington	91468	A	600	149 m (489 ft)	48°9′2.3″N 123°40′13.7″W
KPLK	88.9 FM	Sedro-Woolley, Washington	173038	A	730	47 m (154 ft)	48°32′29.4″N 122°17′47.6″W

Broadcast translators for KNKX
Call sign	Frequency	City of license	FID	FCC info
K265DP	100.9 FM	Aberdeen, Washington	51200	LMS
K204BI	88.7 FM	Bellingham, Washington	51195	LMS
K211AP	90.1 FM	Centralia, Washington	51201	LMS
K284BM	104.7 FM	Longview, Washington	38908	LMS
K288GG	105.5 FM	Mount Vernon, Washington	51198	LMS
K214FI	90.7 FM	Raymond, Washington	51196	LMS
K221FR	92.1 FM	West Seattle, Washington	51202	LMS
K244EV	96.7 FM	Woodland, Washington	142359	LMS

The West Seattle translator serves portions of Seattle that are shielded by hilly terrain from the main KNKX signal. It was at 88.1 FM until 2012.

== Presenters ==
- Ken Wiley hosted Art of Jazz for four decades. until his retirement in 2023. He died on February 2, 2026, at the age of 87.

== See also ==
- List of jazz radio stations in the United States
