= KWSU (AM) =

Northwest Public Radio station in Pullman, Washington

Coordinates: 46°41′46.6″N 117°14′47.6″W

- Pullman, Washington; United States
- Frequency: 1250 kHz

Programming
- Format: Public radio–news/talk
- Affiliations: NPR; American Public Media; Public Radio Exchange; BBC World Service

Ownership
- Owner: Washington State University
- Sister stations: KRFA-FM; KJEM; KWSU-TV

History
- First air date: December 10, 1922; 103 years ago (experimental 1908-1922)
- Former call signs: KFAE (1922–1925); KWSC (1925–1969)
- Former frequencies: 833 kHz (1922–1924); 908 kHz (1924–1925); 900 kHz (1925); 860 kHz (1925–1927); 760 kHz (1927–1928); 1390 kHz (1928–1929); 1220 kHz (1929–1941)

Technical information
- Licensing authority: FCC
- Facility ID: 71025
- Class: B
- Power: 5,000 watts (day); 2,500 watts (night)

Links
- Public license information: Public file; LMS
- Website: www.nwpb.org

KWSU (1250 khz) is a non-commercial radio station licensed to Pullman, Washington. It is owned by Washington State University, and is the flagship station of Northwest Public Radio's NPR News network. It airs a news/talk radio format, using programming from NPR, American Public Media and Public Radio Exchange, as well as locally produced offerings.

By day, KWSU broadcasts at 5,000 watts. At night, to protect other stations on 1250 AM from interference, it reduces power to 2,500 watts. The station's transmitter is on Flat Road at Country Club Road in Pullman.

== Programming ==
Most of KWSU's programs are news-oriented. Weekdays, it carries from NPR: Morning Edition, All Things Considered, Fresh Air, 1A, Here and Now and Marketplace. From the CBC, it runs As It Happens. And overnight, the BBC World Service is heard. Weekends feature specialty shows including The Moth Radio Hour, On The Media, This American Life, The New Yorker Radio Hour, Latino USA, To the Best of Our Knowledge and Wait Wait... Don't Tell Me!.

== History ==
Washington State University was known as the State College of Washington beginning in 1905. Research at the college in radio communication, initially with Morse code transmissions using spark-gap transmitters, reportedly began in 1908. In early 1916, the college was issued a license for a "Technical and Training School" station, with the call sign 7YI. However, in April 1917, due to the entrance of the United States into World War I, most non-government stations were ordered to cease operations.

Effective December 1, 1921, the Commerce Department, which regulated radio at this time, adopted rules formally defining "broadcasting stations". The wavelength of 360 meters (833 kHz) was designated for entertainment broadcasts, while 485 meters (619 kHz) was reserved for broadcasting official weather and other government reports.

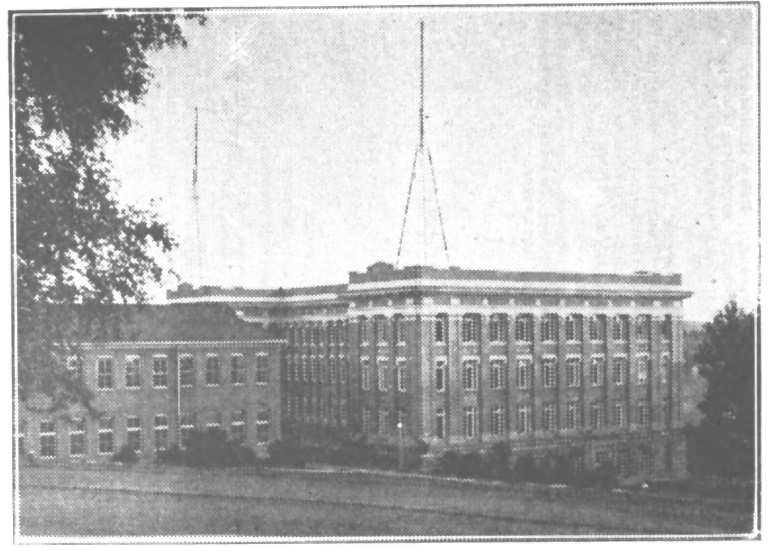
KFAE facilities were located at the Mechanic Arts Building on the State College of Washington campus. The station's transmitting antenna was strung between two towers constructed atop the building.

On June 21, 1922, the State College of Washington was issued a license for a new station operating on 360 meters in Pullman. This station was issued the call letters KFAE, which were randomly assigned from an alphabetical roster of available call signs. Construction was financed by Associated Students along with the Pullman Chamber of Commerce. The station was erected by the experimental engineering department at an estimated cost of $1,000 to $2,000, for a savings of between $9,000 and $10,000. Dean H. V. Carpenter of the engineering college initially hoped to have KFAE operational by September 1, prior to the September 19 start of the fall semester.

KFAE's formal debut, using a 5 watt transmitter, was delayed until December 10. The station's studio and transmitter were located in adjoining rooms in the basement of the Mechanic Arts Building. A transmitting antenna was constructed on the building roof, consisting of 6 wires strung between two 70-foot (21-meter) tall towers. In mid-1923 the station's regular schedule was from 7 to 8 p.m. on Monday, Wednesday and Friday evenings.

In early 1924, KFAE was assigned to 908 kHz. Its frequency was changed to 900 kHz in early 1925. In the summer of 1925, the station's call letters were changed from KFAE to KWSC, to reflect the college's initials. It switched to 860 kHz in early 1925, and to 760 kHz in 1927. On November 11, 1928, it moved to 1390 kHz under the provisions of the Federal Radio Commission's General Order 40. In late 1929, KWSC moved to 1220 kHz. Beginning in 1931 KTW in Seattle moved to this frequency as well, with the two stations using 1220 on a timesharing basis. On March 29, 1941, along with all the other stations on 1220 kHz, KWSC and KTW moved to 1250 kHz, the frequency KWSU has occupied ever since, as part of the implementation of the North American Regional Broadcasting Agreement (NARBA).

Some noted radio and television personalities have gotten their start at the station. Longtime CBS newsman Edward R. Murrow began his career on KWSC, in addition to ABC sportscaster Keith Jackson and newscaster Barry Serafin.

In July 1935, a major fire swept the station. It remained off the air until the following September. In 1944, the station was operating for 89 hours per week.

The call letters were changed to KWSU on March 1, 1969, ten years after Washington State attained university status. KWSU is a charter member of NPR, and was one of the 90 stations that carried the inaugural broadcast of All Things Considered in 1971, NPR's first show. The studios moved to the third floor of the east wing of the Murrow Communications Center in the 1970s.

== See also ==
- List of initial AM-band station grants in the United States
