= BirdNote =

Radio program

BirdNote Daily
- Running time: 1 minute 45 seconds
- Country of origin: United States
- Language: English
- Syndicates: self-syndicated via ContentDepot
- Original release: February 21, 2005
- Website: birdnote.org
- Podcast: birdnote.org/get-podcasts-rss

BirdNote is a nonprofit public media organization that aims to inspire people to care about the natural world and take steps to protect it. BirdNote produces BirdNote Daily, a daily radio program dedicated to sharing the joy and wonder of birds with listeners and promoting the conservation of birds and their habitats. BirdNote also produces longform podcasts Bring Birds Back and Threatened, and the Spanish language show, BirdNote en Español. BirdNote Daily episodes are two-minute vignettes that incorporate the sounds of birds with stories that illustrate their way of life. Shows can be heard on radio, online, and as a podcast. BirdNote's Executive Director is Nick Bayard.

The BirdNote Daily radio broadcast originated in the Pacific Northwest under the umbrella of the Seattle Audubon Society, a chapter of the National Audubon Society and operates as a 501(c)(3) nonprofit, Tune In to Nature.Org. BirdNote Daily airs twice daily on KNKX, an affiliate of National Public Radio, and also on KTOO-FM, KJJF, KWMR, WNPR/Connecticut Public Radio, WRVO, KPBX, KCAW, KYRS, KPFZ, KHSU, KRTS, KUNM, and more than 300 other public radio stations across the United States, Canada, and Mexico. BirdNote's podcasts reaches approximately 200 countries and sovereign territories. Stories include natural history, equity and accessibility in birding, environmental conservation, the language and music of birds, and other topics.

BirdNote's mission statement is: "Birds connect us with the joy and wonder of nature. By telling vivid, sound-rich stories about birds and the challenges they face, BirdNote inspires listeners to care about the natural world — and take steps to protect it." Story subjects and interviewees have included J. Drew Lanham, Amy Tan, Christian Cooper, Rachel Carson, Corina Newsome, Deja Perkins, Roger Tory Peterson, Tig Notaro, Aldo Leopold, Frank Chapman, Barry Lopez, Terry Tempest Williams, H. Jon Benjamin, David Allen Sibley, Ivan Doig, Tony Angell, whooping crane migration, the extinction of the dodo, birds in myth, music, and pop culture, and the natural history of hundreds of species of birds. BirdNote also produces special series featuring the organizers of Black Birders Week and Indigenous leaders.

== Contributors ==
Most bird sounds for BirdNote are provided by the Macaulay Library of the Cornell Laboratory of Ornithology. Writers have included Dennis Paulson, Curator Emeritus of The Slater Museum of Natural History at the University of Puget Sound, the late Robert Sundstrom, birding-by-ear expert with the Seattle Audubon Society, Francis Wood, and other writers and naturalists. Shows are reviewed for scientific accuracy by a panel of advisors. Narrators include Michael Stein, Ariana Remmel, Mary McCann, Frank Corrado, and many others. John Kessler, of NPR’s Mountain Stage fame, was the senior producer. All shows have a companion photo, many of which were taken by photographer-naturalist, Paul Bannick. BirdNote's theme music was composed and played by John Kessler and Nancy Rumbel of Tingstad and Rumbel.
