= KUOW-FM =

Public radio station in Seattle

Coordinates: 47.616°N 122.309°W

- Seattle, Washington; United States
- Broadcast area: Seattle metropolitan area
- Frequency: 94.9 MHz (HD Radio)
- Branding: KUOW 94.9

Programming
- Format: News/talk
- Affiliations: NPR

Ownership
- Owner: University of Washington
- Operator: KUOW Puget Sound Public Radio

History
- First air date: 1952
- Former frequencies: 90.5 MHz (1952–1958)
- Call sign meaning: University of Washington

Technical information
- Licensing authority: FCC
- Facility ID: 66571
- Class: C1
- ERP: 100,000 watts
- HAAT: 224 meters (735 ft)
- Translator: 90.7 K214EW (Bellingham)
- Repeaters: 90.3 KQOW (Bellingham); 1340 KUOW (Tumwater)

Links
- Public license information: Public file; LMS
- Webcast: Listen live
- Website: kuow.org

KUOW-FM (94.9 MHz) is a National Public Radio member station in Seattle, Washington. It is the largest of the three full-fledged NPR member stations in the Seattle and Tacoma media market, with two Tacoma-based stations, KNKX and KVTI being the others. It is a service of the University of Washington, but is operated by KUOW Puget Sound Public Radio, a nonprofit community organization. Studios are located on University Way in Seattle's University District, while the transmitter is on Capitol Hill.

== History ==
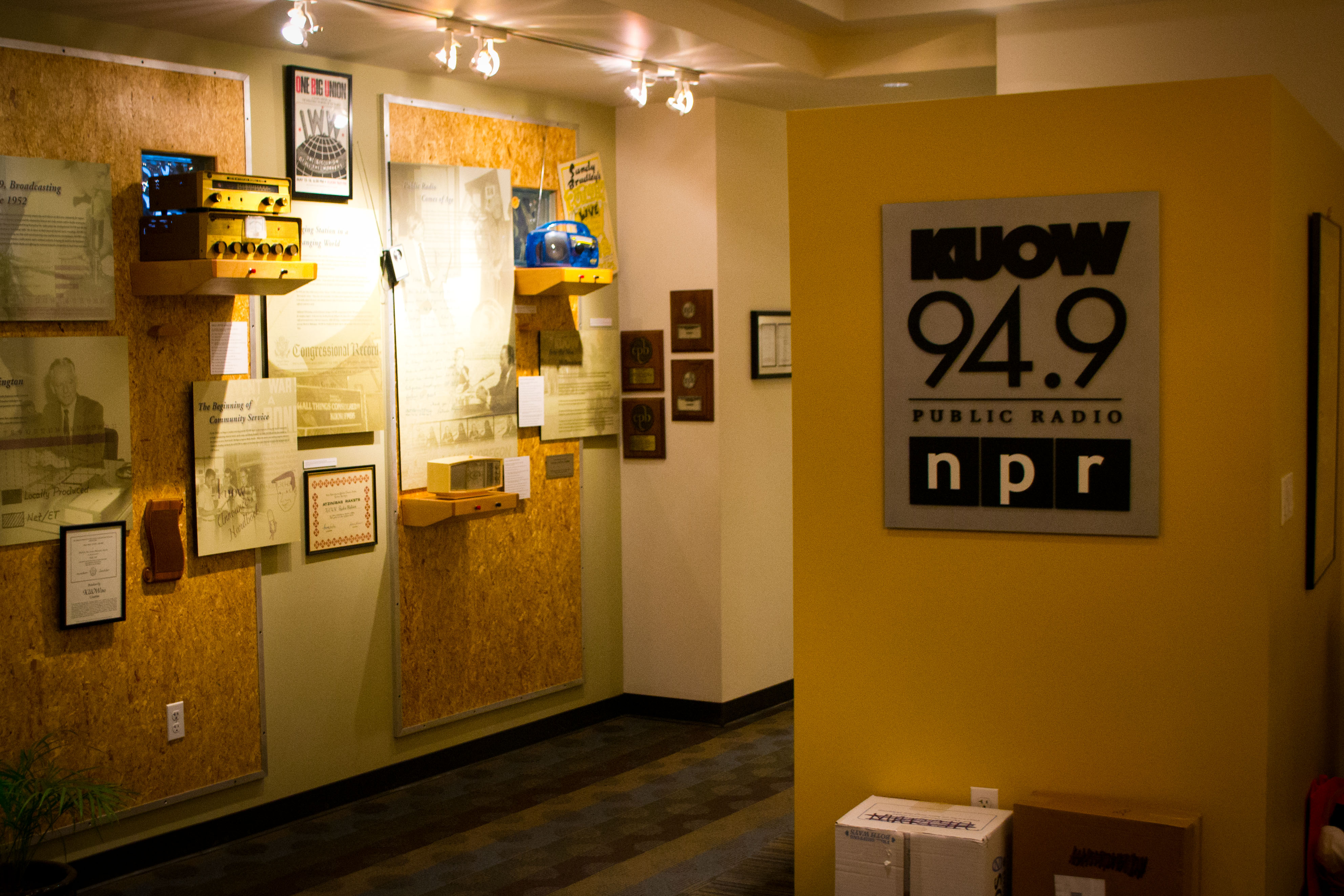
KUOW lobby

KUOW went on the air in 1952 on 90.5 FM. Its transmitter was on the University of Washington (UW) campus atop the Administration Building, now Gerberding Hall. In 1958, Dorothy Stimson Bullitt moved KING-FM to 98.1 and gifted KING's 94.9 FM transmitter and antenna to Edison Vocational School (now Seattle Central College). That same year, KUOW started using the 94.9 FM transmitter operated by Edison. KUOW is one of the few public radio (or any non-commercial educational) stations in the United States broadcasting on a frequency outside of the reserved band (88–92 MHz; KING-FM itself would switch to non-commercial operation in 2010). From its 1954 sign-on until 1987, KUOW was a sister station to educational/NET television outlet (and now PBS member station) KCTS-TV (channel 9); the university spun off KCTS in 1987 and became a community licensee.

In the 1960s, KUOW began branching out, adding more news programming. It was a charter member of NPR in 1970. In 1992, it changed format from music to news and information, and in 1999 it moved off campus to its current location on University Way. Also in 1999, UW outsourced the station's operation to Puget Sound Public Radio.

In late March 2020, KUOW "made an editorial decision to stop airing White House briefings on the coronavirus pandemic live on a daily basis". A statement from the station asserted that the decision was not politically based, and their "greater concern was the potential impact of false information on the health and safety of our community".

For several weeks in January and February 2022, a technical glitch with HD Radio caused the infotainment systems of Mazda vehicles made between 2014 and 2017 to only play KUOW's signal and flash repeatedly. Mazda blamed the issue on a missing file extension in KUOW's station logo image; KUOW had ruled out a theory that the rollout of 5G networks had interfered with the existing 3G data received by infotainment systems.

== Audience ==
KUOW reported that the station served an average of 413,600 listeners each week in 2019, down from 447,100 in 2018. The station also reported that their on-demand audio and podcasts received 2.9 million downloads total.

KUOW-FM broadcasts in HD. On March 7, 2018, KUOW made the decision to discontinue the HD2, HD3, and HD4 subchannels. "KUOW2" continues to be transmitted on translator K214EW 90.7 and KQOW-HD2 in Bellingham, while KUOW Jazz was discontinued. The main analog signal continues to be simulcast on HD1.

KUOW is also carried on the following satellite and broadcast translator stations to improve reception of the station:

- KQOW 90.3 FM Bellingham
- KUOW 1340 AM Tumwater and Olympia

== Finances ==
For KUOW's fiscal year ending June 30, 2019, the station reported total revenue of $18,732,286 and total expenses of $18,339,864, for a net gain of $392,422. Its sources of revenue were:

- 68% individuals
- 24% businesses
- 6% institutions such as Corporation for Public Broadcasting and University of Washington
- 2% other expenses such as interest and dividends or donated services and supplies

== Programs ==
KUOW broadcast the Washington Talking Book and Braille Library's Evergreen Radio Reading Service to blind and handicapped listeners on its 67 kHz subcarrier, until the service's closure on August 15, 2014. KUOW was one of three major FM stations in Washington to do so; KPBX-FM in Spokane and KFAE-FM in Yakima were the others.

=== Music programming ===
- The Swing Years and Beyond: a program that ran from 1968 to 2017 featuring jazz, swing, and blues music from the early 20th century.

=== Podcasts ===
- Battle Tactics for Your Sexist Workplace
- How's Your Day?
- KUOW Newsroom
- KUOW Shorts
- Primed
- Radioactive
- Seattle Now
- Second Wave
- SoundQs
- Speakers Forum
- The Wild With Chris Morgan

==== How to Be a Girl ====
How to Be a Girl is a parenting podcast hosted by a mother using the pseudonym Marlo Mack to discuss her experiences raising her transgender child. Mack had been recording her child since she was a baby and had recently joined a local radio club when her daughter began expressing that she was not a boy, which lead to the production of the podcast. The podcast has been nominated for a Peabody award and has won both a Webby award for best writing as well as the international award from the British Podcast Awards. Freddie McConnell of The Guardian praised the show calling it a "tender take on an under-represented reality" and Katy Cowan of Creative Boom praised the show saying that it was "a revealing and often emotional podcast."

==== The Record ====
The Record is KUOW's flagship local news and interview podcast hosted by Bill Radke that debuted in the fall of 2013 and ended in July 2021. After a neo-Nazi was punched for wearing a Nazi band in public, Radke interviewed the neo-Nazi on the show, which was received negatively from the show's audience and led to Radke apologizing for doing the interview. Week in Review is the Friday edition of The Record, which won an award in 1996 for the best commentary and analysis from the Society for Professional Journalist.

==== Soundside ====
Soundside is a midday news podcast hosted by Libby Denkman that airs on KUOW on Mondays through Thursdays. The show was created after The Record ended.

==== Terrestrial ====
Terrestrial was an environmental podcast hosted by Ashley Ahearn which ran from April 2017 until December 2017. Ahearn started the podcast because she felt that most environmental journalism is impersonal and she wanted to explore how individuals cope with climate change rather than the discouraging state of the world. The podcast was nominated for Best Green Podcast in 2020 at the iHeartRadio Podcast Awards and was featured on Outside Online as the best environmental podcast of 2017. Jillian Capewell of HuffPost praised the show saying that the podcast is an "informative show in a sound-rich and powerful audioscape" and Rowan Slaney of The Guardian praised the show saying that "it absolutely blew me away."
