= List of radio stations in Nebraska =

The following is a list of FCC-licensed radio stations in the U.S. state of Nebraska which can be sorted by their call signs, frequencies, cities of license, licensees, and programming formats.

== List of radio stations ==
Call sign	Frequency	City of license	Licensee	Format
KAAQ	105.9 FM	Alliance	Eagle Communications	Country
KADL	102.9 FM	Imperial	Armada Media – McCook, Inc.	Classic hits
KAGR-LP	92.1 FM	Arapahoe	The Evangelical Lutheran Trinity Cong. of Arapahoe, NE.	Religious Teaching
KAMI	1580 AM	Cozad	Nebraska Rural Radio Association	Classic country
KAQQ-LP	99.9 FM	Alliance	Adventist Learning Center of Alliance	Religious (Radio 74 Internationale)
KAWL	1370 AM	York	Nebraska Rural Radio Association	Classic hits
KAYA	91.3 FM	Hubbard	American Family Association	Religious Talk (AFR)
KBBK	107.3 FM	Lincoln	NRG License Sub, LLC	Hot adult contemporary
KBBN-FM	95.3 FM	Broken Bow	Custer County Broadcasting Co.	Classic rock
KBBX-FM	97.7 FM	Nebraska City	Flood Communications of Omaha, LLC	Regional Mexican
KBDP-LP	99.9 FM	Bridgeport	Adventist Learning Center of Bridgeport	Religious (Radio 74 Internationale)
KBIE	103.1 FM	Auburn	Flood Broadcasting, Inc.	Country
KBPY	107.7 FM	Hay Springs	Chadrad Communications, Inc.	Rock
KBRB	1400 AM	Ainsworth	Sandhills Broadcasting LLC	Country
KBRB-FM	92.7 FM	Ainsworth	Sandhills Broadcasting LLC	Classic hits
KBRL	1300 AM	McCook	Armada Media – McCook, Inc.	News/Talk
KBRX	1350 AM	O'Neill	Ranchland Broadcasting Co.	Classic hits
KBRX-FM	102.9 FM	O'Neill	Ranchland Broadcasting Co., Inc.	Country
KBRY	92.3 FM	Sargent	Nebraska Rural Radio Association	Country
KCFD	88.1 FM	Crawford	Southern Cultural Foundation	
KCGW-LP	107.1 FM	Edgar	Williams Life Radio	Variety
KCMI	97.1 FM	Terrytown	Christian Media Incorporated	Religious
KCNB	94.7 FM	Chadron	Eagle Communications, Inc.	Pop contemporary hit radio
KCNE-FM	91.9 FM	Chadron	Nebraska Educational Telecommunications	Classical
KCNI	1280 AM	Broken Bow	Custer County Broadcasting Co.	Country
KCNT	88.1 FM	Hastings	Central Community College	Pop contemporary hit radio
KCOW	1400 AM	Alliance	Eagle Communications	Classic hits
KCPJ-LP	105.7 FM	Crete	Crete Progressive Educational Broadcasting Corporation	Religious (Radio 74 Internationale)
KCRO	660 AM	Omaha	Hickory Radio, LLC	Religious
KCSR	610 AM	Chadron	Chadrad Communications, Inc.	Country
KCTY	1590 AM	Wayne	Wayne Radio Works LLC	Classic hits
KCUG-LP	100.3 FM	Omaha	Gospel Music Omaha	Urban gospel
KCVG	89.9 FM	Hastings	Community Broadcasting, Inc.	Religious Talk (Bott Radio Network)
KCVN	104.5 FM	Cozad	Community Broadcasting, Inc.	Religious Talk (Bott Radio Network)
KDAI	89.1 FM	Scottsbluff	Educational Media Foundation	Contemporary Worship (Air1)
KDAM	94.3 FM	Hartington	Riverfront Broadcasting LLC	Hot adult contemporary
KDJL	99.5 FM	Kilgore	DJ Broadcasting Inc.	Country
KDNE	91.9 FM	Crete	Doane College Board of Trustees	College radio
KEJS	88.1 FM	Sargent	VSS Catholic Communications, Inc.	Catholic
KELN	97.1 FM	North Platte	Eagle Communications	Pop contemporary hit radio
KETT	99.5 FM	Mitchell	VSS Catholic Communications, Inc.	Catholic
KETW	90.5 FM	Ogallala	VSS Catholic Communications, Inc.	Catholic
KEXL	97.5 FM	Pierce	WJAG Incorporated	Adult contemporary
KEZO-FM	92.3 FM	Omaha	SM-KEZO-FM, LLC	Mainstream rock
KFAB	1110 AM	Omaha	iHM Licenses, LLC	News Talk Information
KFFF	93.3 FM	Bennington	iHM Licenses, LLC	Classic country
KFGE	98.1 FM	Milford	NRG License Sub, LLC	Country
KFHC	88.1 FM	Ponca	St. Gabriel Communications Ltd.	Religious
KFJS	90.1 FM	North Platte	VSS Catholic Communications, Inc.	Catholic
KFLV	89.9 FM	Wilber	Educational Media Foundation	Contemporary Christian (K-Love)
KFMT-FM	105.5 FM	Fremont	Walnut Radio, LLC	Adult contemporary
KFOR	1240 AM	Lincoln	Alpha 3E Licensee LLC	News Talk Information
KFRX	106.3 FM	Lincoln	Digity 3E License, LLC	Pop contemporary hit radio
KGBI-FM	100.7 FM	Omaha	University of Northwestern - St. Paul	Contemporary Christian
KGCO-LP	107.9 FM	Crete	Greater Crete Commercial Free Radio Corporation	Religious (Radio 74 Internationale)
KGFW	1340 AM	Kearney	NRG License Sub, LLC	News Talk Information
KGKD	90.5 FM	Columbus	The Praise Network, Inc.	Contemporary Christian
KGMT	1310 AM	Fairbury	Flood Communications of Beatrice, LLC	Oldies
KGOR	99.9 FM	Omaha	iHM Licenses, LLC	Classic hits
KGRD	105.3 FM	Orchard	The Praise Network, Inc.	Contemporary Christian
KGRU	89.5 FM	Burwell	The Praise Network, Inc.	Contemporary Christian
KGWO	89.5 FM	Ogallala	Community Broadcasting, Inc.	Christian talk and teaching
KHAQ	98.5 FM	Maxwell	Armada Media – McCook, Inc.	Classic rock
KHAS	1230 AM	Hastings	Flood Communications Tri-Cities, L.L.C.	Adult contemporary
KHNE-FM	89.1 FM	Hastings	Nebraska Educational Telecommunications	Classical
KHPJ-LP	98.3 FM	Hastings	Hope Radio Hastings	Christian
KHUB	1340 AM	Fremont	Walnut Radio, LLC	Country
KHYY	107.3 FM	Minatare	Nebraska Rural Radio Association	Classic country
KHZY	99.3 FM	Overton	My Bridge Radio	Christian Contemporary
KIBM	1490 AM	Omaha	Walnut Radio, LLC	Oldies
KIBZ	104.1 FM	Crete	Digity 3E License, LLC	Active rock
KICS	1550 AM	Hastings	Flood Communications Tri-Cities, L.L.C.	Sports (ESPN)
KICX-FM	96.1 FM	McCook	Armada Media – McCook, Inc.	Adult contemporary
KIMB	104.3 FM	Dix	Flood Communications West, LLC	Classic hits
KINI	96.1 FM	Crookston	Rosebud Sioux Tribe	Variety
KIOD	105.3 FM	McCook	Legacy Communications	Country
KIOR-LP	98.1 FM	Omaha	Independent Omaha Radio Project, Inc.	Variety
KIOS-FM	91.5 FM	Omaha	Douglas County School District 001	News Talk Information
KISO	96.1 FM	Omaha	iHM Licenses, LLC	Pop contemporary hit radio
KIVE-LP	92.5 FM	Aurora	Dawn Adventist Broadcasting	Religious (Radio 74 Internationale)
KJGS	91.9 FM	Aurora	Radio 74 Internationale	Religious (Radio 74 Internationale)
KJLT	970 AM	North Platte	Tri-State Broadcasting Association, Inc.	Religious
KJLT-FM	94.9 FM	North Platte	Tri-State Broadcasting Association	Contemporary Christian
KJSK	900 AM	Columbus	Digity 3E License, LLC	News Talk Information
KJSO-LP	101.3 FM	Omaha	North Omaha Loves Jazz Cultural Arts and Humanities Complex	Classic R&B
KJTF	89.3 FM	North Platte	Tri-State Broadcasting Association, Inc.	Christian
KJTJ-LP	107.5 FM	Sidney	St. James Catholic Church of Sidney	Catholic
KJTM-LP	107.9 FM	Lincoln	Duo Ministries	Christian Chinese
KJWM	91.5 FM	Grand Island	VSS Catholic Communications, Inc.	Catholic
KJYS	88.1 FM	McCook	Tri-State Broadcasting Association, Inc	
KJZC	90.5 FM	Chadron	Board Trustees, NE State Colleges, dba Chadron State College	
KKCD	105.9 FM	Omaha	SM-KKCD, LLC	Classic rock
KKJK	103.1 FM	Ravenna	Legacy Communications, LLC	Country
KKNL	89.3 FM	Valentine	Community Public Media	Silent
KKOP-LP	93.9 FM	Clay Center	Wildcat Broadcasting Inc	Variety
KKOT	93.5 FM	Columbus	Digity 3E License, LLC	Classic hits
KKPR-FM	98.9 FM	Kearney	Flood Communications Tri-Cities, L.L.C.	Classic hits
KLCV	88.5 FM	Lincoln	Community Broadcasting, Inc.	Religious Talk (Bott Radio Network)
KLIN	1400 AM	Lincoln	NRG License Sub, LLC	News Talk Information
KLIQ	94.5 FM	Hastings	Flood Communications of Omaha, L.L.C.	Regional Mexican
KLIR	101.1 FM	Columbus	Digity 3E License, LLC	Adult contemporary
KLJV	88.3 FM	Scottsbluff	Educational Media Foundation	Contemporary Christian (K-Love)
KLNB	88.3 FM	Grand Island	Educational Media Foundation	Contemporary Christian (K-Love)
KLNC	105.3 FM	Lincoln	NRG License Sub, LLC	Classic rock
KLNE-FM	88.7 FM	Lexington	Nebraska Educational Telecommunications	Classical
KLPH-LP	103.9 FM	Alliance	St. Maximillian Kolbe Catholic Radio of Alliance	Catholic
KLPR	91.1 FM	Kearney	KLPR-FM, University of Nebraska at Kearney	Alternative
KLZA	101.3 FM	Falls City	KNZA, Inc.	Adult contemporary
KMAY-LP	102.5 FM	York	St. Mary Catholic Radio of York	Catholic
KMBV	90.7 FM	Valentine	My Bridge Radio	Christian Contemporary
KMCX-FM	106.5 FM	Ogallala	iHM Licenses, LLC	Country
KMKP-LP	106.5 FM	Holdrege	St. John Bosco Catholic Radio of Holdrege	Catholic
KMLV	88.1 FM	Ralston	Educational Media Foundation	Contemporary Christian (K-Love)
KMMJ	750 AM	Grand Island	MyBridge	News Talk Information
KMMQ	1020 AM	Plattsmouth	Munoz Media, LLC	Regional Mexican
KMNE-FM	90.3 FM	Bassett	Nebraska Educational Telecommunications	Classical
KMOR	93.3 FM	Gering	Nebraska Rural Radio Association	Classic rock
KMTY	97.7 FM	Gibbon	Legacy Communications, LLC	Active rock
KNBE	88.9 FM	Beatrice	Family Worship Center Church, Inc.	Religious
KNCY	1600 AM	Nebraska City	Flood Broadcasting, Inc.	Classic country
KNEB	960 AM	Scottsbluff	Nebraska Rural Radio Association	Country
KNEB-FM	94.1 FM	Scottsbluff	Nebraska Rural Radio Association	Country
KNEF	90.1 FM	Franklin	CSN International	Christian
KNEN	94.7 FM	Norfolk	Red Beacon Communications, LLC	Classic rock
KNEY-LP	100.9 FM	Kearney	Kearney SDA Radio	Religious Teaching
KNFA	90.7 FM	Grand Island	Family Worship Center Church, Inc.	Religious
KNGN	1360 AM	McCook	My Bridge	Religious
KNIL-LP	95.9 FM	Creighton	St. Ludgerus Catholic Church	Catholic
KNKP-LP	104.3 FM	Imperial	St. Polycarp Catholic Radio of Imperial	Catholic
KNLV	1060 AM	Ord	MWB Broadcasting II, LLC	Oldies
KNLV-FM	103.9 FM	Ord	MWB Broadcasting II, LLC	Country
KNNA-LP	95.7 FM	Lincoln	Good Shepherd Community Radio	Religious Teaching
KNPQ	107.3 FM	Hershey	Eagle Communications, Inc.	Classic country
KNTK	93.7 FM	Firth	BDP Communications LLC	Sports (ISN)
KOBM-FM	97.3 FM	Blair	Walnut Radio, LLC	Oldies
KODY	1240 AM	North Platte	Armada Media – McCook, Inc.	News Talk Information
KOGA	930 AM	Ogallala	iHM Licenses, LLC	Classic country
KOGA-FM	99.7 FM	Ogallala	iHM Licenses, LLC	Classic hits
KOIL	1290 AM	Omaha	NRG License Sub, LLC	News Talk Information
KOLB	88.3 FM	Hartington	VSS Catholic Communications, Inc.	Catholic
KOLT	690 AM	Terrytown	Nebraska Rural Radio Association	News Talk Information
KOOO	101.9 FM	La Vista	Nebraska Public Media	Public radio
KOOQ	1410 AM	North Platte	Eagle Communications	Classic hits
KOOW-LP	95.1 FM	Central City	Central City Baptist Church	Religious Teaching
KOPW	106.9 FM	Plattsmouth	NRG License Sub, L.L.C.	Country
KOWN-LP	95.7 FM	Omaha	Omaha Community Broadcasting	Urban contemporary
KOZN	1620 AM	Bellevue	NRG License Sub, LLC	Sports (FSR)
KOZY-FM	101.3 FM	Bridgeport	Nebraska Rural Radio Association	Pop contemporary hit radio
KPKA-LP	100.1 FM	Beatrice	St. Isadore Catholic Radio of Beatrice	Catholic
KPNE-FM	91.7 FM	North Platte	Nebraska Educational Telecommunications	Classical
KPNO	90.9 FM	Norfolk	The Praise Network, Inc.	Contemporary Inspirational
KPNY	102.3 FM	Alliance	My Bridge Radio	Christian Contemporary
KQCH	94.1 FM	Omaha	SM-KQCH, LLC	Pop contemporary hit radio
KQHK	103.9 FM	McCook	Armada Media – McCook, Inc.	Classic rock
KQIQ	88.3 FM	Beatrice	My Bridge Radio	Christian Contemporary
KQKX	106.7 FM	Norfolk	WJAG Incorporated	Country
KQKY	105.9 FM	Kearney	NRG License Sub, LLC	Pop contemporary hit radio
KQPK-LP	96.9 FM	McCook	Holy Spirit Catholic Radio of McCook	Catholic
KQQA	90.5 FM	Shelton	Radio 74 Internationale	Religious (Radio 74 Internationale)
KQQO-LP	97.7 FM	Ogallala	Adventist Learning Center of Ogallala	Religious (Radio 74 Internationale)
KQSI-LP	89.5 FM	Sidney	Adventist Learning Center of Sidney	Religious (Radio 74 Internationale)
KQSK	97.5 FM	Chadron	Eagle Communications	Country
KRFS	1600 AM	Superior	CK Broadcasting, Inc.	Adult contemporary
KRFS-FM	103.9 FM	Superior	CK Broadcasting, Inc.	Country
KRGI	1430 AM	Grand Island	Legacy Communications	News Talk Information
KRGI-FM	96.5 FM	Grand Island	Legacy Communications	Country
KRGY	97.3 FM	Aurora	Legacy Communications	Classic rock
KRKR	95.1 FM	Lincoln	My Bridge Radio	Christian Contemporary
KRNE-FM	91.5 FM	Merriman	Nebraska Educational Telecommunications	Classical
KRNP	100.7 FM	Sutherland	Eagle Communications, Inc.	Classic rock
KRNU	90.3 FM	Lincoln	University of Nebraska	Alternative
KRNY	102.3 FM	Kearney	NRG License Sub, LLC	Country
KROA	95.7 FM	Grand Island	My Bridge Radio	Christian Contemporary
KROR	101.5 FM	Hastings	NRG License Sub, LLC	Classic rock
KRVN	880 AM	Lexington	Nebraska Rural Radio Association	News Talk Information
KRVN-FM	93.1 FM	Lexington	Nebraska Rural Radio Association	Country
KSDZ	95.5 FM	Gordon	DJ Broadcasting, Inc.	Country
KSFT-FM	107.1 FM	South Sioux City	iHM Licenses, LLC	Pop contemporary hit radio
KSID	1340 AM	Sidney	Flood Communications West, LLC	Classic country
KSID-FM	98.7 FM	Sidney	Flood Communications West, LLC	Country
KSRZ	104.5 FM	Omaha	SM-KSRZ-FM, LLC	Adult contemporary
KSSH	91.7 FM	Shubert	My Bridge Radio	Christian Contemporary
KSUX	105.7 FM	Winnebago	KSUX/KSCJ Radio Broadcasting Co	Country
KSWN	93.9 FM	McCook	Legacy Communications	Pop contemporary hit radio
KSYZ-FM	107.7 FM	Grand Island	NRG License Sub, LLC	Adult contemporary
KTCH	104.9 FM	Emerson	Wayne Radio Works LLC	Country
KTGL	92.9 FM	Beatrice	Digity 3E License, LLC	Classic rock
KTIC	840 AM	West Point	Nebraska Rural Radio Association	Country
KTIC-FM	107.9 FM	West Point	Nebraska Rural Radio Association	Country
KTLX	91.3 FM	Columbus	TLC Educational Corporation	Educational
KTMX	104.9 FM	York	Nebraska Rural Radio Association	Country
KTNC	1230 AM	Falls City	KNZA Inc.	Oldies
KTNE-FM	91.1 FM	Alliance	Nebraska Educational Telecommunications	Classical
KTTT	1510 AM	Columbus	Digity 3E License, LLC	News Talk Information
KUCV	91.1 FM	Lincoln	Nebraska Educational Telecommunications	Classical
KUSO	92.7 FM	Albion	Flood Communications, L.L.C.	Country
KUTT	99.5 FM	Fairbury	Flood Communications of Beatrice, LLC	Country
KUVR	1380 AM	Holdrege	Nebraska Rural Radio Association	Classic hits
KVLD	91.7 FM	Norfolk	Educational Media Foundation	Contemporary Christian (K-Love)
KVNO	90.7 FM	Omaha	The Board of Regents of the University of Nebraska	Classical
KVSH	940 AM	Valentine	Heart City Radio Company	Full service
KVSS	102.7 FM	Papillion	VSS Catholic Communications, Inc.	Religious
KWBE	1450 AM	Beatrice	Flood Communications of Beatrice, LLC	Talk
KWSC	91.9 FM	Wayne	Wayne State College	Alternative
KWTN	100.9 FM	Allen	Winnebago Tribe of Nebraska	Silent
KXCB	1420 AM	Omaha	Hickory Radio, LLC	Country
KXNB-LP	101.3 FM	Omaha	Malcolm X Memorial Foundation	Classic R&B
KXNE-FM	89.3 FM	Norfolk	Nebraska Educational Telecommunications	Classical
KXNG	91.3 FM	Lexington	MyBridge, DBA as MyBridge Radio	Christian contemporary
KXNP	103.5 FM	North Platte	Armada Media – McCook, Inc.	Country
KXPN	1460 AM	Kearney	Flood Communications Tri-Cities, L.L.C.	Sports (ESPN)
KYBF	90.1 FM	Scottsbluff	Bible Broadcasting Network, Inc.	Conservative religious (Bible Broadcasting Network)
KYFG	88.9 FM	Omaha	Bible Broadcasting Network, Inc.	Conservative religious (Bible Broadcasting Network)
KYHK	89.5 FM	Kearney	Bible Broadcasting Network, Inc.	Conservative religious (Bible Broadcasting Network)
KYTF-LP	94.7 FM	Blair	Blair Healing Rooms Inc	Community
KZEN	100.3 FM	Central City	Digity 3E License, LLC	Country
KZKX	96.9 FM	Seward	Digity 3E License, LLC	Country
KZLW	90.1 FM	Gretna	My Bridge	Christian Contemporary
KZMC	102.1 FM	McCook	Legacy Communications	Classic country
KZOI	1250 AM	Dakota City	La Fiesta 971, LLC	Regional Mexican
KZOT	1180 AM	Bellevue	NRG License Sub, LLC	Yacht rock
KZTL	93.5 FM	Paxton	Eagle Communications, Inc.	Country
KZUM	89.3 FM	Lincoln	Sunrise Communications, Inc.	Variety
KZYK	88.9 FM	Santee	Nebraska Indian Community College	Variety
WCGD-LP	90.5 FM	Edgar	Central Nebraska Community Broadcasting	Christian
WJAG	780 AM	Norfolk	WJAG, Inc.	News Talk Information
WOW	590 AM	Omaha	Walnut Radio, LLC.	Sports (ESPN)

== Defunct ==
- KFKX
- KIMB
- KLMS
