= Mass media in Scottsbluff, Nebraska =

Scottsbluff, Nebraska is a center of media in the Nebraska Panhandle. The following is a list of media outlets in the city.

== Print ==
=== Newspapers ===
The Scottsbluff Star Herald is the city's primary newspaper, published six days a week. In addition, News Media Corporation publishes the Business Farmer, a weekly agribusiness paper.

The Scottsbluff Republican was a major newspaper published in Scottsbluff from 1900–1964.

== Radio ==
The following is a list of radio stations licensed to and/or broadcasting from Scottsbluff:

=== AM ===
Frequency	Callsign	Format	City of License	Notes
690	KOLT	Classic Country	Terrytown, Nebraska	Broadcasts from Scottsbluff
960	KNEB	News/Talk	Scottsbluff, Nebraska	-

=== FM ===
Frequency	Callsign	Format	City of License	Notes
88.3	KLJV	Christian Contemporary	Scottsbluff, Nebraska	K-LOVE
89.1	KDAI	Christian Contemporary	Scottsbluff, Nebraska	Air 1
89.5	K208CK	Religious	Scottsbluff, Nebraska	BBN; Translator of WYFQ, Wadesboro, North Carolina
90.3	K212EJ	Religious	Scottsbluff, Nebraska	CSN; Translator of KAWZ, Twin Falls, Idaho
91.5	K218DL	Religious	Scottsbluff, Nebraska	Spanish language; Radio Nueva Vida
93.3	KMOR	Classic rock	Gering, Nebraska	Broadcasts from Scottsbluff
94.1	KNEB-FM	Country	Scottsbluff, Nebraska	-
97.1	KCMI	Religious	Terrytown, Nebraska	Broadcasts from Scottsbluff
99.3	KETT	Adult Contemporary	Mitchell, Nebraska	Broadcasts from Scottsbluff
101.3	KOZY-FM	Top 40	Bridgeport, Nebraska	Broadcasts from Scottsbluff
107.3	KHYY	Country	Minatare, Nebraska	Broadcasts from Scottsbluff

== Television ==
Scottsbluff is located in the Cheyenne, Wyoming television market.

Bridgeport and Morill County are located in the Rapid City, South Dakota television market, while the rest of the panhandle are served by Denver.

The following is a list of television stations that broadcast from and/or are licensed to the city.

Display Channel	Network	Callsign	City of License	Notes
4.2	NBC	KNEP	Sidney, Nebraska	Satellite station of KNOP-TV, North Platte, Nebraska
10.1	CBS	KSTF	Scottsbluff, Nebraska	Satellite station of KGWN-TV, Cheyenne, Wyoming
13.1	PBS/NET	KTNE	Alliance, Nebraska	
