= KOLT (1320 AM) =

Radio station in Scottsbluff, Nebraska, U.S.

Scottsbluff, Nebraska; United States
- Frequency: 1320 kHz

Ownership
- Owner: Hometown Family Radio; (Legacy Communications, LLC)
- Sister stations: KOLT, KMOR, KHYY, KOZY, KETT

History
- First air date: February 16, 1930
- Last air date: November 1, 2019
- Former call signs: KGKY (1930–1947); KOLT (1947–2019); KOAQ (2019–2020, station off air)

Technical information
- Facility ID: 67471
- Class: B
- Power: 5,000 watts day; 1,000 watts night
- Transmitter coordinates: 41°51′50″N 103°42′24″W

KOLT (1320 AM) was a radio station in Scottsbluff, Nebraska, United States, which operated from 1930 to 2019. It was last owned by Legacy Broadcasting, also known as Hometown Family Radio, and carried a talk radio format.

KOLT was the oldest radio station in Scottsbluff, signing on as KGKY in 1930 before becoming KOLT in 1947. It was owned by the Hilliard family for the first 52 years of its existence and grew from a 100-watt outlet to a 5,000-watt station; it was credited as the first station in Nebraska to broadcast local news. When the Hilliards retired from broadcasting in 1982, they sold the station to a group of its employees. However, KOLT struggled financially, leading to a legal dispute and its closure in June 1989.

Michael Tracy bought the station out of foreclosure and receivership and obtained a waiver from the Federal Communications Commission to create the first group of three radio stations commonly owned in the same market. KOLT returned to the air in 1992 and served primarily as a talk radio station. When the Nebraska Rural Radio Association acquired Legacy Broadcasting's other local stations in 2019, KOLT was excluded from the sale to meet ownership limitations, and its programming and format were moved to the former KOAQ, now KOLT, at 690 kHz. No buyer was identified for the license, which was surrendered.

== History ==
=== Hilliard Company ownership ===
Ruth and L. L. Hilliard and Adolph E. Martischewsky incorporated the Hilliard Company as a seller of radio instruments in Scottsbluff in February 1929. Briefly, the company operated a station without any authorization, but this soon came to an end. That November, the Federal Radio Commission, forerunner to the Federal Communications Commission (FCC), granted the Hilliard Company a construction permit for a new 100-watt radio station on 1500 kHz after previously denying an earlier request. KGKY was put into operation on February 16, 1930, and was dedicated with a daylong program on February 21. The station was located on 1713 Broadway but moved to 1617 Broadway the next year. During the 1930s, the station was approved to increase its daytime power to 250 watts (in 1935) and to make a matching increase in nighttime power (in 1939). in addition, it pioneered local news broadcasting on the radio in Nebraska. In conjunction with the radio reallocation of NARBA, KGKY and other stations on 1500 kHz moved to 1490 kHz on March 29, 1941. It became an affiliate of CBS on January 1, 1945.

KOLT also rendered important public service efforts. The station was credited with pioneering local news broadcasting on the radio in Nebraska, beginning in the 1930s. After a major blizzard paralyzed the region in 1949, KOLT remained on the air as one of the few sources of communication standing, and it chartered an aircraft that searched for stranded motorists and rescued a couple who had been stuck in their car for four days.

Hilliard had been seeking more memorable and easier-to-read call letters for KGKY for some time. He thought of KOLT, but when he inquired, the call sign was found to be at use on a ship at sea. Later, a friend informed Hilliard that the ship had sunk, making the call letters available for release. In February 1945, Hilliard applied to the FCC to move KGKY to 1320 kHz with 1,000 watts, of which the commission approved the next year. The call sign change to KOLT coincided with the frequency switch, carried out on February 6, 1947. In April 1949, the station increased its daytime power to 5,000 watts.

The station's programming evolved over time to shift away from music and toward talk programming; in 1955, it moved to new studios in Scottsbluff. The move was delayed enough that the heat had been turned off in the old studio, forcing announcers to deal with cold temperatures while on the air. KOLT attempted to enter television by partnering with KCOW in Alliance to form Western Nebraska Television, Inc., to build a station on channel 13 there. The FCC granted the construction permit, but Frontier Broadcasting Company, owner of KSTF in Scottsbluff, protested the award and was successful in having a federal appeals court overturn the grant. Citing continued expenses, the company abandoned its pursuit of the channel and dissolved in June 1959.

=== After Hilliard ===
In 1982, Les Hilliard retired from broadcasting after more than five decades, and the Hilliard Company sold the station to a group of several employees, preferring not to market it for sale to other bidders. The consortium, which included Verl "Red" Davis and others, took over on January 1, 1983.

However, the Davis-led group struggled with the station's finances. In 1987, two of Les Hilliard's sons, William and Leslie, filed to have the station returned to them for nonpayment; of the $705,000 purchase price, $615,000 remained owing (equivalent to $1.95 million and $1.7 million, respectively, in 2024). In January 1989, a Scotts Bluff County judge ruled that the owners had to pay a mortgage on the property or it would be foreclosed upon. The other local owners surrendered their stock to the Hilliards, and KOLT went silent on the evening of June 30, 1989.

=== KOLT after ===
In December 1989, a receiver was appointed for the station, which was sold along with its assets and associated land to Michael Tracy and his Tracy Corporation. Tracy owned KMOR (93.3 FM) in Scottsbluff as well as KOAQ (690 AM) in Terrytown; he needed a waiver to own the station because its signal contour overlapped with KOAQ. In addition, Tracy bought the land at a separate foreclosure sale to prevent the towers from being taken down. The owner of KNEB and KNEB-FM petitioned to deny the request, telling the FCC that the local advertising market could not sustain the return of KOLT and asking, "Why resurrect a dead dog?" The FCC granted Tracy the waiver, and the station returned to the air in May 1992, adopting much the same format it had prior to 1989: country music with regular local news and farm features, as well as The Rush Limbaugh Show and Talknet. Several former KOLT employees returned to the revived station. The creation of the first effective cluster of two AM and one FM stations, shortly before radio ownership rules were liberalized, also attracted national attention: Tracy told Radio & Records that the addition of the new country-and-talk station brought new advertising dollars into his operation. The station also had weekend Spanish-language programs for a time; this was discontinued in 1996, leaving KOLT a news-talk station seven days a week.

Tracy sold his four Scottsbluff-Gering stations to Hometown Family Radio (also known as Legacy Broadcasting), which owned stations in other cities in western and central Nebraska, in 2007. In May 2013, Armada Media and Legacy Broadcasting traded some stations in Nebraska. Legacy acquired KOLT and its sisters alongside stations in the Scottsbluff and North Platte areas, while Armada purchased two stations in Holdrege from Legacy. KOLT remained a talk radio outlet as of 2019, with Limbaugh and Sean Hannity among its major programs.

In 2019, the Nebraska Rural Radio Association bought five of Legacy's seven stations in western Nebraska for $1.75 million (equivalent to $2.15 million in 2024). It already owned an AM and an FM station—KNEB-AM-FM—which meant it could not acquire one of the AMs and one of the FMs owned by Legacy. Excluded from a local marketing agreement to take over operations of the cluster were KETT and KOLT. KOAQ, which broadcast a classic country format, was consolidated with a subchannel of KNEB-FM and moved to KHYY. KOLT's format and call letters then moved to the former KOAQ at 690. The Nebraska Rural Radio Association vowed to find buyers for KETT and 1320 (now with the KOAQ call sign) or surrender their facilities. The license for 1320 was surrendered on January 17, 2020.

The Federal Communications Commission cancelled the station’s license on January 21, 2020.
