= Nebraska Rural Radio Association =

Radio broadcast network in Nebraska, United States

The Nebraska Rural Radio Association is a radio broadcast network in the U.S. state of Nebraska. It was formed in 1948 with the goal of bringing information to farmers and ranchers in the state, including daily grain and livestock markets, weather and farm reports. Its first station, KRVN (AM), was started in 1951.

Severe blizzards in Nebraska in 1948-49 had resulted in deaths and serious damage to herds and crops across the state. One of the reasons cited for the massive loss of life, crops, and livestock was a lack of timely news and weather sources for farmers. More than 4,000 shares (at $10 each) were sold under the auspices of the Nebraska Cooperative Council, Nebraska Farm Bureau, Nebraska Farmers Union, and the state Grange. The network is still owned and operated by a cooperative of farmers and ranchers. Founder Max Brown ran the network until 1979 and was succeeded by his son Eric Brown, who served until 2012.

In November 2019, the association purchased a group of stations -- six in Scottsbluff and one in Holdrege -- from Legacy Communications. It then resold one of the Scottsbluff stations, KETT, to VSS Catholic Communications. With that purchase, the network now owns 15 stations across the state, as well as four additional affiliates.

== Stations ==
=== Network owned stations ===
Cozad, Nebraska

- KAMI

Lexington, Nebraska

- KRVN
- KRVN-FM

Scottsbluff, Nebraska

- KNEB and KNEB-FM
- KMOR
- KOZY
- KHYY
- KOAQ (AM)
- KOLT (AM)

West Point, Nebraska

- KTIC
- KTIC-FM

York, Nebraska

- KAWL
- KTMX

Holdrege, Nebraska

- KUVR

Broken Bow, Nebraska

- KBRY

=== Affiliates ===
Chadron, Nebraska - owned by Chadrad Communications

- KCSR
- KBPY

Nebraska City, Nebraska - owned by Mike Flood through licensee Flood Broadcasting, Inc.

- KNCY
- KBIE

Beatrice, Nebraska - owned by Mike Flood through licensee Flood Communications of Beatrice, LLC

- KWBE

Fairbury, Nebraska - same as Beatrice

- KUTT

Sidney, Nebraska - owned by Mike Flood and Andy Ruback through licensee Flood Communications West, LLC

- KSID
