= KNLV =

KNLV may refer to:

- KNLV (AM), a radio station (1060 AM) licensed to Ord, Nebraska, United States
- KNLV-FM, a radio station (103.9 FM) licensed to Ord, Nebraska, United States
