= KOAQ =

KOAQ may refer to:

- KOAQ (FM), formerly a Top 40 radio station in Denver, Colorado known as Q103 from 1974 until January 1989 when the station was rebranded as 103-5 The Fox, adopting a classic rock format.
- KOLT (AM), a radio station (690 AM) licensed to serve Terrytown, Nebraska, which held the call sign KOAQ from 1989 to 2019
- KOLT (1320 AM), a defunct radio station licensed to serve Scottsbluff, Nebraska, United States, which held the call sign KOAQ while silent from 2019 to 2020
