= KNCY =

KNCY may refer to:

- KNCY (AM), a radio station (1600 AM) licensed to Nebraska City, Nebraska, United States
- KBIE, a radio station (103.1 FM) licensed to Auburn, Nebraska, which held the call sign KNCY-FM from 1995 to 2014
