= KVSS =

KVSS may refer to:

- KVSS (FM), a radio station (102.7 FM) licensed to serve Papillion, Nebraska, United States
- KVSS-LP, a defunct low-power television station (channel 67) formerly licensed to serve Omaha, Nebraska
- KYFG, a radio station (88.9 FM) licensed to serve Omaha, Nebraska, which held the call sign KVSS from February 1999 to June 2009
