= KSID =

KSID may refer to:

- KSID (AM), a radio station (1340 AM) licensed to Sidney, Nebraska, United States
- KSID-FM, a radio station (98.7 FM) licensed to Sidney, Nebraska, United States
- Kerala State Institute of Design(KSID), a state institute for designing in Kollam city, India
