= KBRX =

KBRX may refer to:

- KBRX (AM), a radio station (1350 AM) licensed to O'Neill, Nebraska, United States
- KBRX-FM, a radio station (102.9 FM) licensed to O'Neill, Nebraska, United States
