= KEJS =

KEJS may refer to:

- KEJS (FM), a radio station (88.1 FM) licensed to serve Sargent, Nebraska, United States; see List of radio stations in Nebraska
- KHLK, a radio station (104.3 FM) licensed to serve Lubbock, Texas, United States, which held the call sign KEJS from 2015 to 2019
