= KNEB =

KNEB may refer to:

- KNEB (AM), a radio station (960 AM) licensed to Scottsbluff, Nebraska, United States
- KNEB-FM, a radio station (94.1 FM) licensed to Scottsbluff, Nebraska, United States
- Kyiv, a city in Ukraine
