= KCTY =

KCTY may refer to:

- KCTY (AM), a radio station (1590 AM) licensed to serve Wayne, Nebraska, United States
- KTCH, a radio station (104.9 FM) licensed to serve Emerson, Nebraska, which held the call sign KCTY from 2007 to 2014
- KOPW, a radio station (106.9 FM) licensed to serve Plattsmouth, Nebraska, which held the call sign KCTY-FM from 1999 to 2007
- KCTY (Kansas City), a defunct television station (channel 25) formerly serving Kansas City, Missouri, United States
- The ICAO code for Cross City Airport in Cross City, Florida
