= KRFS =

KRFS may refer to:

- KRFS (AM), a radio station (1600 AM) licensed to serve Superior, Nebraska, United States
- KRFS-FM, a radio station (103.9 FM) licensed to serve Superior, Nebraska
