= KMOR =

KMOR may refer to:

- KMOR (FM), a radio station (93.3 FM) licensed to serve Gering, Nebraska, United States
- KMOR-LP, a defunct low-power television station (channel 51) formerly licensed to serve Eugene, Oregon, United States
- Morristown Regional Airport, ICAO code KMOR
