= KHZZ =

KHZZ may refer to:

- KHZZ-LP, a low-power radio station (100.1 FM) licensed to serve Hays, Kansas, United States
- KBRY, a radio station (92.3 FM) licensed to serve Sargent, Nebraska, United States, which held the call sign KHZZ from 2006 to 2013
