= Terrytown =

Terrytown is the name of several places in the United States:

- Terrytown, Louisiana
- Terrytown, Nebraska
