= Vic Marker =

American boxer

Victor Marker (February 5, 1916 – July 8, 2002) was a boxer who was born and raised in Scottsbluff, Nebraska, then moved to Casper, Wyoming later in life. Marker was a three time Midwest Golden Gloves Champion from 1937–39 at 147 lbs. Marker, according to those who knew him, was a softhearted, generous man. He was one of the best, if not the best, boxer in this part of the country and, when he teamed with "Terrible Terry", Terry Carpenter as his manager, he fought many successful bouts. Marker was Golden Gloves Champion in seven states. according to Leo Boehler, Marker's greatest accomplishment was beating Archie Moore in the Golden Glove Finals. (Archie Moore was World Light Heavyweight Champion, and later fought Floyd Patterson for the heavyweight championship of the world)
