= Scottsbluff, Nebraska =

City in Scotts Bluff County, Nebraska, United States

- City
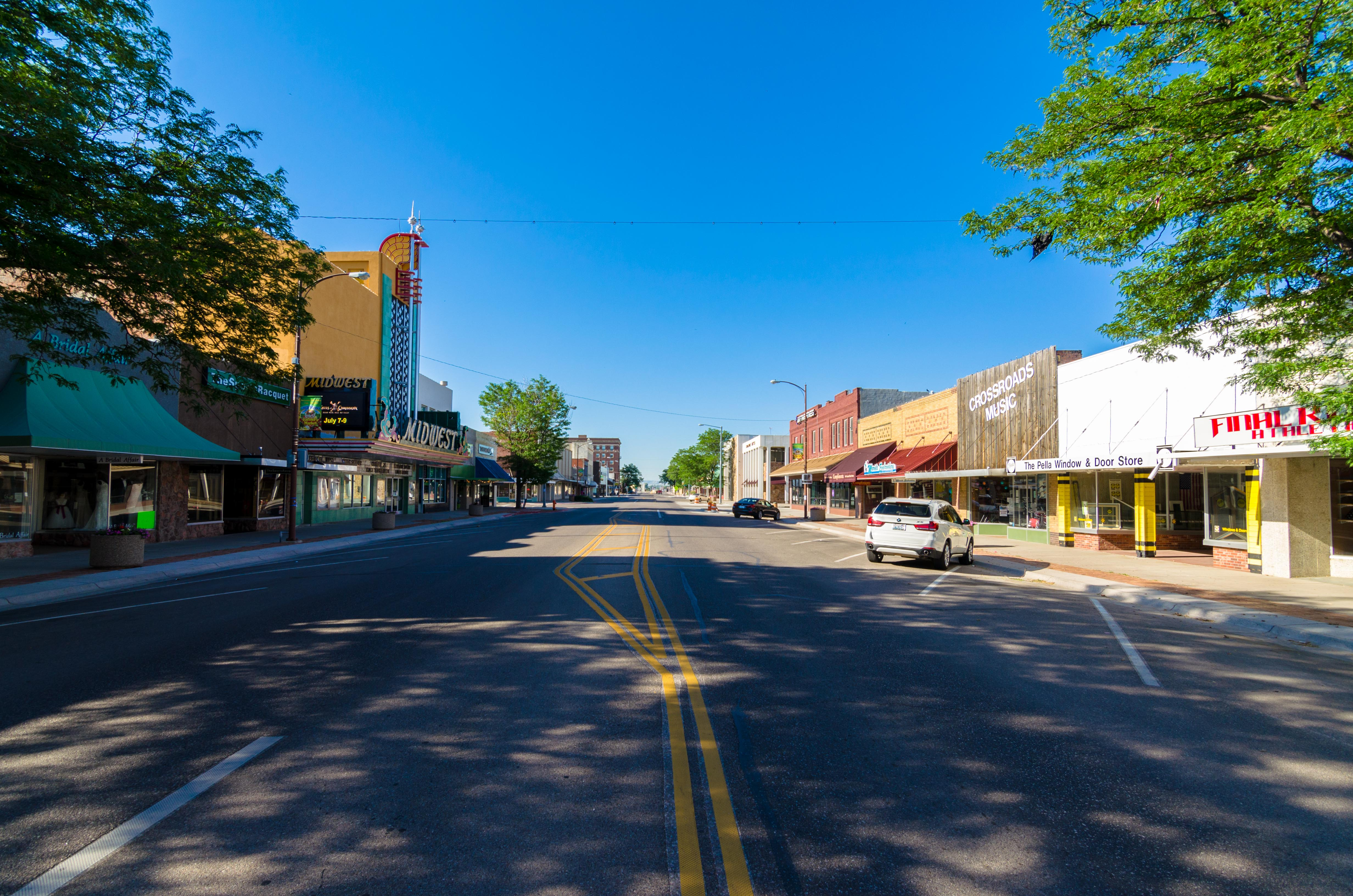
- Looking South on Broadway in Downtown Scottsbluff, July 2017

- Location of Scottsbluff, Nebraska

- Location within the United States
- Coordinates: 41°52′06″N 103°39′52″W
- Country: United States
- State: Nebraska
- County: Scotts Bluff
- Founded: 1900

Government
  - Mayor: Betsy Vidlak

Area
  - Total: 6.68 sq mi (17.30 km^{2})
  - Land: 6.63 sq mi (17.18 km^{2})
  - Water: 0.046 sq mi (0.12 km^{2})
- Elevation: 3,888 ft (1,185 m)

Population (2020)
  - Total: 14,436
  - Density: 2,176.1/sq mi (840.19/km^{2})
- Time zone: UTC−7 (Mountain (MST))
  - Summer (DST): UTC−6 (MDT)
- ZIP codes: 69361, 69363
- Area code: 308
- FIPS code: 31-44245
- GNIS feature ID: 2396559
- Website: scottsbluff.org

Scottsbluff is a city in Scotts Bluff County, Nebraska, United States, in the Great Plains region. The population was 14,436 at the 2020 census. Scottsbluff is the largest city in the Nebraska Panhandle, and the 13th-most-populous city in Nebraska.

Scottsbluff was founded in 1899 across the North Platte River from its namesake, a bluff that is now protected by the National Park Service as Scotts Bluff National Monument. The monument was named after Hiram Scott, a fur trader with the Rocky Mountain Fur Company who was found dead in the vicinity on the return trip from a fur expedition. The smaller town of Gering had been founded south of the river in 1887. The two cities have since grown together to form the 7th-largest urban area (the Scottsbluff Micropolitan Statistical Area) in Nebraska.

== History ==
Scottsbluff was founded in 1899 by the Lincoln Land Company, a subsidiary of the Burlington Railroad. By 1900, the Burlington Railroad laid tracks into the town and placed a discarded boxcar next to the tracks as a temporary depot. Scottsbluff was the first town in the region to be located along a railroad line, resulting in some older businesses relocating from Gering to Scottsbluff.

== Other names ==
In the Lakota language, Scottsbluff is called pȟaŋkéska wakpá otȟúŋwahe ("Platte River City", lit. "abalone river city").

== Geography and climate ==
According to the United States Census Bureau, the city has a total area of 6.27 square miles (16.24 km^{2}), of which 6.22 square miles (16.11 km^{2}) is land and 0.05 square miles (0.13 km^{2}) is water.

Scottsbluff has a cold semi-arid climate (Köppen: BSk), bordering on a hot-summer humid continental climate (Dfa) with wide seasonal and diurnal temperature variations, and is located in USDA Plant Hardiness Zone 5a. Summers are hot, and winters dry and cold, though chinook winds can loosen the cold's grip, often bringing temperatures above 50 °F (10 °C). The monthly daily average temperature ranges from 28.3 °F (−2.1 °C) in December to 75.3 °F (24.1 °C) in July. Over the course of a year, there is an average six afternoons with maxima 100 °F (37.8 °C) or above, 49.1 afternoons with maxima reaching at least 90 °F (32.2 °C), 27.4 afternoons with a maximum at or below the freezing mark, and 11.6 mornings with minima at or below 0 °F (−17.8 °C).

Extremes in temperature have ranged from 110 °F (43.3 °C) on July 11, 1939, down to −46 °F (−43.3 °C) on February 6, 1899, which held the record low for Nebraska for a mere week until Bridgeport recorded −47 °F or −43.9 °C. In 1989, extremes reached 109 °F (42.8 °C) and, during the December 1989 United States cold wave, −42 °F (−41.1 °C). The month of February 1962 saw temperatures as hot as 77 °F (25 °C) on the 11th and as cold as −28 °F (−33.3 °C) on the 28th.

Precipitation is heavily concentrated in the spring and summer months, with only May and June averaging over 2 inches (50.8 mm). The wettest single day has been June 7, 1953, with 3.18 inches (80.8 mm) of rain, while the wettest calendar month on record has been June 1947 with 8.33 inches (211.6 mm) and the wettest calendar year 1915 with 27.48 inches (698.0 mm). The months of November 1939 and March 2012 did not see even a trace of precipitation, while nineteen other months since 1893 have seen only a trace. The driest calendar year has been 2012 with 6.99 inches (177.5 mm). Snow typically falls in light amounts, with a 1991−2020 seasonal average of 42.5 inches or 1.1 meters; the most snow in one month has been 31.3 inches or 0.80 meters in October 2009, and the greatest depth of snow on the ground 23 inches (0.58 m) on April 14, 1927. The most snowfall in a season is 81.9 inches or 2.1 meters between July 2009 and June 2010; the least snow being 13.5 inches or 0.34 meters between July 1933 and June 1934.

Climate data for Scottsbluff, Nebraska (1991–2020 normals, extremes 1893–present)
Month	Jan	Feb	Mar	Apr	May	Jun	Jul	Aug	Sep	Oct	Nov	Dec	Year
Record high °F (°C)	74 (23)	77 (25)	92 (33)	93 (34)	103 (39)	106 (41)	110 (43)	107 (42)	105 (41)	93 (34)	81 (27)	77 (25)	110 (43)
Mean maximum °F (°C)	61.2 (16.2)	66.0 (18.9)	75.9 (24.4)	83.4 (28.6)	91.9 (33.3)	98.6 (37.0)	102.1 (38.9)	99.6 (37.6)	95.8 (35.4)	85.7 (29.8)	72.8 (22.7)	62.1 (16.7)	102.8 (39.3)
Mean daily maximum °F (°C)	41.7 (5.4)	44.6 (7.0)	54.9 (12.7)	62.3 (16.8)	71.9 (22.2)	83.9 (28.8)	90.7 (32.6)	88.8 (31.6)	79.9 (26.6)	64.9 (18.3)	51.7 (10.9)	41.6 (5.3)	64.7 (18.2)
Daily mean °F (°C)	28.3 (−2.1)	30.8 (−0.7)	39.9 (4.4)	47.5 (8.6)	57.7 (14.3)	68.7 (20.4)	75.3 (24.1)	73.0 (22.8)	63.5 (17.5)	49.3 (9.6)	37.2 (2.9)	28.0 (−2.2)	49.9 (9.9)
Mean daily minimum °F (°C)	14.9 (−9.5)	17.0 (−8.3)	25.0 (−3.9)	32.6 (0.3)	43.5 (6.4)	53.6 (12.0)	59.8 (15.4)	57.3 (14.1)	47.1 (8.4)	33.6 (0.9)	22.7 (−5.2)	14.4 (−9.8)	35.1 (1.7)
Mean minimum °F (°C)	−9.2 (−22.9)	−4.1 (−20.1)	6.9 (−13.9)	16.9 (−8.4)	28.3 (−2.1)	40.7 (4.8)	49.8 (9.9)	46.4 (8.0)	32.3 (0.2)	15.6 (−9.1)	2.3 (−16.5)	−8.4 (−22.4)	−16.1 (−26.7)
Record low °F (°C)	−33 (−36)	−46 (−43)	−27 (−33)	−8 (−22)	12 (−11)	30 (−1)	35 (2)	30 (−1)	14 (−10)	−10 (−23)	−21 (−29)	−42 (−41)	−46 (−43)
Average precipitation inches (mm)	0.39 (9.9)	0.56 (14)	1.00 (25)	1.92 (49)	2.78 (71)	2.54 (65)	1.66 (42)	1.24 (31)	1.22 (31)	1.23 (31)	0.59 (15)	0.52 (13)	15.65 (398)
Average snowfall inches (cm)	5.3 (13)	7.5 (19)	6.8 (17)	5.2 (13)	0.9 (2.3)	0.0 (0.0)	0.0 (0.0)	0.0 (0.0)	0.3 (0.76)	3.5 (8.9)	5.2 (13)	7.8 (20)	42.5 (108)
Average extreme snow depth inches (cm)	4.5 (11)	4.1 (10)	3.8 (9.7)	2.2 (5.6)	0.4 (1.0)	0.0 (0.0)	0.0 (0.0)	0.0 (0.0)	0.0 (0.0)	1.9 (4.8)	3.2 (8.1)	4.8 (12)	8.4 (21)
Average precipitation days (≥ 0.01 in)	4.7	6.3	6.9	9.4	12.1	10.7	7.7	6.7	6.7	7.0	5.3	5.2	88.7
Average snowy days (≥ 0.1 in)	4.1	5.1	3.9	2.8	0.3	0.0	0.0	0.0	0.2	1.6	3.5	4.8	26.3
Average relative humidity (%)	64.4	62.6	60.2	56.2	58.0	56.7	56.0	57.5	56.9	55.9	62.1	65.2	59.3
Source: NOAA (relative humidity 1961–1990)

== Demographics ==
Historical population
Census	Pop.	Note	%±
1910	1,746		—
1920	6,912		295.9%
1930	8,465		22.5%
1940	12,057		42.4%
1950	12,858		6.6%
1960	13,377		4.0%
1970	14,507		8.4%
1980	14,156		−2.4%
1990	13,711		−3.1%
2000	14,732		7.4%
2010	15,039		2.1%
2020	14,436		−4.0%
U.S. Decennial Census

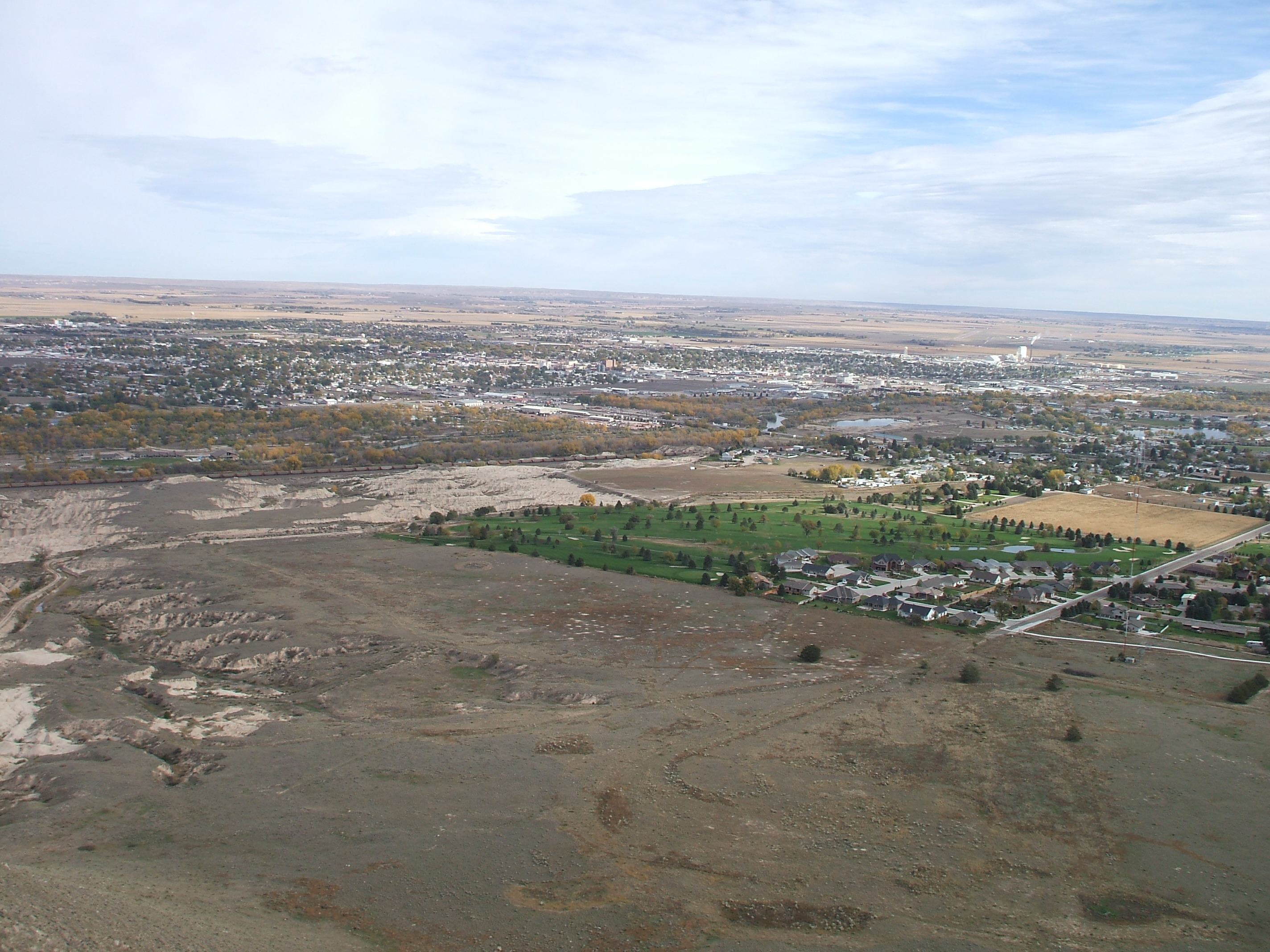
Overlooking Scottsbluff (to the left) and Gering (to the right) from Scotts Bluff National Monument

=== 2020 census ===
As of the 2020 census, Scottsbluff had a population of 14,436. The median age was 37.7 years. 25.2% of residents were under the age of 18 and 19.8% of residents were 65 years of age or older. For every 100 females there were 92.8 males, and for every 100 females age 18 and over there were 88.6 males age 18 and over.

99.9% of residents lived in urban areas, while 0.1% lived in rural areas.

There were 5,917 households in Scottsbluff, of which 29.4% had children under the age of 18 living in them. Of all households, 38.5% were married-couple households, 21.2% were households with a male householder and no spouse or partner present, and 32.8% were households with a female householder and no spouse or partner present. About 35.6% of all households were made up of individuals and 15.3% had someone living alone who was 65 years of age or older.

There were 6,757 housing units, of which 12.4% were vacant. The homeowner vacancy rate was 2.4% and the rental vacancy rate was 17.3%.

Racial composition as of the 2020 census
Race	Number	Percent
White	10,328	71.5%
Black or African American	171	1.2%
American Indian and Alaska Native	459	3.2%
Asian	160	1.1%
Native Hawaiian and Other Pacific Islander	15	0.1%
Some other race	1,483	10.3%
Two or more races	1,820	12.6%
Hispanic or Latino (of any race)	4,570	31.7%

=== Income and poverty ===
The 2016–2020 5-year American Community Survey estimates show that the median household income was $49,182 (with a margin of error of +/- $4,570) and the median family income $61,381 (+/- $7,457). Males had a median income of $34,432 (+/- $4,668) versus $28,093 (+/- $2,212) for females. The median income for those above 16 years old was $30,336 (+/- $1,820). Approximately, 12.4% of families and 15.9% of the population were below the poverty line, including 18.3% of those under the age of 18 and 13.5% of those ages 65 or over.

=== 2010 census ===
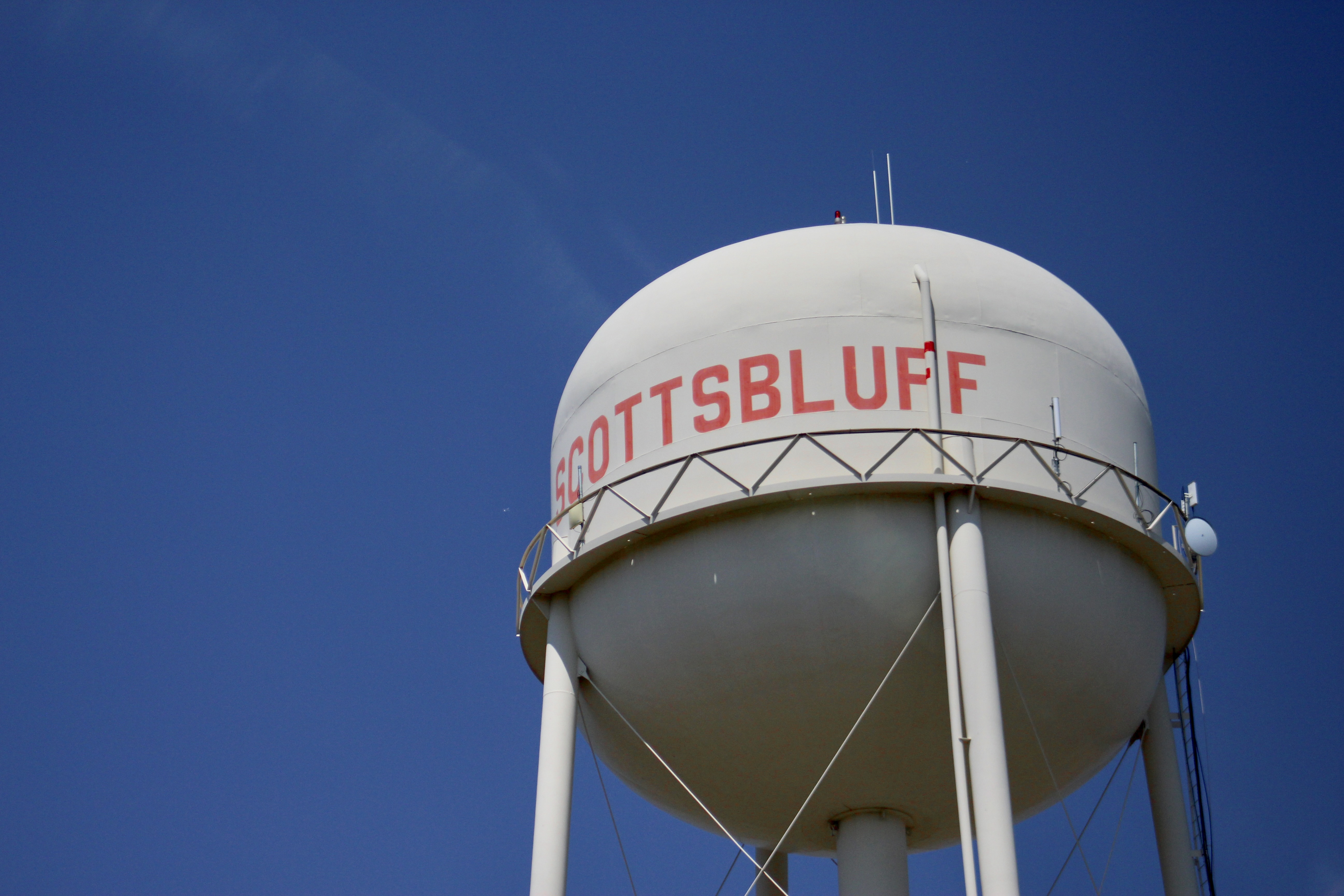
Water tower in Scottsbluff, Nebraska.

As of the census of 2010, there were 15,039 people, 6,168 households, and 3,672 families residing in the city. The population density was 2,417.8 inhabitants per square mile (933.5/km^{2}). There were 6,712 housing units at an average density of 1,079.1 per square mile (416.6/km^{2}). The racial makeup of the city was 83.0% White, 0.8% African American, 3.4% Native American, 0.8% Asian, 9.8% from other races, and 2.2% from two or more races. Hispanic or Latino of any race were 29.1% of the population.

There were 6,168 households, of which 30.5% had children under the age of 18 living with them, 41.7% were married couples living together, 12.5% had a female householder with no husband present, 5.3% had a male householder with no wife present, and 40.5% were non-families. 34.6% of all households were made up of individuals, and 14.3% had someone living alone who was 65 years of age or older. The average household size was 2.35 and the average family size was 3.04.

The median age in the city was 36 years. 24.9% of residents were under the age of 18; 10.7% were between the ages of 18 and 24; 23.8% were from 25 to 44; 23.7% were from 45 to 64; and 16.7% were 65 years of age or older. The gender makeup of the city was 47.6% male and 52.4% female.

According to a 2008 article in Quality Health entitled 10 Fattest Cities in America, 31% of Scottsbluff's population is obese, making it the 7th fattest city in America.

=== 2000 census ===
As of the 2000 census, there were 14,732 people, 6,088 households, and 3,841 families residing in the city. The population density was 2,504.5 inhabitants per square mile (967.0/km^{2}). There were 6,559 housing units at an average density of 1,115.1 per square mile (430.5/km^{2}). The racial makeup of the city was 81.88% White, 0.44% African American, 3.20% Native American, 0.75% Asian, 0.04% Pacific Islander, 11.60% from other races, and 2.10% from two or more races. Hispanic or Latino of any race were 23.59% of the population.

There were 6,088 households, out of which 30.6% had children under the age of 18 living with them, 46.7% were married couples living together, 12.9% had a female householder with no husband present, and 36.9% were non-families. 32.4% of all households were made up of individuals, and 14.7% had someone living alone who was 65 years of age or older. The average household size was 2.36 and the average family size was 2.99.

In the city, the population was spread out, with 26.5% under the age of 18, 9.8% from 18 to 24, 25.2% from 25 to 44, 20.7% from 45 to 64, and 17.8% who were 65 years of age or older. The median age was 36 years. For every 100 females, there were 87.0 males. For every 100 females age 18 and over, there were 82.1 males.

As of 2000 the median income for a household in the city was $29,938, and the median income for a family was $37,778. Males had a median income of $30,307 versus $20,854 for females. The per capita income for the city was $17,065. About 14.5% of families and 18.3% of the population were below the poverty line, including 28.5% of those under age 18 and 10.0% of those age 65 or over.

== Education ==
Scottsbluff is home to the main campus of Western Nebraska Community College. In addition, several other Nebraska institutions maintain centers and offer select courses or programs in the city, including the University of Nebraska Medical Center College of Nursing, Chadron State College, and the University of Nebraska–Lincoln Panhandle Research and Extension Center.

Scottsbluff Public Schools is the area school district.

The now-defunct Hiram Scott College was located a few miles north of the city.

== Points of interest ==
- Grave of Rebecca Winters (Mormon Pioneer)
- Lake Minatare State Recreation Area
- Riverside Discovery Center
- Western Nebraska Community College
- Fort Mitchell
- Cedar Canyon
- Carter Canyon
- Robidoux Pass
- Uptown Scotsbluff (formerly the Monument Mall)

== Landmark buildings ==
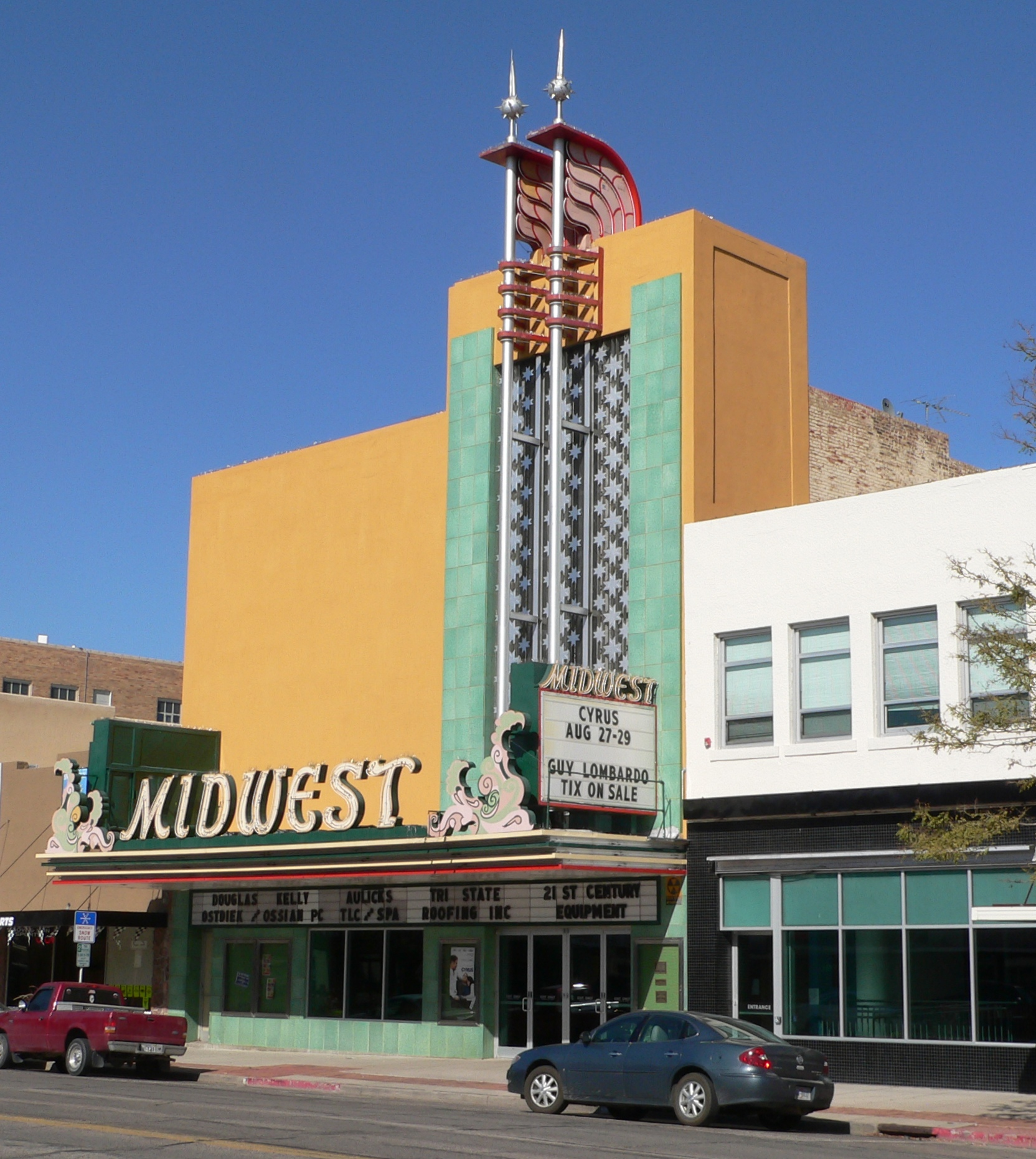
The Midwest Theater in downtown Scottsbluff is listed in the National Register of Historic Places.

- Old Post Office
- Midwest Theater
- Lincoln Hotel
- Great Western Sugar Factory
- Lake Minatare Lighthouse
- Bluffs Middle School
- Scottsbluff High School
- Scottsbluff County Courthouse
- Scottsbluff Carnegie Library
- Western Public Service Building, Powerhouse

== Media ==
Scottsbluff Radio
Frequency	Call sign	Name	Format	City of license	Ownership
690 AM	KOLT	Country Legends	Classic Country	Terrytown, Nebraska	Nebraska Rural Radio Association
960 AM	KNEB (AM)	960 Rural Radio	News/Talk	Scottsbluff, Nebraska	Nebraska Rural Radio Association
93.3 FM	KMOR	Rock of the Bluffs	Classic Rock	Gering, Nebraska	Nebraska Rural Radio Association
94.1 FM	KNEB-FM	Better Country KNEB	Country	Scottsbluff, NE	Nebraska Rural Radio Association
99.5 FM	KETT	Spirit Catholic Radio	Catholic	Mitchell, NE	VSS Communications
101.3 FM	KOZY-FM	101.3 KOZY	Top 40	Bridgeport, NE	Nebraska Rural Radio Association
105.9 FM	KAAQ	Double Q Country	Country	Alliance, NE	Eagle Communications
107.3 FM	KHYY	The Trail 107.3	Country	Minatare, NE	Nebraska Rural Radio Association

== Transportation ==
=== Public transit ===
Tri-City Roadrunner
- Headquarters: 1825 10th St, Gering, NE
- Locale: Scottsbluff, NE
- Service area: Scottsbluff, Gering, and Terrytown
- Service type: bus service, paratransit
- Routes: 2

Tri-City Roadrunner is the public transit bus system in Scottsbluff, Nebraska, United States. It operates two regular bus routes on weekdays from 6:30 a.m. to 6:30 p.m. There is no service on weekends. Two deviated fixed-route services are provided, allowing for 3/4-mile (1.2 km) deviations from the normal route. Fixed-route services began on January 10, 2018, with four buses and 14 drivers. The Blue Route and the Orange Route operate north–south between Scottsbluff and Gering, but utilize different alignments to maximize coverage of the cities. In addition to the two deviated fixed routes, there is demand response service available to anywhere in any of the cities served or rural Scotts Bluff County.

==== Fixed-route ridership ====
The ridership and service statistics shown here are of fixed-route services only and do not include demand response.

	Ridership	Change
2018	10,975	n/a
2019	12,345	▲12.48%
2020	13,778	▲11.61%

=== Major highways ===
- US 26 U.S. Route 26 - east–west route through Scottsbluff
- N-71 Nebraska Route 71 - north–south route through Scottsbluff
- N-92 Nebraska Route 92 - route going west from Scottsbluff to Wyoming border.

=== Airport ===
The Scottsbluff area is served by Western Nebraska Regional Airport. United Express serves the airport with twice-daily service to Denver International Airport.

== Notable people ==
- Hank Bauer (born 1954), former American football running back, professional television and radio broadcaster
- Brook Berringer (1973–1996), the former Nebraska quarterback was born in Scottsbluff in 1973. (His family moved to Goodland, Kansas, after his father's death.)
- Terry Carpenter (1900–1978), U.S. representative from Nebraska
- Walt Conley (1929–2003), folk singer, musician and actor
- Kip Gross (born 1964), retired Major League Baseball pitcher for the Cincinnati Reds, Los Angeles Dodgers, Boston Red Sox, and Houston Astros.
- Nik Ingersöll (born 1987), American entrepreneur and designer.
- Galen B. Jackman (born 1951), U.S. Army major general (retired), Nancy Reagan's escort throughout the state funeral proceedings of former U.S. President Ronald Reagan, first commanding general of Joint Force Headquarters National Capital Region
- Nate Lashley (born 1982), professional golfer on the PGA tour
- Jacqueline Logan (1902–1983), silent film actress; spent her childhood in Scottsbluff.
- Vic Marker (1916–2002), three-time Midwest Golden Glove boxer, who beat Archie Moore in the Golden Glove Finals in the late 1930s
- Randy Meisner (1946–2023), former bassist of the rock band the Eagles
- Adrian Smith (born 1970), U.S. representative from Nebraska
- Jack Todd (born 1946), editor and sports columnist
- Sabastian Harsh (born 2001), American football defensive end. The first graduate of Scottsbluff High School to play in the NFL.

== Sister city ==
- Bamiyan, Afghanistan

== See also ==
- List of municipalities in Nebraska
- List of bus transit systems in the United States
- 1955 Scottsbluff tornado
