= Nik Ingersoll =

American entrepreneur (born 1987)

Nik Ingersoll (Ingersöll)
- Born: November 18, 1987 (age 38); Scottsbluff, Nebraska U.S.
- Education: San Diego State University
- Occupations: Co-Founder/CMO Barnana; Co-Founder/CIO Candy Lab; Host, The Nik Ingersöll Show
- Known for: Entrepreneurship, Design, Martial Arts
- Website: ingersollnik.com

Nik Ingersoll (Ingersöll) (born Nicholas Ingersoll on November 18, 1987) is an American entrepreneur and designer best known as Co-Founder and Chief Marketing Officer of Barnana. He was born and raised in Scottsbluff, Nebraska. He has founded several other companies, including the augmented-reality company Candy Lab, and was named in the Forbes 30 Under 30 list in 2016.

== Barnana ==
Nik co-founded Barnana, an organic natural foods brand along with Caue Suplicy and Matt Clifford in 2012, where he has served as the chief marketing officer. The company aims to adopt sustainability along all verticals and is a Certified B Corp.

== Recognition ==
In 2014, Ingersoll was named one of the Top Entrepreneurs To Watch by Food Navigator. In 2018, Ingersoll won a GDUSA Design Award, A’ Design Award, and an iF International Design Forum Award.
