= KBRB =

KBRB and KBRB-FM

Ainsworth, Nebraska; United States
- Frequencies: KBRB: 1400 kHz; KBRB-FM: 92.7 MHz
- Branding: KBRB AM14 FM92

Programming
- Format: KBRB: Country; KBRB-FM: Classic hits
- Affiliations: USA Radio News; Nebraska Cornhuskers

Ownership
- Owner: Sandhills Broadcasting LLC

History
- First air date: KBRB: February 6, 1968; KBRB-FM: May 30, 1983
- Call sign meaning: Keya Paha, Brown, Rock, (Broadcasting) - The three Nebraska counties primarily covered by this station.

Technical information
- Licensing authority: FCC
- Facility ID: KBRB: 33679; KBRB-FM: 33219
- Class: KBRB: C; KBRB-FM: A
- Power: KBRB: 1,000 watts (unlimited)
- ERP: KBRB-FM: 26,000 watts
- HAAT: KBRB-FM: 101 meters (331 ft)
- Transmitter coordinates: KBRB: 42°33′16″N 99°49′52″W
- Translator(s): KBRB: 106.3 K292HE (Ainsworth)

Links
- Public license information: KBRB: Public file; LMS; KBRB-FM: Public file; LMS
- Webcast: KBRB: Listen live, KBRB-FM: Listen live
- Website: kbrbradio.com

KBRB is the call sign of two radio stations licensed in Ainsworth, Nebraska, to Sandhills Broadcasting LLC. They air a classic hits format on 92.7 FM and a country music format on 1400 AM. The AM station programming is also heard on translator K292HE, on 106.3 FM. Programming includes local news, agricultural news, USA Radio News, Nebraska Cornhuskers sports via the Husker Sports Network, local high school sports, and a variety of country and classic hits.
