= KBBN-FM =

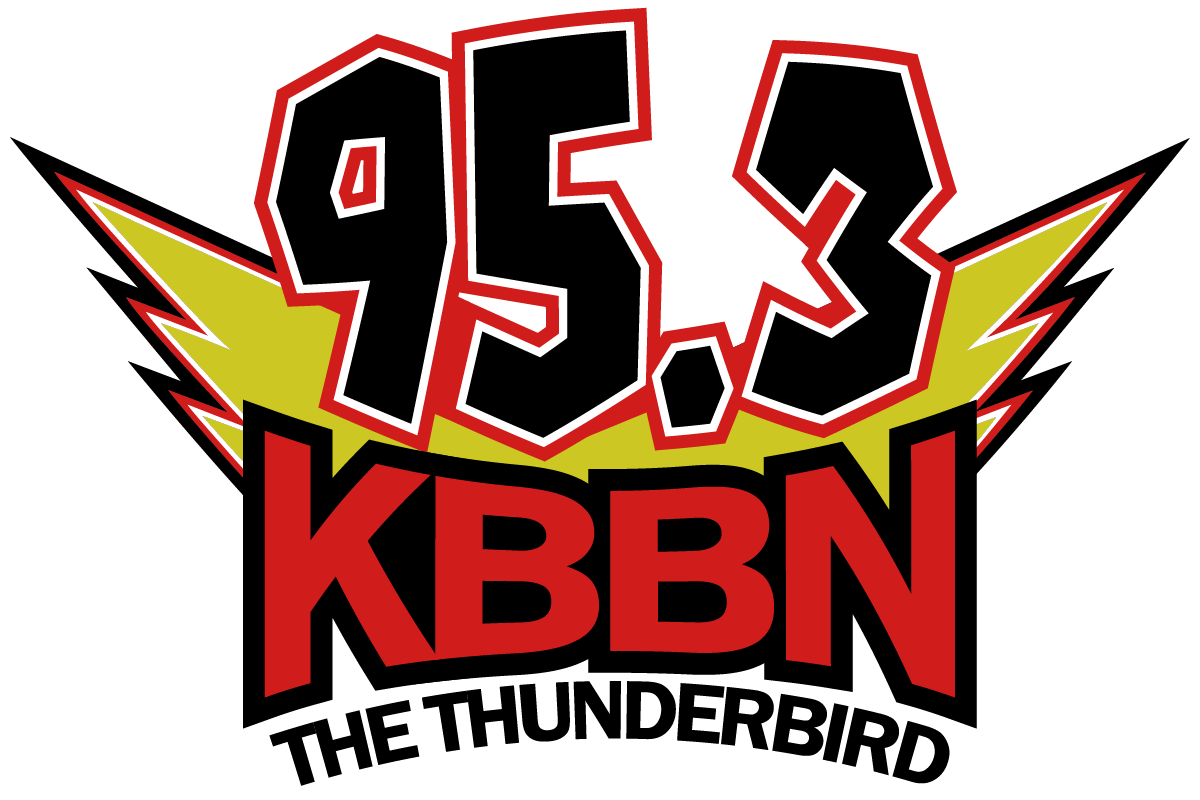
- Broken Bow, Nebraska; United States
- Frequency: 95.3 MHz
- Branding: The Thunderbird 95.3

Programming
- Format: Classic rock
- Affiliations: Westwood One, NBC Radio

Ownership
- Owner: Custer County Broadcasting Co.
- Sister stations: KCNI

History
- First air date: 1971

Technical information
- Licensing authority: FCC
- Facility ID: 14769
- Class: C2
- ERP: 30,000 watts
- HAAT: 174.9 meters
- Transmitter coordinates: 41°23′14″N 99°49′15″W

Links
- Public license information: Public file; LMS
- Webcast: Listen Live Player and Listen Live Link URL
- Website: kbbn.com

KBBN-FM (95.3 FM) is a radio station broadcasting a classic rock format. Licensed to Broken Bow, Nebraska, United States, the station is currently owned by Custer County Broadcasting Co. and features programming from Westwood One and NBC Radio.
