= KCNI =

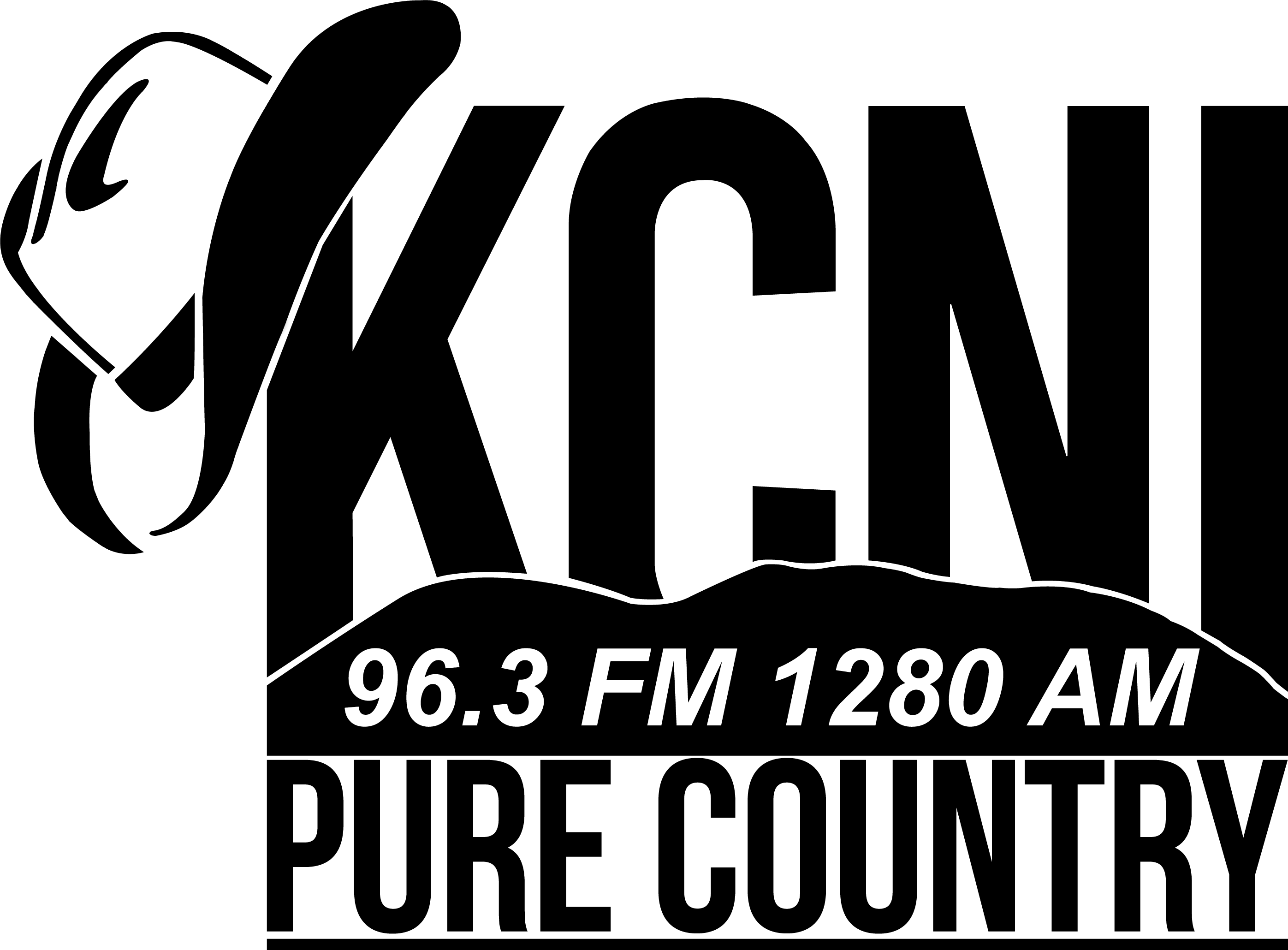
- Broken Bow, Nebraska; United States
- Frequency: 1280 kHz
- Branding: 1280 KCNI

Programming
- Format: Country music
- Affiliations: Westwood One, NBC Radio

Ownership
- Owner: Custer County Broadcasting Co.
- Sister stations: KBBN

History
- First air date: September 28, 1949
- Call sign meaning: Keeping Central Nebraska Informed

Technical information
- Licensing authority: FCC
- Facility ID: 14766
- Class: D
- Power: 1,000 watts day
- Transmitter coordinates: 41°24′31″N 99°40′28″W
- Translator: 96.3 K242CU (Broken Bow)

Links
- Public license information: Public file; LMS
- Webcast: Listen Live
- Website: KCNI Online

KCNI (1280 AM) is a radio station broadcasting a country music format. Licensed to Broken Bow, Nebraska, United States, the station is currently owned by Custer County Broadcasting Co. and features programming from Westwood One and NBC Radio.

== Translators ==
Broadcast translator for KCNI
Call sign	Frequency	City of license	FID	ERP (W)	HAAT	Class	FCC info
K242CU	96.3 FM	Broken Bow, Nebraska	142190	250	80 m (262 ft)	D	LMS
