= KAWL =

Radio station in York, Nebraska, United States

- York, Nebraska; United States
- Frequency: 1370 kHz
- Branding: Kool 103.5

Programming
- Format: Classic hits

Ownership
- Owner: Nebraska Rural Radio Association
- Sister stations: KTMX

History
- First air date: September 25, 1954

Technical information
- Licensing authority: FCC
- Facility ID: 9932
- Class: D
- Power: 500 watts (day); 176 watts (night)
- Transmitter coordinates: 40°50′34″N 97°35′17″W
- Translators: 95.9 K240FD (Ulysses); 103.5 K278CI (York)

Links
- Public license information: Public file; LMS
- Webcast: Listen live
- Website: ruralradio.com/kool

KAWL (1370 AM) is a radio station licensed to York, Nebraska, United States. Owned by the Nebraska Rural Radio Association, it broadcasts a classic hits format as "Kool 103.5".

The station went on the air on September 18, 1954, under the ownership of Mel and Tom Gleason's Prairie States Broadcasting, Inc. This station remained in the Gleason family until its sale in 2004 to Mark Jensen's MWB Broadcasting LLC. Effective April 28, 2015, the station and FM sister KTMX were sold to the Nebraska Rural Radio Association for $1.335 million.

In November 2015, the Nebraska Rural Radio Association purchased K282BE, a silent translator station at 104.3 FM in Hastings, Nebraska, and moved the station to 103.5 FM in York as K278CI. K278CI returned to the air with a classic hits format in March 2016 and KAWL, now an AM-FM combo, rebranded as "Kool 103.5".
