= KTMX =

- York, Nebraska; United States
- Frequency: 104.9 MHz (HD Radio)
- Branding: 104.9 Max Country

Programming
- Format: Country music
- Subchannels: HD2: KAWL simulcast

Ownership
- Owner: Nebraska Rural Radio Association
- Sister stations: KAWL

History
- First air date: January 6, 1971 (as KAWL-FM)
- Former call signs: KAWL-FM (1970–1991)
- Call sign meaning: "Mix" (former branding)

Technical information
- Licensing authority: FCC
- Facility ID: 9935
- Class: C2
- ERP: 13,000 watts
- HAAT: 297 meters (974 ft)
- Transmitter coordinates: 40°45′7.00″N 97°27′4.00″W

Links
- Public license information: Public file; LMS
- Webcast: Listen Live
- Website: 1049maxcountry.com/

KTMX (104.9 FM) is a radio station licensed to York, Nebraska. Owned by the Nebraska Rural Radio Association, it broadcasts a country music format branded as Max Country 104.9.

== History ==
The station went on the air as KAWL-FM on January 6, 1971. On September 23, 1991, the station changed its call sign to the current KTMX. In 2004, the station was sold to Mark Jensen's MWB Broadcasting LLC. In February 2015, it was announced that both KTMX and KAWL had been sold to the Nebraska Rural Radio Association, pending FCC approval. The sale closed effective April 28, 2015, at a price of $1.335 million. In May 2015, shortly after the closure of the purchase, the station flipped from adult contemporary to country music as 104.9 Max Country.

KTMX is home to the Concordia Bulldogs Sports Network, and provides Concordia's athletic broadcasts in Football, Volleyball and men's and women's basketball. Parker Cyza serves as the Sports Director.
