= KSDZ =

- Gordon, Nebraska; United States
- Frequency: 95.5 MHz
- Branding: The Twister

Programming
- Format: Country music

Ownership
- Owner: Flood Communications

History
- First air date: 1979

Technical information
- Licensing authority: FCC
- Facility ID: 17028
- Class: C1
- ERP: 60,000 watts
- HAAT: 95 meters (312 ft)
- Transmitter coordinates: 42°47′55.9″N 102°15′41.5″W

Links
- Public license information: Public file; LMS
- Webcast: Listen Live
- Website: KSDZ Online

KSDZ (95.5 FM) is a radio station licensed to Gordon, Nebraska, United States. The station airs a country music format and is owned by Flood Communications, Inc. KSDZ was also heard in Valentine, Nebraska, through a translator on 99.5.

Call sign	Frequency	City of license	FID	ERP (W)	HAAT	Class	Transmitter coordinates	FCC info	Notes
K258AI	99.5 FM	Valentine, Nebraska	85680	205	67 m (220 ft)	D	42°53′19.97″N 100°33′14.47″W	LMS	Went silent June 5, 2015; license canceled in 2017
