= KCMI =

- Terrytown, Nebraska; United States
- Frequency: 97.1 MHz

Programming
- Format: Christian radio

Ownership
- Owner: Christian Media Incorporated

History
- Former frequencies: 96.9 MHz (?-2016)

Technical information
- Licensing authority: FCC
- Facility ID: 11069
- Class: C1
- ERP: 100,000 watts
- HAAT: 211 meters (692 ft)
- Transmitter coordinates: 41°42′8″N 103°41′0″W
- Translator: 99.1 K256BO (Davis Ranch)

Links
- Public license information: Public file; LMS
- Webcast: Listen Live
- Website: kcmifm.org

KCMI (97.1 FM) is a radio station broadcasting a Christian radio format. KCMI is licensed to serve the community of Terrytown, Nebraska, United States. The station is currently operated under Christian Media Incorporated.

== Broadcasting ==
CMI (Christian Media Incorporated) has offices located in Scottsbluff, NE, and broadcasts on 97.1 FM, with translators 93.5 FM in Sidney and 99.1 FM in Rushville.

== Programming ==
KCMI features both Christian teaching and music. The standard music played on KCMI is worship/praise, as well as some contemporary Christian hits. The station also has special programs dedicated to music aimed towards children, Classic Christian music, hymns, Christian pop, and Christian rock. The station also carries nationally syndicated programs, such as Point of View, Focus on the Family, Haven Today, and Adventures in Odyssey.
