= KCSR =

- Chadron, Nebraska; United States
- Broadcast area: Nebraska Panhandle
- Frequency: 610 kHz C-QUAM AM stereo
- Branding: Stereo AM 610

Programming
- Language: English
- Format: Country music
- Affiliations: Fox News Radio; Nebraska Cornhuskers; United Stations Radio Networks; Westwood One Sports

Ownership
- Owner: Chadrad Communications, Inc.
- Sister stations: KBPY

History
- First air date: May 9, 1954
- Call sign meaning: "Community Service Radio"

Technical information
- Licensing authority: FCC
- Facility ID: 10081
- Class: D
- Power: 1,000 watts (day); 118 watts (night)
- Transmitter coordinates: 42°49′56″N 103°1′0″W

Links
- Public license information: Public file; LMS
- Webcast: Listen live
- Website: chadronradio.com

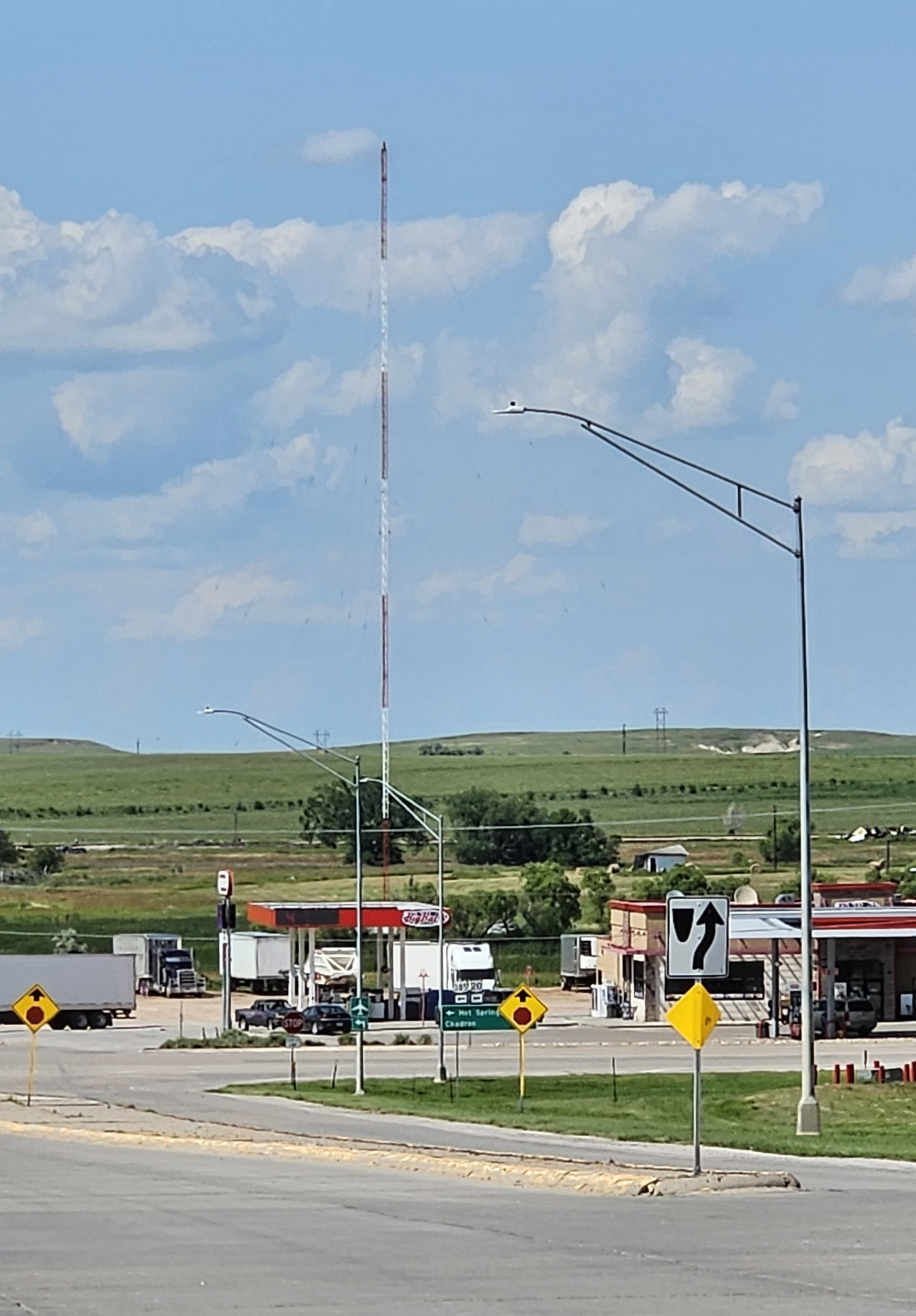
The tower for KCSR on the west edge of town

KCSR (610 kHz) is a commercial AM radio station broadcasting a country music format. Licensed to Chadron, Nebraska. The station is currently owned by Chadrad Communications, Inc. and features programming from Fox News Radio, Nebraska Cornhuskers, United Stations Radio Networks and Westwood One Sports.

KCSR first signed on the air on May 9, 1954 at a frequency of 1450 kHz with a power of 1,000 watts. The station was originally issued to Community Service Radio, which was owned by Robert Fouse and William H. Finch.

In 1963, it moved its frequency from 1450 kHz to 610 kHz, operating as a daytime-only station with 1,000 watts of power. Ownership changed again in July 1991 when Dennis and Kathleen Brown, operating as Chadrad Communications, purchased the station for $150,000.

KCSR has a long history of broadcasting Chadron State College athletics, dating back to the mid-20th century. John Axtell served as the "Voice of the Eagles" for 27 years, providing play-by-play for CSC athletics before transitioning to become the News Director at KCSR.
