= KBRX (AM) =

- O'Neill, Nebraska; United States
- Frequency: 1350 kHz
- Branding: AM 1350 The Rock

Programming
- Format: Classic hits
- Affiliations: Townhall News

Ownership
- Owner: Ranchland Broadcasting Co.
- Sister stations: KBRX-FM

History
- First air date: November 1955

Technical information
- Licensing authority: FCC
- Facility ID: 55078
- Class: D
- Power: 1,000 watts day 44 watts night
- Transmitter coordinates: 42°27′34″N 98°39′23″W
- Translator: 99.9 K260DO (O'Neill)

Links
- Public license information: Public file; LMS
- Webcast: Listen Live
- Website: kbrx.com

KBRX (1350 kHz) is an AM radio station broadcasting a classic hits format licensed to O'Neill, Nebraska, United States. The station is currently owned by Ranchland Broadcasting Co. and features programming from Townhall News.

Former logo
