= KNLV (AM) =

Coordinates: 41°34′17″N 98°55′22.3″W

- Ord, Nebraska; United States
- Broadcast area: Ord and Vicinity
- Frequency: 1060 kHz
- Branding: Greatest Hits 93.9 & 1060

Programming
- Format: Oldies

Ownership
- Owner: MWB Broadcasting
- Sister stations: KNLV-FM

History
- First air date: 1965
- Call sign meaning: KNorth Loup Valley

Technical information
- Licensing authority: FCC
- Facility ID: 35247
- Class: D
- Power: 1,000 watts day 23 watts night
- Translator: 93.9 K230BR (Ord)

Links
- Public license information: Public file; LMS
- Webcast: Listen Live
- Website: knlvradio.com

KNLV (1060 kHz, branded as "Greatest Hits 93.9 & 1060") is an AM radio station licensed to serve Ord, Nebraska, broadcasting an oldies music format featuring the top-40 hits from the 1960s through 1990s. The Mighty 1060 also features farm reports, local news, weather and local high school sports play-by-play broadcasts. It is under ownership of MWB Broadcasting II.

An FM translator for KNLV is known as Greatest Hits 93.9 FM.
