= KBPY =

- Hay Springs, Nebraska; United States
- Broadcast area: Chadron, Nebraska
- Frequency: 107.7 MHz

Programming
- Format: Adult contemporary-leaning classic hits
- Affiliations: Fox News Radio

Ownership
- Owner: Chadrad Communications
- Sister stations: KCSR

History
- First air date: March 2011

Technical information
- Licensing authority: FCC
- Facility ID: 183367
- Class: C2
- ERP: 50,000 watts
- HAAT: 144 meters (472 ft)
- Transmitter coordinates: 42°44′23″N 102°41′25″W

Links
- Public license information: Public file; LMS
- Website: KBPY Online

KBPY (107.7 FM) is a radio station licensed to Hay Springs, Nebraska, United States. The station is currently owned by Chadrad Communications.
