= KBRY =

- Sargent, Nebraska; United States
- Frequency: 92.3 MHz
- Branding: K-Bear 92.3

Programming
- Format: Country
- Affiliations: Fox News Radio

Ownership
- Owner: Nebraska Rural Radio Association

History
- First air date: 2008 (as KHZZ on 92.1)
- Former call signs: KHZZ (2006–2013)
- Former frequencies: 92.1 MHz (2006–2014)
- Call sign meaning: "K-Bear"

Technical information
- Licensing authority: FCC
- Facility ID: 164308
- Class: C1
- ERP: 100,000 watts
- HAAT: 254 meters (833 ft)
- Transmitter coordinates: 41°29′53.82″N 99°25′14.71″W

Links
- Public license information: Public file; LMS
- Webcast: Listen Live
- Website: Official Website

KBRY (92.3 FM) is a radio station broadcasting a country music format. Licensed to Sargent, Nebraska, United States, the station is owned by the Nebraska Rural Radio Association.

== Construction permit ==
In October 2012, the station, then called KHZZ, applied for a U.S. Federal Communications Commission (FCC) construction permit to move to 92.3 MHz at a new transmitter site, increasing its effective radiated power to 100,000 watts and its height above average terrain to 254 meters. It also became a commercial station. The new license was issued by the FCC on July 16, 2014.
