= KRFS (AM) =

- Superior, Nebraska; United States
- Frequency: 1600 kHz
- Branding: The Variety Station

Programming
- Format: Adult contemporary

Ownership
- Owner: CK Broadcasting, Inc.
- Sister stations: KRFS-FM

History
- First air date: March 17, 1959

Technical information
- Licensing authority: FCC
- Facility ID: 64014
- Class: D
- Power: 500 watts day 44 watts night
- Transmitter coordinates: 40°01′30″N 98°04′39″W

Links
- Public license information: Public file; LMS
- Website: krfsfm.com

KRFS (1600 AM) is a radio station licensed to Superior, Nebraska, United States. The station airs an adult contemporary format and is currently owned by CK Broadcasting, Inc.
