= KTCH =

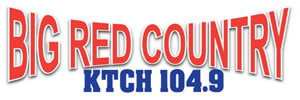
- Emerson, Nebraska; United States
- Frequency: 104.9 MHz
- Branding: Big Red Country

Programming
- Format: Country music
- Affiliations: APRN, Brownfield, Westwood One, Nebraska Radio Network

Ownership
- Owner: Wayne Radio Works, LLC
- Sister stations: KCTY

History
- First air date: October 1075
- Former call signs: KTCH-FM (1975–2007); KCTY (2007–2014)

Technical information
- Licensing authority: FCC
- Facility ID: 35659
- Class: C3
- ERP: 25,000 watts
- HAAT: 87 meters (285 ft)
- Transmitter coordinates: 42°14′4″N 97°3′20″W

Links
- Public license information: Public file; LMS
- Website: waynedailynews.com

KTCH (104.9 FM) is a radio station licensed to Emerson, Nebraska, United States. The station is owned by Wayne Radio Works, LLC.

== History ==
KTCH-FM began broadcasting in October 1975 at 104.9 MHz and a power of 3,000 watts and an antenna height of 113 feet. In 1978, the KTCH stations were sold to Dean Craun who, in 1980, received permission from the U.S. Federal Communications Commission (FCC) to increase the power on KTCH-AM to 2,500 watts - adding a second tower and creating a directional signal to protect another station on the same frequency in Boone, Iowa. Dean Craun sold the stations to Don Dolesh, a Budweiser beer distributor in Fremont, NE in 1987.

In 1997 the KTCH stations were purchased by Norfolk, Nebraska broadcaster Gene Koehn, owner of KNEN. The power of KTCH-FM was increased to 25,000 watts. After several years, Koehn sold KNEN and the KTCH stations to Waitt Media which was later acquired by NRG Media of Cedar Rapids, Iowa. During the NRG ownership, the KCTY call sign was transferred to KTCH-FM. NRG had used the KCTY call sign in Plattsmouth, Nebraska. In late 2007 KNEN and KTCH/KCTY were purchased by Mike Flood, owner of KUSO in Albion/Norfolk (aka: US-92). Flood had purchased the US-92 FCC construction permit from former West Point, Nebraska broadcaster David Kelly. That relationship paved the way for Kelly to purchase the Wayne, Nebraska stations in the spring of 2008 as Wayne Radio Works, LLC.

The call sign was switched to KTCH on February 3, 2014, consistent with a migration of programming from KTCH (AM) 1590 over to Big Red Country FM at 104.9 mHz. Concurrently, the KCTY call was moved to AM (1590) and in September 2014 was re-branded as "The City" - featuring a Classic Hits music format with increased emphasis on local news, sports, Ag programming and weather. KCTY programming is also broadcast on FM translator K255CK at 98.9 mHz with a power of 238 watts.

== Construction permit ==
On January 4, 2013, KCTY filed an application for an FCC construction permit to change the city of license from Wayne, Nebraska to Emerson and decrease the HAAT to from 92 to 87 meters. A license to cover was issued on June 18, 2013. This change had the effect of retaining the station's transmitter location in Wayne for the present time but opening the possibility that the station could serve the Sioux City, Iowa market at some future date.
