= KBRX-FM =

- O'Neill, Nebraska; United States
- Frequency: 102.9 MHz
- Branding: 102.9 KBRX

Programming
- Format: Country
- Affiliations: Townhall News

Ownership
- Owner: Ranchland Broadcasting Co., Inc.
- Sister stations: KBRX

History
- First air date: December 1973

Technical information
- Licensing authority: FCC
- Facility ID: 55077
- Class: C1
- ERP: 100,000 watts
- HAAT: 131 meters
- Transmitter coordinates: 42°26′6″N 98°33′39″W

Links
- Public license information: Public file; LMS
- Webcast: Listen Live
- Website: kbrx.com

KBRX-FM (102.9 MHz) is a radio station broadcasting a country music format. Licensed to O'Neill, Nebraska, United States, the station is currently owned by Ranchland Broadcasting Co., Inc. and features programming from Townhall News.

Former logo
