= KCTY (AM) =

- Wayne, Nebraska; United States
- Broadcast area: Northeast Nebraska
- Frequency: 1590 kHz
- Branding: The City

Programming
- Format: Classic hits
- Affiliations: APRN, Ag View, Westwood One, Nebraska Radio Network

Ownership
- Owner: David M Kelly, Managing Member; (Wayne Radio Works, LLC)
- Sister stations: KTCH

History
- First air date: March 18, 1968 (as KTCH)
- Former call signs: KTCH (1968–2014)

Technical information
- Licensing authority: FCC
- Facility ID: 35658
- Class: D
- Power: 2,500 watts day; 47 watts night
- Transmitter coordinates: 42°14′4″N 97°3′19″W
- Translator: 98.9 K255CK (Wayne)

Links
- Public license information: Public file; LMS
- Webcast: Listen live
- Website: waynedailynews.com

KCTY (1590 AM) is a radio station broadcasting a classic hits music format. Licensed to Wayne, Nebraska, United States, the station is owned by Wayne Radio Works LLC.

== History ==
The station went on the air as KTCH, March 18, 1968, as a 500 watt non-directional daytimer broadcasting at 1590 kHz. The station was built by M.L. (Mel) Gleason, a Nebraska broadcasters who in 1954 had also built KAWL in York, NE. In 1971, KTCH was purchased by Wyman and Willa Schnapp. The station was again sold to Ted Storck in 1974. Stork added an FM companion and KTCH-FM began broadcasting in October 1975 at 104.9 MHz with a power of 3,000 watts and an antenna height of 113 feet.

The stations were purchased in 1978 by Dean Craun who, in 1980, increased the power of KTCH-AM to 2,500 watts, adding another tower to create a directional pattern to protect a station on the same frequency in Boone, IA. The KTCH stations were sold in 1987 to Don Dolesh, a Budweiser beer distributor in Fremont. NE. In 1997, KTCH-AM and KTCH-FM were purchased by Gene Koehn, owner of KNEN in Norfolk, NE. During Koehn's ownership the power of KTCH-FM was increased to 25,000 watts.

Waitt Media purchased the stations on January 13, 2003. Waitt Media was acquired by NRG Media of Cedar Rapids, IA on December 28, 2005. During that ownership, NRG moved the KCTY call sign to KTCH-FM after reprogramming their FM station in Plattsmouth, NE. In 2007, KTCH-AM and KCTY-FM were purchased by Mike Flood, owner of KUSO (Albion, NE) as part of his purchase of KNEN in Norfolk. In February 2008, Flood sold the Wayne stations to veteran broadcaster David Kelly who had put KWPN (now KTIC) in West Point, NE on the air in 1985.

At the time of Kelly's purchase, KTCH-AM was programming Classic Country and KCTY-FM was programming Oldies. Kelly moved the FM format to Adult Hits under the branding of Y-104. In 2012 KCTY adopted a Hot Country format and re-branded the station as Big Red Country. In February 2014, KTCH dropped its Classic Country format and the KTCH call sign was moved to FM - Big Red Country. The KCTY call sign was moved to AM whereupon the station was re-branded as "The City" featuring a Classic Hits music format as well as local news, sports, Ag and weather. On December 3, 2014, the FCC licensed FM translator K255CK to Wayne Radio Works, LLC - authorizing the duplication of KCTY programming on FM at 98.9 mHz with a power of 238 watts.
