= KNLV-FM =

Coordinates: 41.571°N 98.923°W

- Ord, Nebraska; United States
- Broadcast area: Ord and Vicinity
- Frequency: 103.9 MHz
- Branding: 103.9 KING FM

Programming
- Format: Modern Country

Ownership
- Owner: MWB Broadcasting
- Sister stations: KNLV (AM)

History
- First air date: 1981
- Call sign meaning: K North Loup Valley

Technical information
- Licensing authority: FCC
- Facility ID: 35246
- Class: C1
- ERP: 96,500 watts
- HAAT: 286 meters (938 ft)

Links
- Public license information: Public file; LMS
- Website: knlvradio.com

KNLV-FM (103.9 FM, "King FM") is a radio station licensed to serve Ord, Nebraska broadcasting a country music format . It operates on FM frequency 103.9 MHz and is under ownership of MWB Broadcasting. JJ Johnnie James handles the morning show and is the host of a Party Line program.
