= KBIE =

Radio station in Auburn, Nebraska

- Auburn, Nebraska; United States
- Broadcast area: Nebraska City-Auburn-Falls City
- Frequency: 103.1 MHz
- Branding: B103

Programming
- Format: Country
- Affiliations: Fox News Radio; United Stations Radio Networks; Westwood One

Ownership
- Owner: Mike Flood; (Flood Broadcasting, Inc.)
- Sister stations: KNCY

History
- First air date: 1981
- Former call signs: KAUB-FM (1981–1991); KCOE (1991–1995); KNCY-FM (1995–2014)

Technical information
- Licensing authority: FCC
- Facility ID: 63953
- Class: C2
- Power: 50,000 watts
- HAAT: 124 meters (407 ft)
- Transmitter coordinates: 40°27′57″N 95°45′39″W

Links
- Public license information: Public file; LMS
- Webcast: Listen live
- Website: rivercountry.newschannelnebraska.com/b103-and-otoe-county-country

KBIE (103.1 FM) is a radio station broadcasting a country music format. Licensed to Auburn, Nebraska, United States, the station serves Nebraska City, southeastern Nebraska and southwestern Iowa, but with fringe coverage in the Omaha and Lincoln areas due to partial interference from KVSS at 102.7 covering Omaha and Lincoln proper. The station is owned by Flood Broadcasting, Inc. and features programming from Westwood One.
