= KRFS-FM =

Radio station in Superior, Nebraska

- Superior, Nebraska; United States
- Frequency: 103.9 MHz
- Branding: Superior Country 104

Programming
- Format: Country

Ownership
- Owner: CK Broadcasting, Inc.
- Sister stations: KRFS (AM)

History
- First air date: February 25, 1977

Technical information
- Licensing authority: FCC
- Facility ID: 64016
- Class: C3
- ERP: 12,000 watts
- HAAT: 100 meters (330 ft)
- Transmitter coordinates: 40°06′20″N 98°06′22″W

Links
- Public license information: Public file; LMS
- Webcast: Listen live
- Website: krfsfm.com

KRFS-FM (103.9 FM) is a radio station licensed to Superior, Nebraska, United States. The station airs a country music format and is currently owned by CK Broadcasting, Inc.
