= KSID (AM) =

- Sidney, Nebraska; United States
- Frequency: 1340 kHz
- Branding: Cheyenne County Country

Programming
- Format: Classic country
- Affiliations: Fox News Radio

Ownership
- Owner: Mike Flood and Andy Ruback; (Flood Communications West, LLC)
- Sister stations: KSID-FM

Technical information
- Licensing authority: FCC
- Facility ID: 35602
- Class: C
- Power: 1,000 watts
- Transmitter coordinates: 41°7′50″N 102°58′15″W
- Translator: 95.7 K239BE (Sidney)

Links
- Public license information: Public file; LMS
- Webcast: Listen Live
- Website: Cheyenne County Country Online

KSID (1340 kHz) is an AM radio station broadcasting a classic country music format. Licensed to Sidney, Nebraska, United States, the station serves the Sidney area and is owned by Mike Flood and Andy Ruback, through licensee Flood Communications West, LLC. It features programming from Fox News Radio.

== History ==
On May 5, 2021, KSID changed their format from country to classic country, branded as "Cheyenne County Country".
