= KYFG =

- Omaha, Nebraska; United States
- Frequency: 88.9 MHz
- Branding: Bible Broadcasting Network

Programming
- Format: Christian

Ownership
- Owner: Bible Broadcasting Network, Inc.

History
- First air date: 1996
- Former call signs: KAQB (1996–1996); KNOS (1996–1999); KVSS (1999–2009)
- Call sign meaning: Keeping Your Faith Good

Technical information
- Facility ID: 50311
- Class: A
- ERP: 85 watts horiz 1,500 watts vert
- HAAT: 147 meters
- Transmitter coordinates: 41°18′47.00″N 96°0′36.00″W

Links
- Webcast: Listen Live
- Website: bbnradio.org

KYFG 88.9 FM is an Omaha, Nebraska, area radio station featuring Bible based programming from the Bible Broadcasting Network.

The station signed on as KNOS in 1997, and initially targeted Omaha's African American community with a wide-ranging urban format that included gospel music, jazz, R&B and hip-hop music, as well as talk programming. The station was sold to a Catholic group in early 1999, and flipped to religious programming.

In 2009, the then-KVSS purchased KBZR (102.7 FM) from Chapin Enterprises of Lincoln for $4.5 million. On June 1, 2009, KVSS moved the signal from Lincoln to Gretna, renting space on a tower owned by TV station KPTM. (Jim Carroll, executive director of KVSS)

On August 24, 2009, KYFG began broadcasting programming from the Bible Broadcasting Network.
