= KNCY (AM) =

- Nebraska City, Nebraska; United States
- Broadcast area: Nebraska City-Auburn-Falls City
- Frequency: 1600 kHz
- Branding: Otoe County Country

Programming
- Format: Classic country
- Affiliations: Fox News Radio; United Stations Radio Networks

Ownership
- Owner: Mike Flood; (Flood Broadcasting, Inc.)
- Sister stations: KBIE

History
- First air date: May 26, 1957
- Call sign meaning: Nebraska City

Technical information
- Licensing authority: FCC
- Facility ID: 63941
- Class: D
- Power: 500 watts day; 31 watts night
- Translator: 105.5 K288GS (Nebraska City)

Links
- Public license information: Public file; LMS
- Webcast: Listen Live
- Website: Otoe County Country Online

KNCY (1600 kHz) is an AM radio station broadcasting a classic country format. Licensed to Nebraska City, Nebraska, United States, the station serves the Omaha area. The station is currently owned by Flood Broadcasting, Inc. and features programming from Cumulus Media Networks.

KNCY is the local affiliate for the Nebraska City Pioneers (Nebraska City High School) and the Auburn Bulldogs (Auburn High School). The station carries the Omaha-based Huskers Radio Network, broadcasting Nebraska Cornhuskers football and basketball games.

== History ==
KNCY first signed on the air on May 26, 1957, under the ownership of Robert Thomas, an announcer from Lincoln, Nebraska. The station was originally licensed to Nebraska City, Nebraska, and broadcast at 1550 AM. Its original facilities included two 150-foot towers and a broadcast power of 500 watts, with daytime-only operation to avoid interference with other stations on the same frequency. In 1968, Thomas expanded his holdings by launching a co-owned FM station, KNCY-FM 103.1, which was the first FM station to broadcast in the Nebraska City area. The two stations largely simulcast local programming and news to serve the rural communities along the Missouri River.

In the late 1960s, the call letters for the AM station were briefly changed to KNCY. This was done to match the existing KNCY-FM, creating a consistent brand for the market.

In the 1970s, KNCY-AM began to transition toward a country format, featuring popular artists of the era. The station remained under Robert Thomas's ownership for over three decades, becoming a fixture in the community. In 1989, Thomas sold the stations, marking the end of the original ownership era. The AM station eventually separated from its FM counterpart. It continued to operate under various ownership groups, often pairing local classic hits and oldies programming.

On October 9, 2017, KNCY changed their format from news to classic country, branded as "Otoe County Country".
