= KSID-FM =

- Sidney, Nebraska; United States
- Frequency: 98.7 MHz
- Branding: 98.7 The Big Boy

Programming
- Format: Country
- Affiliations: Fox News Radio

Ownership
- Owner: Mike Flood and Andy Ruback; (Flood Communications West, LLC)
- Sister stations: KSID (AM)

History
- First air date: September 13, 1974
- Call sign meaning: Sidney

Technical information
- Licensing authority: FCC
- Facility ID: 35603
- Class: C1
- ERP: 100,000 watts
- HAAT: 117 meters (384 ft)
- Transmitter coordinates: 41°10′57.9″N 103°11′46.7″W

Links
- Public license information: Public file; LMS
- Webcast: Listen Live
- Website: 98.7 The Big Boy Online

KSID-FM (98.7 MHz) is a radio station broadcasting a country music format. Licensed to Sidney, Nebraska, United States, the station is owned by Mike Flood and Andy Ruback, through licensee Flood Communications West, LLC.

== History ==
On May 5, 2021, KSID-FM changed their format from hot adult contemporary to country, branded as "98.7 The Big Boy".
