= KNEB (AM) =

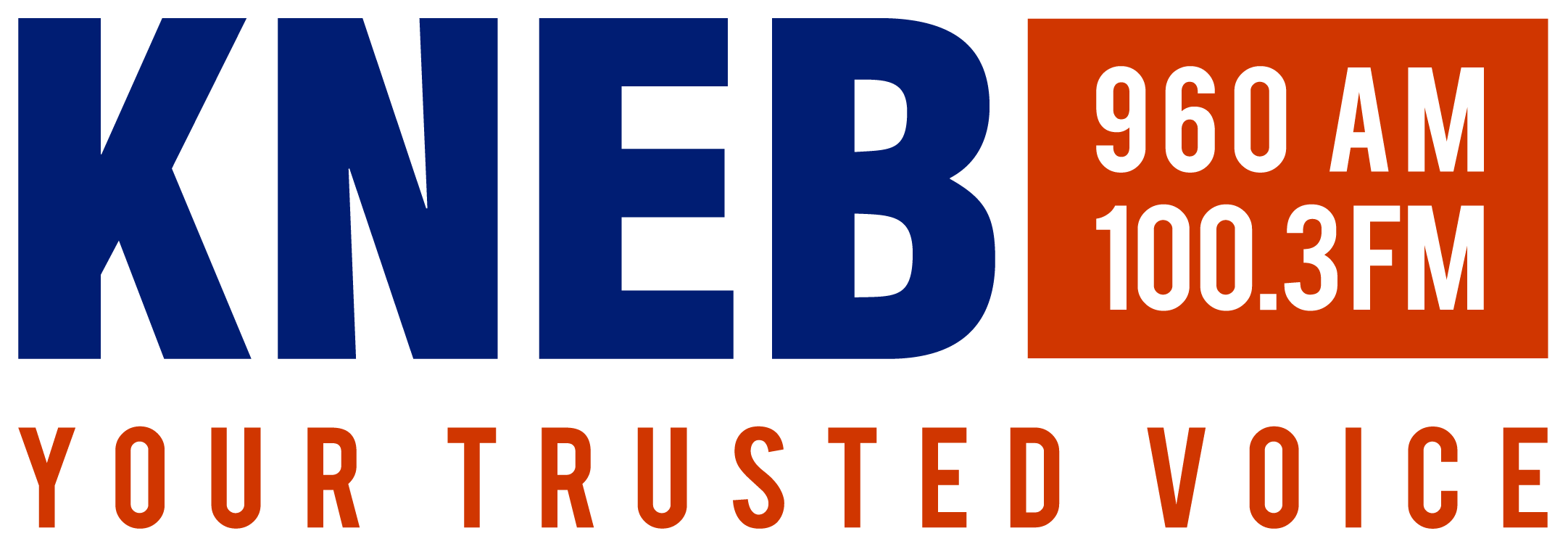
- Scottsbluff, Nebraska; United States
- Broadcast area: Nebraska Panhandle & Eastern Wyoming
- Frequency: 960 kHz
- Branding: Your Trusted Voice

Programming
- Format: Talk radio
- Affiliations: ABC News Radio; Premiere Networks; Westwood One

Ownership
- Owner: Nebraska Rural Radio Association
- Sister stations: KNEB-FM, KOZY-FM, KMOR, KHYY, KOLT

History
- First air date: January 1, 1948
- Call sign meaning: "Know Nebraska Even Better" or Nebraska

Technical information
- Licensing authority: FCC
- Facility ID: 51463
- Class: B
- Power: 5,000 watts (day); 350 watts (night)
- Transmitter coordinates: 41°47′30.00″N 103°38′29.00″W
- Translator: 100.3 K262CU (Scottsbluff)

Links
- Public license information: Public file; LMS
- Webcast: Listen live
- Website: kneb.com

KNEB (960 kHz) is an AM radio station broadcasting a talk format targeting the agriculture industry. Like its sister station, KNEB-FM, it is licensed to Scottsbluff, Nebraska, United States and serves the Nebraska Panhandle and Southeast Wyoming area. The station is owned by Nebraska Rural Radio Association and features programming from ABC News Radio.

== History ==
KNEB began broadcasting on January 1, 1948. The station originally operated on 970 kHz as a daytime-only outlet with 500 watts of power In 1953, the station moved to its current frequency of 960 kHz, allowing for both daytime and nighttime operations after a lengthy approval process involving interference concerns from other regional stations. The station was acquired in 1984 by the Nebraska Rural Radio Association (NRRA), a cooperative owned by thousands of farmers and ranchers This ownership transition shifted the station's focus heavily toward agricultural news, markets, and weather, serving the specific needs of the "Wyobraska" rural community.

In addition, KNEB's programming is simulcast on translator K262CU (100.3 FM).

KNEB is part of the Rural Radio Network, unique in that the stations are owned and operated by a cooperative of farmers and ranchers, the Nebraska Rural Radio Association. During the catastrophic tornado outbreak of June 27, 1955, KNEB provided critical live coverage via its mobile unit.
