= KNEB-FM =

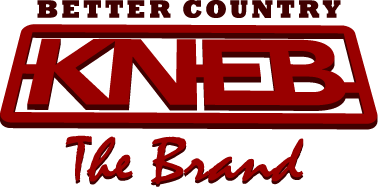
- Scottsbluff, Nebraska; United States
- Broadcast area: "Wyobraska" - Western Nebraska & Eastern Wyoming
- Frequency: 94.1 MHz (HD Radio)
- Branding: 94.1 The Brand

Programming
- Format: Country music
- Affiliations: Motor Racing Network, Performance Racing Network, Huskers Radio Network

Ownership
- Owner: Nebraska Rural Radio Association
- Sister stations: KNEB, KOZY-FM, KMOR, KHYY, KOLT

History
- First air date: December 20, 1960; 65 years ago
- Call sign meaning: "Know Nebraska Even Better" or Nebraska

Technical information
- Licensing authority: FCC
- Facility ID: 51462
- Class: C1
- ERP: 75,000 watts
- HAAT: 207 meters (679 ft)
- Transmitter coordinates: 41°42′4″N 103°40′49″W

Links
- Public license information: Public file; LMS
- Webcast: Listen Live
- Website: knebfm.com

KNEB-FM (94.1 MHz), better known as 94.1 The Trail, is a radio station broadcasting a country music format. Licensed to Scottsbluff, Nebraska, United States, the station serves the western Nebraska and eastern Wyoming (Wyobraska) area. The station is owned by Nebraska Rural Radio Association.

== History ==
KNEB-FM officially signed on the air on December 20, 1960. The station was established by the Scottsbluff Broadcasting Corp., which also owned its AM counterpart, KNEB. While the AM station focused on news and talk, the FM signal was launched to provide musical programming to the Nebraska Panhandle and Eastern Wyoming. In 1984, the station was acquired by its current owner, the Nebraska Rural Radio Association (NRRA), a cooperative owned and operated by farmers and ranchers. The station significantly expanded its local market presence in November 2019, when the NRRA purchased several competing stations from Legacy Communications for $1.75 million.

== HD Radio ==
The station broadcast on HD Radio at 94.1 FM.

On July 12, 2018, KNEB-FM launched a classic country format on its HD2 subchannel, branded as "101.7 The Trail" (formerly simulcast on translator K269DO 101.7 FM Scottsbluff). This subchannel went silent on November 1, 2019, as the format was moved to KHYY and rebranded to "106.9 The Trail." That frequency then upgraded later and moved to 107.3 FM, thus changing the name to 107.3 The Trail.
