= KOLT (AM) =

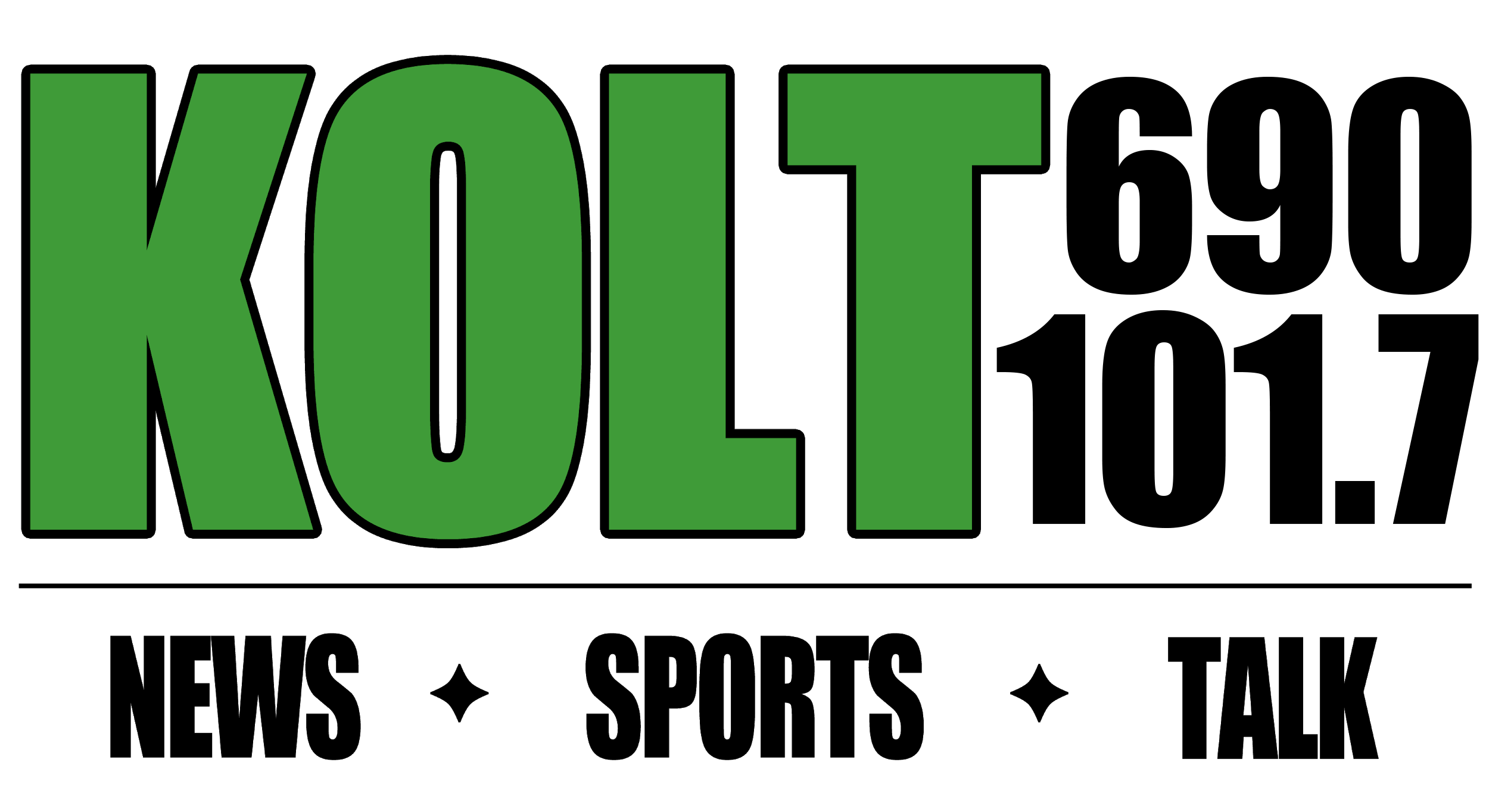
- Terrytown, Nebraska; United States
- Broadcast area: Nebraska Panhandle & Eastern Wyoming
- Frequency: 690 kHz
- Branding: News Talk 690 & 101.7 FM

Programming
- Format: News/talk
- Affiliations: Fox News Radio; Premiere Networks; Westwood One

Ownership
- Owner: Nebraska Rural Radio Association
- Sister stations: KNEB (AM); KNEB-FM; KOZY-FM; KMOR; KHYY

History
- First air date: June 15, 1961; 64 years ago
- Former call signs: KTCI (1961–1962); KEYR (1962–1989); KOAQ (1989–2019)

Technical information
- Licensing authority: FCC
- Facility ID: 67472
- Class: D
- Power: 1,000 watts day; 75 watts night
- Transmitter coordinates: 41°47′29.9″N 103°38′30.8″W
- Translator: 101.7 K269DO (Scottsbluff)

Links
- Public license information: Public file; LMS
- Webcast: Listen live
- Website: ruralradio.com/kolt/

KOLT (690 kHz) is an AM radio station broadcasting a conservative news/talk format. Licensed to Terrytown, Nebraska, United States, the station is owned by the Nebraska Rural Radio Association.

In addition, KOLT's programming is simulcast on translator K269DO (101.7 FM).

== History ==
The station on 690 kHz first signed on the air on June 15, 1961, using the call letters KTCI. It was founded by Terry Carpenter, a prominent Nebraska politician and businessman. In July 1962, the station was sold to Western Nebraska Broadcasting Co., and the call sign was changed to KEYR. During this era, KEYR operated with a "Pop Standards" format and was an affiliate of the Mutual Broadcasting System.

In 1989, the station adopted the call letters KOAQ. For the next three decades, KOAQ served the region with various formats, including oldies and regional Mexican.

The most significant change in the station's history occurred in November 2019. Following the acquisition of the Legacy Communications cluster by the Nebraska Rural Radio Association (NRRA), the historic KOLT call letters and its long-running News/Talk format were moved from the 1320 kHz frequency to the 690 kHz frequency. This move allowed the NRRA to maintain the KOLT brand while operating from a different technical facility. The original 1320 kHz license was surrendered to the FCC and subsequently deleted.

On March 15, 2017, the then-KOAQ changed their format from regional Mexican to classic country, branded as "Country Legends".

== Ownership ==
In May 2013, Armada Media and Legacy Broadcasting traded some stations in Nebraska, with Armada's two Holdrege stations (KUVR and KMTY) going to Legacy and Legacy's stations in Scottsbluff and North Platte markets, including KOAQ, going to Armada. The station was eventually sold to the Nebraska Rural Radio Association.
