= KVSS (FM) =

- Papillion, Nebraska; United States
- Broadcast area: Omaha - Lincoln, Nebraska
- Frequency: 102.7 MHz
- Branding: Spirit Catholic Radio Network

Programming
- Format: Catholic
- Affiliations: EWTN Radio

Ownership
- Owner: VSS Catholic Communications
- Sister stations: KETT

History
- First air date: April 25, 1965
- Former call signs: KWHG (1965–1973); KHKS (1973–1975); KFOR-FM (1975–1980); KFRX (1980–2007); KBZR (2007–2009)
- Call sign meaning: Veni, Sancte Spiritus ("Come, Holy Spirit" in Latin)

Technical information
- Licensing authority: FCC
- Facility ID: 34435
- Class: C1
- ERP: 46,100 watts
- HAAT: 409.3 meters (1,343 ft)
- Transmitter coordinates: 41°4′15.9″N 96°13′32.3″W
- Translators: 89.3 K207BY (Chadron); 99.3 K257FK (Columbus)
- Repeaters: 88.1 KEJS (Sargent); 88.3 KOLB (Hartington); 90.1 KFJS (North Platte); 90.5 KETW (Ogallala); 91.5 KJWM (Grand Island); 91.9 KVEJ (Valentine); 99.5 KETT (Mitchell)

Links
- Public license information: Public file; LMS
- Webcast: Listen live
- Website: spiritcatholicradio.com

KVSS (102.7 FM) is a non-commercial radio station airing a Catholic radio format. Licensed to Papillion, Nebraska, the station serves the Omaha and Lincoln areas. Some weekday shows are locally produced with EWTN Radio Network programs airing nights and weekends. The station is listener-supported, holding periodic on-the-air fundraisers and seeking donations on its website. It is owned by VSS Catholic Communications. KVSS's studios are on West A Street in Omaha (with auxiliary studios located in Lincoln and Grand Island).

KVSS has an effective radiated power (ERP) of 46,100 watts. The transmitter is on Pflug Road near South 204th Street in Gretna, Nebraska. Programming is also heard on two FM translators, K207BY on 89.3 MHz in Chadron and K257FK on 99.3 MHz in Columbus.

== History ==
=== KVSS ===
In January 1999, VSS Catholic Communications, Inc. started radio station KNOS, a 500-watt signal at 88.9 MHz. The station was headed by Bill Thompson. It began broadcasting a mix of Contemporary Christian music and Catholic talk and teaching programs from the EWTN Radio Network. Additional programming followed from St. Joseph Communications, Catholic Answers, Ave Maria and Starboard Communications. After broadcasting for 10 years on a small signal, VSS partnered with Kolbe Media, a group of people committed to Catholic radio in the Lincoln, Nebraska, community.

On January 29, 2009, Spirit Catholic Radio purchased a new 50,000-watt signal on 102.7 FM. The signal was able to reach both the Omaha and Lincoln communities, as well as over 1 million potential listeners throughout eastern Nebraska and western Iowa. Its former frequency was sold to the Bible Broadcasting Network and is now KYFG.

=== 102.7 history ===
Beginning in early 1980, the frequency was home to Lincoln's KFRX, which initially aired album rock before shifting to a long running top 40 format in July 1983. In 2007, after Clear Channel sold its Lincoln stations to Three Eagles Communications, Three Eagles spun off 102.7 FM and KRKR to Chapin Communications in order to meet ownership limits. This arrangement was only temporary, as Chapin was the intermediate buyer while a permanent buyer was being sought.

On September 18, 2007, KFRX moved its format to its sister station at 106.3 FM, while 102.7 FM began stunting with a continuously repeating message directing listeners to the new frequency. A week later, 102.7 FM (now under the KLMY call letters, which later changed to KBZR) flipped to a soft AC format, branded as "102.7 The Breeze". As part of the changes, the station was granted a construction permit to change its city of license from Lincoln to Papillion, and its transmitter site from Lincoln to Gretna, in order to move into the Omaha radio market.

After a successful fundraiser needed to purchase KBZR, the Federal Communications Commission (FCC) approved the sale of the station from Chapin to KVSS in late December 2008. The station went on air with its new signal on January 29, 2009, and then moved to the Gretna tower and began broadcasting at that site on June 9.
