= KOZY-FM =

- Bridgeport, Nebraska; United States
- Broadcast area: "Wyobraska" - Western Nebraska & Eastern Wyoming
- Frequency: 101.3 MHz
- Branding: All The Hits

Programming
- Format: Top 40 (CHR)

Ownership
- Owner: Nebraska Rural Radio Association
- Sister stations: KNEB, KNEB-FM, KMOR, KHYY, KOLT

History
- First air date: 2001; 25 years ago (as KOLT-FM) 2009; 17 years ago (as KOZY-FM)
- Former call signs: KOLT-FM (2001–2007) KMOR (2007–2008)

Technical information
- Licensing authority: FCC
- Facility ID: 81766
- Class: C0
- ERP: 100,000 watts
- HAAT: 339 meters (1,112 ft)
- Transmitter coordinates: 41°50′23.00″N 103°49′36.00″W

Links
- Public license information: Public file; LMS
- Webcast: Listen Live
- Website: kozyfm.com

KOZY-FM (101.3 FM), is a radio station broadcasting a Top 40 (CHR) music format. Licensed to Bridgeport, Nebraska, in the United States, the station is currently owned by the Nebraska Rural Radio Association.

== History ==
KOZY-FM originally signed on the air in 2001 under the call letters KOLT-FM. The station was issued to Tracy Broadcasting and initially operated with a country music format. In February 2007, the station underwent a format flip to Adult Contemporary and changed its call letters to KMOR-FM. The current KOZY-FM call letters were officially adopted in January 2008.

In 2007, it was sold to Legacy Communications (headed by Jay Vavricek) as part of a multi-station acquisition. In 2013, Armada Media assumed operations through a trade with Legacy Broadcasting. In 2020, the Nebraska Rural Radio Association (NRRA) completed a $1.75 million purchase to acquire the station along with six others.
