= KETT =

Simulcasts KVSS Papillion
- Mitchell, Nebraska; United States
- Broadcast area: Scottsbluff, Nebraska
- Frequency: 99.5 MHz
- Branding: Spirit Catholic Radio Network

Programming
- Format: Catholic
- Affiliations: EWTN Radio

Ownership
- Owner: VSS Catholic Communications, Inc.
- Sister stations: KVSS

History
- First air date: 2008
- Former frequencies: 99.3 MHz (2008–2022)

Technical information
- Licensing authority: FCC
- Facility ID: 164137
- Class: C2
- ERP: 13,000 watts
- HAAT: 293 meters (961 ft)
- Transmitter coordinates: 41°50′23.00″N 103°49′35.00″W

Links
- Public license information: Public file; LMS
- Webcast: Listen Live
- Website: www.spiritcatholicradio.com

KETT (99.5 FM) is a radio station broadcasting a Catholic format. Licensed to Mitchell, Nebraska, United States, it is currently owned by VSS Catholic Communications, Inc.

== Format change ==
On November 28, 2013, KETT switched from an Active Rock format (99.3 The Rock) to an Adult Contemporary to a religious format under the new name of Spirit 99.3.

== Ownership ==
In May 2013, Armada Media and Legacy Broadcasting traded some stations in Nebraska, with two stations in Holdrege (KUVR/1380 and KMTY/97.7) going to Legacy and eight others in the Scottsbluff and North Platte markets [KZTL/93.5 (Paxton-North Platte) and KRNP/100.7 (Sutherland-North Platte) KOAQ/690 (Terrytown), KOLT/1320 (Scottsbluff), KMOR/93.3 (Gering), KETT/99.3 (Mitchell), KOZY-FM/101.3 (Bridgeport), KHYY/106.9 (Minatare)] going to Armada Media. A purchase price was not announced.

Effective January 17, 2020, Legacy Broadcasting sold KETT and several sister stations to Nebraska Rural Radio Association for $1.75 million. Nebraska Rural Radio Association simultaneously flipped KETT to VSS Catholic Communications, Inc. for $40,000; VSS flipped it to a religious format.
