= KHYY =

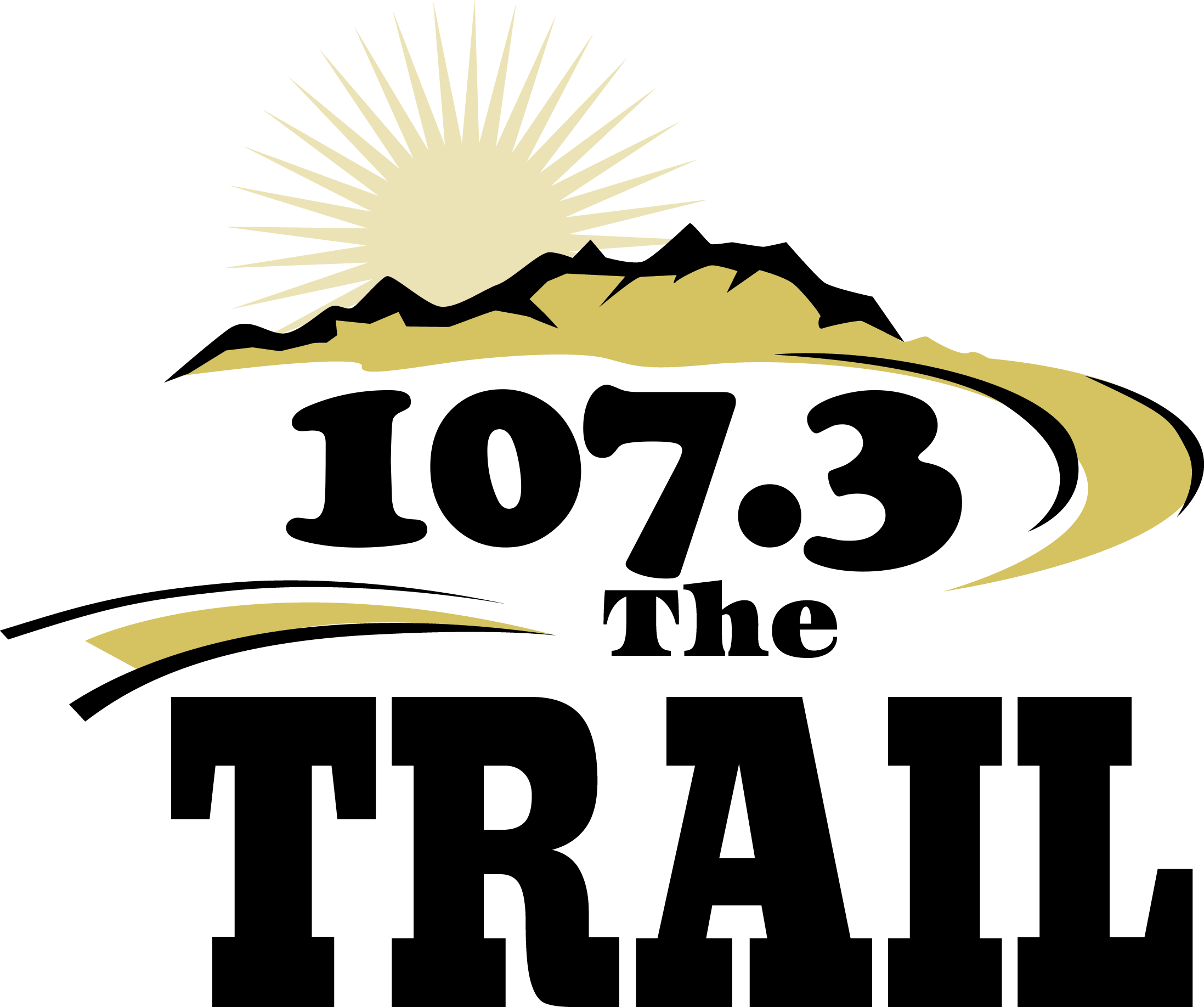
- Minatare, Nebraska; United States
- Broadcast area: "Wyobraska" - Western Nebraska & Eastern Wyoming
- Frequency: 107.3 MHz
- Branding: "107.3 The Trail"

Programming
- Format: Classic country
- Affiliations: ABC News Radio

Ownership
- Owner: Nebraska Rural Radio Association
- Sister stations: KNEB, KNEB-FM, KOZY-FM, KMOR, KOLT

History
- First air date: 2008; 18 years ago
- Former frequencies: 106.9 MHz (2008–2022)

Technical information
- Licensing authority: FCC
- Facility ID: 164136
- Class: C3
- ERP: 100,000 watts
- HAAT: 339 meters (1,112 ft)
- Transmitter coordinates: 41°50′22.8″N 103°49′37″W

Links
- Public license information: Public file; LMS
- Webcast: Listen Live
- Website: khyyfm.com

KHYY (107.3 FM, "The Trail") is a radio station broadcasting a classic country music format. Licensed to Minatare, Nebraska, in the United States, the station is currently owned by Nebraska Rural Radio Association.

== History ==
KHYY-FM first began broadcasting in November 2008. The station is licensed to Minatare, Nebraska, and was originally owned by Armada Media before being traded to Legacy Broadcasting in 2013.

On November 1, 2019, the station underwent a significant rebranding after being acquired by the Nebraska Rural Radio Association (NRRA). The "Classic Country" format previously found on a subchannel of KNEB-FM was moved to KHYY, and the station began branding itself as "The Trail".

For most of its early history, the station operated on 106.9 MHz. However, as part of a technical realignment to improve coverage, the station moved to its current frequency of 107.3 MHz. In August 2022, the station's original transmitter building was destroyed by a fire, and the 280-foot tower site west of Scottsbluff subsequently collapsed during a high-wind event in 2024. Operations were moved to a consolidated tower site to maintain service.
