= Terrytown, Nebraska =

City in Nebraska, United States

- City
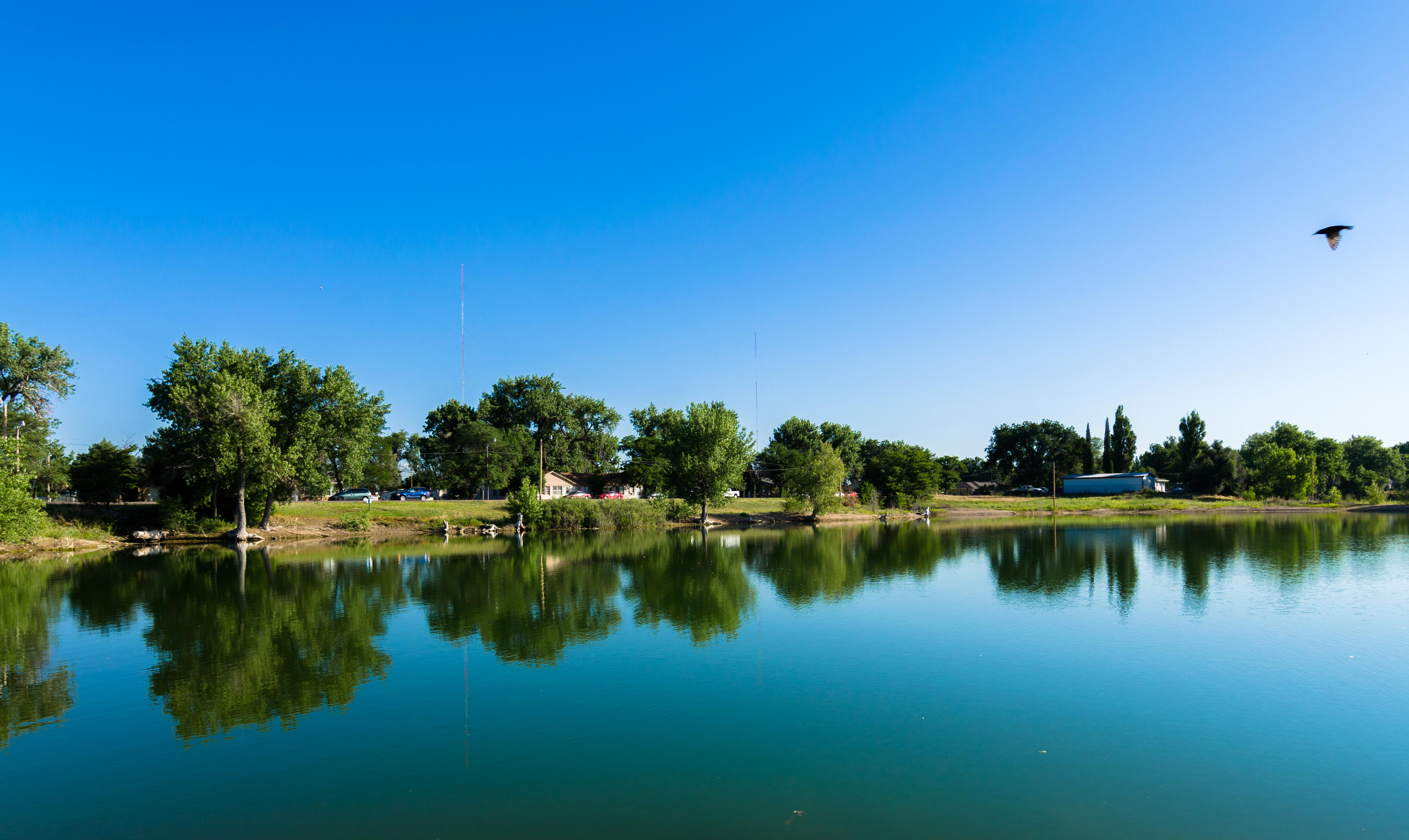
- Terrytown viewed from Carpenter's Park over Terry's Lake, July 2017

- Location of Terrytown, Nebraska
- Coordinates: 41°50′47″N 103°40′14″W
- Country: United States
- State: Nebraska
- County: Scotts Bluff

Area
  - Total: 0.51 sq mi (1.32 km^{2})
  - Land: 0.47 sq mi (1.23 km^{2})
  - Water: 0.035 sq mi (0.09 km^{2})
- Elevation: 3,878 ft (1,182 m)

Population (2020)
  - Total: 1,057
  - Density: 2,230.3/sq mi (861.14/km^{2})
- Time zone: UTC-7 (Mountain (MST))
  - Summer (DST): UTC-6 (MDT)
- ZIP code: 69341
- Area code: 308
- FIPS code: 31-48585
- GNIS feature ID: 2399961
- Website: www.terrytown.org

Terrytown is a city in Scotts Bluff County, Nebraska, United States. The population was 1,057 at the 2020 census. It is part of the Scottsbluff, Nebraska Micropolitan Statistical Area. Terrytown is located on the bank of the North Platte River between the cities of Scottsbluff and Gering, Nebraska. Separated only by the river, Scottsbluff and Gering have grown together to form the 7th largest urban area in Nebraska, which incorporates the city of Terrytown as well.

== History ==
Terrytown was founded in 1949 by Terry Carpenter, a successful Scottsbluff businessman and Nebraska state senator in the 1950s and 1960s.

== Geography ==
According to the United States Census Bureau, the city has a total area of 0.57 square miles (1.48 km^{2}), of which 0.53 square miles (1.37 km^{2}) is land and 0.04 square miles (0.10 km^{2}) is water.

== Demographics ==
Historical population
Census	Pop.	Note	%±
1950	228		—
1960	164		−28.1%
1970	747		355.5%
1980	727		−2.7%
1990	656		−9.8%
2000	646		−1.5%
2010	1,198		85.4%
2020	1,057		−11.8%
U.S. Decennial Census

=== 2010 census ===
As of the census of 2010, there were 1,198 people, 436 households, and 290 families residing in the city. The population density was 2,260.4 inhabitants per square mile (872.7/km^{2}). There were 465 housing units at an average density of 877.4 per square mile (338.8/km^{2}). The racial makeup of the city was 74.3% White, 0.4% African American, 4.3% Native American, 0.9% Asian, 17.4% from other races, and 2.8% from two or more races. Hispanic or Latino of any race were 42.2% of the population.

There were 436 households, of which 41.1% had children under the age of 18 living with them, 37.4% were married couples living together, 19.5% had a female householder with no husband present, 9.6% had a male householder with no wife present, and 33.5% were non-families. 25.2% of all households were made up of individuals, and 8.3% had someone living alone who was 65 years of age or older. The average household size was 2.74 and the average family size was 3.27.

The median age in the city was 28.4 years. 34.1% of residents were under the age of 18; 11.4% were between the ages of 18 and 24; 23.3% were from 25 to 44; 21.5% were from 45 to 64; and 9.5% were 65 years of age or older. The gender makeup of the city was 46.9% male and 53.1% female.

=== 2000 census ===
As of the census of 2000, there were 646 people, 246 households, and 150 families residing in the city. The population density was 1,521.0 inhabitants per square mile (587.3/km^{2}). There were 271 housing units at an average density of 638.1 per square mile (246.4/km^{2}). The racial makeup of the city was 73.22% White, 6.81% Native American, 17.18% from other races, and 2.79% from two or more races. Hispanic or Latino of any race were 44.12% of the population.

There were 246 households, out of which 42.7% had children under the age of 18 living with them, 34.6% were married couples living together, 19.9% had a female householder with no husband present, and 39.0% were non-families. 31.7% of all households were made up of individuals, and 13.0% had someone living alone who was 65 years of age or older. The average household size was 2.63 and the average family size was 3.39.

In the city, the population was spread out, with 36.7% under the age of 18, 11.1% from 18 to 24, 30.5% from 25 to 44, 13.5% from 45 to 64, and 8.2% who were 65 years of age or older. The median age was 26 years. For every 100 females, there were 91.7 males. For every 100 females age 18 and over, there were 88.5 males.

As of 2000 the median income for a household in the city was $16,536, and the median income for a family was $19,583. Males had a median income of $20,192 versus $13,393 for females. The per capita income for the city was $8,550. About 44.2% of families and 41.0% of the population were below the poverty line, including 46.7% of those under age 18 and 26.7% of those age 65 or over.

== Transportation ==
Terrytown has been served by public transit since January 10, 2018, with two bus routes provided by Tri-City Roadrunner.

== Education ==
It is in the Gering Public Schools school district.

== See also ==
- List of municipalities in Nebraska
