= KMOR (FM) =

- Gering, Nebraska; United States
- Broadcast area: Scottsbluff, Nebraska
- Frequency: 93.3 MHz
- Branding: KMOR 93.3

Programming
- Format: Classic rock

Ownership
- Owner: Nebraska Rural Radio Association
- Sister stations: KOLT, KHYY, KOZY

History
- First air date: 1996 (as KOLT-FM at 103.9)
- Former call signs: KANG (1995–1996); KOLT-FM (1996–2001); KOZY-FM (2001–2008)
- Former frequencies: 103.9 MHz (1996–2007)

Technical information
- Licensing authority: FCC
- Facility ID: 67473
- Class: C0
- ERP: 100,000 watts
- HAAT: 339 meters (1,112 ft)
- Transmitter coordinates: 41.8397°N 103.8272°W

Links
- Public license information: Public file; LMS
- Webcast: Listen live
- Website: ruralradio.com/kmor/

KMOR (93.3 FM) is a radio station broadcasting a classic rock format. Licensed to Gering, Nebraska, United States, it serves the Scottsbluff, Nebraska area. The station is currently operated by the Nebraska Rural Radio Association.

On August 27, 2007, KMOR's classic rock format moved from 101.3 FM in Bridgeport, Nebraska to 93.3 FM in Gering, Nebraska.

== History ==
The original KMOR-FM signed on the air on September 4, 1978, on the 92.9 MHz frequency. Established by the Tracy Corporation, it was a high-power 100,000-watt station. In August 2007, the KMOR call letters and its signature classic rock format were moved to 93.3 MHz (licensed to Gering) as part of a multi-station frequency swap. The 93.3 FM frequency itself has a complex history prior to becoming KMOR. It originally signed on in 1996 as KOLT-FM (at 103.9 MHz) before moving to 93.3 and eventually adopting the KMOR branding during the 2007 consolidation.

== Ownership ==
In May 2013, Armada Media and Legacy Broadcasting traded some stations in Nebraska, with two stations in Holdrege (KUVR/1380 and KMTY/97.7) going to Legacy and eight others in the Scottsbluff and North Platte markets [KZTL/93.5 (Paxton-North Platte) and KRNP/100.7 (Sutherland-North Platte) KOAQ/690 (Terrytown), KOLT/1320 (Scottsbluff), KMOR/93.3 (Gering), KETT/99.3 (Mitchell), KOZY-FM/101.3 (Bridgeport), KHYY/106.9 (Minatare)] going to Armada Media. A purchase price was not announced.

The station was acquired by the Nebraska Rural Radio Association (NRRA) in 2019 as part of a $1.75 million purchase of the Legacy Communications cluster. This transition brought KMOR-FM under the same cooperative ownership as KNEB and KOLT, focusing on regional service for the Nebraska Panhandle.
