= KRVN =

KRVN may refer to:

- KRVN (AM), a radio station (880 AM) licensed to Lexington, Nebraska, United States
- KRVN-FM, a radio station (93.1 FM) licensed to Lexington, Nebraska, United States
