= Plum Creek Railroad Attack =

1867 train attack in present-day Lexington, Nebraska, US

- Part of Red Cloud's War
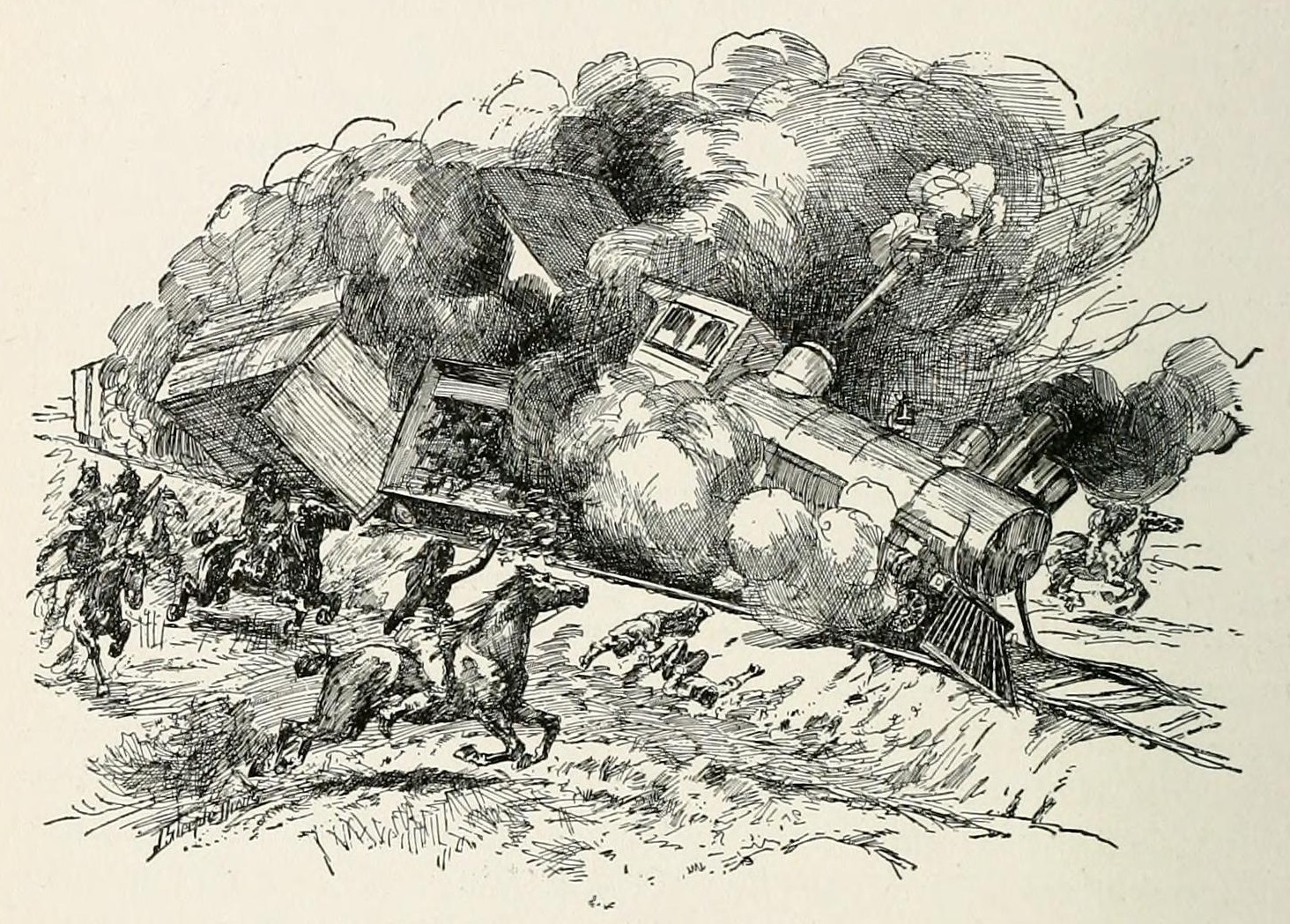
- Illustration of the event by John Steeple Davis (c. 1891)
- Location: 40.790695120°N 99.808119581°W; Plum Creek railway station (present-day Lexington), Dawson County, Nebraska, United States
- Date: night of August 7-8, 1867
- Target: freight train of the Union Pacific Railroad
- Deaths: 4
- Injuries: 1
- Perpetrator: Turkey Leg

Plum Creek Railroad Attack was an armed sabotage action on 7 August, 1867 committed by the group of Northern Cheyenne warriors led by their chief Turkey Leg against a freight train and infrastructure of the Union Pacific Railroad company. Near the Plum Creek railway and settler station (present-day Lexington, Nebraska). Cheyennes dismantled a part of the track of the first transcontinental railroad causing derailment of a steam locomotive, death of four people and scalping one alive.

The action resulted in the punitive expedition led by Major Frank North, which ended Turkey Leg men's activities in the late summer 1867. The event remains one of the few cases, when Native American warriors were able to successfully derail and destroy a train set.

== Prelude ==
In 1867 multiple conflicts between Native American tribes and U.S. settlers erupted or continued at the area of the American frontier. In Wyoming, Sioux fought in the Red Cloud's War since 1866, in Kansas. Plains Indians, like Cheyenne, Comanche and others, were resisting in so-called Hancock's War while the Comanche campaign was launched by the U.S. Army against the Comanche in northern and central Texas.

In summer 1867, a local group of Cheyenne warriors living in the later Dawson County area decided to launch a sophisticated plan to attack the transcontinental railroad site, as a key feature of the European-American settlement process along the track. Those Cheyennes were fighting against the white settlers for a few years and also proceeded an attack on the Plum Creek settlement station on August 8, 1864, which caused the station to be temporarily abandoned. Connections are known about the intention of the Nebraskan Cheyennes to support the war efforts of the tribes loyal to Oglala chief Red Cloud.

== Attack ==
At dawn of August 7, 1867 a troupe of Cheyennes led by Turkey Leg arrived on the place of planned assault, a small bridge or culvert over the ravine about 3.5 miles (5.6 km) west of Plum Creek. With a use of tools gathered from the railroad construction site, men broke both of the railway tracks over the bridge, raising them up. Then they hid themselves in a tall grass nearby by the track and waited for the first train to approach.

At the evening of the day the construction supply train of the Union Pacific company stopped at the Plum Creek railway station on his way further west. Train was loaded with building material, including two wagons of bricks placed right behind the steam engine. Aware of hostile activities of the Cheyennes, a handcar with three section men was sent ahead as a scouting team. Around midnight this car encountered the obstacle, and ran into the ravine, bruising and stunning the men and frightening them so that they were unable to signal to the approaching train. As soon as the car landed at the bottom of the ravine, the attackers rushed up, when two of the men, least hurt, ran away in the darkness of the night. The third one, stunned by the fall of the car, was scalped at the site.

Without any knowledge about what had happened to the handcar, the Norris steam engine left the Plum Creek station anyway. The engineer Brooks Bowers (nicknamed Bully Brooks) saw the rail displacement, put down the brakes and reversed his engine, but all too late to stop the train, and the engine felt down the tracks with some of the wagons taking with it, including brick-loaded ones on the front.

The door of the fire-box was open, as the fireman named Henderson, Civil War veteran, was adding coal fuel to the flames, when the crash came. Henderson was thrown against the fire-box when the ravine was reached, and burned alive almost immediately after the impact. Brooks was thrown away of his driving post through the window of his cab, some twenty feet from the engine. As a result of this fall, his abdomen was ripped open, and later he was found sitting on the ground holding his protruding bowels in his hands. Fire of the engine then consumed wooden-made wagon bodies.

The conductor, placed on the train, survived the crash and after he realized the condition of Henderson and Bowers, was able to flee the crash site unnoticed by the Cheyennes, who reached the burning train with war cries. Then they plundered the train and left.

== Aftermath ==
The conductor reached 3,5-mile distant the Plum Creek station at about 2 AM of August 8 a group of riders left to reach the wrecked train, arriving there at 10 AM. The scalped railroad employee managed to survive and later worked for the company in Omaha.

As a result of this action, local U.S. Army command under General Augur ordered the force of about fifty men of Pawnee Scouts under Major Frank North ("Pawnee Battalion"), enlisted in March 1867 for intentional protecting the Union Pacific Railroad construction sites, to be dispatched to Plum Creek. A "severe" engagement took place near Plum Creek on August 22, in which Major North and forty-two of the scouts engaged 150 Oglala Lakota and Cheyenne warriors who were part of the freight train attack. The Pawnee scouts killed "many", and captured Turkey Leg's wife and child. The chief's family was later exchanged for three captured American girls and two settler boys who were held by Turkey Leg for a long time.

Sometime after August 1867 the Plum Creek station was burned and abandoned. On October 25, 1867 the track was officially inaugurated and opened for passenger and freight transport. Close to the former Plum Creek site, settlement called Lexington was founded later on 1871.

== Memory ==
In 1940 a marker identifying the site was placed, between the tracks and U.S. Route 30, by the initiative of a local group of the Daughters of the American Revolution organisation.

== Possible reflection in art ==
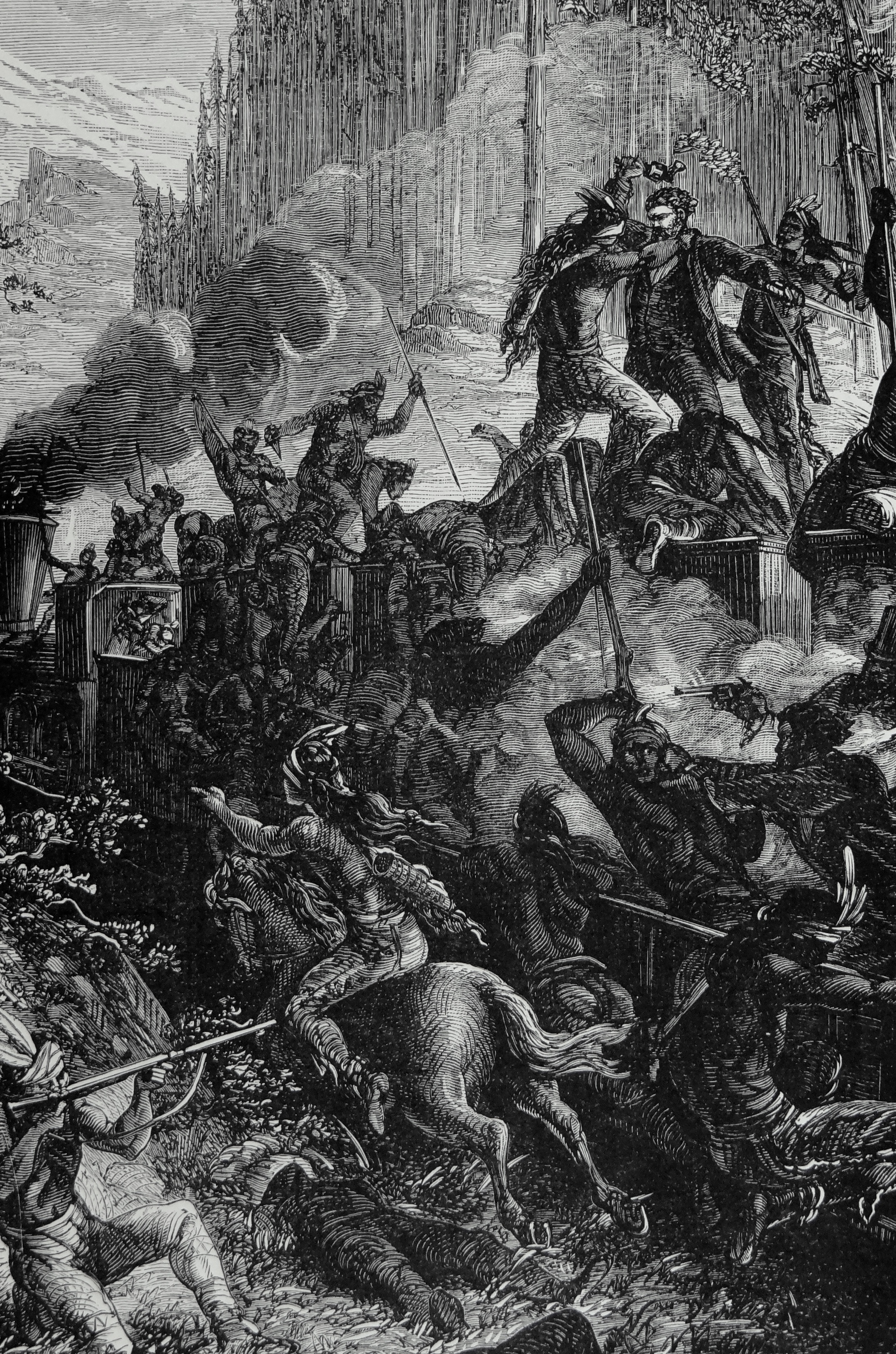
Illustration of the train attack in Verne's Around the World in Eighty Days, probably inspired by the Plum Creek incident (Alphonse de Neuville, 1872)

In Jules Verne's 1872 novel Around the World in Eighty Days, when the main character Phileas Fogg and his accompanies are travelling through the American mid-west by a Union Pacific train, Fog arranges a gun duel with his rival, Colonel Proctor, to be proceeded after the train stops in the Plum Creek station. Due to delay train skips the station and shortly after is attacked by a Native Americans warriors, seeking help by U.S. Army soldiers stationed at the next station, Kearney. Verne, often putting factical marks to his storytelling, even mentions date October 23, 1867 as a date of opening of this part of the trail in this part. As the Plum Creek event was mentioned by the French press, its possible that Verne got inspired by it for his site of the fictional train attack.

== See also ==
- Red Cloud's War
- First transcontinental railroad
- Lexington, Nebraska
- Frank North
- Around the World in Eighty Days

== Bibliography ==
- Johnson, Harrison (1880). Johnson's History of Nebraska. H. Gibson. p. 324-327.
- Williams, Henry T., ed. (1876). The Pacific tourist : Williams' illustrated trans-continental guide of travel, from the Atlantic to the Pacific Ocean. New York City: Henry T. Williams. p. 34.
