= KAMI (AM) =

- Cozad, Nebraska; United States
- Broadcast area: Central Nebraska
- Frequency: 1580 kHz
- Branding: Country Legends 100.1 FM and KAMI 1580

Programming
- Format: Classic Country

Ownership
- Owner: Nebraska Rural Radio Association
- Sister stations: KRVN-FM, KRVN (AM)

History
- First air date: November 24, 1965

Technical information
- Licensing authority: FCC
- Facility ID: 69845
- Class: D
- Power: 1,000 watts (day); 17 watts (night)
- Transmitter coordinates: 40°50′18″N 99°56′20″W
- Translators: 92.7 K224FL (Cozad); 100.1 K261BT (Lexington)

Links
- Public license information: Public file; LMS
- Webcast: Listen Live
- Website: krvn.com

KAMI (1580 AM) is a radio station serving Cozad, Nebraska. Owned by the Nebraska Rural Radio Association, it broadcasts a classic country format branded as Country Legends 100.1 FM and KAMI 1580.

== History ==
=== The beginning ===
This station began regular broadcasting on November 24, 1965, with 1,000 watts of daytime-only power on a frequency of 1580 kHz. The station was assigned the KAMI call sign by the Federal Communications Commission. KAMI was initially owned by Dawson County Broadcasting Corporation with Wayman E. May as president and Ed Strausburger and general manager.

=== Ownership changes ===
In February 1969, the station was acquired by KAMI Kountry Broadcasting Corporation with George Powers as company president and Andy Anderson as general manager. In May 1974, the station was sold to a similarly named company named KAMI Country Broadcasting Corporation with Andy Anderson staying on as general manager.

In May 1981, KAMI Country Broadcasting Corporation reached an agreement to sell this station to Tri-City Broadcasters, Inc. The deal was approved by the FCC on July 28, 1981. In May 1985, Tri-City Broadcasters, Inc, reached an agreement to sell this station to Vectoradio, Inc. The deal was approved by the FCC on July 1, 1985.

KAMI went dark on January 7, 2004, and unable to resume operations for financial reasons, they filed an application with the FCC seeking special temporary authority to remain dark until the station could be sold. A few days later, KAMI license holder Vectoradio, Inc., reached an agreement to sell this station and sister station KCVN to Community Broadcasting, Inc., for a combined $365,000. The deal was approved by the FCC on May 7, 2004, and the transaction was consummated on July 9, 2004. On May 7, the same day that the deal was approved, the FCC granted KAMI a main studio waiver allowing the station to be operated from a location outside the broadcast range of the KAMI signal.

In December 2014, it was announced that KAMI had been acquired by the Nebraska Rural Radio Association. The station then flipped to classic country. The purchase closed on February 2, 2015, at a price of $87,500.
