= Lexington, Nebraska =

- City
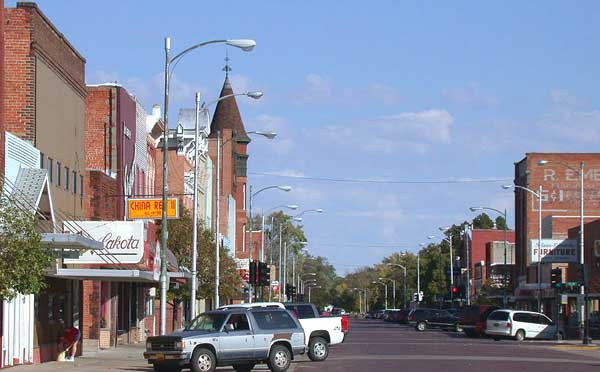
- Downtown Lexington, looking north (2004)

- Location of Lexington within Nebraska and Dawson County
- Coordinates: 40°46′38″N 99°44′44″W
- Country: United States
- State: Nebraska
- County: Dawson

Government
  - City manager: Joe Pepplitsch

Area
  - Total: 5.10 sq mi (13.20 km^{2})
  - Land: 5.07 sq mi (13.12 km^{2})
  - Water: 0.031 sq mi (0.08 km^{2})
- Elevation: 2,392 ft (729 m)

Population (2020)
  - Total: 10,348
  - Density: 2,042.3/sq mi (788.53/km^{2})
- Time zone: UTC−6 (Central (CST))
  - Summer (DST): UTC−5 (CDT)
- ZIP code: 68850
- Area code: 308
- FIPS code: 31-26910
- GNIS feature ID: 2395698
- Website: cityoflex.com

Lexington is a city in Dawson County, Nebraska, United States. The population was 10,348 at the 2020 census, making it the 16th most populous city in Nebraska. It is the county seat of Dawson County. Lexington is located in southern Nebraska, on the Platte River, southeast of North Platte. It sits along the route of U.S. Route 30 and the Union Pacific Railroad. In the 1860s, Lexington was the location of a stop along the Pony Express.

== History ==
Lexington began as a frontier trading post in 1860. The post was later destroyed. Fort Plum Creek was established near its ruins in 1864. Lexington was founded in 1871. It was originally called Plum Creek.

=== Plum Creek railroad attack ===
About 3.5 miles (5.6 km) west of Lexington on U.S. Route 30, a marker identifies the place of the Plum Creek Railroad Attack (40.790695120°N 99.808119581°W) where a band of Cheyenne derailed a Union Pacific freight train on August 7, 1867, during construction of the first transcontinental railroad. Boxcars were looted and burned, and three employees were killed: the engineer, the fireman, and a hand-car operator.

== Geography ==
According to the United States Census Bureau, the city has a total area of 4.51 square miles (11.68 km^{2}), of which 4.50 square miles (11.65 km^{2}) is land, and 0.01 square miles (0.03 km^{2}) is water.

== Climate ==
According to the Köppen Climate Classification system, Lexington has a hot-summer humid continental climate, abbreviated "Dfa" on climate maps. The hottest temperature recorded in Lexington was 114 °F (45.6 °C) on July 11–12, 1954, while the coldest temperature recorded was −27 °F (−32.8 °C) on December 22, 1983.

Climate data for Canaday Steam Plant, Nebraska, 1991–2020 normals, extremes 1893–present (Note: Precipitation and precipitation days are recorded at a different station with the following coordinates:40.7800°N 99.7200°W)
Month	Jan	Feb	Mar	Apr	May	Jun	Jul	Aug	Sep	Oct	Nov	Dec	Year
Record high °F (°C)	75 (24)	80 (27)	96 (36)	98 (37)	102 (39)	110 (43)	114 (46)	106 (41)	105 (41)	95 (35)	85 (29)	77 (25)	114 (46)
Mean maximum °F (°C)	61.8 (16.6)	66.2 (19.0)	77.8 (25.4)	84.9 (29.4)	90.8 (32.7)	96.0 (35.6)	97.8 (36.6)	96.0 (35.6)	93.0 (33.9)	87.1 (30.6)	74.3 (23.5)	62.9 (17.2)	99.5 (37.5)
Mean daily maximum °F (°C)	38.0 (3.3)	41.3 (5.2)	52.5 (11.4)	61.7 (16.5)	71.7 (22.1)	82.1 (27.8)	86.4 (30.2)	84.3 (29.1)	78.0 (25.6)	65.1 (18.4)	51.3 (10.7)	39.8 (4.3)	62.7 (17.1)
Daily mean °F (°C)	26.6 (−3.0)	29.6 (−1.3)	39.7 (4.3)	49.2 (9.6)	60.0 (15.6)	70.6 (21.4)	75.2 (24.0)	73.0 (22.8)	65.0 (18.3)	51.7 (10.9)	38.9 (3.8)	28.7 (−1.8)	50.7 (10.4)
Mean daily minimum °F (°C)	15.2 (−9.3)	17.8 (−7.9)	27.0 (−2.8)	36.7 (2.6)	48.3 (9.1)	59.2 (15.1)	64.1 (17.8)	61.7 (16.5)	52.1 (11.2)	38.3 (3.5)	26.4 (−3.1)	17.6 (−8.0)	38.7 (3.7)
Mean minimum °F (°C)	−5.9 (−21.1)	−1.5 (−18.6)	8.0 (−13.3)	21.9 (−5.6)	33.8 (1.0)	46.8 (8.2)	53.6 (12.0)	50.7 (10.4)	36.8 (2.7)	21.8 (−5.7)	9.0 (−12.8)	−2.2 (−19.0)	−11.1 (−23.9)
Record low °F (°C)	−29 (−34)	−39 (−39)	−17 (−27)	1 (−17)	10 (−12)	21 (−6)	36 (2)	36 (2)	21 (−6)	2 (−17)	−12 (−24)	−27 (−33)	−39 (−39)
Average precipitation inches (mm)	0.43 (11)	0.51 (13)	1.18 (30)	2.48 (63)	3.76 (96)	3.86 (98)	3.29 (84)	2.99 (76)	1.81 (46)	1.74 (44)	0.74 (19)	0.60 (15)	23.39 (595)
Average snowfall inches (cm)	5.9 (15)	4.9 (12)	2.3 (5.8)	1.0 (2.5)	0.1 (0.25)	0.0 (0.0)	0.0 (0.0)	0.0 (0.0)	0.0 (0.0)	0.6 (1.5)	1.9 (4.8)	3.3 (8.4)	20.0 (51)
Average extreme snow depth inches (cm)	2.7 (6.9)	3.7 (9.4)	2.1 (5.3)	0.9 (2.3)	0.1 (0.25)	0.0 (0.0)	0.0 (0.0)	0.0 (0.0)	0.0 (0.0)	0.3 (0.76)	1.7 (4.3)	2.8 (7.1)	6.9 (18)
Average precipitation days (≥ 0.01 in)	2.6	3.1	4.4	7.0	9.6	8.8	7.5	6.1	4.8	5.1	2.8	2.3	64.1
Average snowy days (≥ 0.1 in)	2.1	2.5	1.2	0.4	0.0	0.0	0.0	0.0	0.0	0.3	0.8	1.6	8.9
Source 1: NOAA
Source 2: National Weather Service

== Demographics ==
Historical population
Census	Pop.	Note	%±
1890	1,392		—
1900	1,343		−3.5%
1910	2,059		53.3%
1920	2,327		13.0%
1930	2,962		27.3%
1940	3,688		24.5%
1950	5,068		37.4%
1960	5,572		9.9%
1970	5,654		1.5%
1980	7,040		24.5%
1990	6,601		−6.2%
2000	10,011		51.7%
2010	10,230		2.2%
2020	10,348		1.2%
U.S. Decennial Census

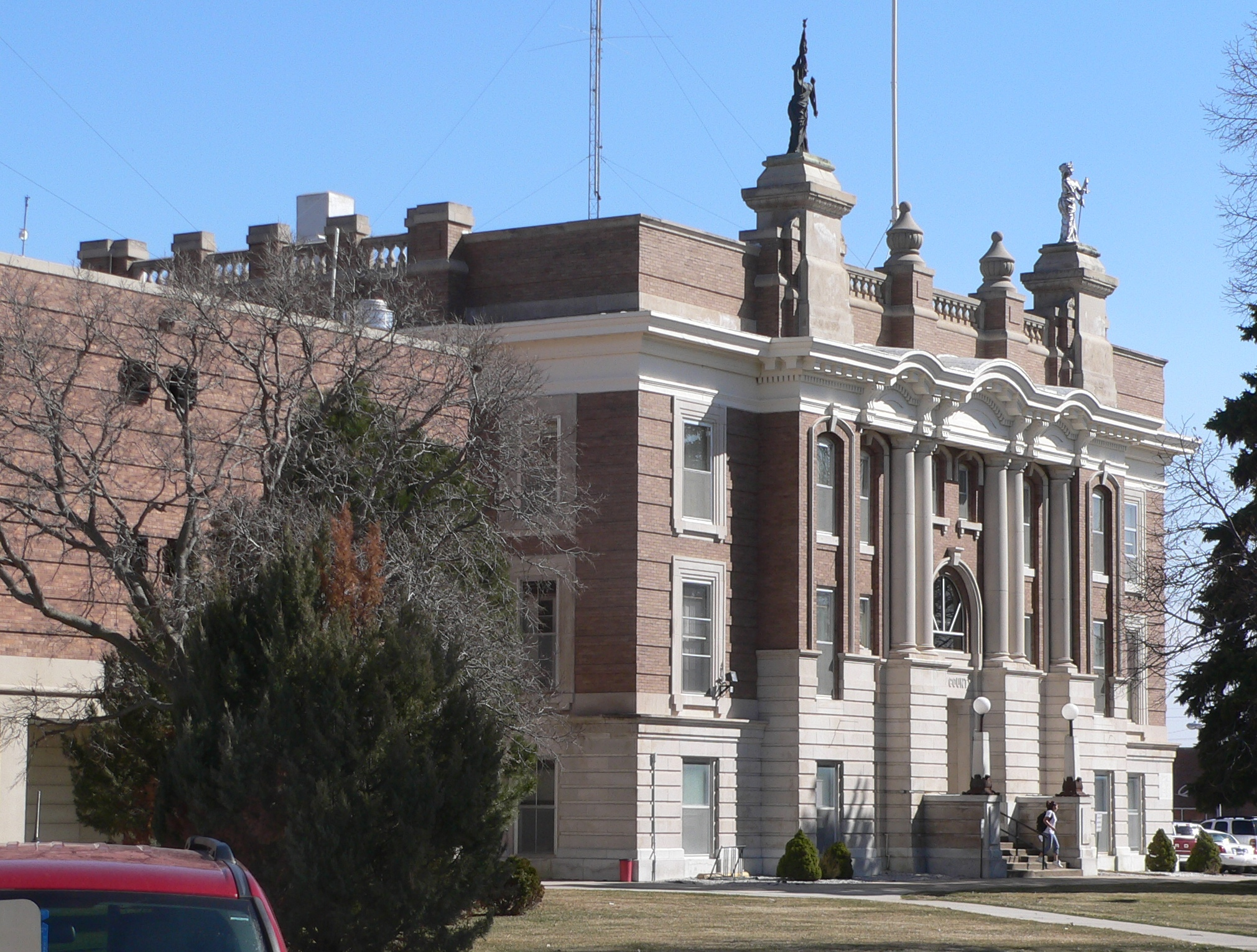
Dawson County Courthouse

Lexington is the principal city of the Lexington, Nebraska Micropolitan Statistical Area, which consists of Dawson and Gosper counties.

=== 2020 census ===
As of the 2020 census, Lexington had a population of 10,348. The census also counted 2,609 families. The median age was 30.8 years. 32.4% of residents were under the age of 18 and 10.4% of residents were 65 years of age or older. For every 100 females there were 106.1 males, and for every 100 females age 18 and over there were 104.7 males age 18 and over.

98.9% of residents lived in urban areas, while 1.1% lived in rural areas.

There were 3,258 households in Lexington, of which 45.2% had children under the age of 18 living in them. Of all households, 50.2% were married-couple households, 18.6% were households with a male householder and no spouse or partner present, and 24.0% were households with a female householder and no spouse or partner present. About 22.0% of all households were made up of individuals and 9.1% had someone living alone who was 65 years of age or older.

There were 3,470 housing units, of which 6.1% were vacant. The homeowner vacancy rate was 1.4% and the rental vacancy rate was 7.8%.

Racial composition as of the 2020 census
Race	Number	Percent
White	3,454	33.4%
Black or African American	1,079	10.4%
American Indian and Alaska Native	218	2.1%
Asian	117	1.1%
Native Hawaiian and Other Pacific Islander	18	0.2%
Some other race	3,804	36.8%
Two or more races	1,658	16.0%
Hispanic or Latino (of any race)	6,752	65.2%

=== Income and poverty ===
The 2016–2020 5-year American Community Survey estimates show that the median household income was $55,913 (with a margin of error of +/- $6,946) and the median family income $59,720 (+/- $6,835). Males had a median income of $35,099 (+/- $4,225) versus $26,953 (+/- $1,837) for females. The median income for those above 16 years old was $31,601 (+/- $3,983). Approximately, 10.8% of families and 14.4% of the population were below the poverty line, including 20.0% of those under the age of 18 and 7.9% of those ages 65 or over.

=== 2010 census ===
As of the census of 2010, there were 10,230 people, 3,180 households, and 2,320 families living in the city. The population density was 2,273.3 inhabitants per square mile (877.7/km^{2}). There were 3,403 housing units at an average density of 756.2 per square mile (292.0/km^{2}). The racial makeup of the city was 57.9% White, 6.6% African American, 1.2% Native American, 1.0% Asian, 0.4% Pacific Islander, 29.7% from other races, and 3.3% from two or more races. Hispanic or Latino people of any race were 60.4% of the population.

There were 3,180 households, of which 45.0% had children under the age of 18 living with them, 53.9% were married couples living together, 12.2% had a female householder with no husband present, 6.9% had a male householder with no wife present, and 27.0% were non-families. 22.1% of all households were made up of individuals, and 10.1% had someone living alone who was 65 years of age or older. The average household size was 3.17, and the average family size was 3.70.

The median age in the city was 29.4 years. 32.5% of residents were under the age of 18; 10.7% were between the ages of 18 and 24; 26.4% were from 25 to 44; 21.2% were from 45 to 64, and 9.3% were 65 years of age or older. The gender makeup of the city was 51.7% male and 48.3% female.

=== 2000 census ===
As of the 2000 census, there were 10,011 people, 3,095 households, and 2,237 families living in the city. The population density was 3,401.7 inhabitants per square mile (1,313.4/km^{2}). There were 3,322 housing units at an average density of 1,128.8 per square mile (435.8/km^{2}). The racial makeup of the city was 64.20% White, 0.44% African American, 1.17% Native American, 1.10% Asian, 0.02% Pacific Islander, 30.78% from other races, and 2.30% from two or more races. Hispanic or Latino people of any race were 51.15% of the population.

There were 3,095 households, out of which 43.1% had children under the age of 18 living with them, 57.0% were married couples living together, 9.5% had a female householder with no husband present, and 27.7% were non-families. 21.8% of all households were made up of individuals, and 11.1% had someone living alone who was 65 years of age or older. The average household size was 3.14, and the average family size was 3.65.

In the city, the population was spread out, with 32.6% under the age of 18, 10.2% from 18 to 24, 30.7% from 25 to 44, 16.1% from 45 to 64, and 10.4% who were 65 years of age or older. The median age was 30 years. For every 100 females, there were 108.6 males. For every 100 females age 18 and over, there were 108.6 males.

As of 2000, the median income for a household in the city was $38,098, and the median income for a family was $43,571. Males had a median income of $25,207 versus $20,857 for females. The per capita income for the city was $14,148. About 10.7% of families and 12.9% of the population were below the poverty line, including 16.1% of those under age 18 and 11.5% of those aged 65 or over.

== Economy ==
Lexington was home to a Sperry-New Holland combine plant, but it closed in 1985, eliminating 940 jobs.

In 1989, Iowa Beef Packers bought the Sperry-New Holland plant to convert it to a large beef packing plant in Lexington. At first, the plant only employed 1,200-1,300 people. In 2001, this facility was sold to Tyson Foods. In November 2025, Tyson Foods announced it would close the plant in January 2026, laying off 3,200 employees.

== Arts and culture ==
The Heartland Museum of Military Vehicles is located in Lexington adjacent to I-80.

The Dawson County Historical Society is a museum with the art pieces made by locals and objects such as cars, guns and household objects from former times that were owned by locals.

In 2020, the Association of Religion Data Archives found that Lexington had over 6,000 adherents of Protestant denominations and over 5,000 Catholics.

== Media ==
Radio

KRVN (AM) and KRVN-FM are in Lexington, owned by the Nebraska Rural Radio Association. The radio network (KRVN (AM), KNEB (AM), and KTIC (AM)) is owned and operated by a cooperative of farmers and ranchers, which was founded in 1948 and started KRVN in 1951.

Newspaper

Lexington is served by the biweekly Lexington Clipper-Herald.

== Sports ==
From 1956 to 1958, Lexington was home to the Lexington Red Sox, who were a minor league baseball team. Playing at the Dawson County Fairgrounds, the Red Sox were members of Nebraska State League as an affiliate of the Boston Red Sox. The 1956 Lexington Red Sox captured the Nebraska State League Championship.

== Transportation ==
=== Highway ===
Two Major US Highways serve Lexington. U.S. Route 30 is East-West through the middle of town along the UPRR and old Lincoln highway corridor. U.S. Route 283 terminates at Hwy 30 near downtown. It provides connection to Interstate 80 3 miles to the south, and points further in Kansas, Oklahoma, and Texas. Nebraska Highway 21 is state highway connecting north to Broken Bow and southwest to Eustis.

=== Bus ===
Intercity bus service to the city is provided by Burlington Trailways and Express Arrow.

=== Rail ===
There is no passenger rail service to Lexington. The Union Pacific Overland Route does pass through town, and provides freight service for local grain elevators, ethanol, and meat packing plants.

=== Air ===
Two miles northwest of town, the Lexington Airport Authority operates a general aviation airport, Jim Kelly Field.

== Education ==
It is in the Lexington Public Schools school district.

== Notable people ==
- Bill Barrett (1929–2016) – U.S. representative for Nebraska
- Aage Brix (1894–1963) – soccer player and 1924 Olympian
- Yoskar Galván-Mercado (born 2003) – soccer player
- Monte Kiffin (1940–2024) – gridiron football player and coach
- Donald Roe Ross (1922–2013) – judge for the Eighth Circuit and mayor of Lexington
- Wee Willie Smith (1910–1996) – National Football League (NFL) player
- Mick Tingelhoff (1940–2021) – NFL player
- John Wightman (1938–2017) – Nebraska state politician and mayor of Lexington

== See also ==
- Impact of the 2019–20 coronavirus pandemic on the meat industry in the United States
