= A Cavalryman =

Painting by Alphonse de Neuville

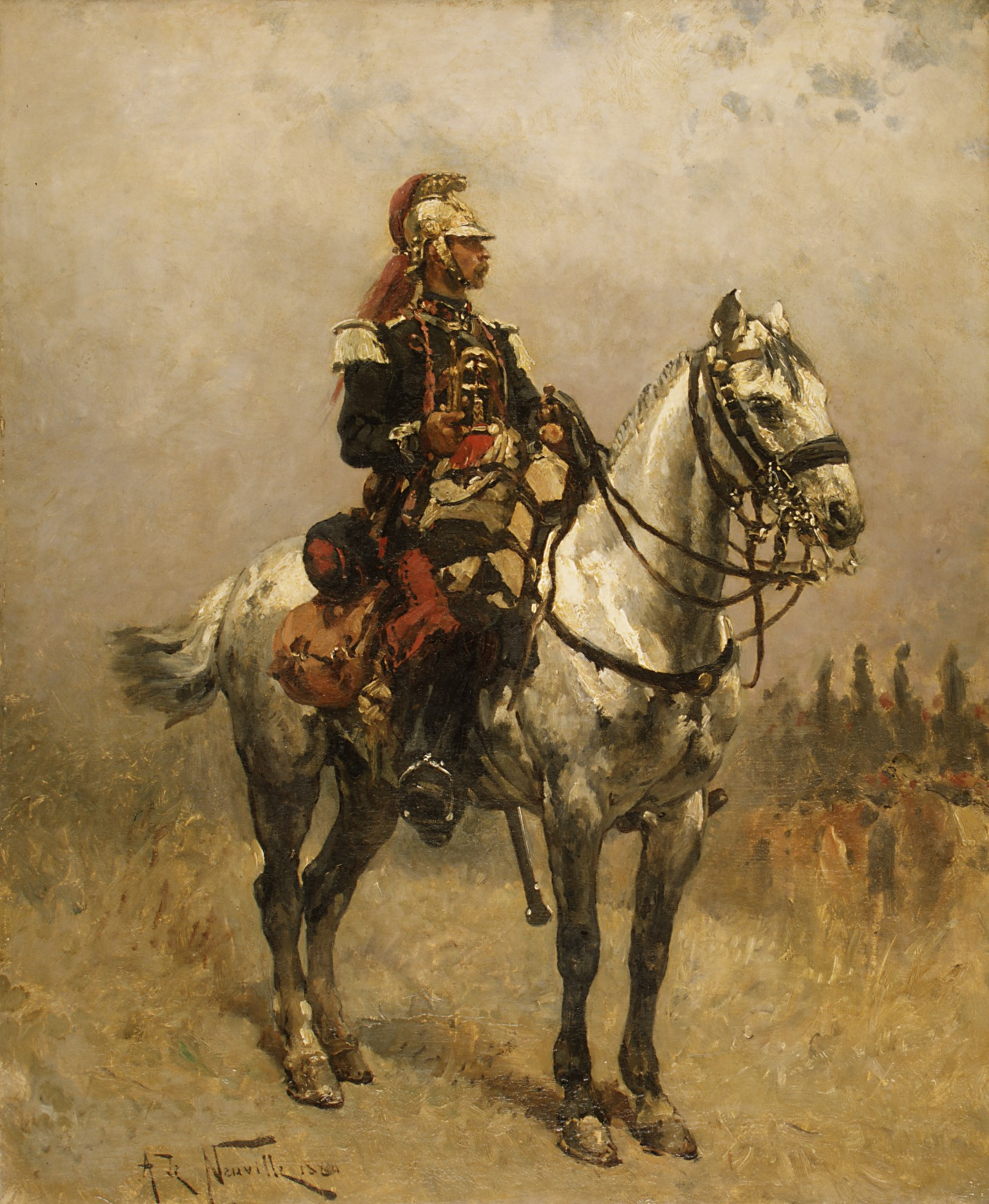
- Artist: Alphonse de Neuville
- Year: 1884
- Medium: Oil on canvas
- Dimensions: 46 cm × 38.1 cm (18 in × 15.0 in)
- Location: Metropolitan Museum of Art; New York

A Cavalryman is an oil on canvas painting by French artist Alphonse-Marie-Adolphe de Neuville, from 1884. It depicts a French cavalryman on a yellow field. The work is in the collection of the Metropolitan Museum of Art, in New York.

== Description ==
A Cavalryman depicts a French dragoon of either the First or Second French Empires. Dragoons were mounted infantry capable of riding into on an engagement on horses before dismounting to engage enemy forces on foot; this important role, coupled with the cost of horses, resulted in dragoons being known as elite-but-expensive troops. Some sources identify the painting subject as a trumpeter.

Dragoons became a subject of various works of military art, including the works of the painter Ernest Meissonier, whose style De Neuville directly emulated in the current painting. The canvas itself was produced after the French defeat in the Franco-Prussian War resulted in an upsurge of interest in the military in the French Third Republic. As noted by the Metropolitan Museum of Art, De Neuville "capitalized on the intense patriotism and dreams of military glory that the French defeat aroused" with his work.
