= Heartland Museum of Military Vehicles =

Heartland Museum of Military Vehicles (HMMV)

- Location of the museum Heartland Museum of Military Vehicles (the United States)
- Established: 1986
- Location: 606 Heartland Road, Lexington, Nebraska, United States
- Coordinates: 40.742833°N 99.737092°W
- Type: Military museum
- Website: heartlandmuseum.com

The Heartland Museum of Military Vehicles (HMMV) is located next to the northeast exit 237 of Interstate 80 in Lexington, Nebraska, United States. It is a non-profit organization run by volunteers and funded by donations and grants.

== History ==
In 1986, four Lexington men founded the Heartland Museum.

In 1991, a permanent site for the museum was obtained at exit 237 of Interstate 80 (its current location).

In 1998, a 16,000-square-foot (1,500 m^{2}) visitor center was constructed which houses many of the vehicles.

== Collection ==
The museum has about 100 vehicles including helicopters, tanks, half-tracks, ambulances, and a jeep from every branch of the service. There are also displays of weapons, uniforms, engines, equipment, and more. The everyday necessities of a soldier's life, such as MREs, and unique vehicles, like those used by the German army in World War II.

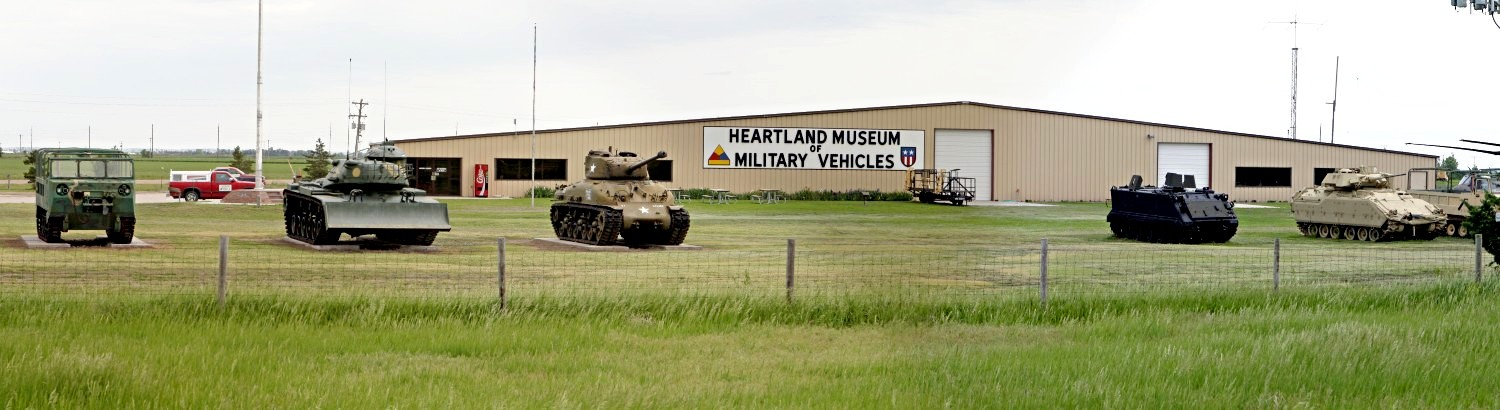
View from Interstate 80 exit showing five of the vehicles outside

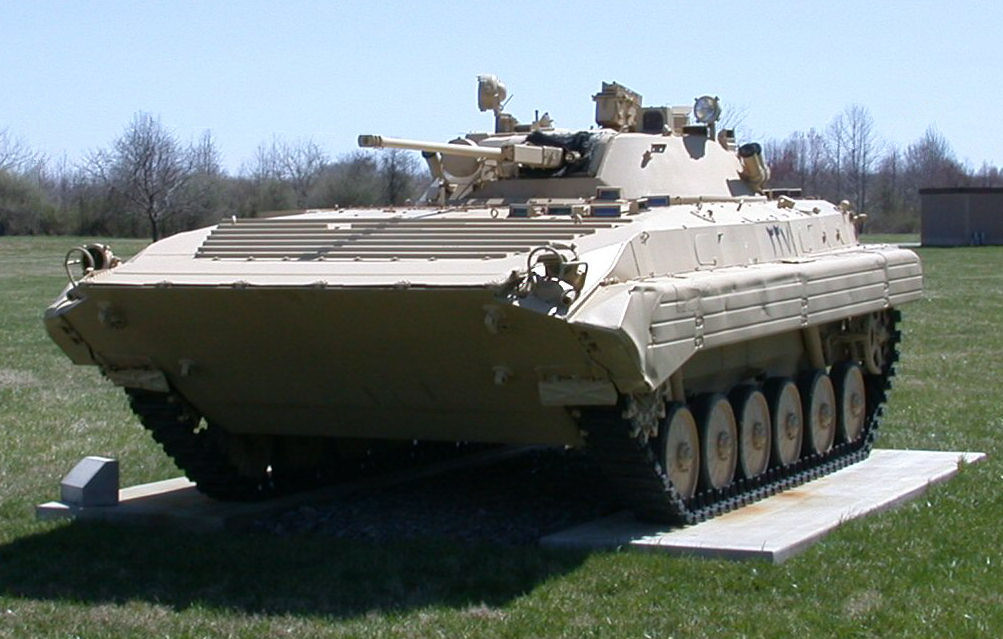
Soviet BMP-1 MICV

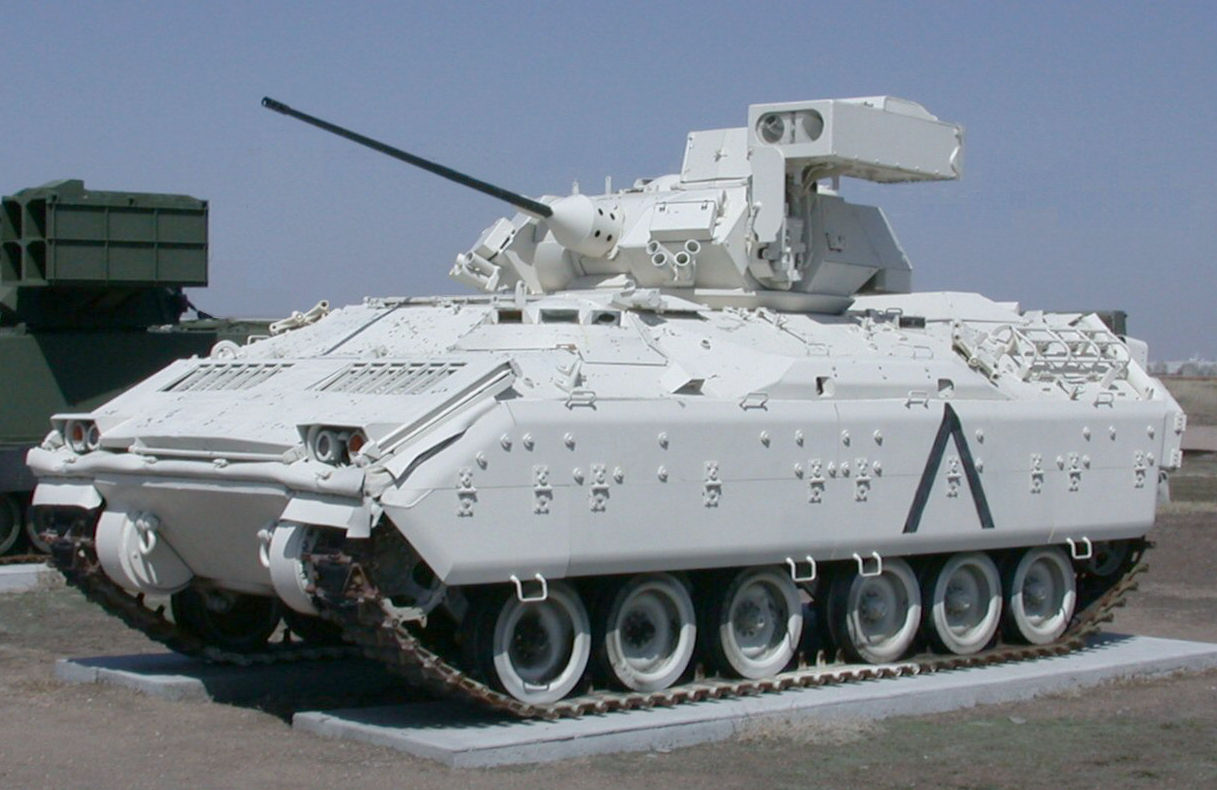
Bradley MICV
