= The Attack at Dawn =

Painting by Alphonse de Neuville

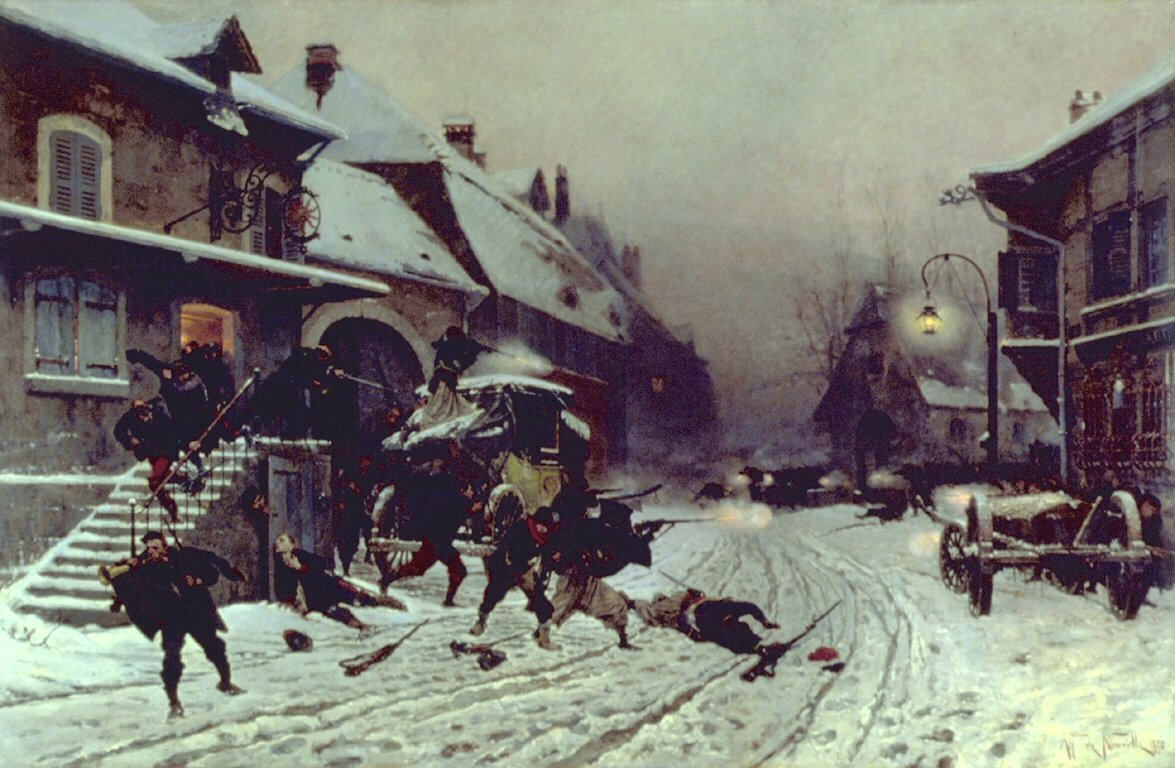
- Artist: Alphonse de Neuville
- Year: 1877
- Medium: Oil on canvas
- Dimensions: 146.5 cm × 222 cm (57.7 in × 87 in)
- Location: The Walters Art Museum; Baltimore

The Attack at Dawn is a painting by French painter Alphonse de Neuville, from 1877. The painting depicts a French town under siege by Prussian troops during the Franco-Prussian War.

== History ==
Alphonse de Neuville served as an officer in the Auxiliary Sappers and as aide-de-camp to General Callier during the Franco-Prussian War. He closely studied locations of battles and weaponry to recreate battle scenes.

== Composition ==
The Attack at Dawn is a recreation of a Prussian assault on a French village. To the left of the painting, a bugler sounds the alarm. French troops rush from the inn, their uniforms identify them as Turcos or Algerian rifleman and mobiles or members of the Garde Mobile. The mountain in the background, helps to identify the location of the scene as a village near the Jura Mountains, located near the Swiss border.

== Analysis ==
The paintings of de Neuville attempt to glorify France's heroic resistance rather than its military defeat.

== Off the Wall ==
The Attack at Dawn was featured in Off the Wall, an open-air exhibition on the streets of Baltimore, Maryland. A reproduction of the painting, the original is part of The Walters Art Museum collection, was on display at Federal Hill Park. The National Gallery in London began the concept of bringing art out of doors in 2007 and the Detroit Institute of Art introduced the concept in the U.S.. The Off the Wall reproductions of the Walters' paintings were done on weather-resistant vinyl and include a description of the painting and a QR code for smart phones.
