= Aage Brix =

American soccer player

Personal information
- Full name: Aage Emil Brix
- Date of birth: December 9, 1894
- Place of birth: Lexington, Nebraska, United States
- Date of death: March 16, 1963 (aged 68)
- Place of death: Los Angeles, California, United States
- Position: Forward

Senior career*
Years	Team	Apps	(Gls)
- Los Angeles Athletic Club

International career
1924	United States	1	(0)
- * Club domestic league appearances and goals

Aage Brix (December 9, 1894 – March 16, 1963) was a former U.S. soccer forward who earned one cap with the U.S. national team at the 1924 Summer Olympics. The U.S. won the game, 1–0 against Estonia, its first game of the Olympics. Brix, a doctor, played as an amateur with the Los Angeles Athletic Club's soccer team. During the game against Estonia, he punctured his liver, ending his international career.

He was born in Lexington, Nebraska and died in Los Angeles, California.
