= KRVN (AM) =

- Lexington, Nebraska; United States
- Broadcast area: Grand Island-Kearney-Hastings-Cozad-Gothenburg
- Frequency: 880 kHz
- Branding: KRVN Rural Radio

Programming
- Format: Full service

Ownership
- Owner: Nebraska Rural Radio Association
- Sister stations: KRVN-FM, KAMI

History
- First air date: 1951; 75 years ago
- Former frequencies: 1010 kHz (1951–1972)
- Call sign meaning: "Rural Voice of Nebraska"

Technical information
- Licensing authority: FCC
- Facility ID: 48002
- Class: B
- Power: 50,000 watts
- Transmitter coordinates: 40°30′57″N 99°23′47″W
- Translators: 98.5 K253CS (Grand Island); 99.7 K259DL (Burwell); 106.9 K295BI (Kearney)

Links
- Public license information: Public file; LMS
- Webcast: Listen Live
- Website: krvn.com

KRVN (880 AM) is a radio station in Lexington, Nebraska, and serving most of the rural central and western part of the state.

The station features agricultural news programming during the day and classic country at night.

KRVN is one of two 50,000-watt stations in Nebraska, the other being KFAB in Omaha. It is the second-most powerful station in the state; unlike KFAB, it is not a clear-channel, Class A station, but it does operate on a clear-channel frequency, on which WHSQ in New York City is the dominant station. KRVN broadcasts from a four-tower antenna array located in the middle of cornfields near Holdrege, Nebraska. KRVN is Nebraska's primary entry point station for the Emergency Alert System.

Due to its transmitter power and central Nebraska's flat land (with near-perfect ground conductivity), KRVN boasts one of the largest coverage areas in the Western United States. During the day, tower #3 radiates the transmitter's full power to almost all of Nebraska's densely populated area, as well as more than half of Kansas and northeastern Colorado. At night, power is fed to all four towers to provide a directional signal aimed to the west to protect WHSQ. This results in the second-largest city within its coverage area, Kearney, only getting a grade B signal; a translator at 106.9 FM is used to make up for this shortfall. Even with this arrangement, it is able to cover western Nebraska, northwestern Kansas, northeastern Colorado, and most of the Dakotas.

KRVN is a member of the Nebraska Cornhuskers radio network.

The KRVN network is unique in that it is owned and operated by a cooperative of farmers and ranchers, the Nebraska Rural Radio Association. It was founded in 1948, opening its first station, KRVN, in 1951. It was originally located at 1010 AM, broadcasting with 10,000 watts. In 1972, it moved to its current frequency and boosted its transmitting power to 50,000 watts; the lower dial position and stronger transmitter enabled it to serve more of central Nebraska's farmers.

The NRRA launched a sister music station with a similar callsign, KRVN-FM (River 93.1), in 1962.

== History ==
The station's origin is unique. The idea for a farmer and rancher-owned radio station was sparked by the severe blizzards of 1948-1949, which highlighted a critical need for timely news and weather information to prevent loss of life and livestock across the thinly populated state. The station was established and is still owned by the Nebraska Rural Radio Association (NRRA), which was incorporated in 1948. The cooperative sold over 4,000 ownership certificates at $10 each to farmers and ranchers across the state to fund the station's launch. KRVN first signed on the air on February 1, 1951, broadcasting on 1010 kHz with an operating power of 25,000 watts. In 1962, the NRRA applied to the FCC for the 880 kHz clear channel signal and a power increase to 50,000 watts. KRVN officially went full-time on 880 with 50,000 watts on March 6, 1972.
