= KRVN-FM =

- Lexington, Nebraska; United States
- Broadcast area: Grand Island–Kearney, Nebraska
- Frequency: 93.1 MHz (HD Radio)
- Branding: River 93.1

Programming
- Format: Country
- Affiliations: Fox News Radio

Ownership
- Owner: Nebraska Rural Radio Association
- Sister stations: KRVN (AM), KAMI

History
- First air date: November 1962
- Call sign meaning: "Rural Voice of Nebraska"

Technical information
- Licensing authority: FCC
- Facility ID: 48001
- Class: C1
- ERP: 100,000 watts
- HAAT: 271.2 meters (890 ft)
- Transmitter coordinates: 40°41′48.00″N 99°47′18.00″W

Links
- Public license information: Public file; LMS
- Website: krvn.com

KRVN-FM (93.1 MHz, "River 93.1") is a country formatted radio station licensed to Lexington, Nebraska, United States. The station serves the Grand Island-Kearney area broadcasting from an 890-foot tower in Lexington, Nebraska. The station was established in November 1962 by the Nebraska Rural Radio Association, the farmer-rancher cooperative that opened KRVN, an AM agricultural news station, in 1951, and since acquired a network of stations across Nebraska. KRVN-FM is a radio partner of University of Nebraska-Kearney (UNK) Athletics.

== History ==
On November 23, 1962, just three weeks after its initial sign-on, the original tower collapsed due to a storm. A new tower was installed and brought the station back on the air on July 1, 1963. Less than a year later, on June 22, 1964, a tornado tore off the top 400 feet of the structure. The station went down again when the 600-foot tower collapsed in January 1969, and a storm took it down yet another tower on October 30, 1971. The station finally returned to the air with a stable 50,000 watts on May 27, 1976. KRVN-FM went to 100,000 watts in January 1984.
