= Alphonse de Neuville =

French painter

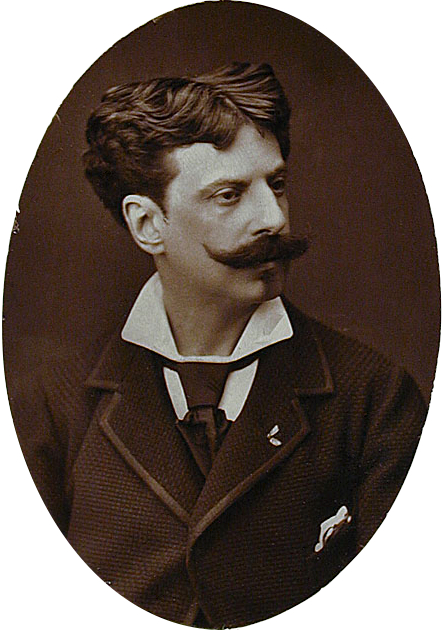
- Alphonse de Neuville in a Woodburytype (c. 1880)
- Born: Alphonse-Marie-Adolphe de Neuville; 31 May 1835; Saint-Omer, France
- Died: 18 May 1885 (aged 49); Paris, France
- Known for: Painting
- Movement: Academic art

Alphonse-Marie-Adolphe de Neuville (French: [alfɔ̃s maʁi adɔlf də nøvil]; 31 May 1835 – 18 May 1885) was a French academic painter who studied under Eugène Delacroix. His dramatic and intensely patriotic subjects illustrated episodes from the Franco-Prussian War (1870-71), the Crimean War (1853-56), the Second French intervention in Mexico (1861-67), the Anglo-Zulu War (1879), and portraits of soldiers. Some of his works have been collected by the Hermitage Museum in St. Petersburg, by the Metropolitan Museum in New York, by the Musée d'Orsay and by the Army Museum at the Invalides, both in Paris.

== Early life ==
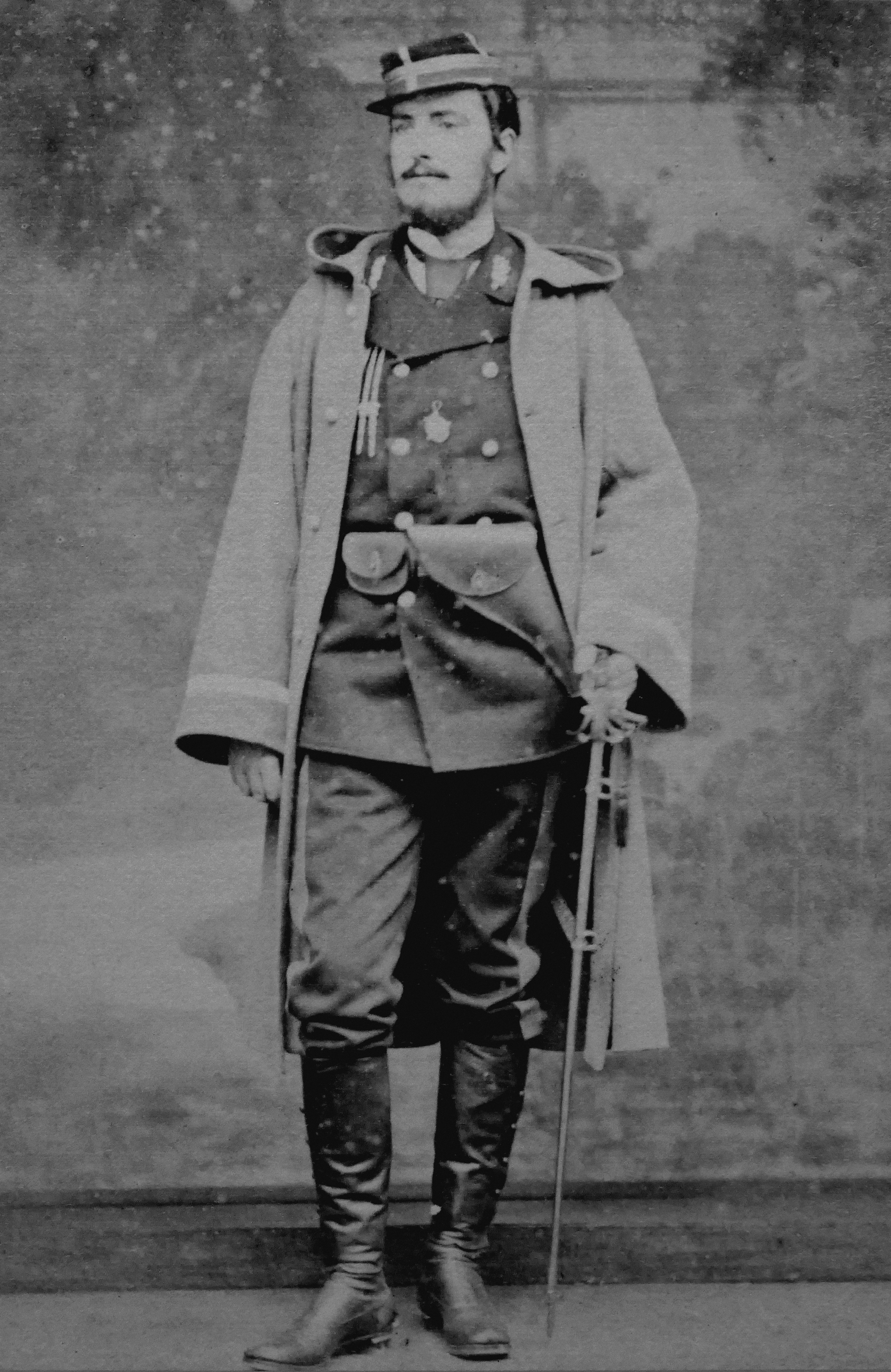
Neuville in a National Guard uniform in 1870–1871.

Born Alphonse-Marie-Adolphe Deneuville to wealthy parents at Saint-Omer, Pas-de-Calais, he earned his degree of bachelier ès-lettres, and in 1856 entered the naval school at Lorient in spite of family opposition. It was there that his artistic instincts started.

The young Alphonse de Neuville was discouraged by several painters of repute, but he was admitted to work in the studio of François-Edouard Picot. He did not remain there long. He was already painting by himself when he produced his first picture, The Fifth Battalion of Chasseurs at the Gervais Battery (Malakoff). In 1860, Neuville painted an Episode of the taking of Naples by Garibaldi for the Artists' Club in the rue de Provence in Paris. In 1861, he sent The Guard Chasseurs in the Trenches of the Mamelon Vert to the Paris Salon.

== Illustrator and military artist ==
Neuville participated in illustrating Pierre-Jules Hetzel's editions of Twenty Thousand Leagues Under the Seas by Jules Verne. He also illustrated Le Tour du monde and François Guizot's History of France. At the same time he painted a number of remarkable pictures: The Attack in the Streets of Magenta by Zouaves and the Light Horse (1864), A Zouave Sentinel (1865), The Battle of San Lorenzo (1867), and Dismounted Cavalry crossing the Tchernaia (1869). In these he showed peculiar insight into military life.

=== Franco-Prussian War ===
He reached the peak of his career after the Franco-Prussian War of 1870-1871. The long-term French reaction was revanchism: a deep sense of bitterness, hatred, and demand for revenge against Germany, especially because of the loss of Alsace and Lorraine. Paintings that emphasized the humiliation of the defeat were in high demand, such as The Spy by de Neuville.

In response, Neuville aimed at depicting episodes of the Franco-Prussian War in his works, and began by representing the Bivouac before Le Bourget (1872). His fame spread rapidly and was increased by The Last Cartridges (1873), memorializing an episode involving the Blue Division of the French marines, in which it is easy to discern the vast difference between the conventional treatment of military subjects, as practised by Horace Vernet, and that of a man who had lived the life that he painted.

Fight on a Railroad (1874) was equally successful, and was followed by the Attack on a House at Villersexel (1875) and the Railway Bridge at Styring (1877). In 1878 (but not at the Great Exhibition), the painter exhibited Le Bourget, the Surprise at Daybreak, The Intercepted Despatch-bearer, and a considerable number of drawings. He also exhibited in London some episodes of the Zulu War. Fifty thousand people paid to see his impression of The Defence of Rorke's Drift (1880), which the infant Art Gallery of New South Wales in Sydney paid a large sum to acquire.

In 1881, he was made an officer of the Légion d'honneur for The Cemetery of Saint-Privat, The Despatch-bearer, and Huns in the Battle of Chalon. During these years Neuville was at work with Édouard Detaille on an important although less artistic work, Le Soir de Rezonville.

=== Death ===
Neuville died in Paris on May 18, 1885. At the sale of his works the state purchased the paintings Bourget and Attack on a Barricaded House, as well as watercolor The Parley and the drawing Turco in Fighting Trim, for the purpose of displaying them at the Palais du Luxembourg.

== Gallery ==
=== Paintings ===
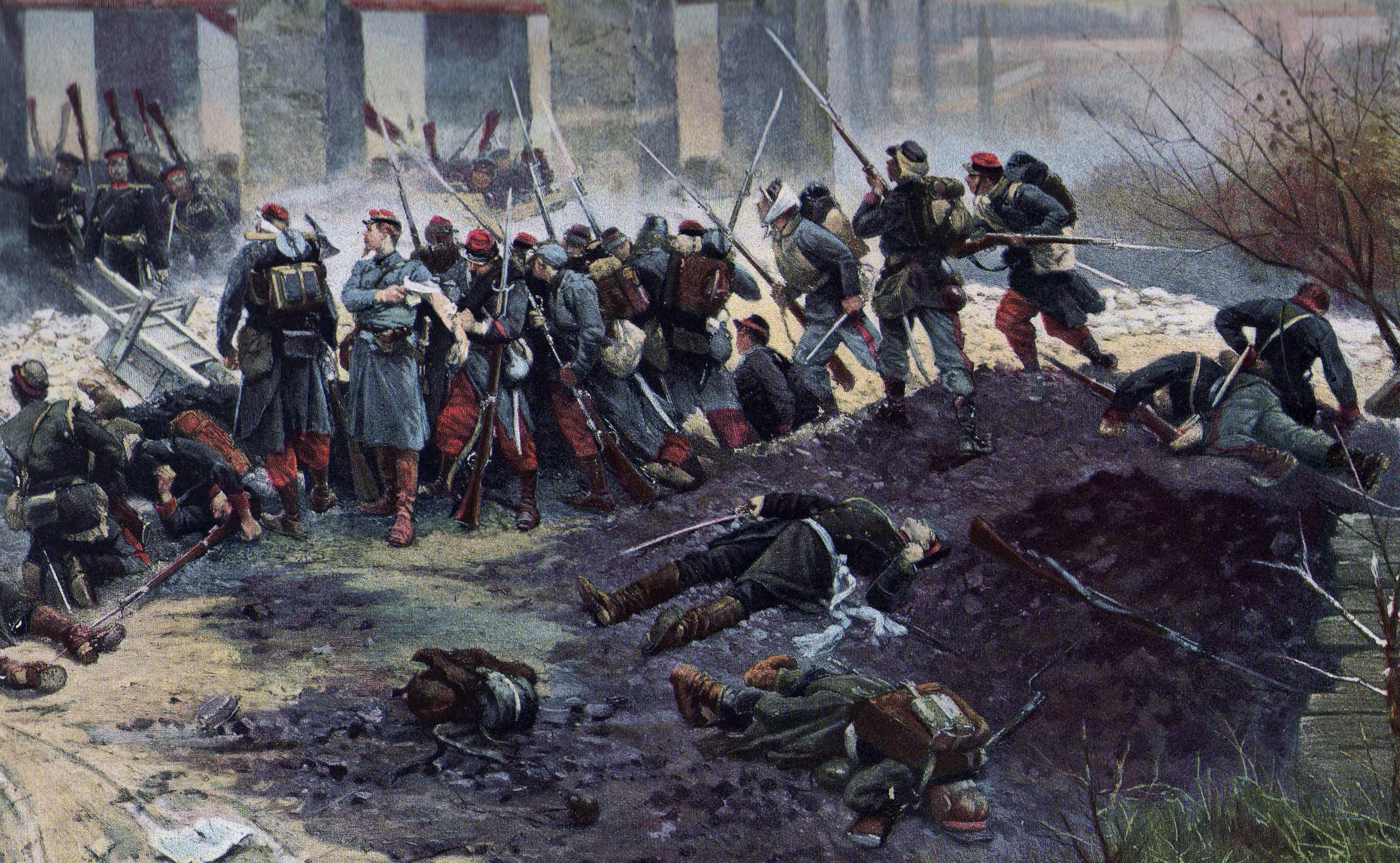
Battle of Champigny (1870)

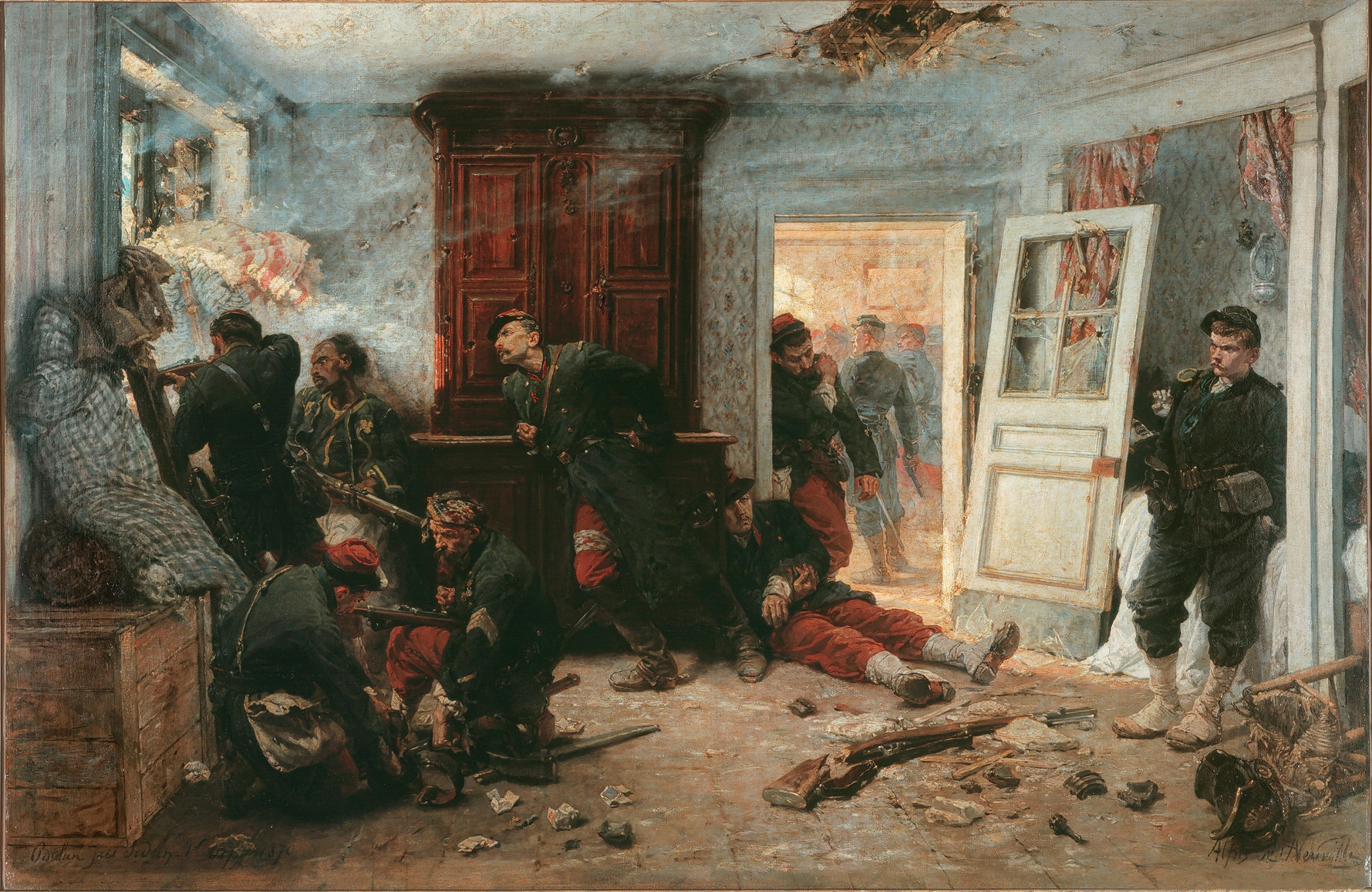
The Last Cartridges (1873)

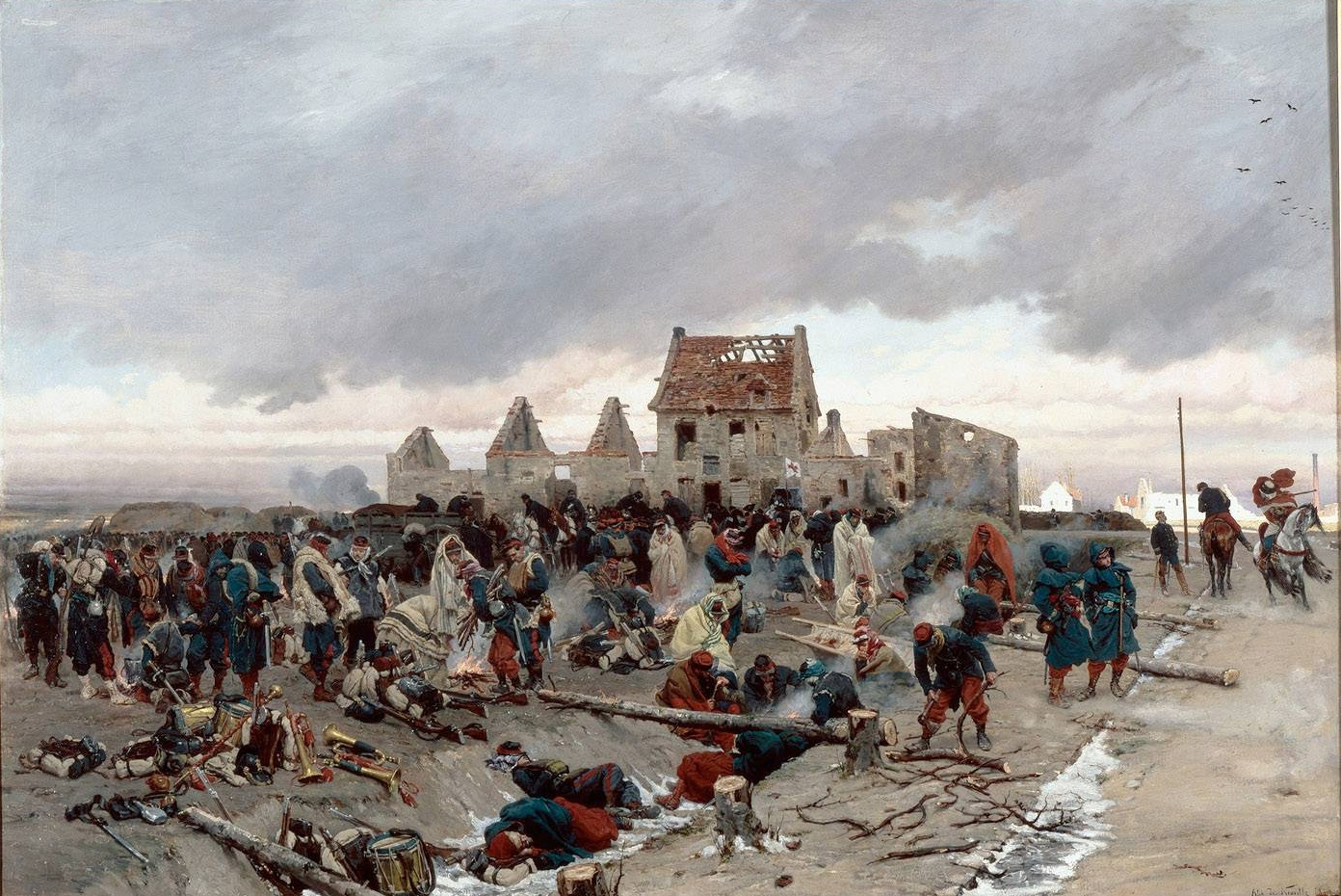
Bivouac after the Battle of Le Bourget, 21 December 1870 (1873)

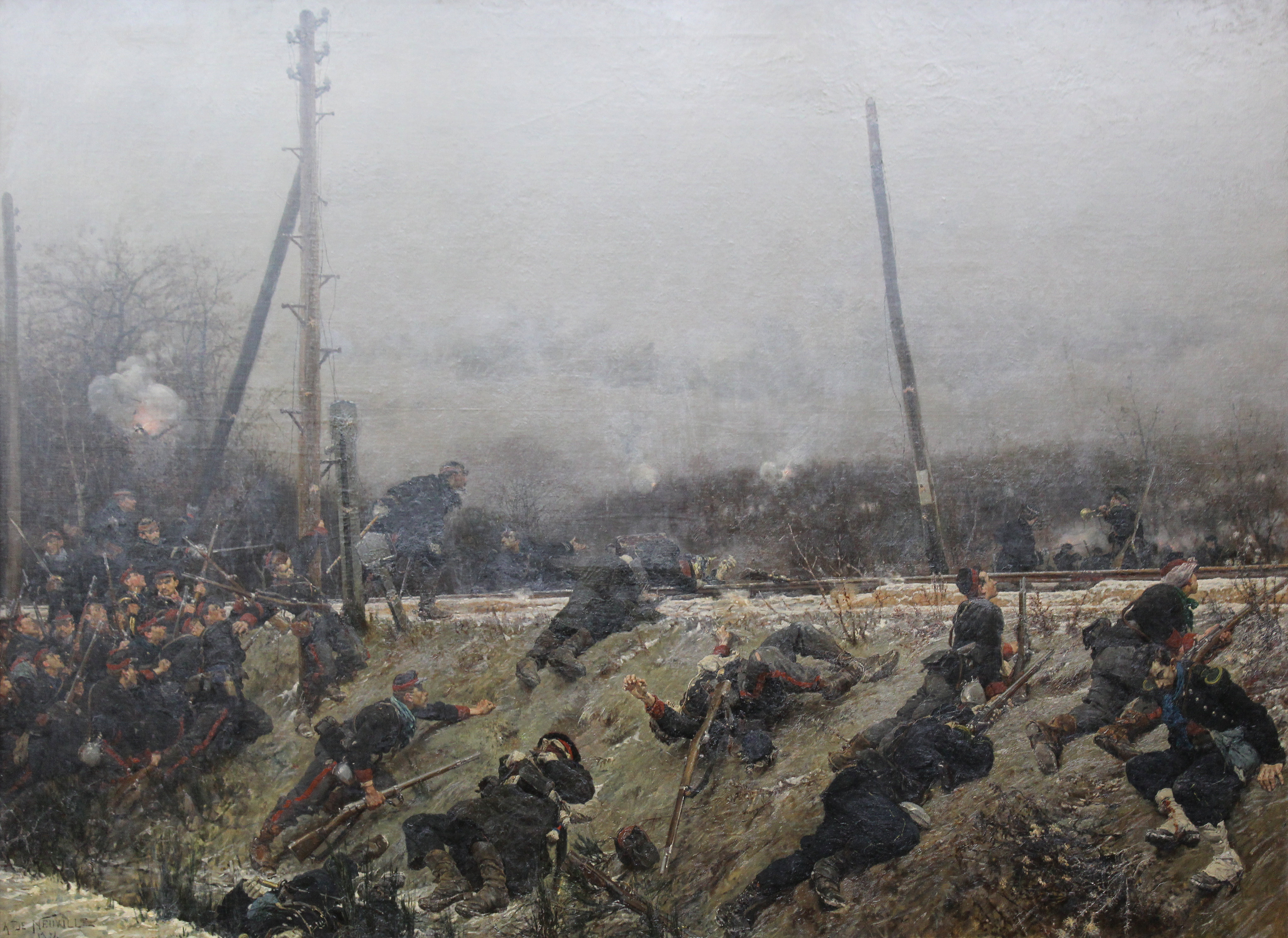
Battle at the Railway Embankment (1874)

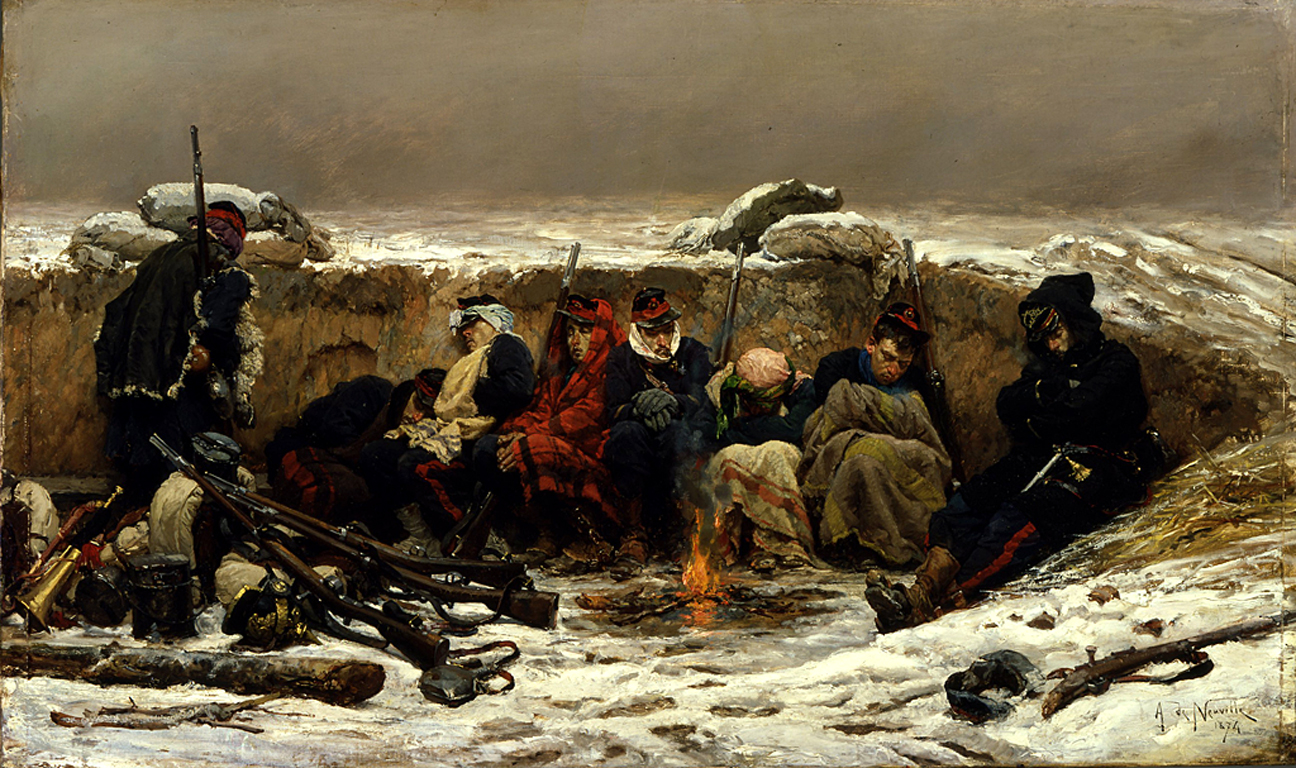
In the Trenches (1874)

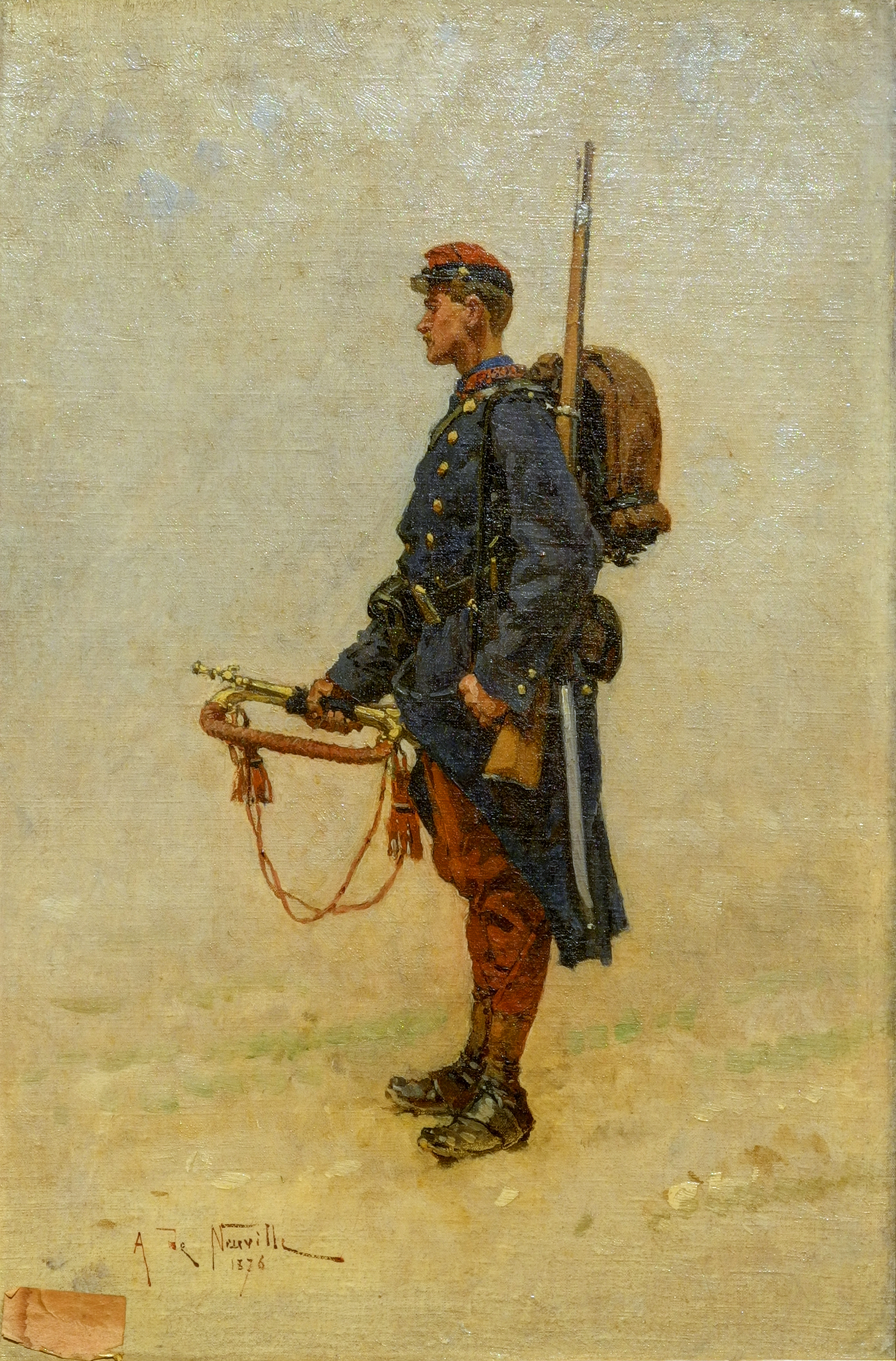
A Bugler of the Infantry (1876)

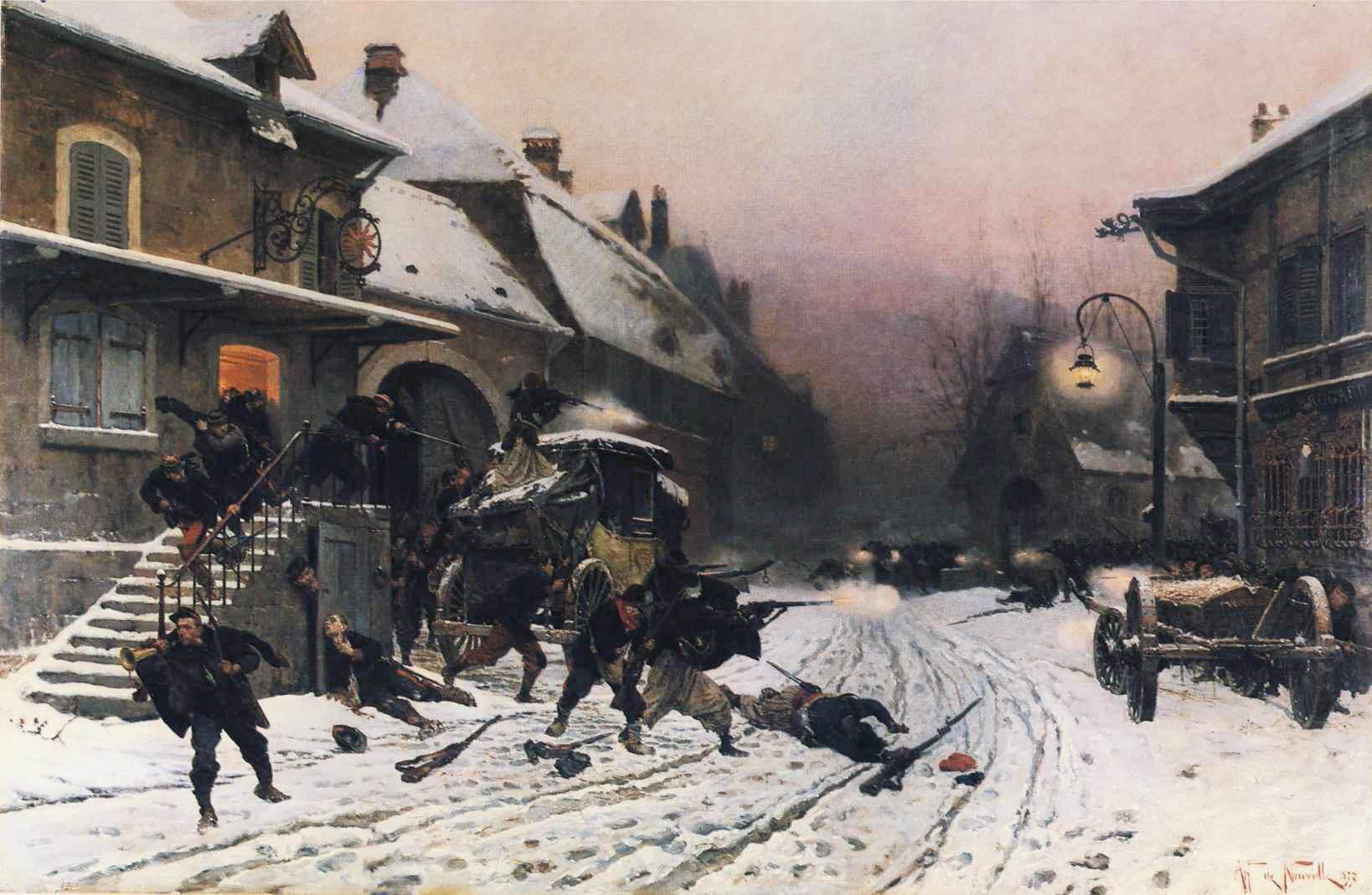
The Attack at Dawn (1877)

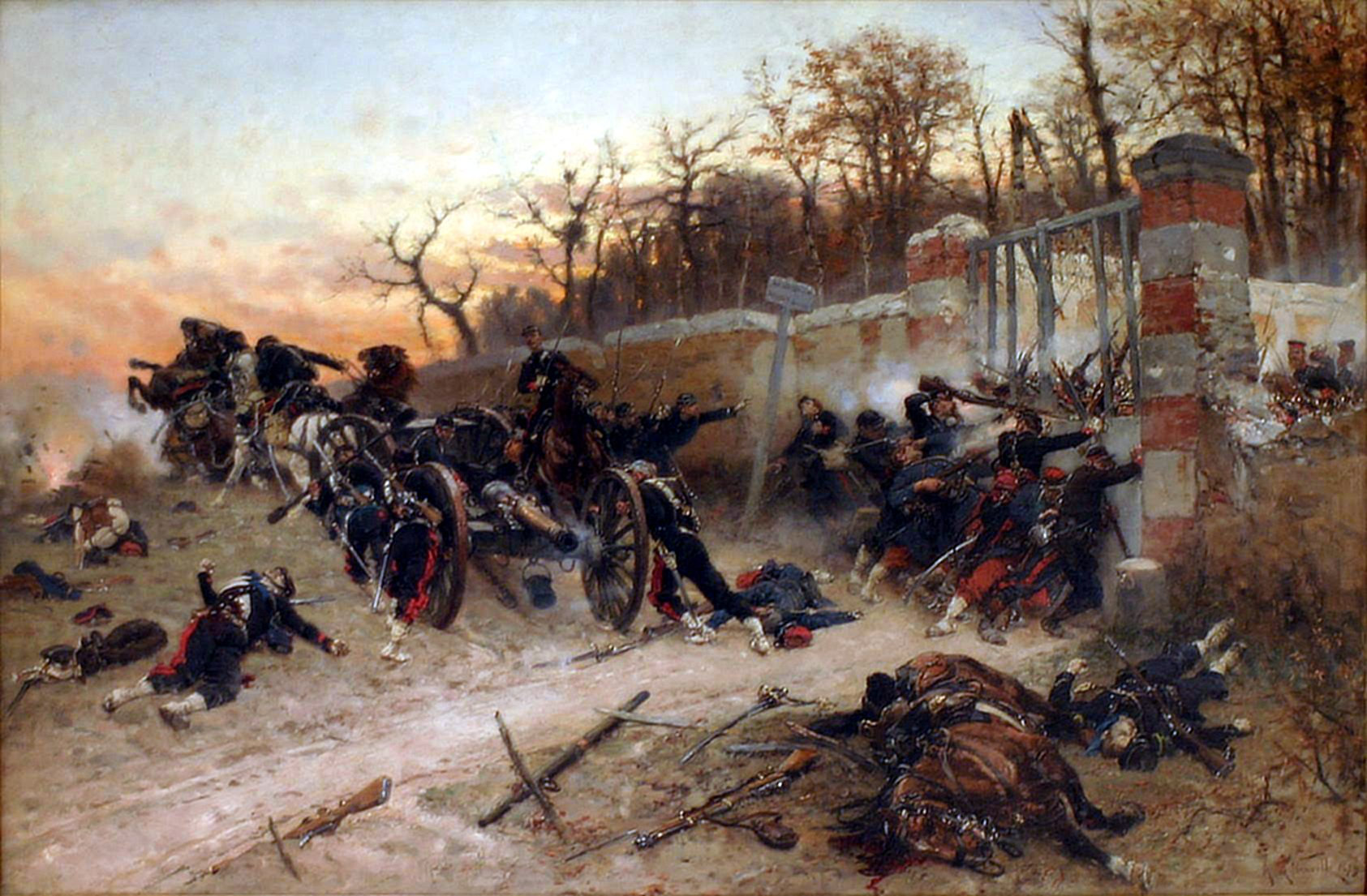
Defense of the Longboyau Gate, 21 October 1870 (1879)

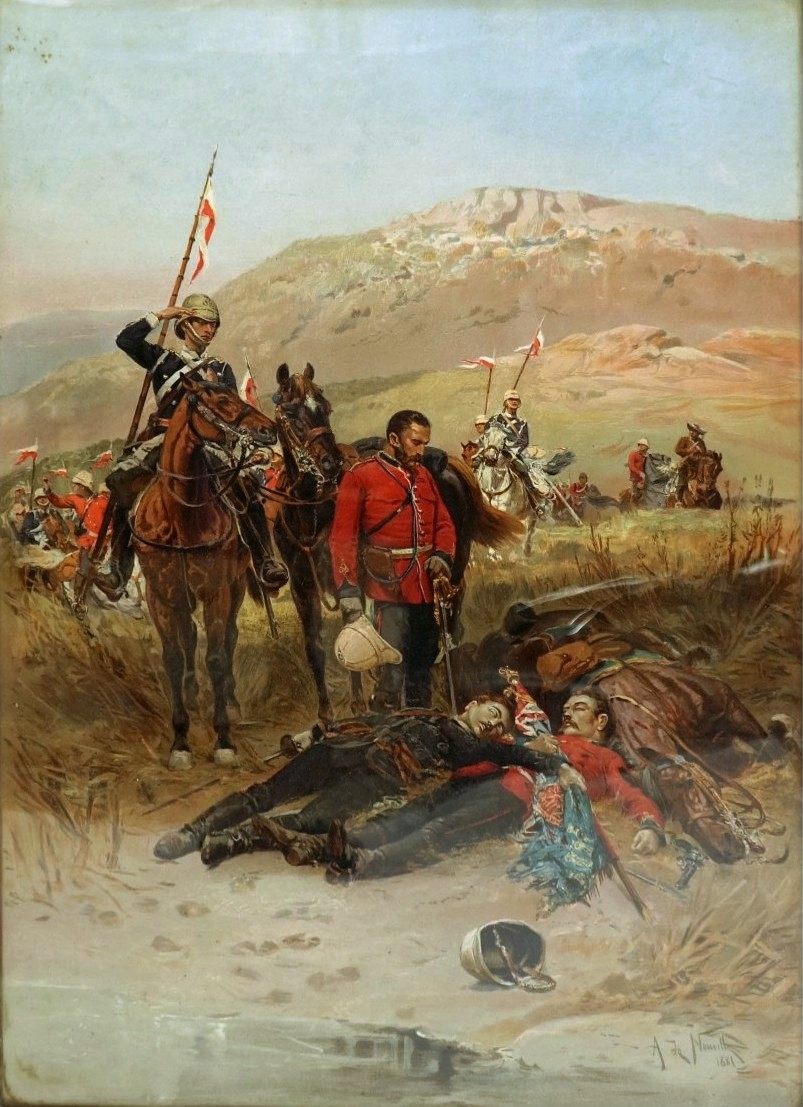
Last Sleep of the Brave (1879)

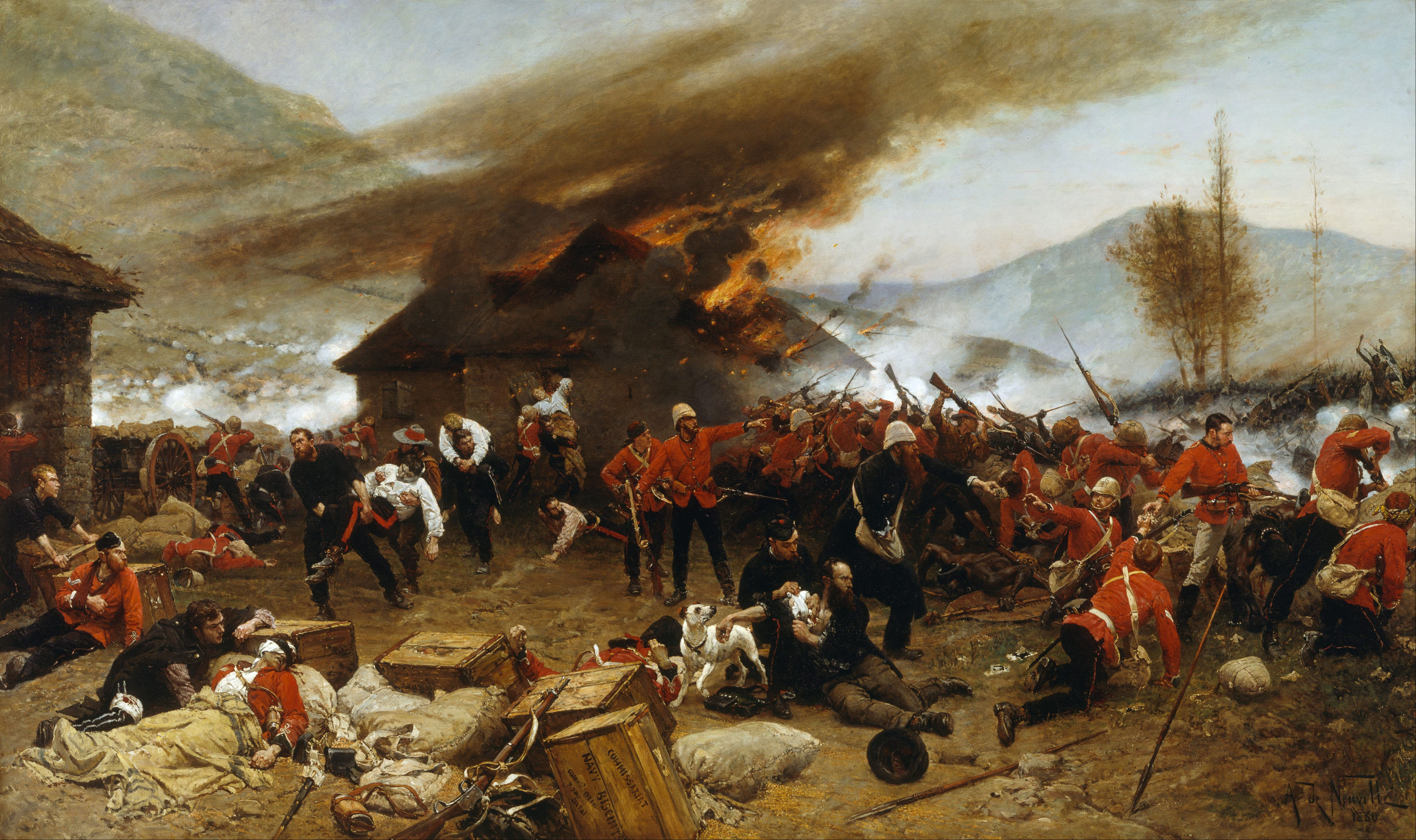
The Defence of Rorke's Drift (1880)

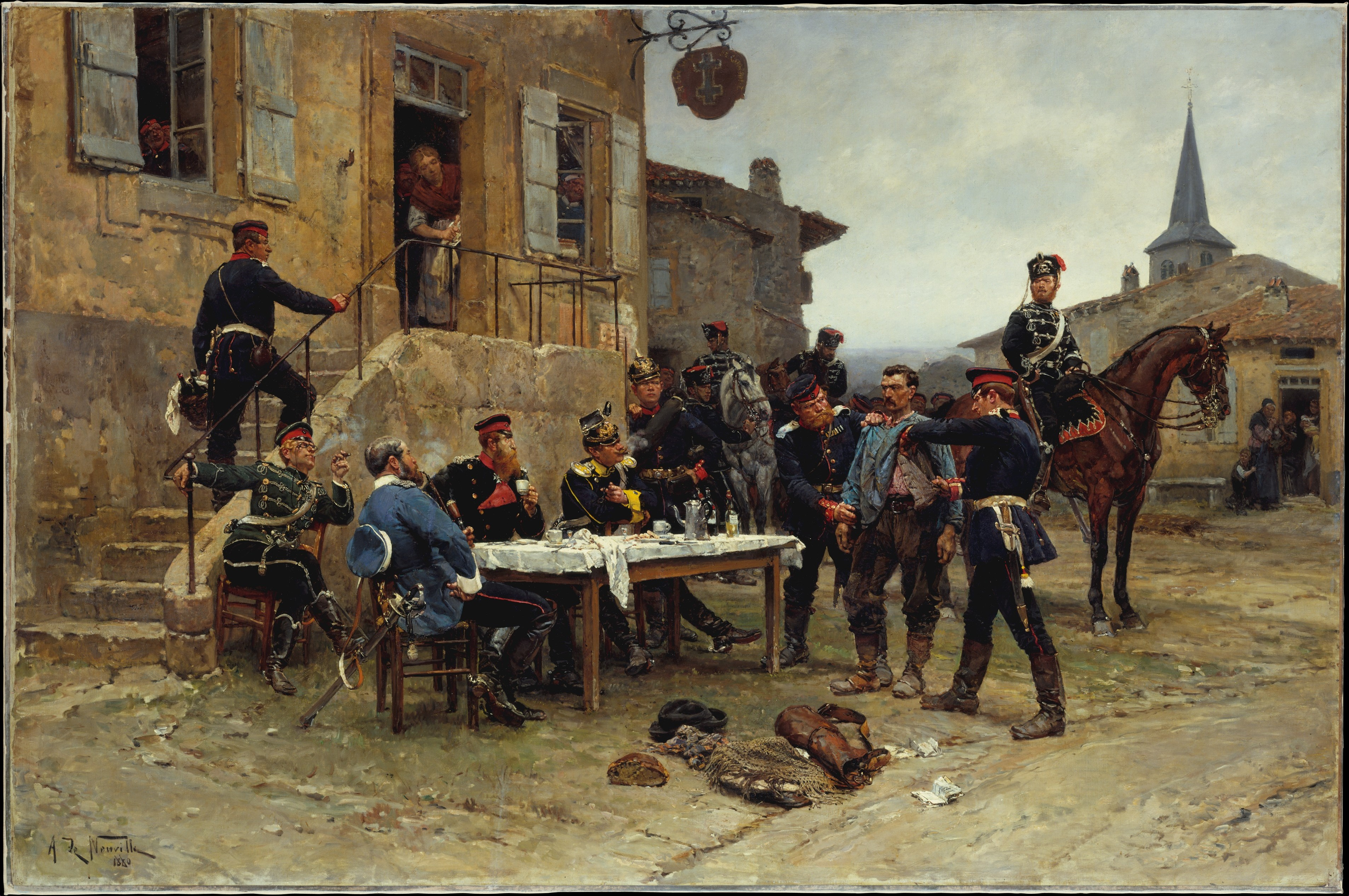
The Spy (1880)

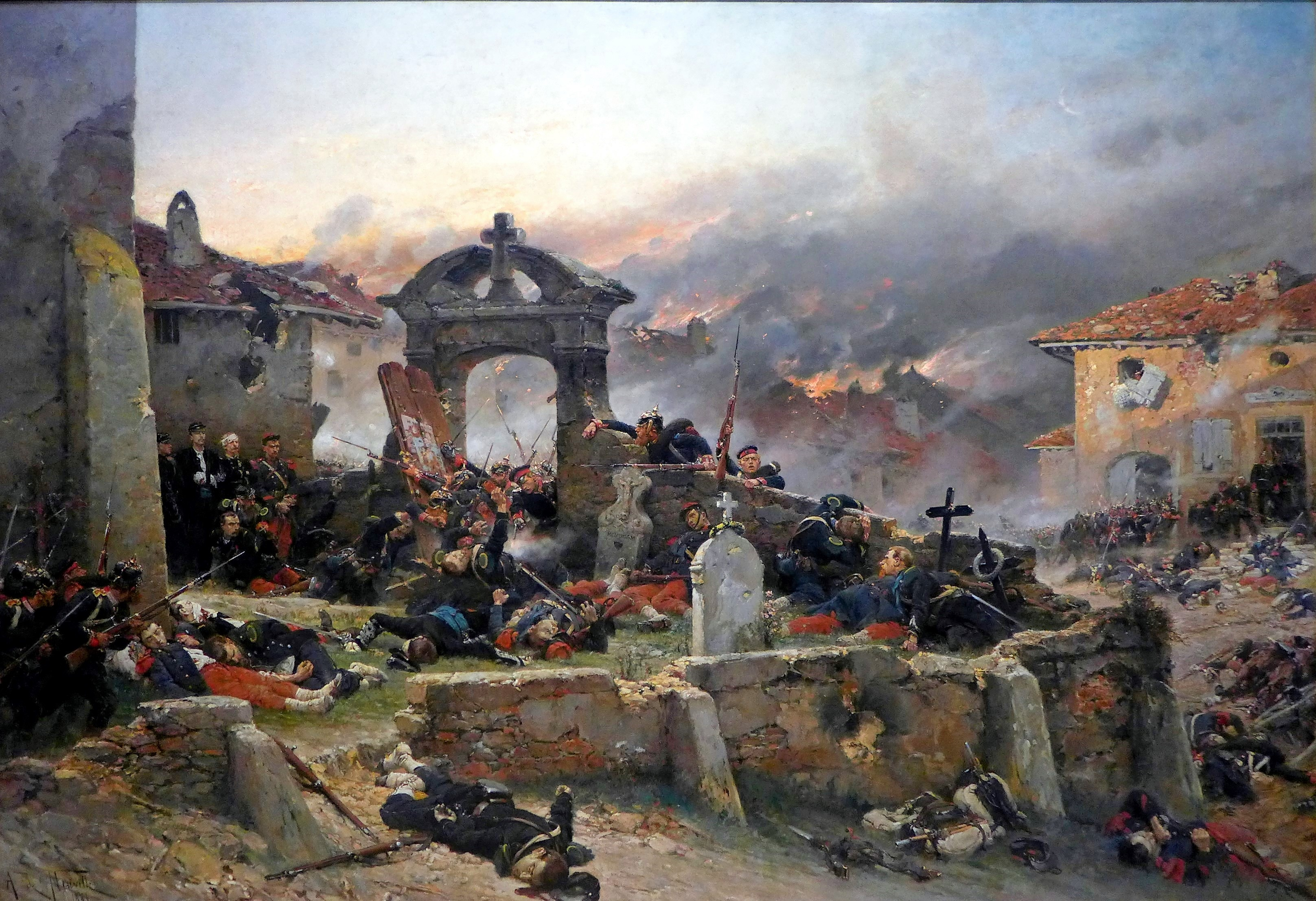
The Cemetery of Saint-Privat (1881)

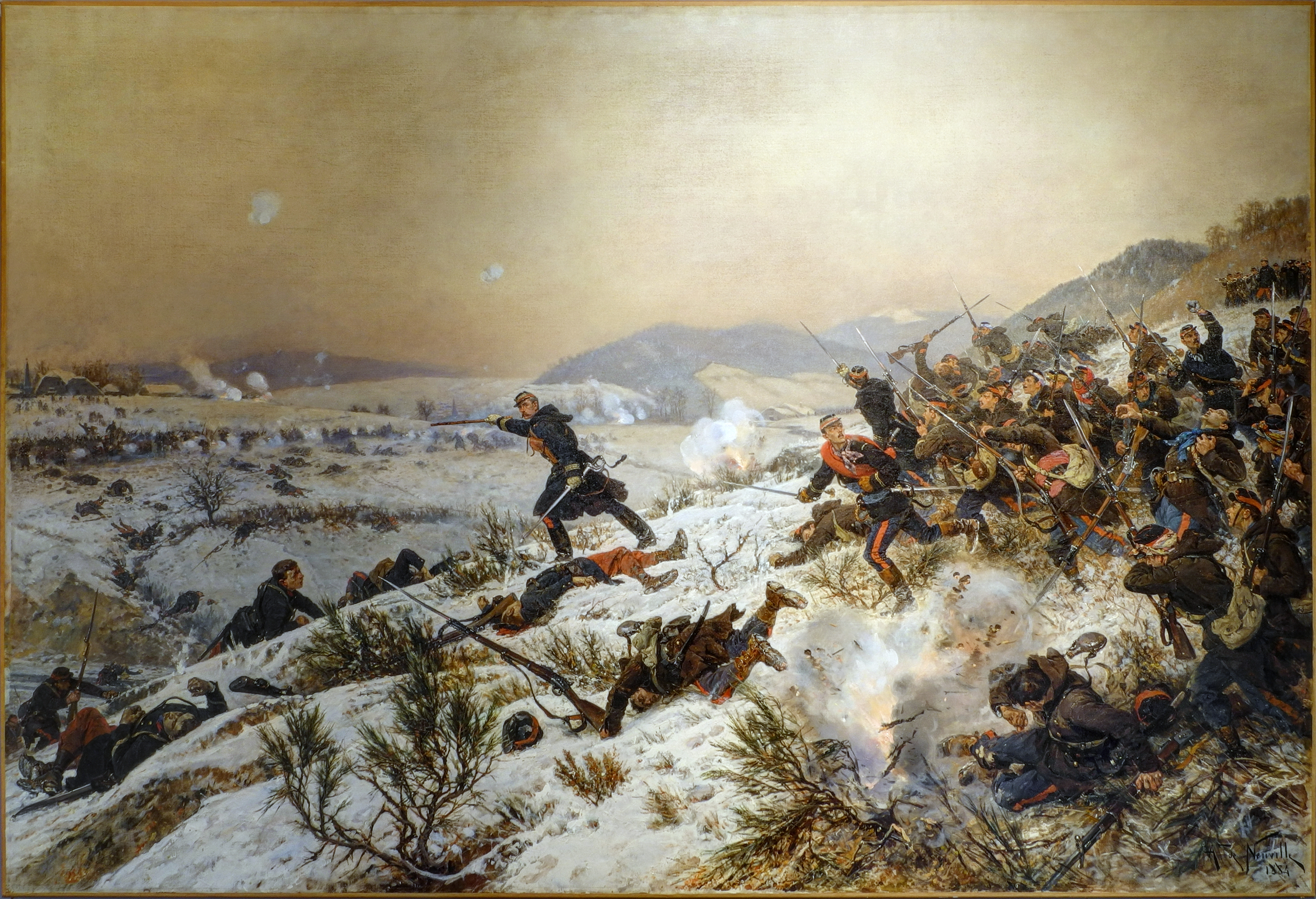
Forwards! or The Battle of Chenebier (1884)

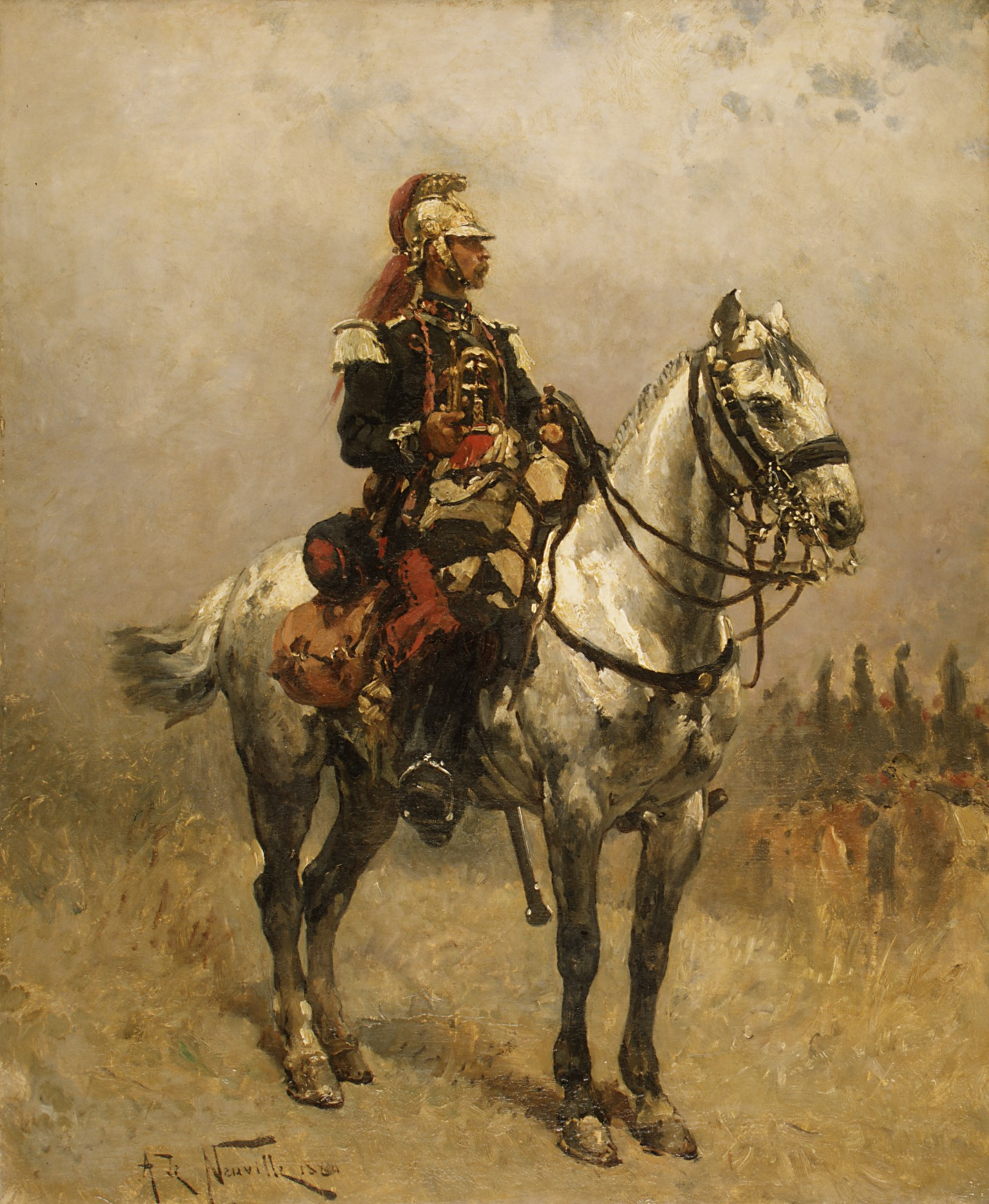
A Cavalryman (1884)

=== Illustrations ===
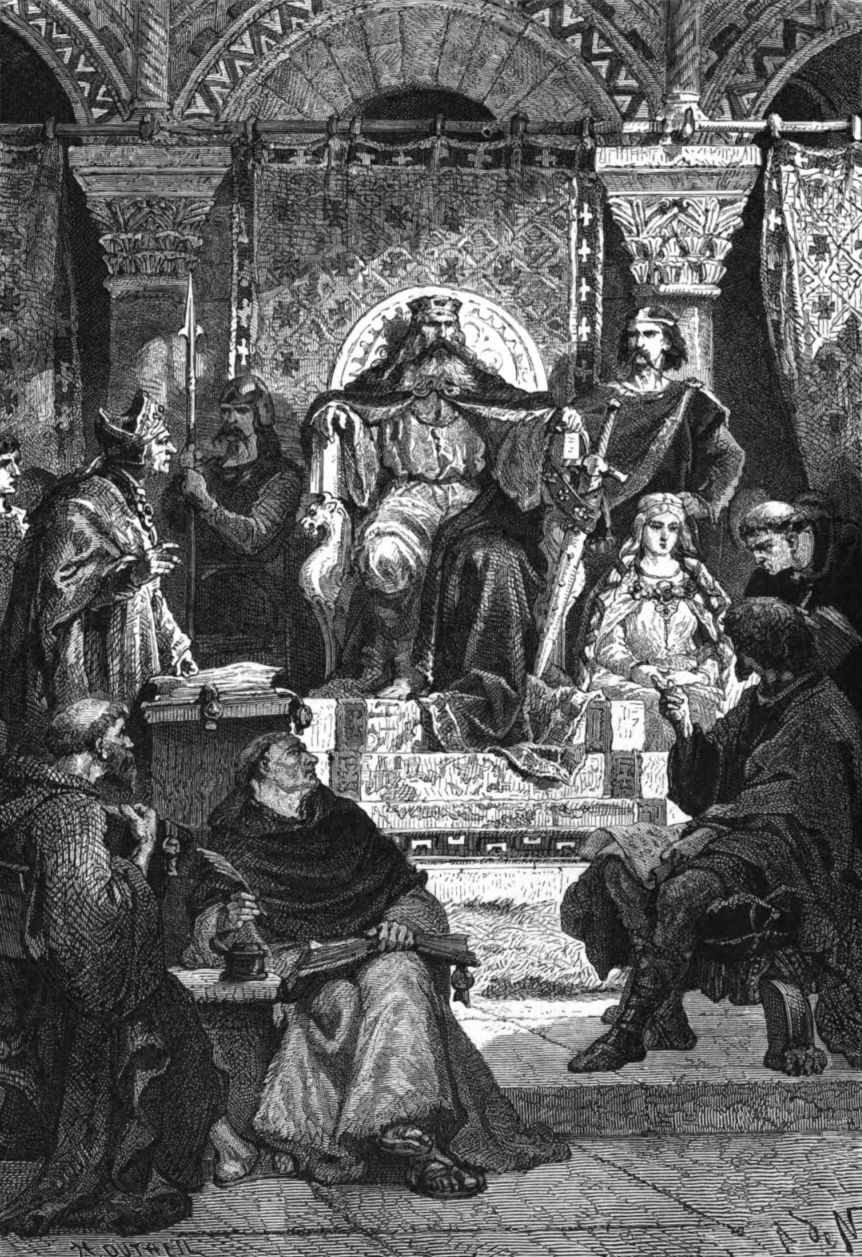
Carolingian Emperor Charlemagne presiding over the Académie palatine.

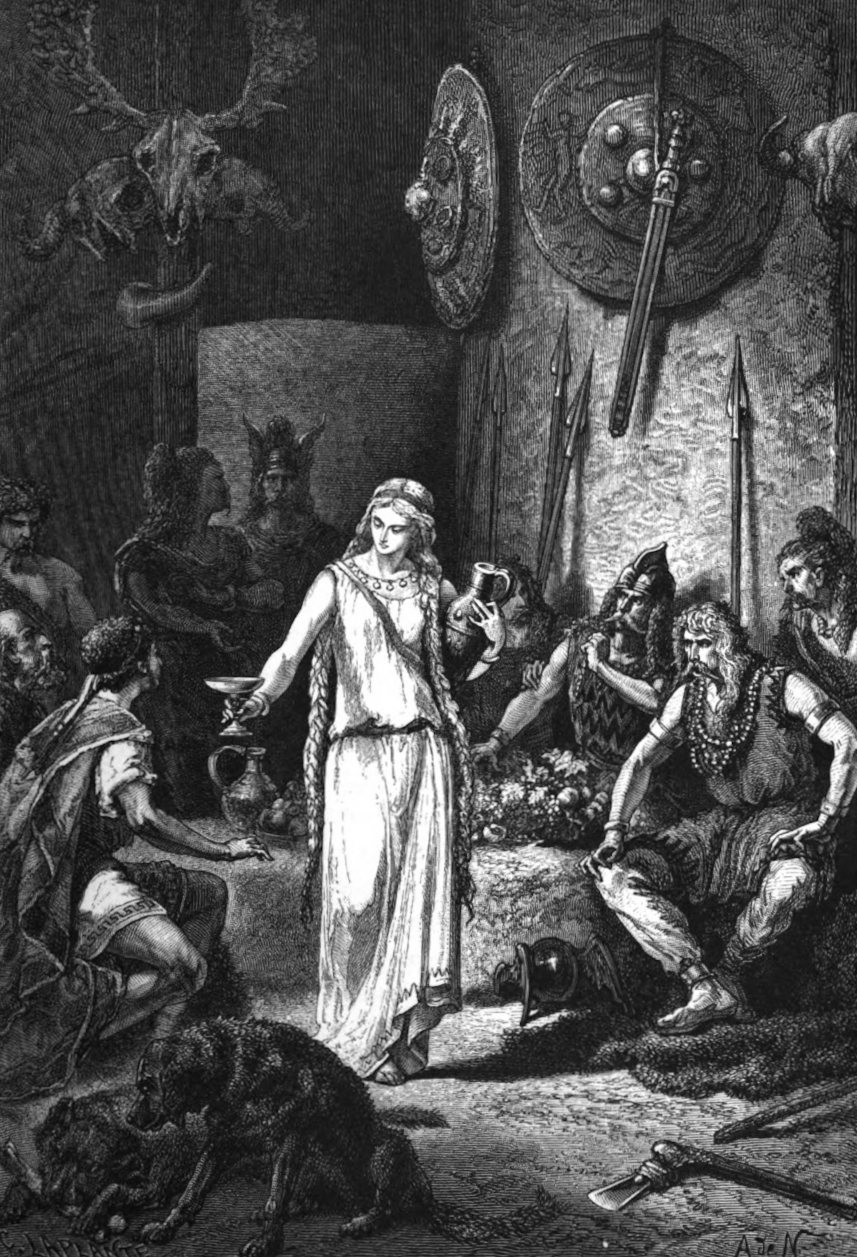
The myth of Gyptis (or Petta) offering her cup to Protis (or Euxenus), the founding myth of Marseille.

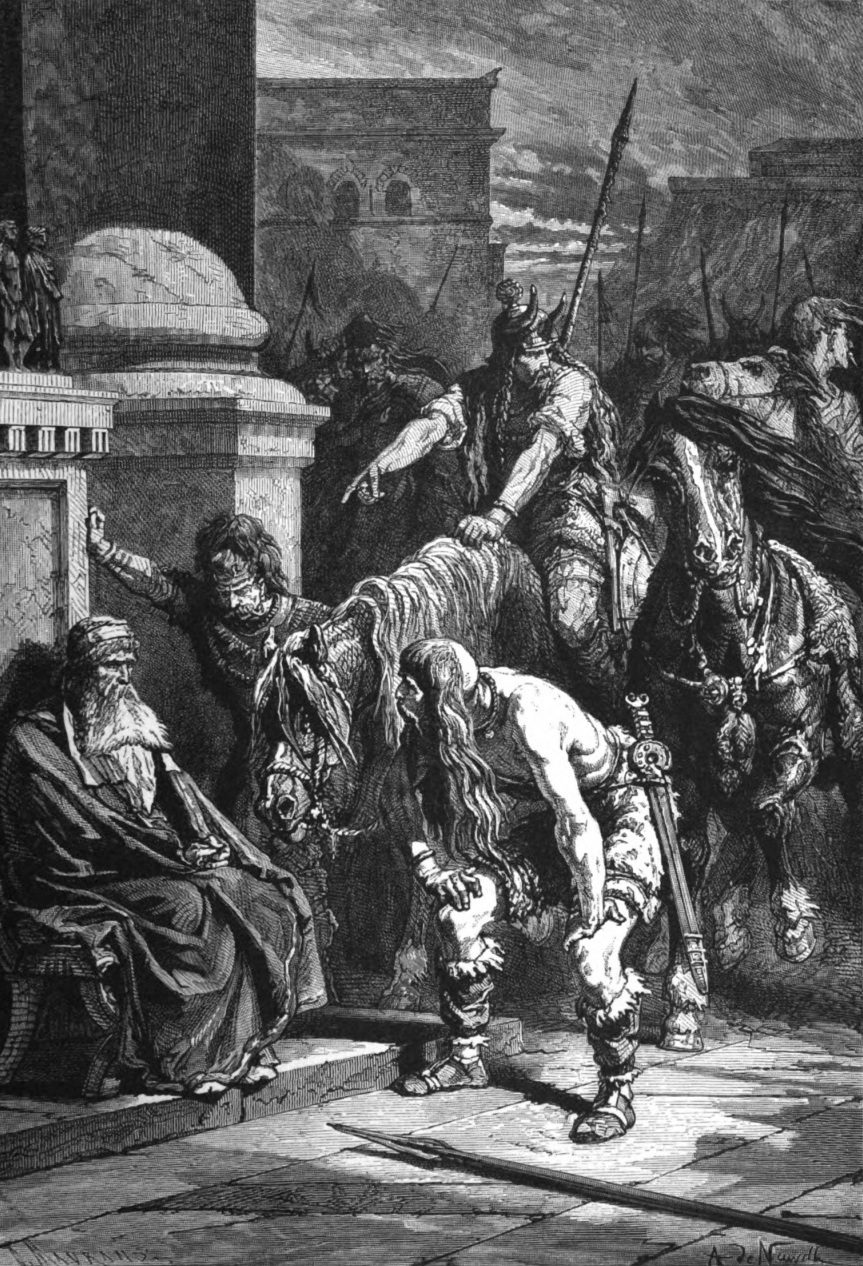
A legendary episode from the Sack of Rome (390 BC).

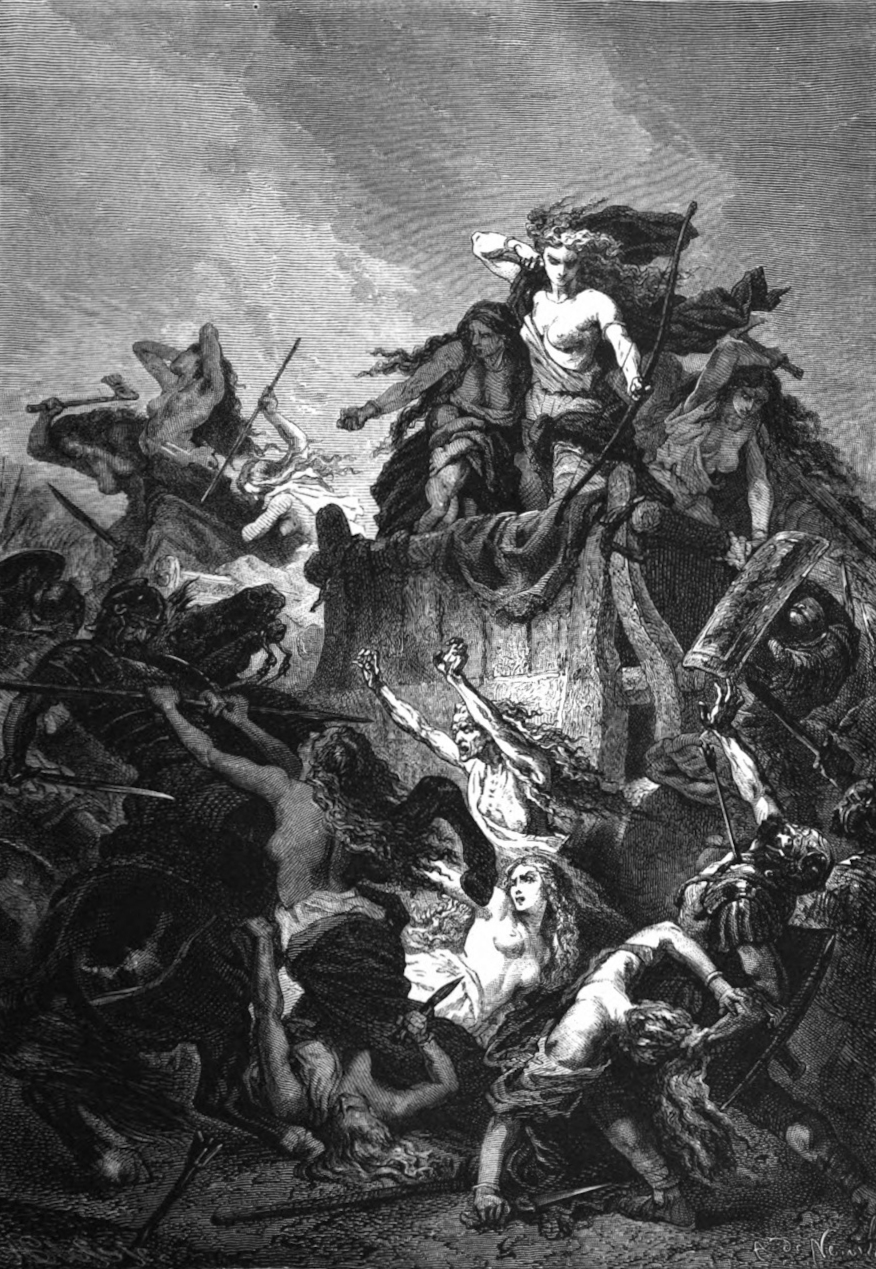
The Battle of Aquae Sextiae (today Aix-en-Provence), 102 BC, in which Marius's Romans defeated the Ambrones and Teutons.

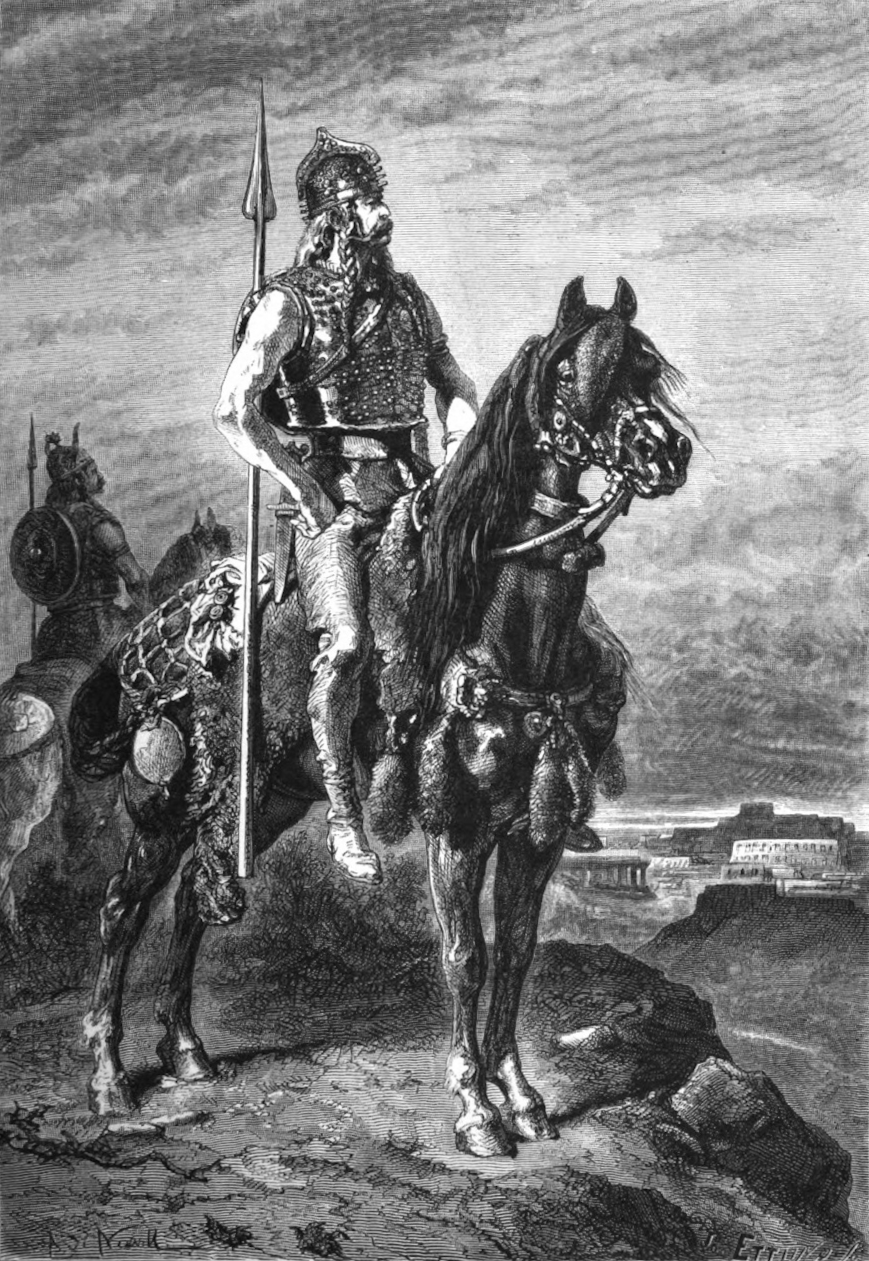
An episode from Julius Caesar's Gallic Wars.

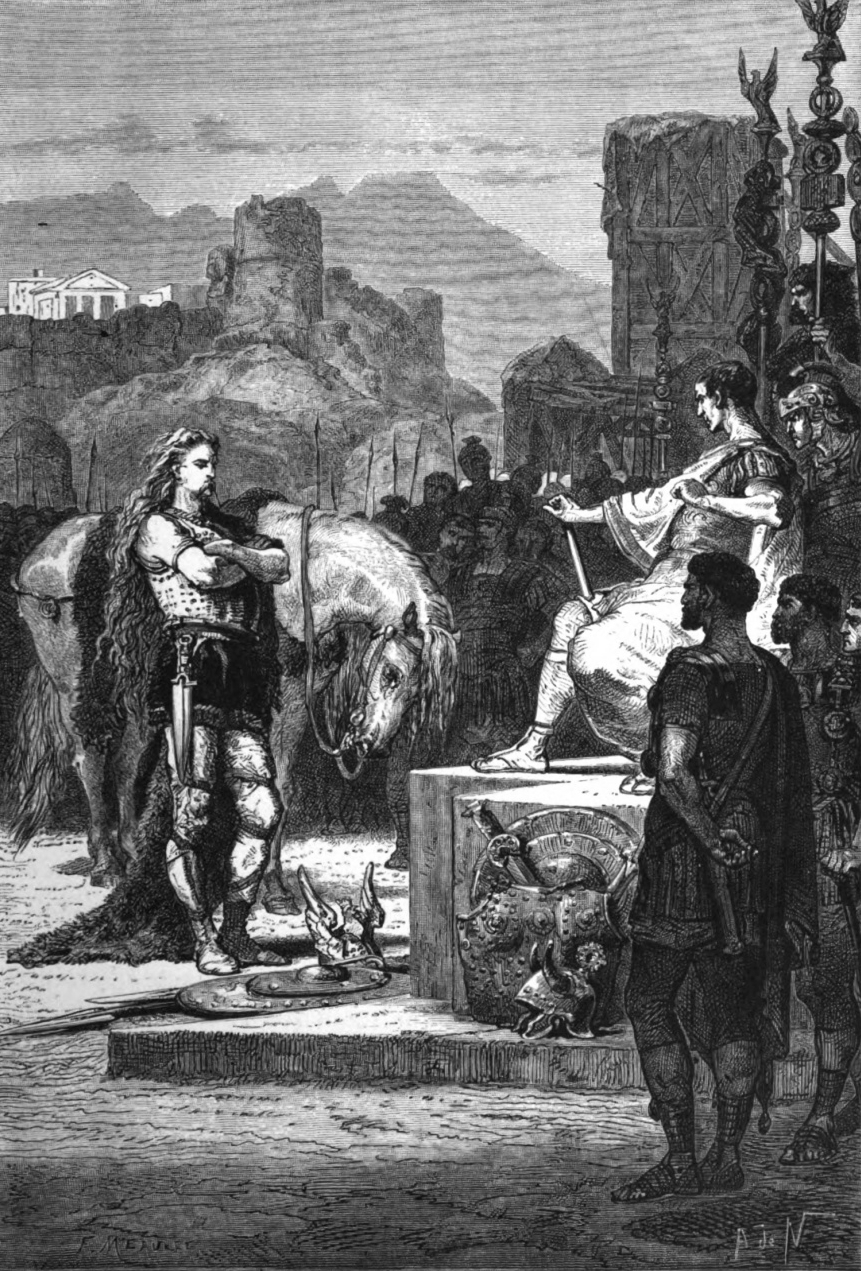
Another episode from the Gallic Wars: "Vercingetorix surrenders himself to Caesar."

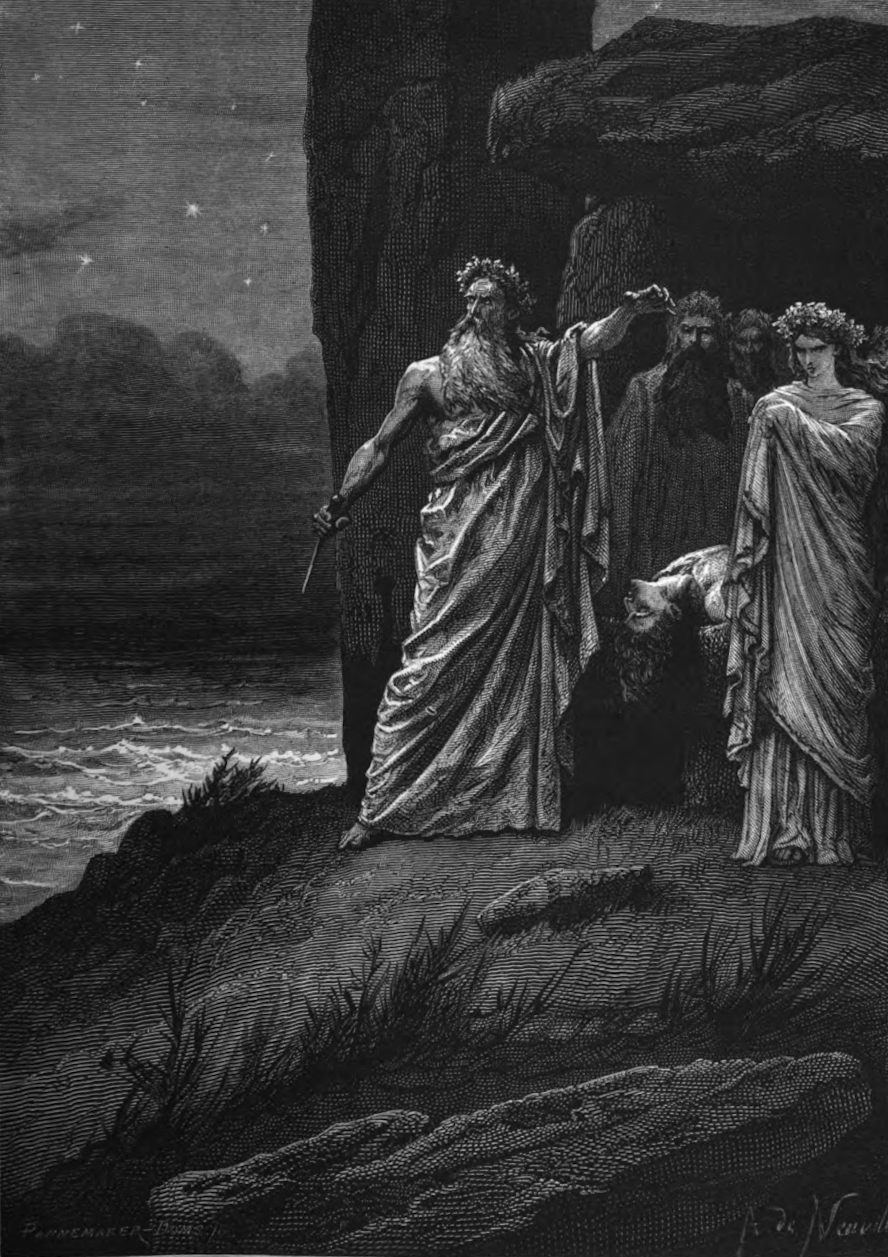
The last druids.

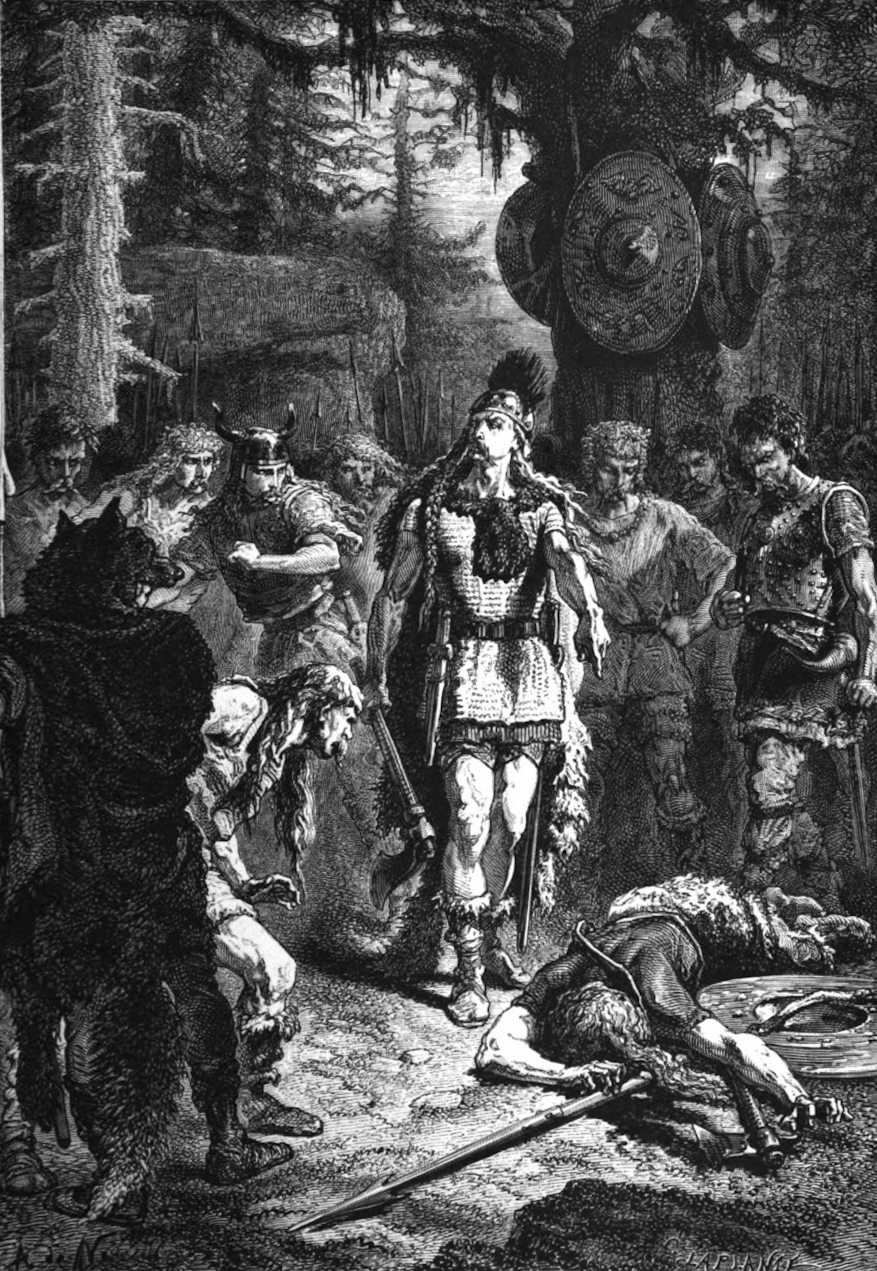
The episode of Clovis, King of the Franks, and the semi-legendary Vase of Soissons.

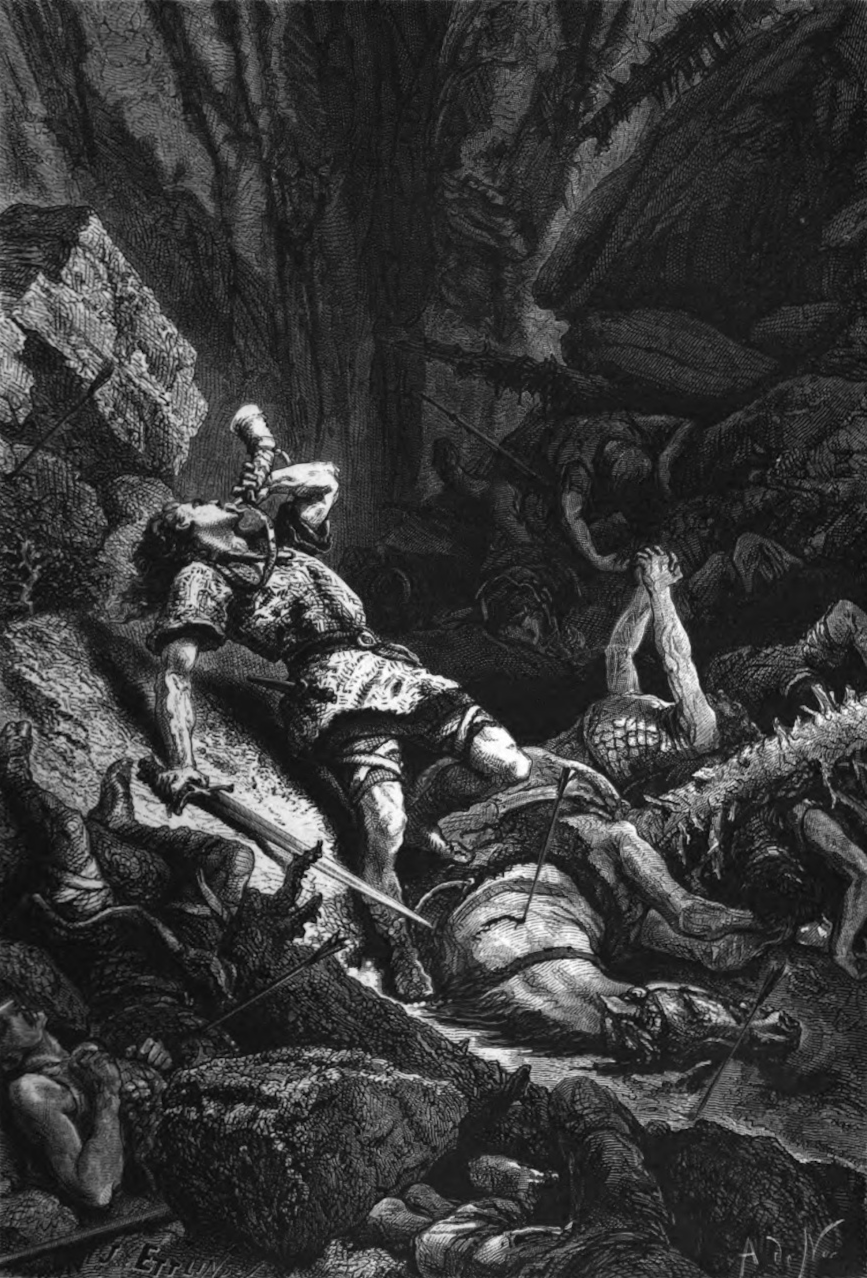
The death of Roland, Frankish commander under Emperor Charlemagne, at the Battle of Roncevaux Pass. The battle is recounted in the 11th century The Song of Roland, the oldest surviving major work of French literature, and in Orlando Furioso, one of the most celebrated works of Italian literature.

== See also ==
- Military art
- Étienne Détaille
