= National Register of Historic Places listings in Keith County, Nebraska =

Location of Keith County in Nebraska

Keith County, Nebraska, United States, has 14 properties and districts listed on the National Register of Historic Places.

The locations of National Register properties and districts for which the latitude and longitude coordinates are included below may be seen in a map.

This National Park Service list is complete through NPS recent listings posted October 30, 2026.

== Current listings ==
	Name on the Register	Image	Date listed	Location	City or town	Description
1	Alkali Station		November 14, 2016 (#16000776)	Address Restricted	Roscoe	
2	Archeological Site 25KH67		December 4, 2001 (#01001279)	Address Restricted	Paxton	
3	Archeological Site 25KH68		December 4, 2001 (#01001278)	Address Restricted	Brule	
4	Beauvais' Ranche Archeological Site		February 20, 1975 (#75001096)	Address Restricted	Brule	
5	Leonidas A. Brandhoefer Mansion	Leonidas A. Brandhoefer Mansion	October 3, 1973 (#73001065)	10th and Spruce Sts. 41°08′01″N 101°43′14″W	Ogallala	
6	California Hill	California Hill	July 15, 1974 (#74001126)	West of Brule; 41°06′02″N 101°58′54″W	Brule	
7	Diamond Springs Stage Station Site	Diamond Springs Stage Station Site	October 15, 1970 (#70000371)	1 mile west of the Brule exit on Interstate 80; 41°04′47″N 101°54′19″W	Brule	
8	Front Street	Front Street	January 6, 2015 (#14001128)	519 E. 1st St. 41°07′31″N 101°42′50″W	Ogallala	
9	Dr. Burdette and Myrna Gainsforth House	Dr. Burdette and Myrna Gainsforth House	December 5, 2002 (#02001476)	1300 East A St. 41°08′13″N 101°43′09″W	Ogallala	
10	Keystone Community Church	Keystone Community Church	January 1, 1979 (#79001447)	McGinley St. 41°13′03″N 101°35′03″W	Keystone	
11	Roscoe State Aid Bridge	Roscoe State Aid Bridge	June 29, 1992 (#92000709)	State Link 51B over the South Platte River, 0.5 miles southeast of Roscoe; 41°07′33″N 101°34′35″W	Roscoe	
12	Standard Oil Red Crown Service Station	Standard Oil Red Crown Service Station	August 20, 2004 (#04000897)	220 N. Spruce St. 41°07′34″N 101°43′09″W	Ogallala	
13	Up/Over	Up/Over	July 7, 2026 (#100012973)	Ogallala Rest Area Westbound, Interstate 80, MM 132.55; 41°07′12″N 101°36′14″W	Ogallala	
14	US Post Office-Ogallala	US Post Office-Ogallala	May 11, 1992 (#92000481)	301 N. Spruce St. 41°07′37″N 101°43′09″W	Ogallala	One of 12 Nebraska post offices featuring a Section of Fine Arts mural, "Longhorns" (1938) by Frank Mechau.

== Former listing ==
	Name on the Register	Image	Date listed	Date removed	Location	City or town	Description
1	Welsch Motor Court-Erin Plaza Motor Court	Welsch Motor Court-Erin Plaza Motor Court	November 16, 2005 (#05001295)	September 4, 2013	311 E. 1st St. 41°07′30″N 101°42′58″W	Ogallala	

== See also ==
- List of National Historic Landmarks in Nebraska
- National Register of Historic Places listings in Nebraska
