= Brule =

Brule, Brulé or Brûlé may refer to:

== Native American ==
- Brulé, or Sicangu, a branch of the Lakota nation
- Brulé (band), a Native American World Beat

== Places ==
=== Canada ===
- Brule, Alberta, hamlet in Alberta
- Brule, Nova Scotia, a community in Nova Scotia

=== United States ===
- Brule, Wisconsin, a town, US
- Brule (community), Wisconsin, an unincorporated community, US
- Brule, Nebraska, US
- Brule River, forming a portion of the boundary between Michigan and Wisconsin
- Brule River (Minnesota)
- Bois Brule River in Wisconsin, also known as the Brule River
- Brule County, South Dakota

== People ==
- André Brulé (1879–1953), a French theatre and film actor
- Aurélien Brulé (b. 1979), French founder of Kalaweit Project
- Étienne Brûlé (c. 1592 – c. 1633), French explorer of North America
- Gace Brulé (c. 1160 – after 1213), French poet-composer
- Gilbert Brulé (born 1987), Canadian ice hockey player
- Jean-Marc Brûlé (born 1965), a French politician
- Jean-Philippe Brulé (born 1981), a field hockey player from Belgium
- Julien Brulé (1875–1920), a French archer
- Georges Brulé (1876–1961), a French modern pentathlete
- Paul Brule (born 1945), a former gridiron football player
- Robin Brûlé (born 1974), a Canadian actress
- Steve Brûlé (born 1975), a Canadian professional ice hockey player
- Steve Brule, a fictional character in television series Check It Out! with Dr. Steve Brule portrayed by John C. Reilly
- Tyler Brûlé (born 1968), Canadian journalist, entrepreneur and magazine publisher

== See also ==
- Bois-Brûlés, a name most frequently associated with the French-speaking Métis of the Red River Colony in the Red River valley
- Brule Formation
- Brule Lake (disambiguation)
- Brûlée River (disambiguation)
- Crème Brûlée (disambiguation)
- Mont Brulé (Arolla), a mountain of the Pennine Alps, located on the Swiss-Italian border
- Mont Brûlé (Val d'Entremont), a mountain of the Swiss Pennine Alps, overlooking Orsières in the canton of Valais
- USS Brule, the name of two ships of the U.S. Navy
