= Joshua Brown (politician) =

American politician (1883–1957)

Member of the Nebraska Legislature from the 39th district
- In office January 2, 1951 – April 12, 1954
- Preceded by: Clyde Cretsinger
- Succeeded by: Clyde Cretsinger

Personal details
- Born: August 9, 1883 Aledo, Illinois
- Died: October 25, 1957 (aged 74) Ogallala, Nebraska
- Party: Republican
- Spouse: Jennie C. Peterson (m. 1910)
- Children: 5
- Occupation: Farmer, cattle feeder

Joshua Logan Brown (August 9, 1883 – October 25, 1957) was a Republican politician from Nebraska who served as a member of the Nebraska Legislature from the 39th district from 1951 to 1954.

== Early life ==
Brown was born in Aledo, Illinois, in 1883, and grew up in Chappell, Nebraska. He graduated from the Fremont Normal School and farmed and raised cattle in Brule. He ran for the Keith County Board of Supervisors in 1926, and won both the Republican primary and general election unopposed. He was repeatedly re-elected to the board, and served until he was elected to the legislature in 1950.

== Nebraska Legislature ==
In 1950, Brown ran for the state legislature, challenging incumbent State Senator Clyde Cretsinger for re-election in the 39th district, which included Arthur, Blaine, Deuel, Garden, Grant, Hooker, Keith, Logan, McPherson, and Thomas counties. In the primary election, Cretsinger placed first by a wide margin, winning 52 percent of the vote to Brown's 35 percent. They advanced to the general election, where Brown narrowly won, defeating Cretsinger, 52–48 percent.

Brown ran for re-election in 1952, and was challenged by rancher Robert Geisert. In the primary election, Brown placed first, winning 60 percent of the vote to Geisert's 40 percent. Brown ultimately defeated Geisert by a wide margin, receiving 59 percent of the vote to Geisert's 41 percent.

On April 12, 1954, Brown resigned from office, citing ill health. Former State Senator Clyde Cretsinger was appointed to succeed him.

== Death ==
Brown died on October 25, 1957.
