= Brule Glacial Spillway State Natural Area =

State Natural Area in Douglas County, Wisconsin

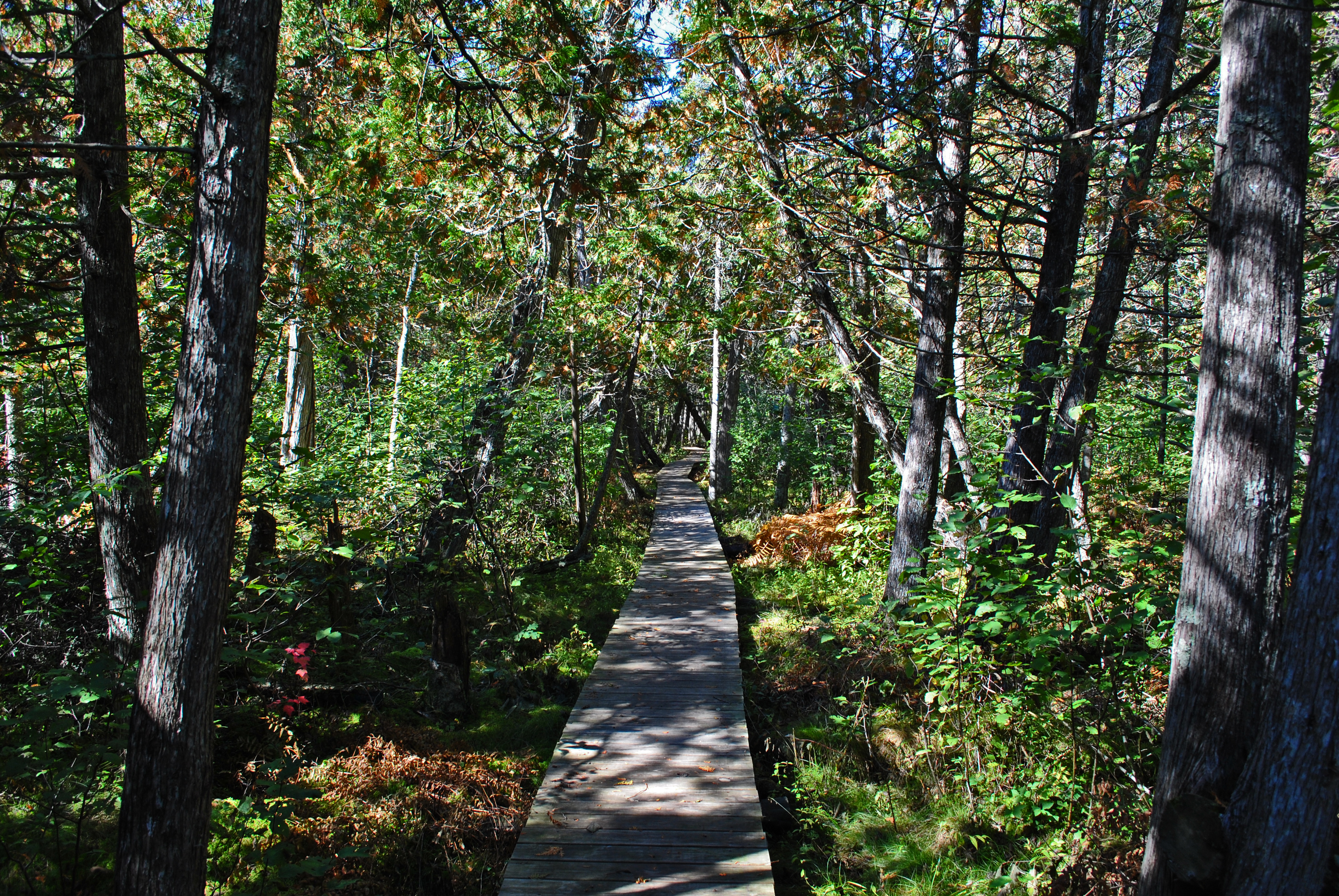

- Location within Wisconsin Location within the United States
- Location: Douglas County, Wisconsin
- Coordinates: 46°24′31″N 91°43′31″W
- Area: 2,656 acres (1,075 ha)
- Established: 2003
- Owner: Wisconsin Department of Natural Resources
- Website: Official website
- Wisconsin State Natural Areas

Brule Glacial Spillway is a Wisconsin Department of Natural Resources-designated State Natural Area that encompasses the valley of the upper reaches of the Bois Brule River. This valley was carved by the outlet of Glacial Lake Duluth, which occupied what is now the western portion of Lake Superior, during the retreat of the Superior lobe of Wisconsin glaciation. This outlet flowed southwestward through the valley, to what is now the St. Croix River. As the glacier melted, and the level of Lake Superior dropped, the direction of flow shifted to its present northeastward course, towards Lake Superior. A high point in a vast bog near Solon Springs marks the Saint Lawrence River Divide between the watersheds of the Gulf of Mexico and the Atlantic Ocean. This divide was used for thousands of years, by Native Americans, European explorers, fur traders, and settlers as a portage between the two watersheds.

The upper Bois Brule valley possesses many unique ecological attributes and remains in nearly pre-settlement condition. The river here passes through extensive areas of coniferous swamps and bogs, alder thickets, and sedge meadows. These are fed by numerous groundwater seeps and springs, which contain clean, cold water, and keep the slopes of the valley perpetually moist, which discouraged post-settlement logging activities. This has led to an exceptionally rich flora, including numerous rare species, such as fairy slipper, northern black currant, small yellow lady slipper, marsh willowherb, and the state-endangered Lapland buttercup. Bird life is also diverse, and includes the following species: boreal chickadee, black-backed woodpecker, Canada jay, northern saw-whet owl, Cape May warbler, and northern goshawk. Rare insects found here include the Jutta Arctic, ski-tailed emerald (Somatochlora elongata), and zebra clubtail (Stylurus scudderi).

== Location and access ==
Brule Glacial Spillway is located in east-central Douglas County, within the Brule River State Forest, approximately 4 miles (6.4 km) northeast of Solon Springs. The natural area consists of three separate parcels along an 8-mile (13 km) stretch of the upper Bois Brule River. The site can be accessed via canoe, with a canoe landing located at Stone's Bridge, on County Highway S. The North Country National Scenic Trail also passes through a portion of the site, a section of which is boardwalk through a vast cedar swamp. A third point of access is at the end of Stone Chimney Road, east of County Highway P.

== Gallery ==
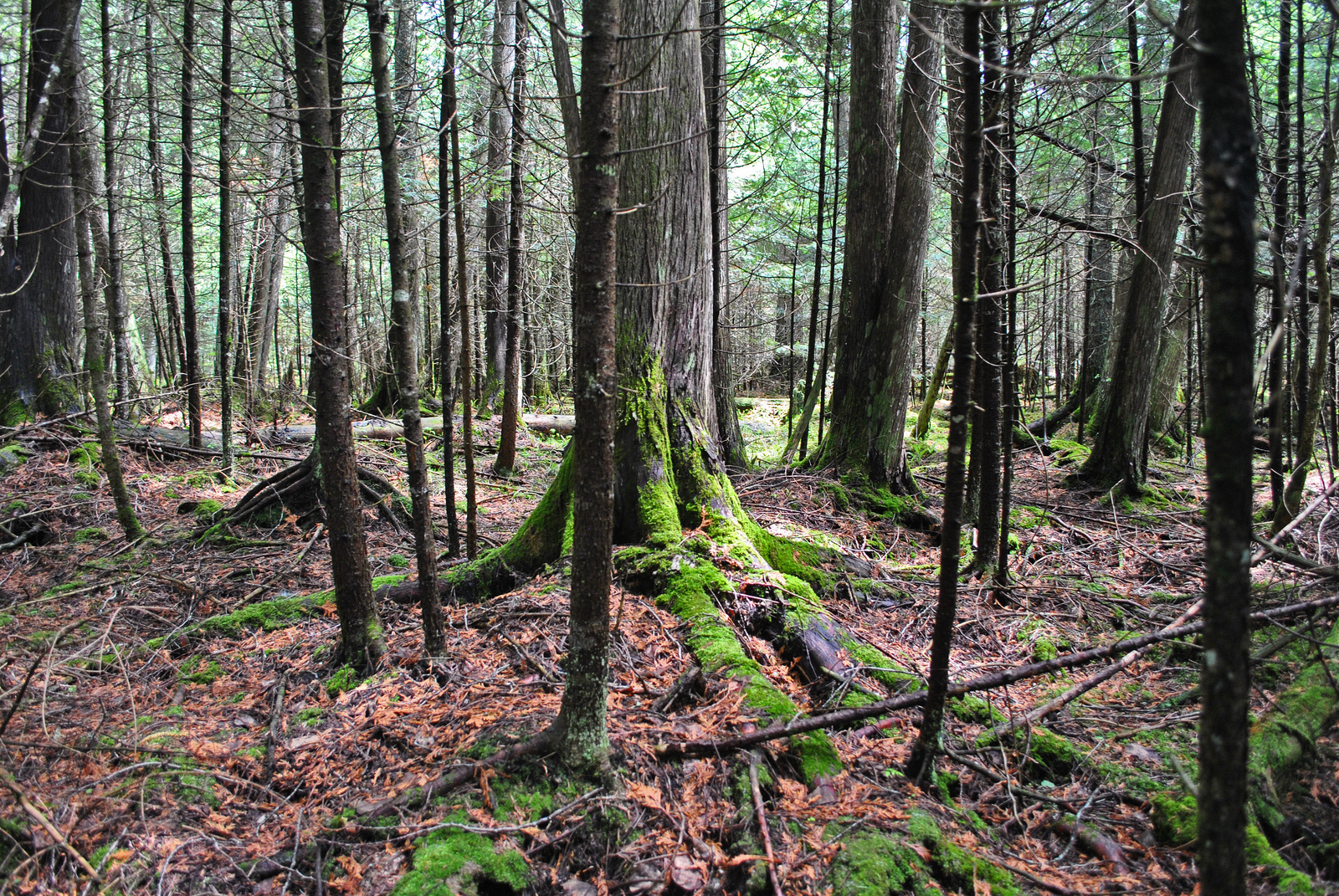
Cedar swamp, south of Stone Chimney Road

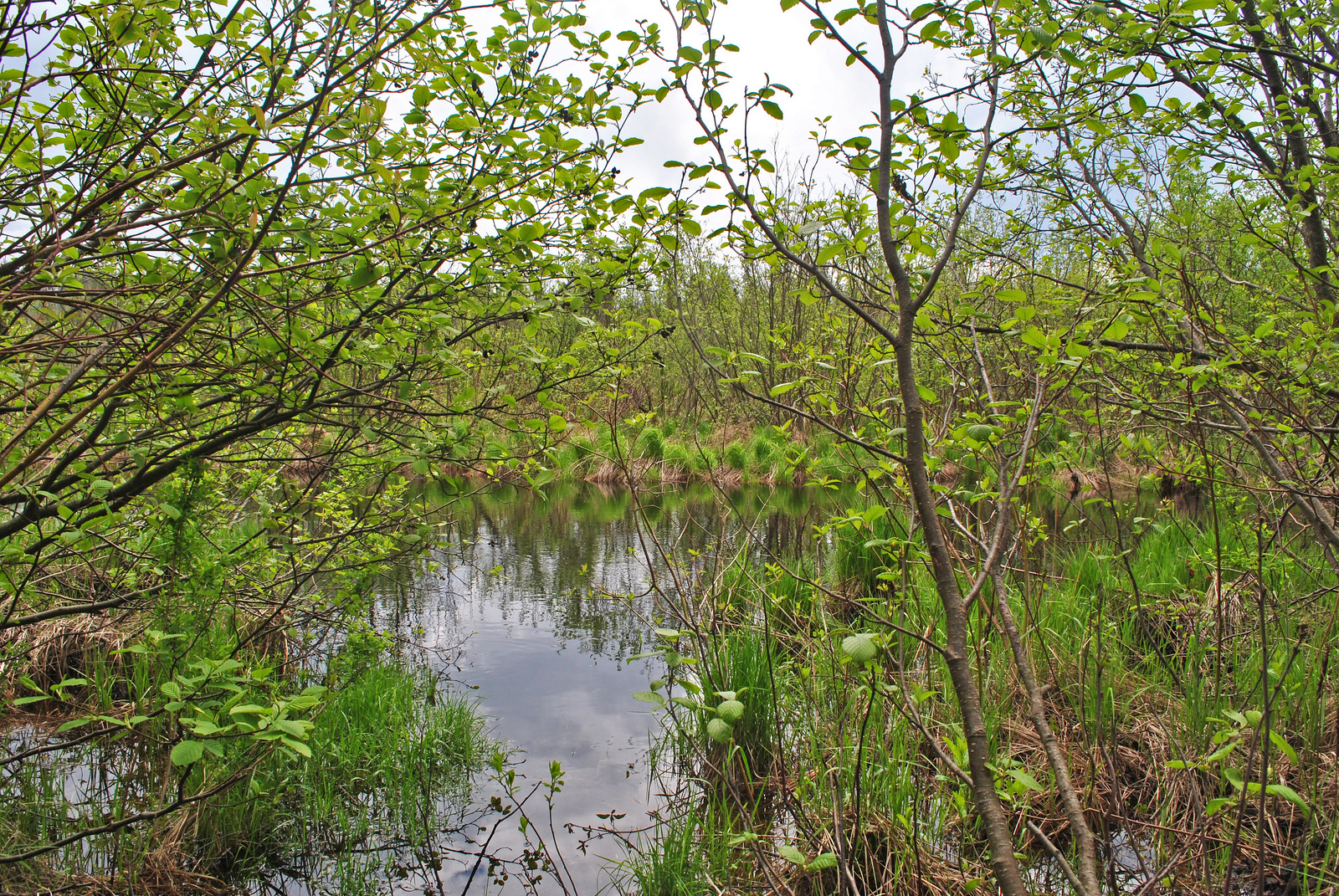
Alder-lined upper reach of the Bois Brule River

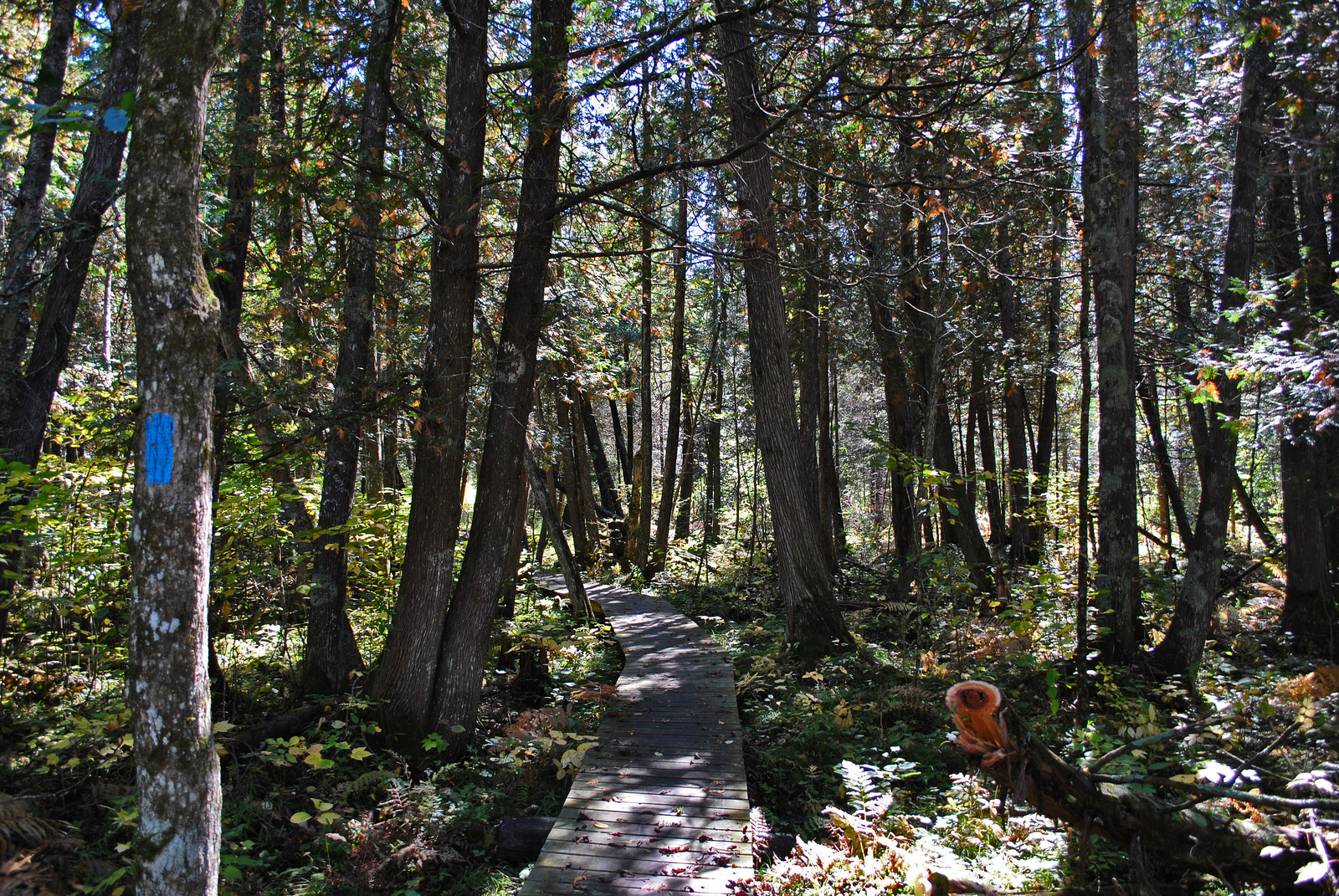
The "Brule Bog Boardwalk", a section of the North Country National Scenic Trail

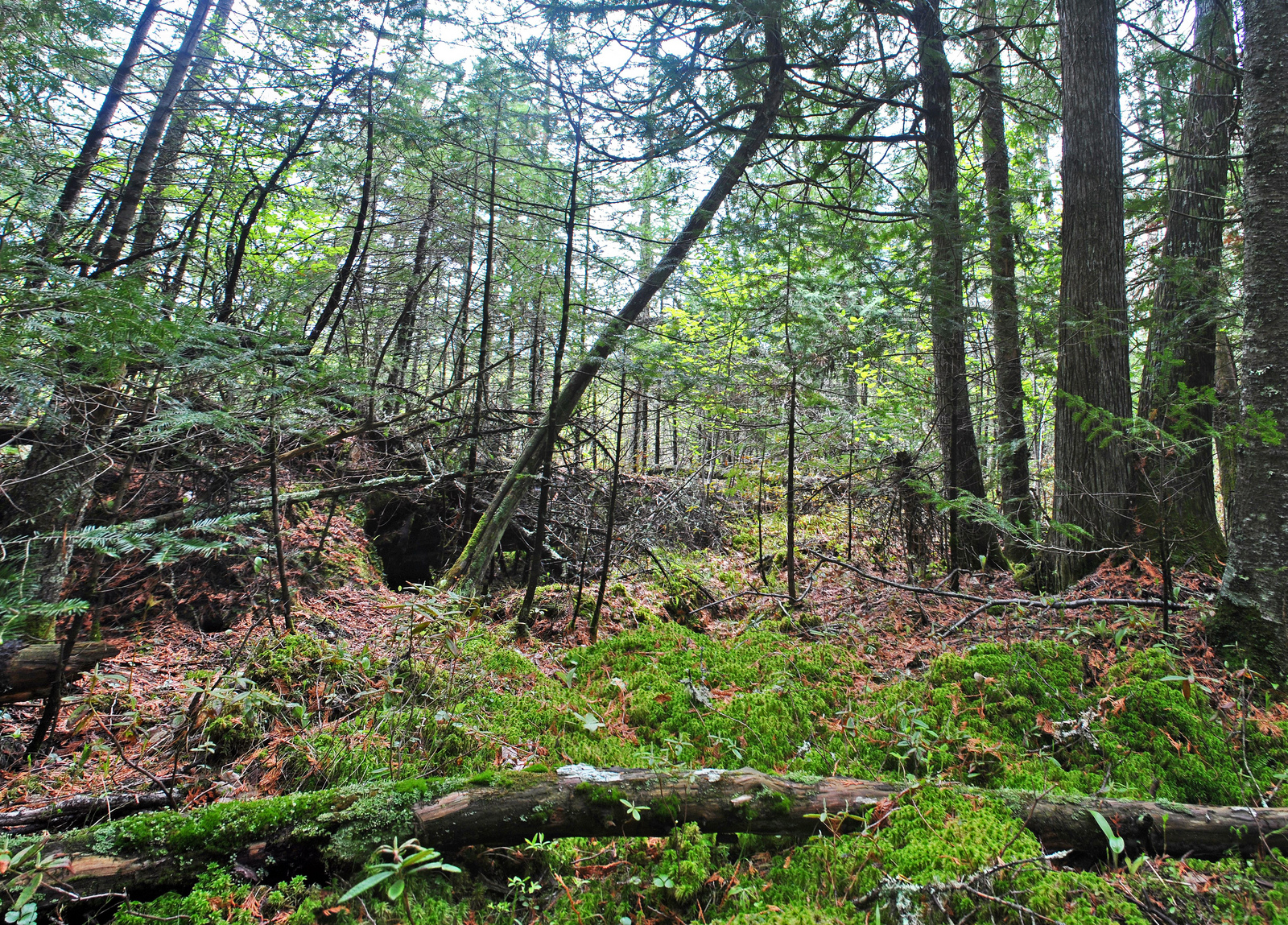
The Brule Glacial Spillway appears much as it did in pre-settlement times
