= Mont Brule =

Mont Brule can refer to:

- Mont Brulé (Arolla)
- Mont Brûlé (Val d'Entremont)
