= KMCX-FM =

- Ogallala, Nebraska; United States
- Broadcast area: North Platte, Nebraska
- Frequency: 106.5 MHz
- Branding: Hot Country 106.5

Programming
- Format: Country music
- Affiliations: Premiere Networks

Ownership
- Owner: iHeartMedia, Inc.; (iHM Licenses, LLC)
- Sister stations: KOGA (AM), KOGA-FM

History
- First air date: 1980
- Former call signs: KMCX (1980–1982)

Technical information
- Licensing authority: FCC
- Facility ID: 42075
- Class: C1
- ERP: 100,000 watts
- HAAT: 96.0 meters (315.0 ft)
- Transmitter coordinates: 41°8′2″N 101°41′42″W

Links
- Public license information: Public file; LMS
- Webcast: Listen Live
- Website: kmcx.com

KMCX-FM (106.5 MHz) is a radio station broadcasting a country music format. Licensed to Ogallala, Nebraska, United States, the station serves the North Platte area and is owned by iHeartMedia.

== History ==
The station was assigned the call letters KMCX on May 22, 1980. On March 30, 1982, the station changed its call sign to the current KMCX-FM. On December 23, 2004, the station was sold to Capstar TX Limited Partnership, a subsidiary of Clear Channel Communications (now iHeartMedia).
