= Carl Jeffords =

American politician (1888–1972)

Member of the Nebraska Legislature from the 39th district
- In office January 5, 1943 – January 7, 1947
- Preceded by: Rufus Howard
- Succeeded by: Clyde Cretsinger

Personal details
- Born: November 12, 1888 Broken Bow, Nebraska
- Died: November 23, 1972 (aged 84) Mullen, Nebraska
- Party: Republican
- Spouse: Myrtle Gard (m. 1918)
- Children: 2
- Education: University of Nebraska
- Occupation: Teacher, stockman, farmer

Carl Price Jeffords (November 12, 1888 – November 23, 1972) was a Republican politician from Nebraska who served as a member of the Nebraska Legislature from the 39th district from 1943 to 1947.

== Early life ==
Jeffords was born in Broken Bow, Nebraska, in 1888. He attended the University of Nebraska, and was a public school teacher. Jeffords served on the local school board and as a justice of the peace.

== Nebraska Legislature ==
In 1942, State Senator Rufus Howard opted to run for Lieutenant Governor rather than seek re-election. Jeffords ran to succeed him in the 39th district, which was based in western Nebraska and included Arthur, Blaine, Deuel, Garden, Grant, Hooker, Keith, Logan, McPherson, and Thomas counties. In the nonpartisan primary, he faced former Ogallala Mayor C. H. Fisher, state irrigation office employee Guy Roberts, and farmer Cecil Stanley. Jeffords narrowly placed first in the primary, winning 28 percent of the vote to Roberts's 25 percent, and they advanced to the general election. Jeffords narrowly defeated Roberts in the general election, winning 53–47 percent.

Jeffords ran for re-election in 1944, and was challenged by businessman Russell Anderson and rancher Sy Brogan. Jeffords placed first in the primary, receiving 40 percent of the vote to Anderson's 34 percent and Brogan's 26 percent. Jeffords and Anderson advanced to the general election, where Jeffords won, 56–44 percent.

In 1946, Jeffords ran for a third term, and was challenged by farmer Clyde Cretsinger. Jeffords placed first over Cretsinger in the primary election by a wide margin, winning 60 percent of the vote to Cretsinger's 40 percent, but ultimately lost the general election, receiving 41 percent of the vote to Cretsinger's 59 percent.

Cretsinger ran for a second term in 1948, and Jeffords challenged him. Jeffords placed second in the primary, receiving 39 percent of the vote to Cretsinger's 61 percent, and lost the general election by a slightly smaller margin than his 1946 defeat, winning 42 percent to Cretsinger's 58 percent.

== Post-legislative career ==
In 1950, Jeffords was elected as a delegate to the Nebraska Republican Party convention.

== Death ==
Jeffords died on November 23, 1972.
