= Brûlée River =

Brûlée River or Brulée River may refer to:

- Brûlée River (Champlain River), a tributary of the Champlain River, in Saint-Maurice, Quebec, Canada
- Brûlée River (Portneuf River), a tributary of the Portneuf River, in Côte-Nord and Saguenay-Lac-Saint-Jean, Quebec, Canada
- Brûlée River (Sautauriski River tributary), a tributary of the Sautauriski River, in Capitale-Nationale, Quebec, Canada
- Brûlé River (Sainte-Anne River tributary), in Capitale-Nationale, Quebec, Canada

== See also ==
- Brule River, forming a portion of the boundary between Michigan and Wisconsin in the United States
- Brule River (Minnesota)
- Bois Brule River in Wisconsin, also known as the Brule River
