= United States Post Office (Ogallala, Nebraska) =

- U.S. Post Office - Ogallala
- U.S. National Register of Historic Places
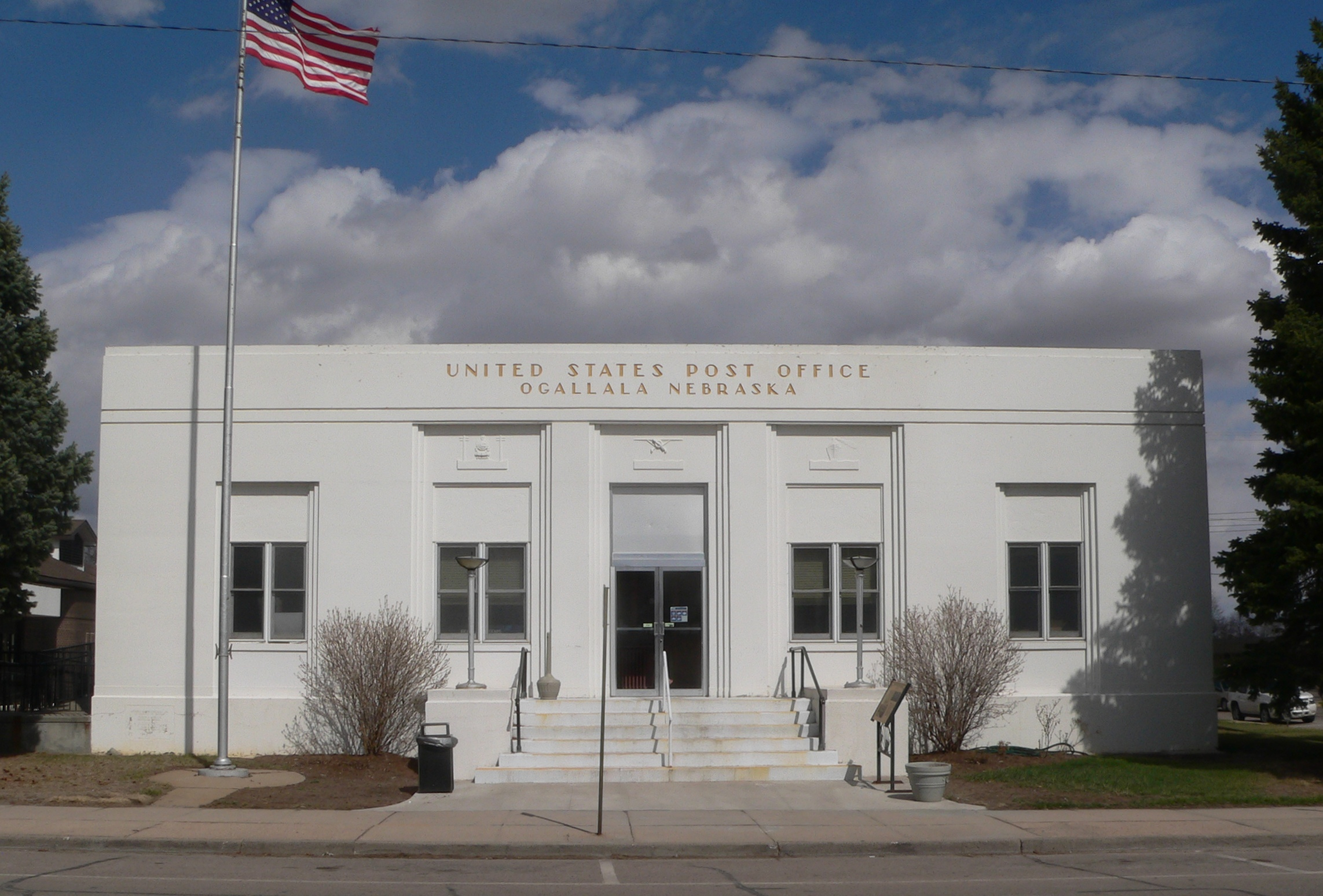
- The post office in 2013

- Location within Nebraska Location within the United States
- Location: 301 North Spruce Street, Ogallala, Nebraska
- Coordinates: 41°07′37″N 101°43′07″W
- Area: less than one acre
- Built: 1938
- Built by: Beckenhauer Bros.
- Architect: Louis Simon
- Architectural style: Moderne
- MPS: Nebraska Post Offices Which Contain Section Artwork MPS
- NRHP reference No.: 92000481
- Added to NRHP: May 11, 1992

The United States Post Office-Ogallala is a historic one-story building in Ogallala, Nebraska. It was built as a post office in 1937-1938 by Beckenhauer Bros., and designed in the Moderne style by Louis Simon. Inside, there is a mural of a cowboy and longhorns painted by Frank Mechau. The building has been listed on the National Register of Historic Places since May 11, 1992.
