= Clyde Cretsinger =

American politician (1895–1965)

Member of the Nebraska Legislature from the 39th district
- In office April 13, 1954 – January 4, 1955
- Preceded by: Joshua Brown
- Succeeded by: Donald McGinley
- In office January 7, 1947 – January 2, 1951
- Preceded by: Carl Jeffords
- Succeeded by: Joshua Brown

Personal details
- Born: October 21, 1895 Coon Rapids, Iowa
- Died: January 12, 1965 (aged 69) Tucson, Arizona
- Party: Republican
- Spouse: Flora Morse (m. 1923)
- Education: Capital City Commercial College
- Occupation: Farmer

Clyde Franklin Cretsinger (October 21, 1895 – January 12, 1965) was a Republican politician from Nebraska who served as a member of the Nebraska Legislature from the 39th district from 1947 to 1951 and again from 1954 to 1955.

== Early life ==
Cretsinger was born in Coon Rapids, Iowa, and graduated from Coon Rapids High School, and later attended the Capital City Commercial College in Des Moines. He mserved in the U.S. Air Service during World War I, and moved to Nebraska in 1919, settling in Keith County, where he maintained a farm and raised livestock.

== Nebraska Legislature ==
In 1946, Cretsinger ran for the state legislature from the 39th district, which included Arthur, Blaine, Deuel, Garden, Grant, Hooker, Keith, Logan, McPherson, and Thomas counties in western Nebraska. He ran against incumbent State Senator Carl Jeffords, who was seeking his third term. In the primary election, Cretsinger placed second, receiving 40 percent of the vote to Jeffords's 60 percent, They advanced to the general election, where Cretsinger defeated Jeffords by a wide margin, winning 59–41 percent.

Cretsinger ran for re-election in 1948, and was challenged by Jeffords in a rematch of their 1946 campaign. Cretsinger placed first in the primary by a wide margin, winning 61 percent of the vote to Jeffords's 39 percent, and ultimately defeated Jeffords in the general election with 58 percent of the vote.

In 1950, Cretsinger ran for a third term, and was challenged by Keith County Supervisor Joshua Brown and rancher D. E. Bauer. Cretsinger placed first in the primary election, receiving 52 percent of the vote to Brown's 35 percent and Bauder's 12 percent, and advanced to the general election with Brown. Cretsinger narrowly lost to Brown, receiving 48 percent of the vote to his 52 percent.

Brown was re-elected to the legislature in 1952, and in 1954, resigned, citing ill health. Governor Robert B. Crosby appointed Cretsinger to serve out the remainder of Brown's term, and he was sworn in on April 13, 1954. Cretsinger declined to run for a full term in the election. He was elected as an alternate delegate to the Nebraska Republican Party convention in 1954 from Keith County.

== Post-legislative career ==
On February 16, 1955, Cretsinger was appointed by Governor Victor Anderson to the newly created Nebraska Board of Educational Lands and Funds. He served a several-month term until the board was permanently established, and was appointed to a four-year term on August 5, 1955. At the expiration of Cretsinger's term in 1959, Governor Ralph G. Brooks appointed H. L. Blackledge as his successor.

== Death ==
Cretsinger died on January 12, 1965, in Tucson, Arizona, while he was on vacation after attending the Cotton Bowl.
