= Leonidas A. Brandhoefer Mansion =

- U.S. National Register of Historic Places
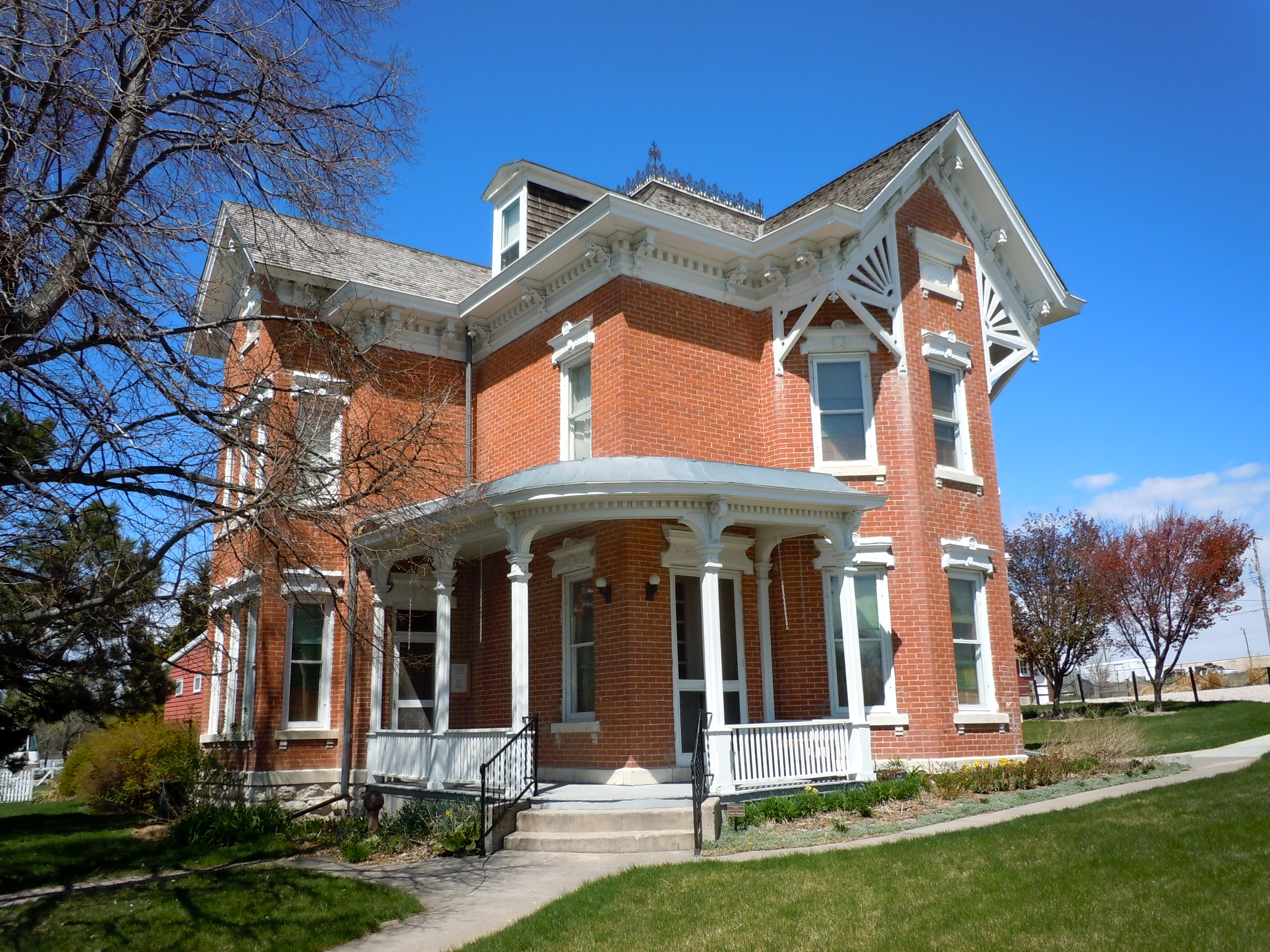
- The house in 2011

- Location within Nebraska Location within the United States
- Location: 10th and Spruce Streets, Ogallala, Nebraska
- Coordinates: 41°08′01″N 101°43′14″W
- Area: 0.3 acres (0.12 ha)
- Built: 1887
- Architectural style: Victorian
- NRHP reference No.: 73001065
- Added to NRHP: October 3, 1973

The Leonidas A. Brandhoefer Mansion is a historic three-story house in Ogallala, Nebraska. It was built in 1887 with red bricks kilned in Ogallala for Leonidas A. Brandhoefer, a banker and cattle-breeder, and it was designed in the Victorian architectural style. Brandhoefer had built the house for his fiancée; however, by the time he met her again in Chicago, she had married another man. As a result, the house became known as the Heart Break House. Brandhoefer sold the house after his business ventures failed, and he returned to Chicago. The house was acquired and restored by the Keith County Historical Society in 1966. It has been listed on the National Register of Historic Places since October 3, 1973.
