= Diamond Springs Stage Station Site =

- U.S. National Register of Historic Places
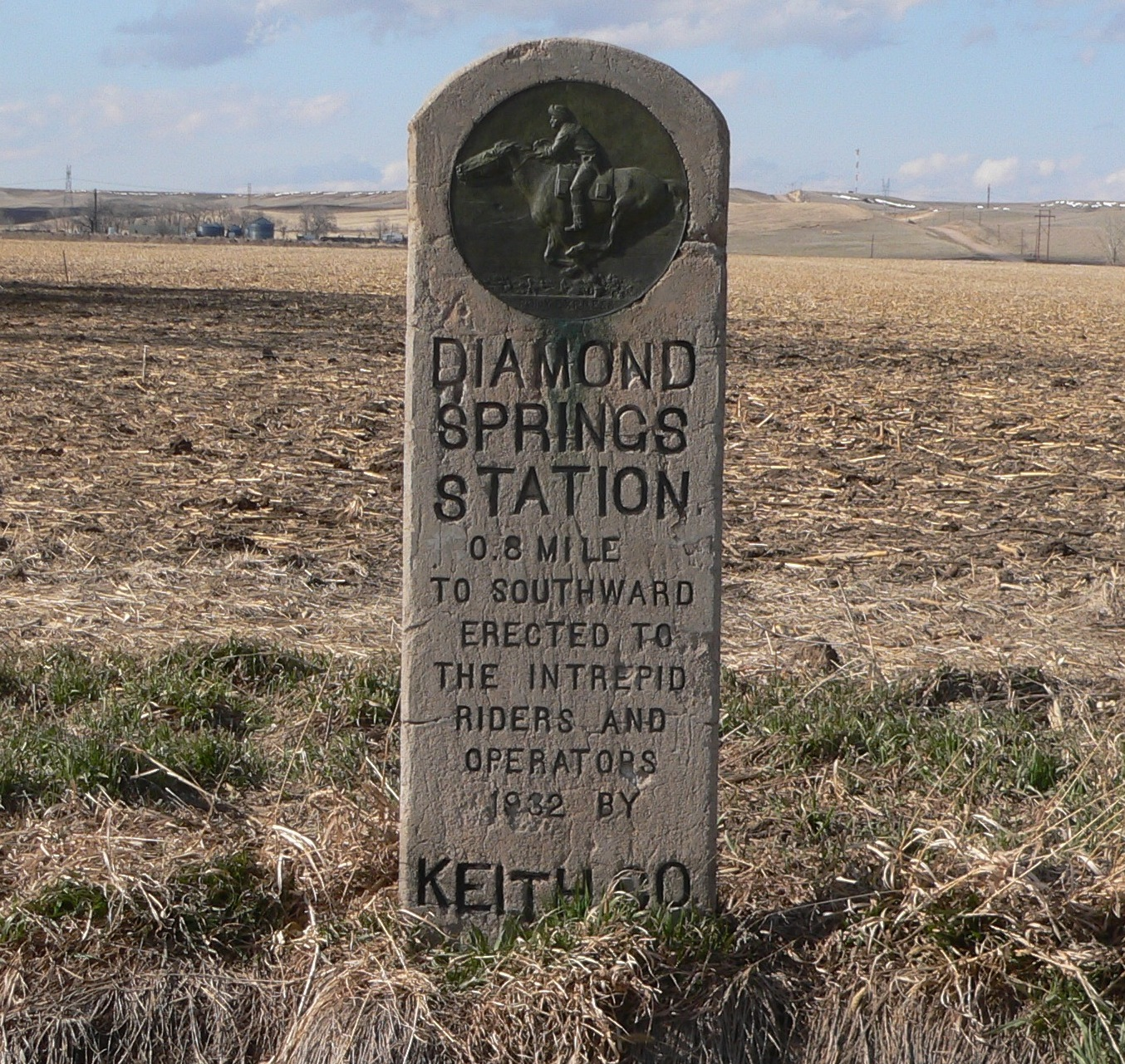

- Location within Nebraska Location within the United States
- Nearest city: Brule, Nebraska
- Coordinates: 41°04′47″N 101°54′19″W
- Area: 4 acres (1.6 ha)
- Built: 1859
- NRHP reference No.: 70000371
- Added to NRHP: October 15, 1970

The Diamond Springs Stage Station Site, in Keith County, Nebraska near Brule, Nebraska was the site of a stagecoach station in 1859. It was listed on the National Register of Historic Places in 1970.

It is a 4 acres (1.6 ha) site located just 70 to 100 feet north of the right-of-way of Interstate 80, about 1 mile (1.6 km) west of the Brule exit of the interstate. The Platte River is about .25 miles (0.40 km) to its north. It is at elevation about five feet above the river level.

It was deemed "of importance archeologically because of the relatively undisturbed remains present here of a station used by both the Pony Express and the Overland Stage in the mid 1800s. This station was apparently built in 1859 by Russell, Majors and Waddell after that firm bought out Jones and Russell's Leavenworth and Pike's Peak Express Company."

No above-ground structures remain, but the site has never been ploughed and the ground shows evidence of building areas.
