= Ruthton (disambiguation) =

Ruthton may refer to:

- Ruthton, Kentucky, an unincorporated community located in Madison County
- Ruthton, Minnesota, a city in Pipestone County
- Ruthton, Nebraska, an unincorporated community in Keith County
- Ruthton Corp, a company co-founded by Ruth Handler
