= Col Collon =

Mountain pass across the central Pennine Alps

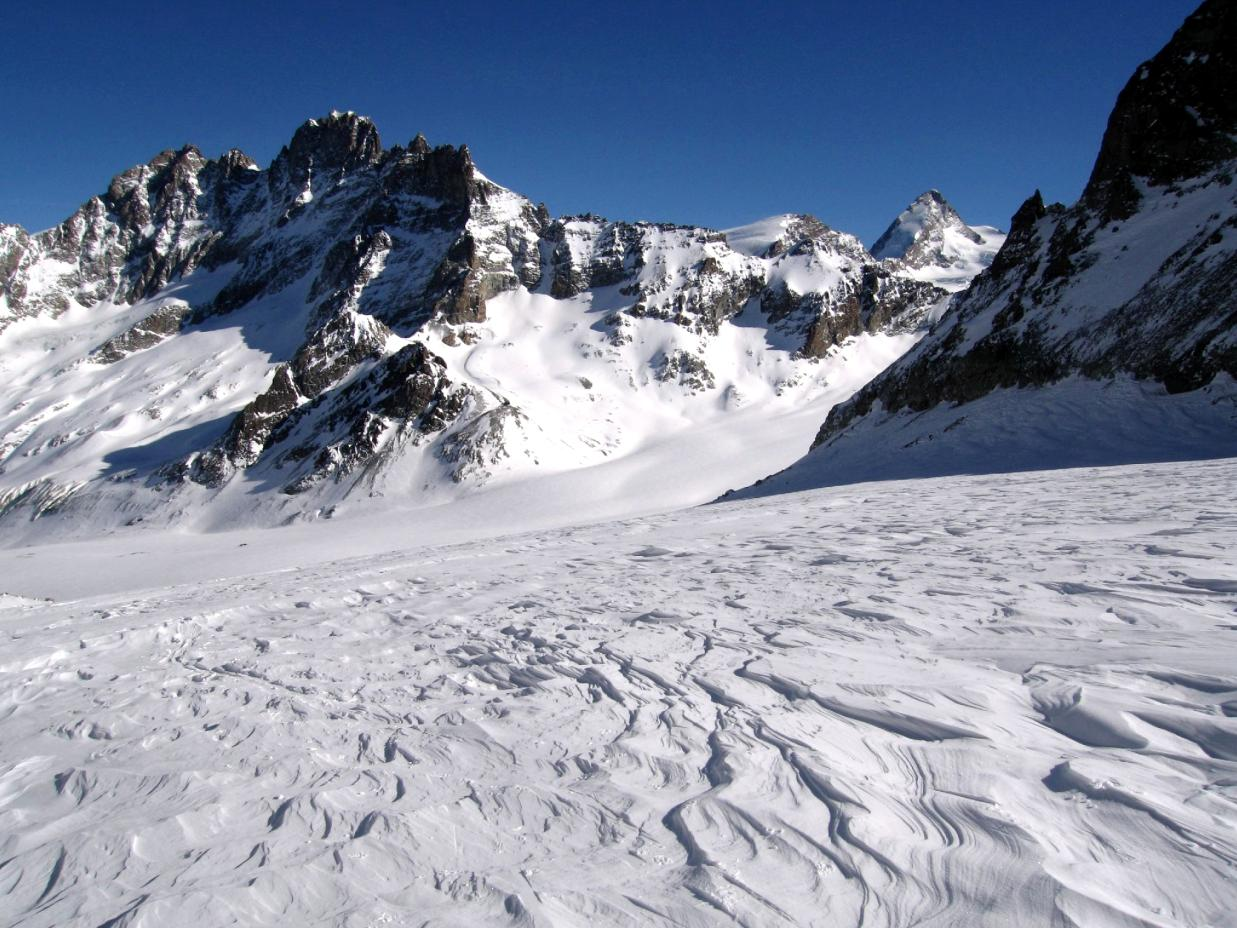
- View from the top

- Location within Alps
- Elevation: 3,074 metres (10,085 ft)
- Traversed by: Glacier

Third Approach
- Location: Switzerland - Italy
- Range: Pennine Alps
- Coordinates: 45°57′38″N 7°30′51″E

Col Collon (el. 3074 m.) is a high mountain pass across the central Pennine Alps, connecting Arolla in the Swiss canton of Valais to Bionaz in the Italian region of Aosta Valley.

The pass is located on the border at the southern tip of the Arolla Glacier, south of Mont Collon.

== See also ==
- List of mountain passes
