= Nevens, Nebraska =

Unincorporated community in Nebraska, U.S.

Coordinates: 41°11′06″N 101°25′28″W

Nevens is an unincorporated community in Keith County, Nebraska, United States.

== History ==
Nevens got its start following construction of the Union Pacific Railroad through the territory.
