= Keystone Community Church =

- U.S. National Register of Historic Places
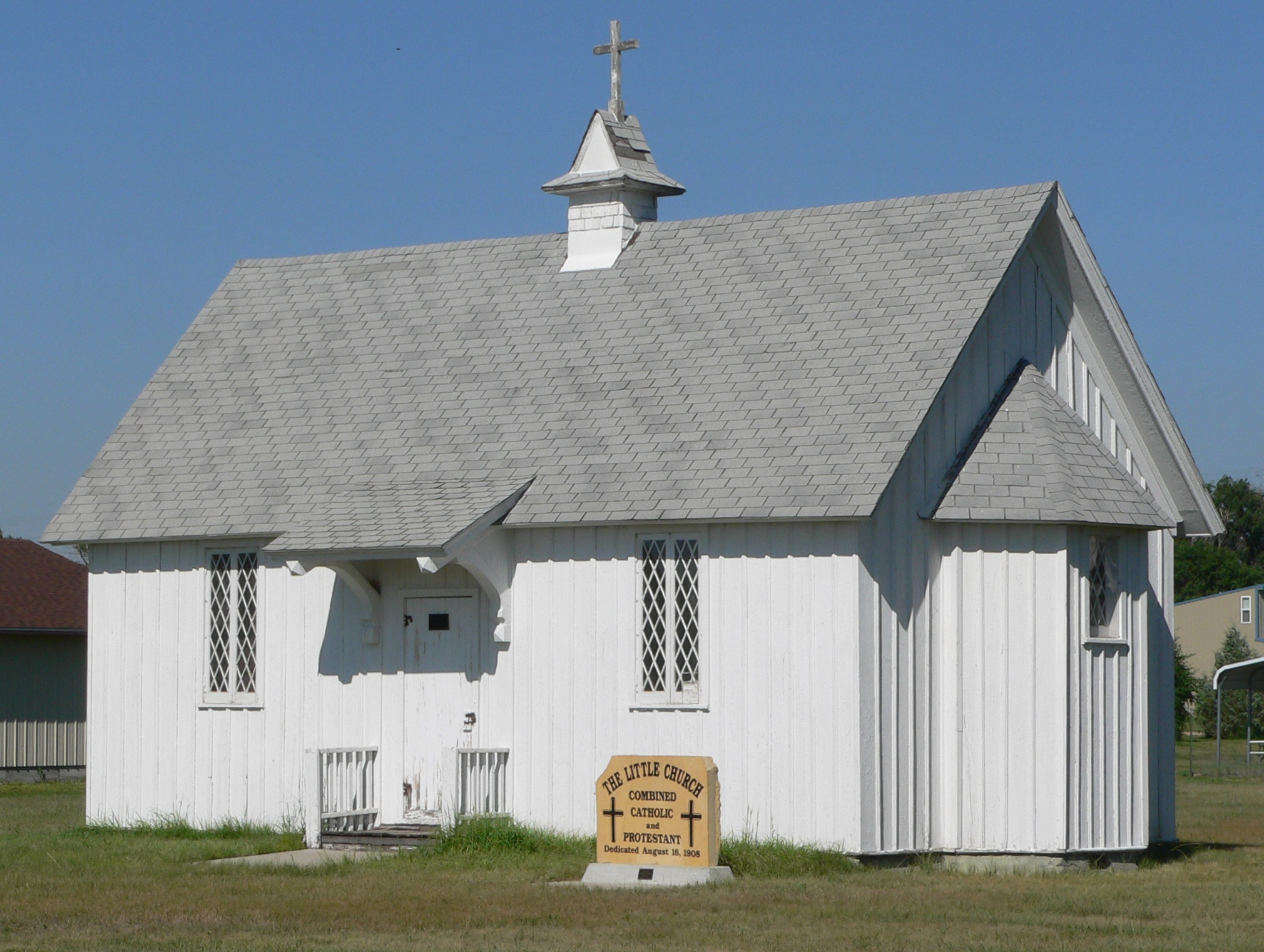

- Location within Nebraska Location within the United States
- Location: McGinley St., Keystone, Nebraska
- Coordinates: 41°13′03″N 101°35′03″W
- Area: less than one acre
- Built: 1908
- Built by: Casey, Ed
- NRHP reference No.: 79001447
- Added to NRHP: January 1, 1979

The Keystone Community Church, on McGinley St. in Keystone, Nebraska, was built in 1908. It was listed on the National Register of Historic Places in 1979.

It is a one-story board and batten building just 9.8 by 3.9 metres (32 ft × 13 ft) in plan. It has also been known as The Little Church.
