= Mont Brulé (Arolla) =

Mountain in Switzerland

- Mont Braoulé
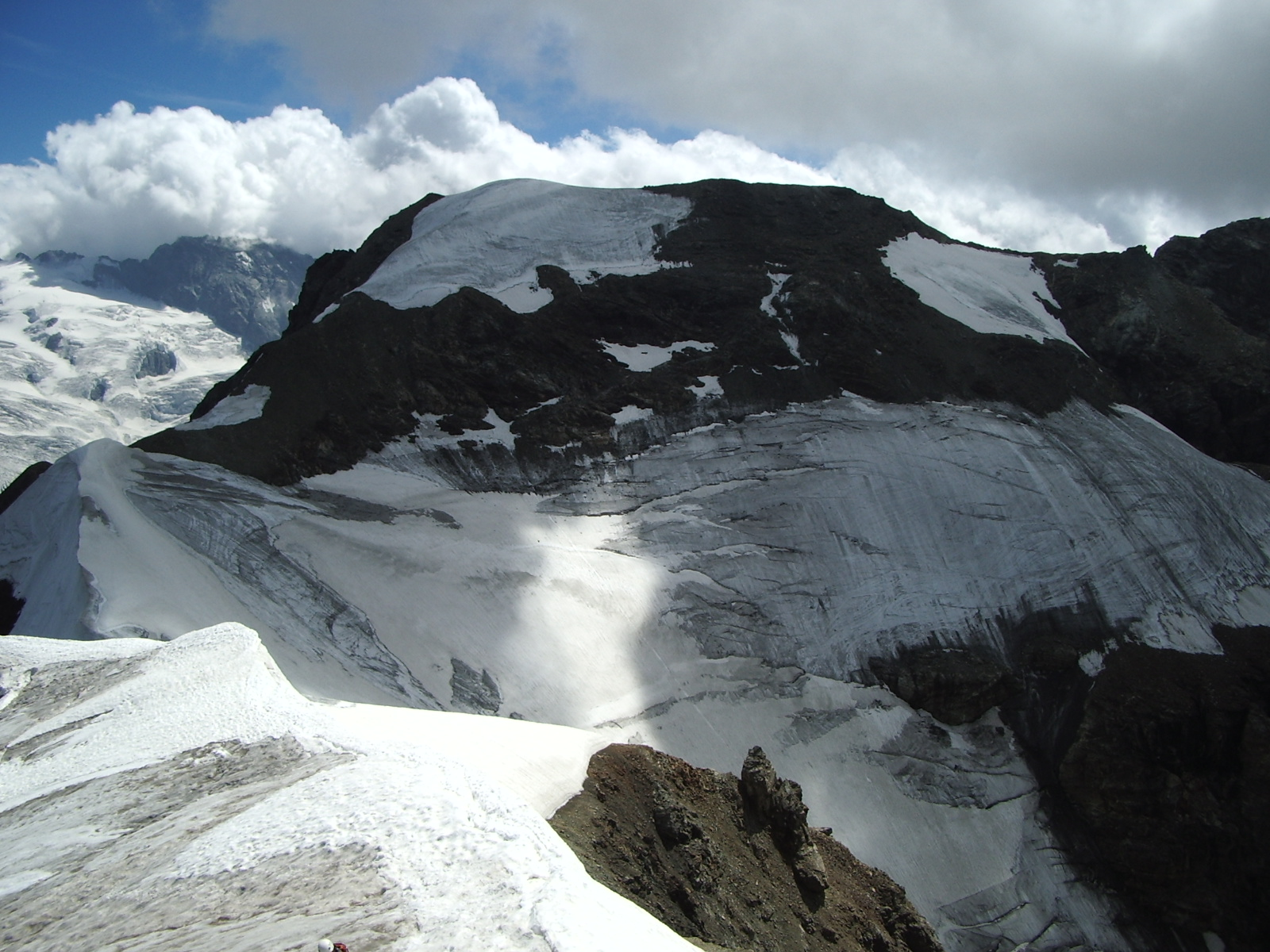
- The west side

Highest point
- Elevation: 3,578 m (11,739 ft)
- Prominence: 365 m (1,198 ft)
- Listing: Alpine mountains above 3000 m
- Coordinates: 45°57′18.8″N 7°32′18.1″E

Geography
- Location within Alps
- Location of the Dom Location in the Alps
- Location: Valais, Switzerland/Aosta Valley, Italy
- Parent range: Pennine Alps

Climbing
- First ascent: 7 August 1876 by Arthur Cust and guide.

Mont Brulé (also known as Mont Brûlé or Mont Braoulé) is a mountain of the Pennine Alps, located on the Swiss-Italian border, east of the Col Collon. On its northern side it overlooks the upper Arolla Glacier.

== Toponym ==
Though in French this name means "burnt mountain", this toponym comes from Valdôtain Francoprovençal patois. According to Aostan botanist and scientist Joseph-Marie Henry, the word Broillà means "made of breuils", Breuil meaning alpine marshy berm, as for Breuil in Valtournenche.
