= Welsch Motor Court-Erin Plaza Motor Court =

- Welsch Motor Court--Erin Plaza Motor Court
- Formerly listed on the U.S. National Register of Historic Places
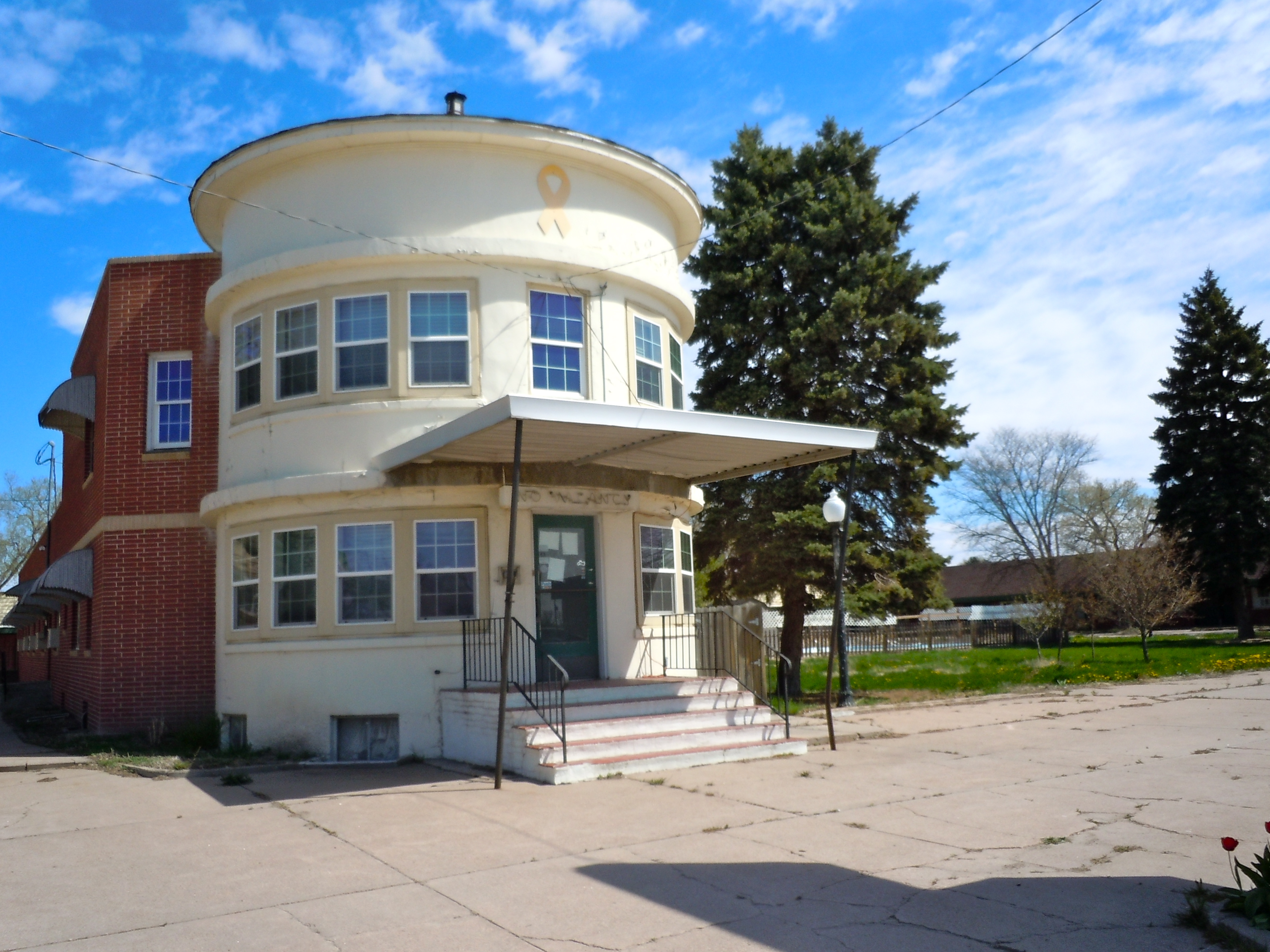

- Location within Nebraska Location within the United States
- Location: 311 E. 1st St., Ogallala, Nebraska
- Coordinates: 41°7′30″N 101°42′58″W
- Area: less than one acre
- NRHP reference No.: 05001295

Significant dates
- Added to NRHP: November 16, 2005
- Removed from NRHP: September 4, 2013

The Welsch Motor Court-Erin Plaza Motor Court was a historic complex of buildings at 311 E. 1st St. in Ogallala, Nebraska. It was also known as Plaza Inn and was denoted KH04-106 by the Nebraska State Historical Society. It was demolished sometime in 2012–13, and removed from the National Register.

It was listed on the National Register of Historic Places in 2005; the listing included four contributing buildings and one other contributing structure.
