= KOGA-FM =

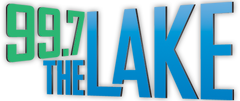
- Ogallala, Nebraska; United States
- Broadcast area: North Platte, Nebraska
- Frequency: 99.7 MHz
- Branding: 99.7 The Lake

Programming
- Format: Classic hits
- Affiliations: Premiere Networks

Ownership
- Owner: iHeartMedia, Inc.; (iHM Licenses, LLC)
- Sister stations: KMCX-FM, KOGA (AM)

Technical information
- Licensing authority: FCC
- Facility ID: 50066
- Class: C1
- ERP: 100,000 watts
- HAAT: 245 meters (804 ft)
- Transmitter coordinates: 41°3′50.00″N 101°20′16.00″W

Links
- Public license information: Public file; LMS
- Webcast: Listen Live
- Website: 997thelake.com

KOGA-FM (99.7 MHz) is a radio station broadcasting a classic hits format. Licensed to Ogallala, Nebraska, United States, the station serves the North Platte area. The station is owned by iHeartMedia. The station's nickname, "The Lake," is in reference to Lake McConaughy, located north of Ogallala.
