= Dr. Burdette and Myrna Gainsforth House =

Historic house in Nebraska, United States

- U.S. National Register of Historic Places
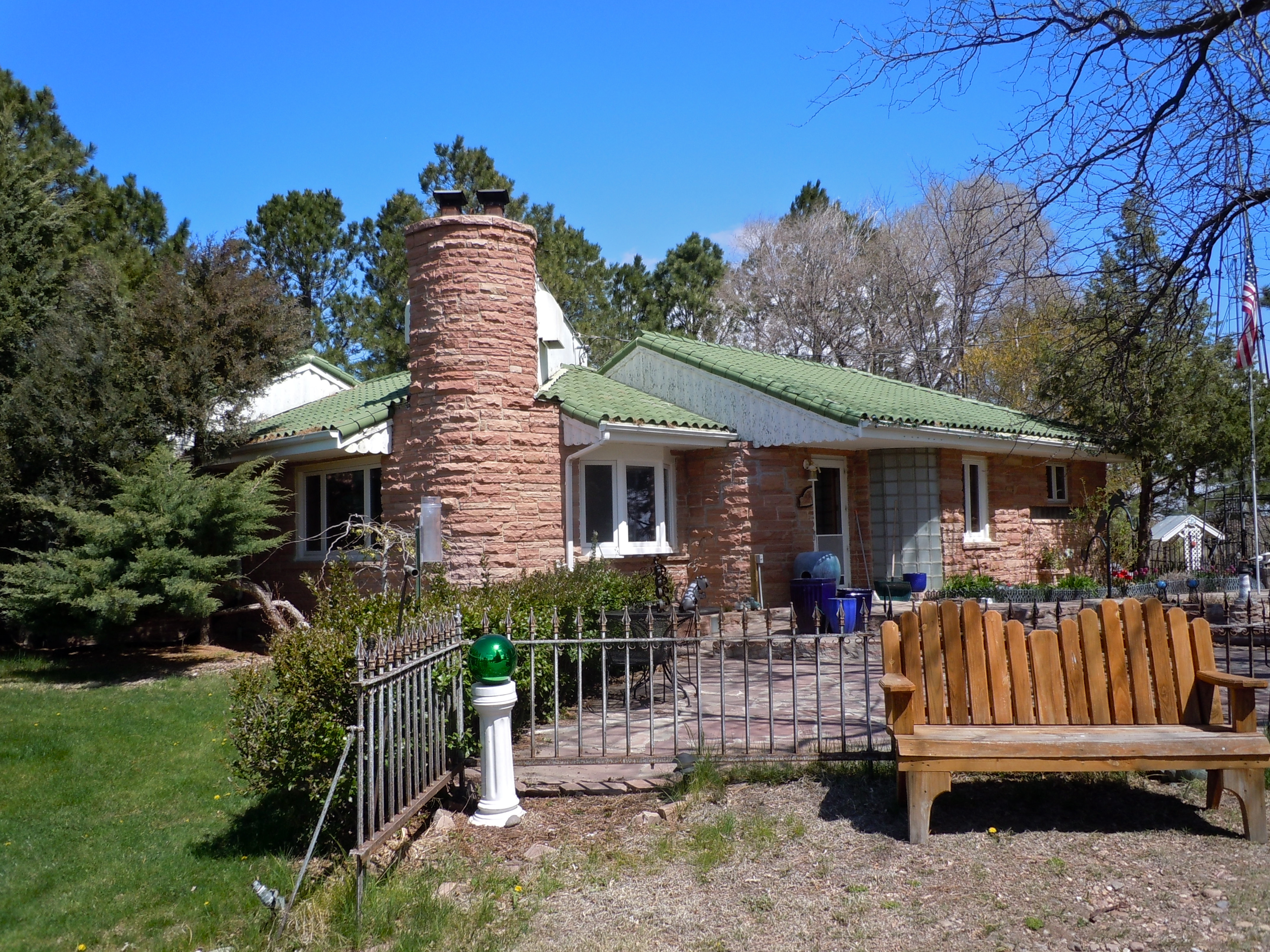

- Location within Nebraska Location within the United States
- Location: 1300 East A St., Ogallala, Nebraska
- Coordinates: 41°8′13″N 101°43′9″W
- Area: 2 acres (0.81 ha)
- Built: 1949
- Architect: Gainsforth, Dr. Burdette L.; et al.
- NRHP reference No.: 02001476
- Added to NRHP: December 5, 2002

The Dr. Burdette and Myrna Gainsforth House, at 1300 East A St. in Ogallala, Nebraska, is a ranch style house that was built in 1949. Also denoted as NeHBS no. KH00-096, it was listed on the National Register of Historic Places in 2002; the listing included two contributing buildings and two contributing structures.

Designed by Dr. Burdette Gainsforth, the house was deemed significant as "a typical, and yet unique, example of an early 1950s ranch style residence."
