= California Hill =

- U.S. National Register of Historic Places
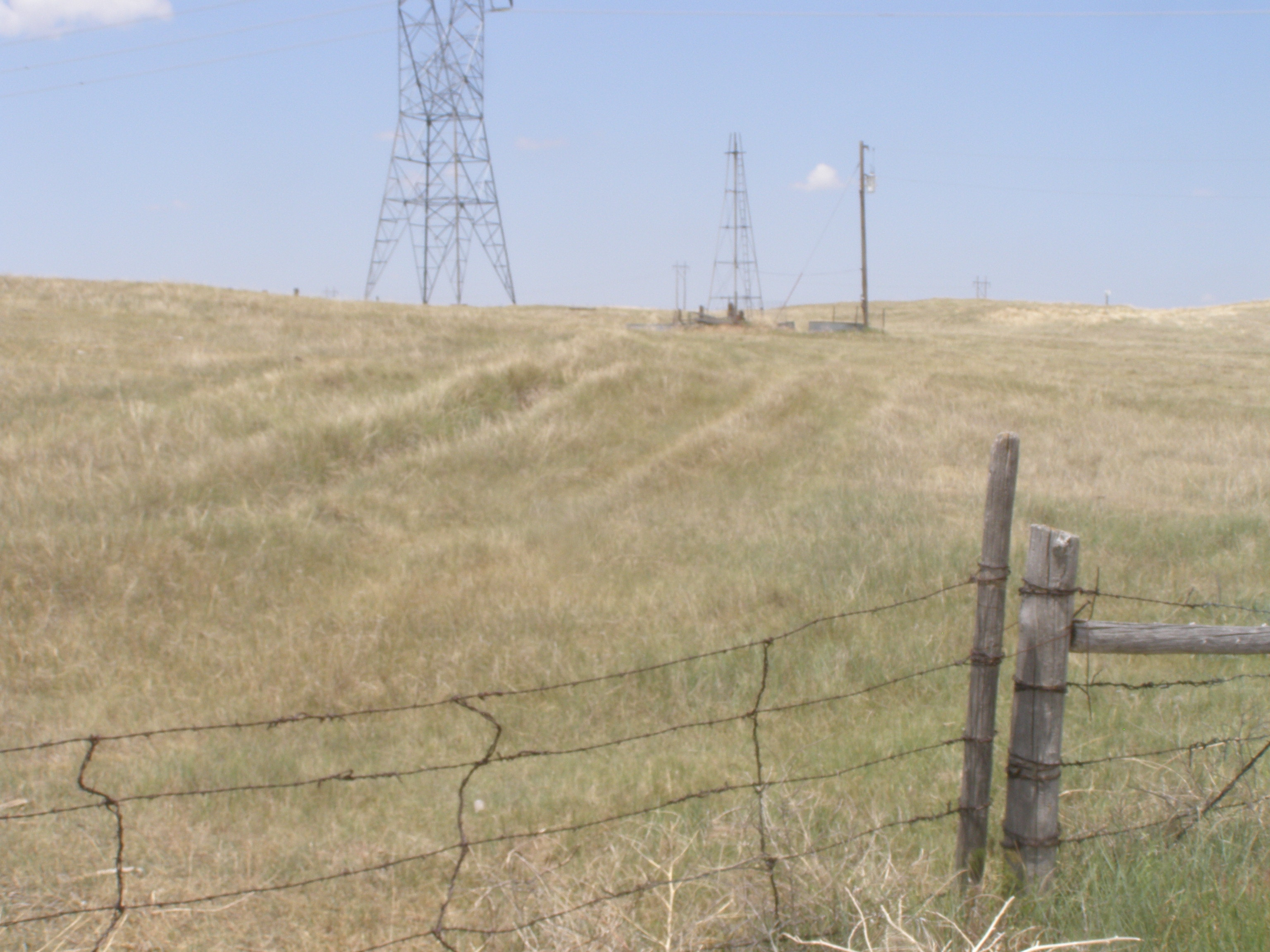
- California Hill, rising from the South Platte River Valley to the crest to reach the North Platte River on the California and Oregon Trails.

- Location within Nebraska
- Nearest city: Brule, Nebraska
- Coordinates: 41°6′2.55″N 101°58′53.58″W
- Area: 140 acres (57 ha)
- Built: 1847
- NRHP reference No.: 74001126
- Added to NRHP: July 15, 1974

California Hill is a hill in Nebraska, and the first major hill ascended by emigrants on the Oregon Trail. East of O'Fallon's Bluffs, the trail begins to turn southward along the South Platte River. The migrants had to make a decision of where to cross the river and then over the divide between the north and south branches of the Platte River. The North Platte River was the preferred route towards Fort Laramie and Casper, Wyoming. A variety of fords was used, but the most often chosen was named the California Crossing. Having travelled 53 miles (85 km) west of O'Fallon's Bluffs this crossing was the most direct to Ash Hollow and the North Platte River. While shallow, the South Platte's sandy bottom created a major obstacle for heavy wagons. Quicksand and moving water were the cause of wrecks, drownings, and deaths from exposure. This was accentuated as the main crossing season was in May and early June when the rivers became swollen from the spring melt in the Rocky Mountains to the west. Once over, the emigrants faced California Hill. This climb of 240 feet (73 m) was over a 1.5 kilometres (0.93 mi) before reaching the plateau that stretches between the two forks of the Platte. While not as steep as the hills ahead of them on the trail, this was the first major hill that they faced.

== Current status ==
The South Platte River has changed since the era of the wagon trains due to the growth of brush, and other vegetation, and changes created by the division of water for irrigation of the fields along the valley. Trail ruts are visible for almost 0.75 miles (1.21 km) to the southeast reaching U.S. Highway 30 and for 0.5 miles (0.80 km) to the northwest disappearing into the cultivated field on the plateau. The ruts leading up from U.S. 30 are gentle swales covered by native grasses, yucca, and cactus. To the northwest, the ruts appear as cuts in the hillside.
