= Keystone, Nebraska =

- Census-designated place
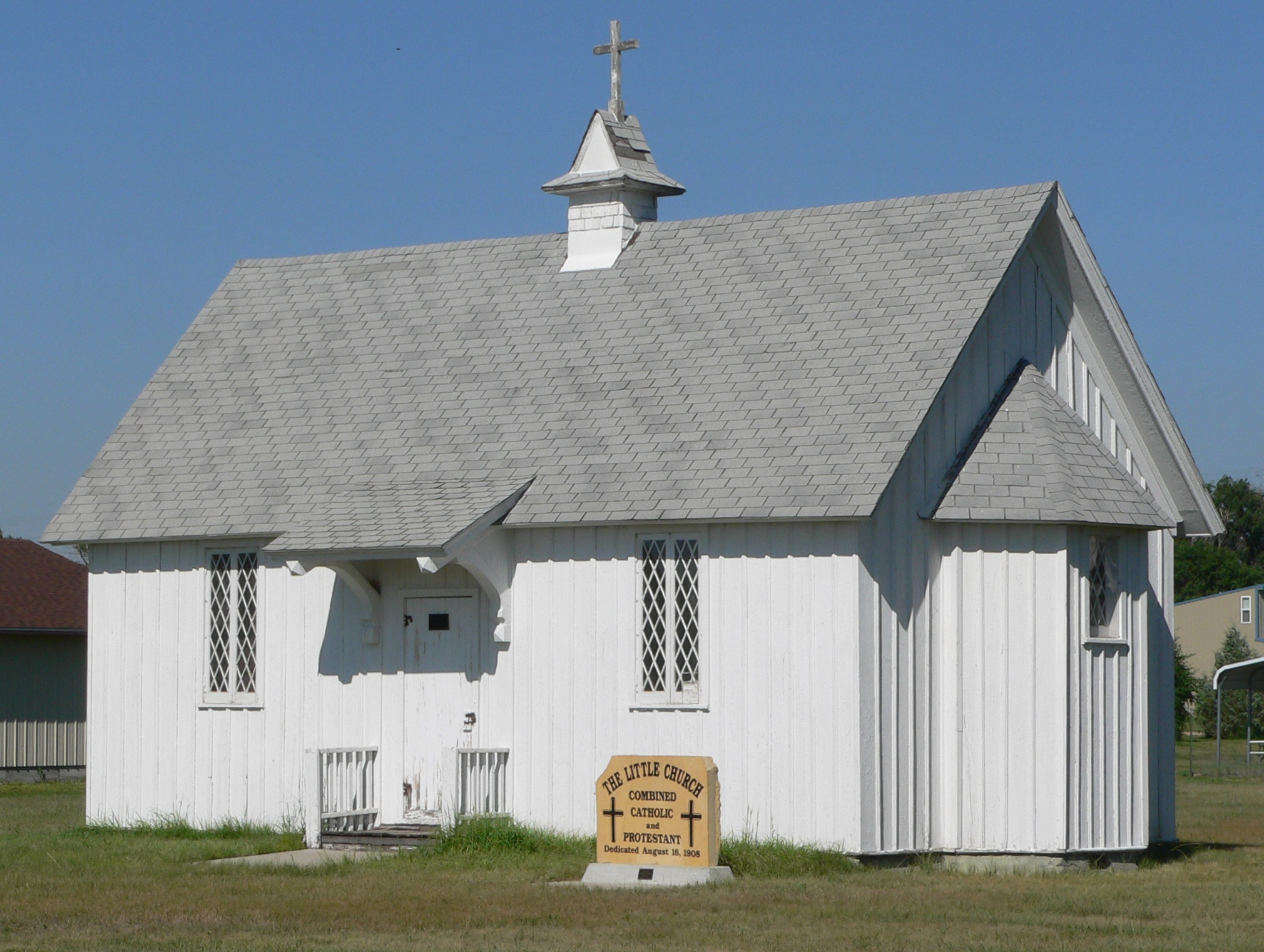
- The Little Church in Keystone is listed in the National Register of Historic Places

- Location within Nebraska Location within the United States
- Coordinates: 41°13′07″N 101°35′03″W
- Country: United States
- State: Nebraska
- County: Keith

Area
  - Total: 0.20 sq mi (0.52 km^{2})
  - Land: 0.20 sq mi (0.52 km^{2})
  - Water: 0 sq mi (0.00 km^{2})
- Elevation: 3,101 ft (945 m)

Population (2020)
  - Total: 73
  - Density: 364.1/sq mi (140.57/km^{2})
- Time zone: UTC-6 (Mountain (MST))
  - Summer (DST): UTC-5 (MDT)
- ZIP code: 69144
- FIPS code: 31-25335
- GNIS feature ID: 2583884

Keystone is an unincorporated community and census-designated place (CDP) in central Keith County, Nebraska, United States. As of the 2020 census its population was 73.

It lies along local roads near the North Platte River, 13 miles (21 km) northeast of the city of Ogallala, the county seat of Keith County. Its elevation is 3,100 feet (940 m) above sea level. Although Keystone is unincorporated, it has a post office, with the ZIP code of 69144.

== History ==
Keystone got its start following construction of the Union Pacific Railroad through the territory.

=== Historical site ===
Keystone is home to the Little Church at Keystone, designed by Thomas R. Kimball and built in 1908. The town was too small to hold two churches, so several community members funded the construction through bake sales. The church has a Catholic altar on one end, a Protestant lectern at the other, and hinged pews to make the seats reversible.

== Geography ==
=== Climate ===
According to the Köppen Climate Classification system, Keystone has a humid subtropical climate, abbreviated "Cfa" on climate maps. The hottest temperature recorded in Keystone was 111 °F (43.9 °C) on July 20, 1939 and July 11, 1954, while the coldest temperature recorded was −25 °F (−31.7 °C) on December 22, 1989.

Climate data for Kingsley Dam, Nebraska, 1991–2020 normals, extremes 1938–present
Month	Jan	Feb	Mar	Apr	May	Jun	Jul	Aug	Sep	Oct	Nov	Dec	Year
Record high °F (°C)	70 (21)	79 (26)	87 (31)	94 (34)	101 (38)	107 (42)	111 (44)	106 (41)	103 (39)	96 (36)	83 (28)	77 (25)	111 (44)
Mean maximum °F (°C)	58.8 (14.9)	64.6 (18.1)	75.7 (24.3)	83.7 (28.7)	91.3 (32.9)	97.3 (36.3)	101.0 (38.3)	98.3 (36.8)	95.4 (35.2)	85.4 (29.7)	71.9 (22.2)	61.1 (16.2)	101.8 (38.8)
Mean daily maximum °F (°C)	36.3 (2.4)	39.6 (4.2)	50.8 (10.4)	58.9 (14.9)	69.0 (20.6)	80.7 (27.1)	87.0 (30.6)	84.8 (29.3)	76.7 (24.8)	62.0 (16.7)	48.6 (9.2)	38.3 (3.5)	61.1 (16.1)
Daily mean °F (°C)	27.0 (−2.8)	29.3 (−1.5)	39.2 (4.0)	47.6 (8.7)	58.0 (14.4)	68.9 (20.5)	74.9 (23.8)	72.9 (22.7)	64.3 (17.9)	50.6 (10.3)	38.5 (3.6)	29.3 (−1.5)	50.0 (10.0)
Mean daily minimum °F (°C)	17.7 (−7.9)	19.1 (−7.2)	27.6 (−2.4)	36.2 (2.3)	47.1 (8.4)	57.2 (14.0)	62.8 (17.1)	61.0 (16.1)	51.8 (11.0)	39.1 (3.9)	28.4 (−2.0)	20.3 (−6.5)	39.0 (3.9)
Mean minimum °F (°C)	−1.4 (−18.6)	0.6 (−17.4)	10.2 (−12.1)	22.6 (−5.2)	34.3 (1.3)	46.9 (8.3)	54.2 (12.3)	51.6 (10.9)	38.2 (3.4)	23.0 (−5.0)	12.1 (−11.1)	1.9 (−16.7)	−8.0 (−22.2)
Record low °F (°C)	−2 (−19)	−24 (−31)	−21 (−29)	5 (−15)	23 (−5)	33 (1)	44 (7)	43 (6)	23 (−5)	−1 (−18)	−7 (−22)	−25 (−32)	−25 (−32)
Average precipitation inches (mm)	0.33 (8.4)	0.61 (15)	0.92 (23)	2.08 (53)	3.35 (85)	3.24 (82)	2.84 (72)	1.99 (51)	1.58 (40)	1.35 (34)	0.51 (13)	0.41 (10)	19.21 (486.4)
Average snowfall inches (cm)	4.0 (10)	5.2 (13)	3.2 (8.1)	2.3 (5.8)	0.2 (0.51)	0.0 (0.0)	0.0 (0.0)	0.0 (0.0)	0.0 (0.0)	0.9 (2.3)	2.1 (5.3)	3.5 (8.9)	21.4 (53.91)
Average precipitation days (≥ 0.01 in)	3.2	5.3	5.5	7.5	10.9	10.3	8.4	7.8	6.1	6.2	3.6	3.4	78.2
Average snowy days (≥ 0.1 in)	2.8	4.3	2.3	1.4	0.2	0.0	0.0	0.0	0.0	0.5	2.1	3.0	16.6
Source 1: NOAA
Source 2: National Weather Service

== Demographics ==
Historical population
Census	Pop.	Note	%±
2020	73		—
U.S. Decennial Census
