= Brûlée River (Sautauriski River tributary) =

River in Quebec, Canada

Coordinates: 47.3344°N 71.2755°W

Brûlée River (French: Rivière Brûlée) is a 12-kilometre (7.5 mi) long river in Jacques-Cartier National Park, La Jacques-Cartier in the Capitale-Nationale administrative region of Quebec, Canada. Rising in the small lake of lac Ménard in the La Côte-de-Beaupré Regional County Municipality, Rivière Brûlée is a tributary of the Sautauriski River, and flows southerly for its entire course.

== Etymology ==
Brûlée is the feminine singular of brûlé, which in French means "burnt." According to the Commission de toponymie du Québec, the name Brûlée was first used for the river since at least 1929, but it was not officially designated as such until 7 October 2021.
