= Brule River State Forest =

Wisconsin State Forest

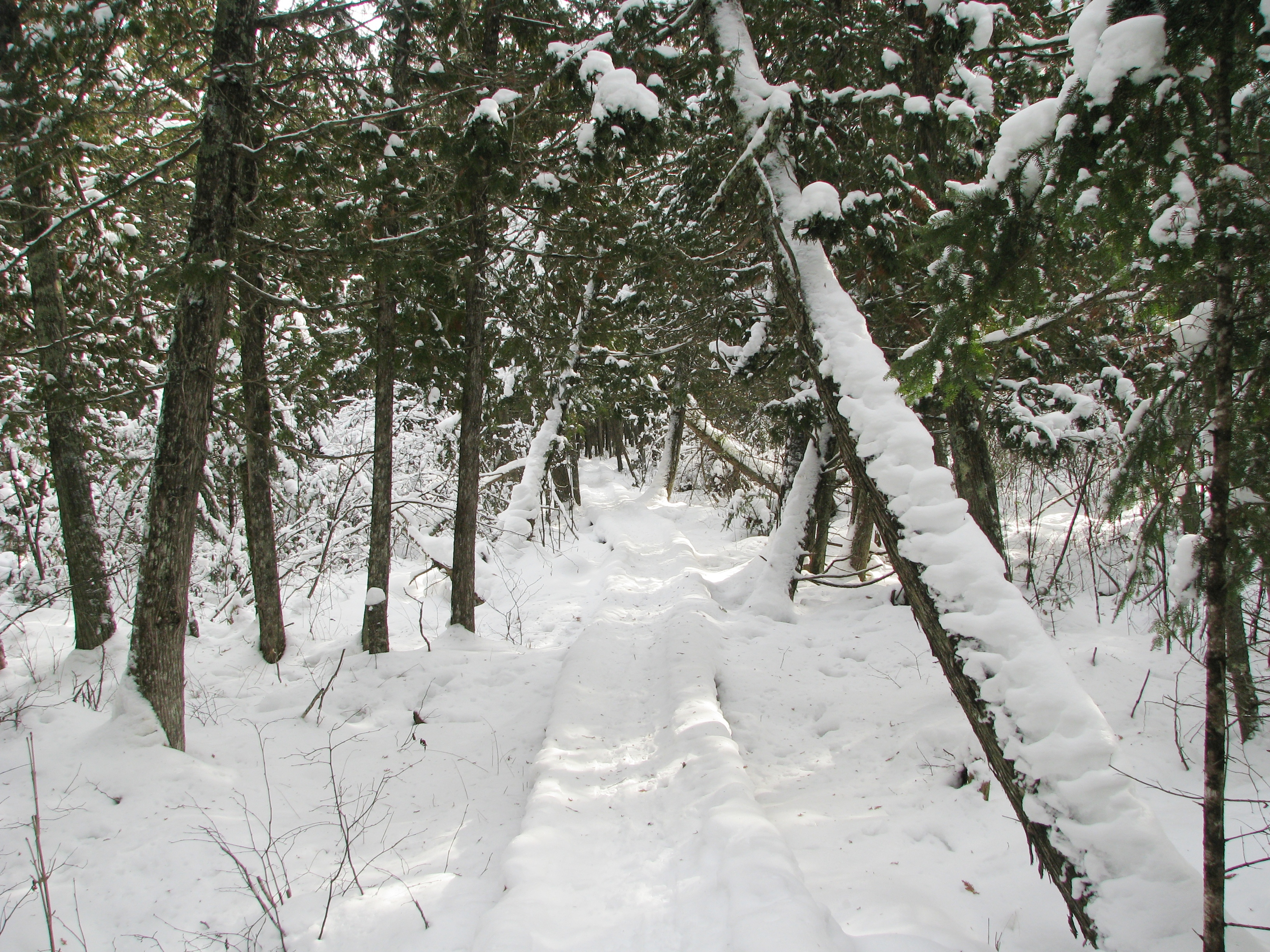
- The North Country Trail passes through the Brule Bog near the southern boundary of the forest

- Location within Wisconsin Location within the United States
- Interactive map of Brule River State Forest
- Location: Douglas County, Wisconsin, United States
- Coordinates: 46°32′31″N 91°35′9″W
- Area: 47,000 acres (19,000 ha)
- Established: 1907
- Administrator: Wisconsin Department of Natural Resources
- Website: Official website
- Wisconsin State Forests

Brule River State Forest is a state forest located in Douglas County, Wisconsin, that encompasses the Bois Brule River for most of its length from its headwaters to Lake Superior. It is administered by the Wisconsin Department of Natural Resources and is nearly 47,000 acres (190 km^{2}) in size, making it the fourth-largest state park in Wisconsin. It was founded in 1907 and is the second oldest state park in the state, after Interstate Park.

The Cedar Island Lodge, where President Calvin Coolidge vacationed in the summer of 1928, is located here. The state forest is popular with canoeists and cross-country skiers.
