= KOGA (AM) =

- Ogallala, Nebraska; United States
- Broadcast area: Nebraska High Plains
- Frequency: 930 kHz
- Branding: NewsRadio 930 KOGA

Programming
- Format: News/talk
- Affiliations: Fox News Radio; Compass Media Networks; Premiere Networks

Ownership
- Owner: iHeartMedia, Inc.; (iHM Licenses, LLC)
- Sister stations: KOGA-FM

History
- First air date: January 28, 1955
- Call sign meaning: "Ogallala"

Technical information
- Licensing authority: FCC
- Facility ID: 50065
- Class: B
- Power: 2,100 watts day 500 watts night
- Transmitter coordinates: 41°8′33″N 101°42′49.6″W

Links
- Public license information: Public file; LMS
- Webcast: Listen Live
- Website: 930koga.iheart.com

KOGA (930 kHz) is an AM radio station broadcasting a news/talk format that is licensed to Ogallala, Nebraska, United States. It is owned by iHeartMedia and features programming from ABC Radio and Westwood One.

== Awards ==
The station was a finalist for the 2008 Crystal Radio Award for public service awarded by the National Association of Broadcasters.

== Change to classic country ==
In January 2019, KOGA changed their format from adult standards to classic country.
