= Ruthton, Nebraska =

Unincorporated community in Nebraska, U.S.

Coordinates: 41°18′40″N 102°00′39″W

Ruthton is an unincorporated community in Keith County, Nebraska, United States.

== History ==
Ruthton got its start, following construction of the Union Pacific Railroad through the territory.
