= Crème Brûlée (disambiguation) =

Crème brûlée is a French dessert.

Crème brûlée, or its anglicized form Creme Brulee, may also refer to:

- "Crème Brûlée", a song by David Archuleta from Earthly Delights (2025)
- "Crème Brûlée", a song by GFriend from Song of the Sirens (2020)
- "Crème Brûlée", a song by King Hannah (2020)
- "Crème Brûlée", a song by Shea Couleé (2018)
- "Creme Brulee", a song by Shrimp Boat (1993)
- "Crème Brûlée", a song by Sonic Youth from Dirty (1992)
