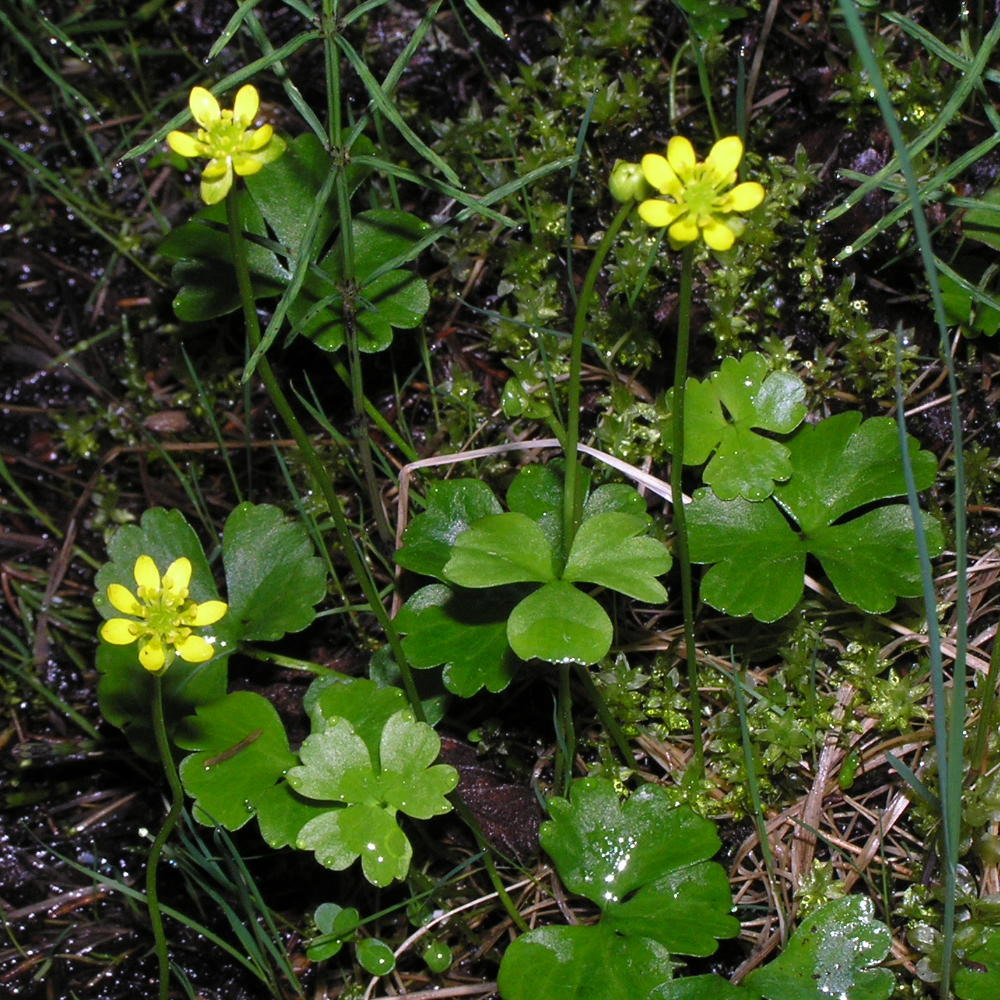

Scientific classification
- Kingdom: Plantae
- Clade: Tracheophytes
- Clade: Angiosperms
- Clade: Eudicots
- Order: Ranunculales
- Family: Ranunculaceae
- Genus: Ranunculus
- Species: R. lapponicus

Binomial name
- Ranunculus lapponicus L.

= Ranunculus lapponicus =

Species of buttercup

Ranunculus lapponicus, the Lapland buttercup, is distributed all over the arctic, with the exception of northern and eastern Greenland.

It is a low, prostrate plant with a creeping, underground stem (rhizome) which sends out long stalks and shoots bearing the flowers. The leaves are deeply tripartite, forming 3 lobes which are toothed or crenated. The flowers are yellow, solitary, generally having 6 (8) petals that are distinctly longer than the sepals. After flowering, the fruit forms a globular head of carpels held above the creeping plant.

It grows in wet localities, especially in moss carpets along beaches, streams and lakes.
