= USS Brule =

Two ships of the United States Navy have been named Brule after a county in south central South Dakota, established on 14 January 1875 and named for the Brule subdivision of the Sioux Indians.

- USS Brule (APA-66), was commissioned on 31 October 1944.
- USS Brule (AKL-28), was commissioned on 31 October 1952.
