= Arolla Glacier =

Glacier situated in the Pennine Alps

- Glacier d'Arolla
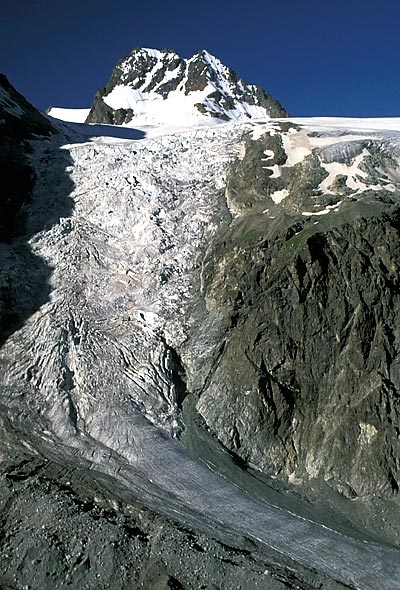
- Interactive map of Arolla Glacier
- Location: Valais, Switzerland
- Coordinates: 45°59′31″N 7°29′41″E
- Length: 4 kilometres (2.5 mi)

The Arolla Glacier (French: Glacier d'Arolla) is a 4 km (2.5 mi) long glacier (2005) situated in the Pennine Alps in the canton of Valais in Switzerland. In 1973, it had an area of 13.17 km^{2} (5.08 sq mi).

The Glacier d'Arolla is in fact composed of two glaciers: the Glacier du Mont Collon and the Haut Glacier d'Arolla.

== Description ==
The Glacier du Mont Collon has a length of almost 5 km and a width of about 1 km at the top. It covers an area of 7 km^{2} (2.7 sq mi). It begins on the tips of Oren (3525 m) and flows north through a corridor bordered by the Little Mount Collon (3,556 m) and Bishop (3716 m) west, and Mont Collon in the east. It is connected to the west by the glacial Otemma Chermotane Pass (3050 m), a wide passage covered with ice. On the west side of Mount Collon, the glacier undergoes a vertical drop of 600 meters with a slope of 60%.

== Bas Glacier ==
The part that follows this steep descent is called "Bas Arolla glacier". It continues for about 1 kilometer to the north and the ice tongue stops at an altitude of 2160 meters (status 2007). The glacier emerges from the Borgne d'Arolla which then joins the Borgne Ferpècle then flows into the Val d'Herens before confluence with the Rhone plain.

== Haut Glacier d'Arolla ==
In the valley located east of Mount Collon is the "Haut Glacier d'Arolla", with a length of 4 km and a width of 1 km. Its area is 5 km^{2} (1.9 sq mi). It originates from the snowfields hanging north of Mount Brulé (or Mount Braoulé, 3585 m) and then descends with a slope of 12 to 15% towards the northwest and then north. The glacier tongue ends at an altitude of 2550 m (status 2007).

== See also ==
- List of glaciers in Switzerland
- List of glaciers
- Retreat of glaciers since 1850
- Swiss Alps
