= Mont Brûlé (Val d'Entremont) =

Mountain in Switzerland

- Location within Switzerland

Highest point
- Elevation: 2,572 m (8,438 ft)
- Prominence: 100 m (330 ft)
- Coordinates: 46°1′3.5″N 7°12′2.7″E

Geography
- Location: Valais, Switzerland
- Parent range: Pennine Alps

Mont Brûlé is a mountain of the Swiss Pennine Alps, overlooking Orsières in the canton of Valais. It lies just north of Col de Mille.
