= Bois Brule River =

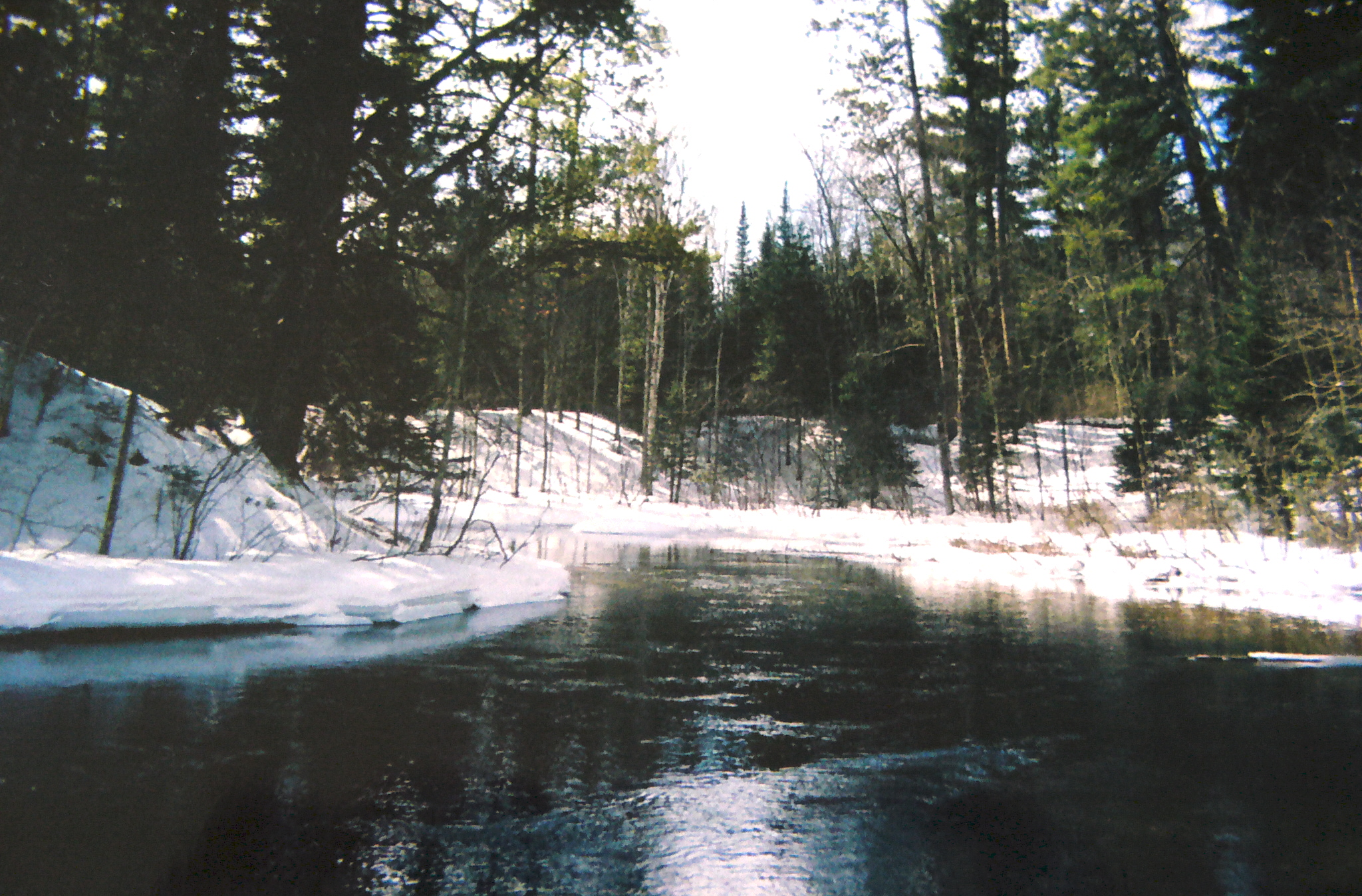
- Bois Brule River near Winneboujou, Wisconsin

Location
- Country: United States
- Location: Douglas County, Wisconsin

Physical characteristics
- Source
  - elevation: 600 ft (180 m)
- Mouth
  - location: Lake Superior
  - coordinates: 46.4027187°N 91.7438003°W
- Length: 43.9 mi (70.7 km)

Basin features
- GNIS: 1562037

The Bois Brule River (most often referred to as the Brule River) is located in Douglas County, Wisconsin, United States, near the county's eastern border with Bayfield County. The river is 43.9 miles (70.7 km) long, with its source being in central Douglas County near Upper St. Croix Lake. It flows through the Brule River State Forest, and drains into Lake Superior.

The river is called Wiisaakode-ziibi ("a river through a half-burnt woods") in the Anishinaabe language, which was translated into French and incorporated into English. It was the site of the 1842 Battle of the Brule between the La Pointe Band of Ojibwe and a group of Dakota Sioux.

In 1928, United States President Calvin Coolidge maintained a summer residence, known as the "Summer White House", at the Cedar Island Lodge, located on the upper Bois Brule River. Since then, the property has been purchased by the founders of 3M, the Ordways.

The river is known for its trout fishing and white-water canoeing, and is revered by fly fishermen for its prolific mayfly and stone fly hatches. The Wisconsin Department of Natural Resources has a fish hatchery and a ranger station that operates the state forest and nearby campgrounds.
