= Keith County, Nebraska =

County in Nebraska, United States

- County
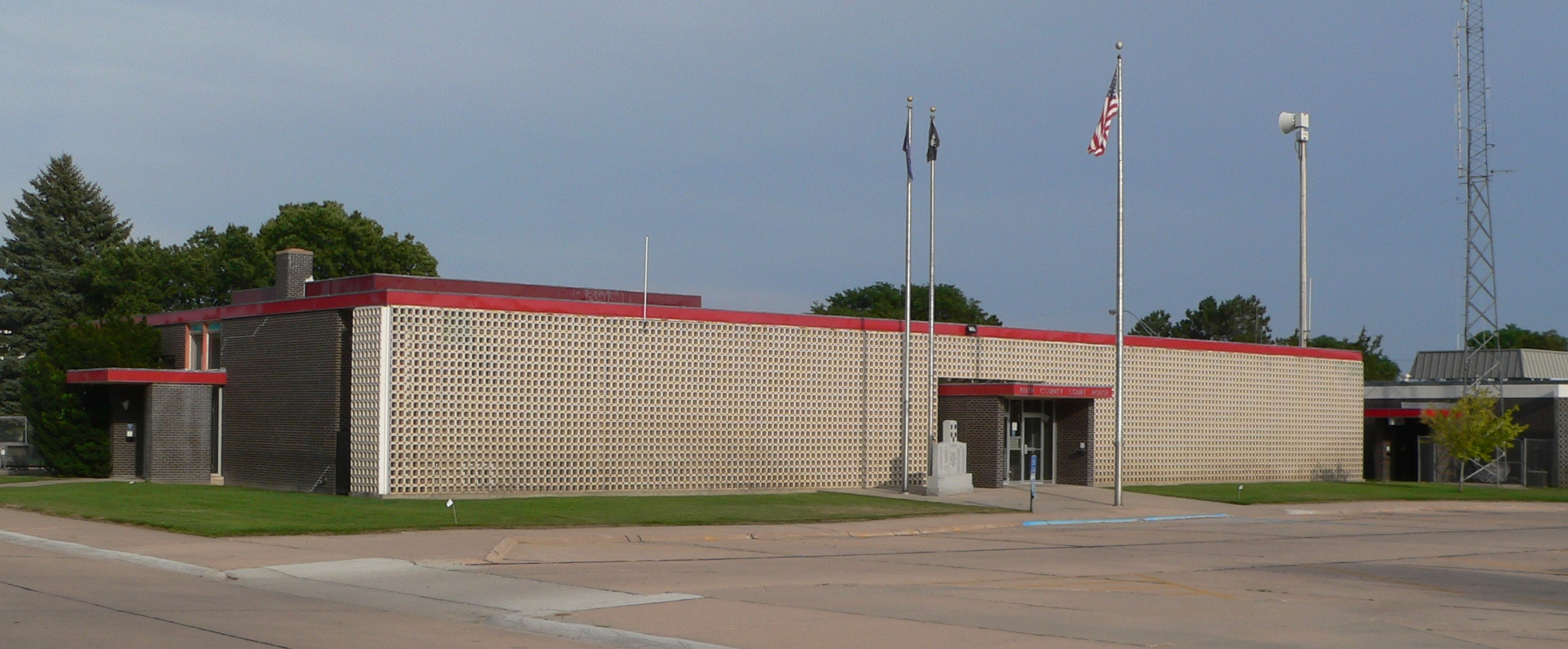
- Keith County Courthouse in Ogallala

- Location within the U.S. state of Nebraska
- Coordinates: 41°12′N 101°40′W
- Country: United States
- State: Nebraska
- Founded: 1873
- Named for: M.C. Keith or John Keith
- Seat: Ogallala
- Largest city: Ogallala

Area
  - Total: 1,110 sq mi (2,900 km^{2})
  - Land: 1,062 sq mi (2,750 km^{2})
  - Water: 48 sq mi (120 km^{2}) 4.3%

Population (2020)
  - Total: 8,335
  - Estimate (2025): 8,100 ▼
  - Density: 7.848/sq mi (3.030/km^{2})
- Time zone: UTC−7 (Mountain)
  - Summer (DST): UTC−6 (MDT)
- Congressional district: 3rd
- Website: www.keithcountyne.gov

Keith County is a county in the U.S. state of Nebraska. As of the 2020 United States census, the population was 8,335. Its county seat is Ogallala.

In the Nebraska license plate system, Keith County is represented by the prefix 68 (it had the sixty-eighth-largest number of vehicles registered in the county when the license plate system was established in 1922).

== History ==
The first white people in the area were trappers active before the 1850s. The land was crossed by almost 350,000 during the Pike's Peak gold rush. Settlement was driven by ranching and cattle driving. In 1873, the settlers petitioned governor Robert Furnas to give them a county. The county was named for Morell Case Keith, grandfather of Keith Neville, a prolific rancher and real estate developer active in the area as well as in North Platte, who supported irrigation to the area. By 1873 he had a stock of cattle worth US$93,000.

== Geography ==
The terrain of Keith County consists of low rolling hills. The level areas are used for agriculture, mainly in the lower part of the county. The North Platte River flows eastward into the northwest end of the county, feeding Lake McConaughy, then exiting the county's east line near its midpoint. The South Platte River flows eastward into the southwest end of the county, and crosses the lower central part of the county before exiting to the east, headed for its junction with the North Platte River well to the east of Keith County.

The county has an area of 1,110 square miles (2,900 km^{2}), of which 1,062 square miles (2,750 km^{2}) is land and 48 square miles (120 km^{2}) (4.3%) is water.

Most of Nebraska's 93 counties (the eastern 2/3) observe Central Time; the western counties observe Mountain Time. Keith County is the easternmost of the Nebraska counties to observe Mountain Time.

=== Major highways ===
- Interstate 80
- U.S. Highway 26
- U.S. Highway 30
- Nebraska Highway 61
- Nebraska Highway 92

=== Transit ===
- Burlington Trailways
- Express Arrow
- Ogallala Public Transit

=== Adjacent counties ===
- Arthur County – north
- McPherson County – northeast (boundary of Central Time)
- Lincoln County – east (boundary of Central Time)
- Perkins County – south
- Deuel County – west
- Garden County – northwest

=== Protected areas ===
- Clear Creek State Waterfowl Management Area (partial)
- Lake McConaughy State Recreation Area

== Demographics ==
Historical population
Census	Pop.	Note	%±
1880	194		—
1890	2,556		1,217.5%
1900	1,951		−23.7%
1910	3,692		89.2%
1920	5,294		43.4%
1930	6,721		27.0%
1940	8,333		24.0%
1950	7,449		−10.6%
1960	7,958		6.8%
1970	8,487		6.6%
1980	9,364		10.3%
1990	8,584		−8.3%
2000	8,875		3.4%
2010	8,368		−5.7%
2020	8,335		−0.4%
2025 (est.)	8,100	▼	−2.8%
U.S. Decennial Census; 1790-1960 1900-1990; 1990-2000 2010 2020 2022

=== 2020 census ===
As of the 2020 census, the county had a population of 8,335. The median age was 47.2 years. 21.8% of residents were under the age of 18 and 25.4% of residents were 65 years of age or older. For every 100 females there were 98.7 males, and for every 100 females age 18 and over there were 96.6 males age 18 and over.

The racial makeup of the county was 90.1% White, 0.2% Black or African American, 0.4% American Indian and Alaska Native, 0.6% Asian, 0.1% Native Hawaiian and Pacific Islander, 2.9% from some other race, and 5.8% from two or more races. Hispanic or Latino residents of any race comprised 9.0% of the population.

56.6% of residents lived in urban areas, while 43.4% lived in rural areas.

There were 3,672 households in the county, of which 24.6% had children under the age of 18 living with them and 23.1% had a female householder with no spouse or partner present. About 31.9% of all households were made up of individuals and 16.8% had someone living alone who was 65 years of age or older.

There were 5,342 housing units, of which 31.3% were vacant. Among occupied housing units, 73.1% were owner-occupied and 26.9% were renter-occupied. The homeowner vacancy rate was 1.4% and the rental vacancy rate was 12.0%.

=== 2000 census ===
As of the census of 2000, there were 8,875 people, 3,707 households, and 2,535 families residing in the county. The population density was 8 people per square mile (3.1 people/km^{2}). There were 5,178 housing units at an average density of 5 units per square mile (1.9/km^{2}). The racial makeup of the county was 96.75% White, 0.08% Black or African American, 0.71% Native American, 0.17% Asian, 1.49% from other races, and 0.80% from two or more races. 4.23% of the population were Hispanic or Latino of any race.

There were 3,707 households, out of which 30.20% had children under the age of 18 living with them, 58.60% were married couples living together, 7.00% had a female householder with no husband present, and 31.60% were non-families. 27.90% of all households were made up of individuals, and 13.50% had someone living alone who was 65 years of age or older. The average household size was 2.37 and the average family size was 2.89.

In the county, the population was spread out, with 25.30% under the age of 18, 5.70% from 18 to 24, 25.30% from 25 to 44, 25.40% from 45 to 64, and 18.40% who were 65 years of age or older. The median age was 41 years. For every 100 females there were 96.50 males. For every 100 females age 18 and over, there were 92.80 males.

The median income for a household in the county was $32,325, and the median income for a family was $39,118. Males had a median income of $26,523 versus $19,024 for females. The per capita income for the county was $17,421. About 6.60% of families and 9.30% of the population were below the poverty line, including 13.10% of those under age 18 and 8.20% of those age 65 or over.

== Communities ==
=== City ===
- Ogallala (county seat)

=== Villages ===
- Brule
- Paxton

=== Census-designated places ===
- Belmar
- Keystone
- Lemoyne
- Martin
- Roscoe
- Sarben

=== Unincorporated communities ===
- Nevens
- Ruthton

=== Former communities ===
- Alkali
- Bertha
- Conditville
- Eckeryville
- Korty
- Megeath
- Oren
- Pickard
- Plano

== Politics ==
United States presidential election results for Keith County, Nebraska
Year	Republican		Democratic		Third party(ies)	
Year	No.	%	No.	%	No.	%
1880	32	38.55%	51	61.45%	0	0.00%
1884	67	47.86%	72	51.43%	1	0.71%
1888	319	50.08%	263	41.29%	55	8.63%
1892	210	37.84%	98	17.66%	247	44.50%
1896	178	39.64%	269	59.91%	2	0.45%
1900	246	52.34%	216	45.96%	8	1.70%
1904	263	60.18%	89	20.37%	85	19.45%
1908	368	53.41%	310	44.99%	11	1.60%
1912	188	23.04%	304	37.25%	324	39.71%
1916	389	39.06%	544	54.62%	63	6.33%
1920	1,050	64.73%	472	29.10%	100	6.17%
1924	1,069	49.93%	602	28.12%	470	21.95%
1928	1,715	67.10%	832	32.55%	9	0.35%
1932	946	31.63%	2,009	67.17%	36	1.20%
1936	1,094	34.71%	2,000	63.45%	58	1.84%
1940	2,022	53.48%	1,759	46.52%	0	0.00%
1944	1,739	60.26%	1,147	39.74%	0	0.00%
1948	1,600	59.06%	1,109	40.94%	0	0.00%
1952	2,790	78.39%	769	21.61%	0	0.00%
1956	2,624	73.83%	930	26.17%	0	0.00%
1960	2,680	68.88%	1,211	31.12%	0	0.00%
1964	1,927	51.93%	1,784	48.07%	0	0.00%
1968	2,126	70.91%	694	23.15%	178	5.94%
1972	2,513	79.07%	665	20.93%	0	0.00%
1976	2,485	66.09%	1,139	30.29%	136	3.62%
1980	3,381	77.65%	710	16.31%	263	6.04%
1984	3,433	84.10%	631	15.46%	18	0.44%
1988	2,886	72.31%	1,075	26.94%	30	0.75%
1992	2,050	51.65%	740	18.64%	1,179	29.71%
1996	2,504	65.50%	830	21.71%	489	12.79%
2000	2,953	76.72%	778	20.21%	118	3.07%
2004	3,356	81.12%	743	17.96%	38	0.92%
2008	2,942	74.14%	974	24.55%	52	1.31%
2012	3,044	75.01%	928	22.87%	86	2.12%
2016	3,235	80.19%	571	14.15%	228	5.65%
2020	3,544	81.12%	763	17.46%	62	1.42%
2024	3,416	81.16%	731	17.37%	62	1.47%

== See also ==
- National Register of Historic Places listings in Keith County, Nebraska
