= Brule, Nebraska =

- Village
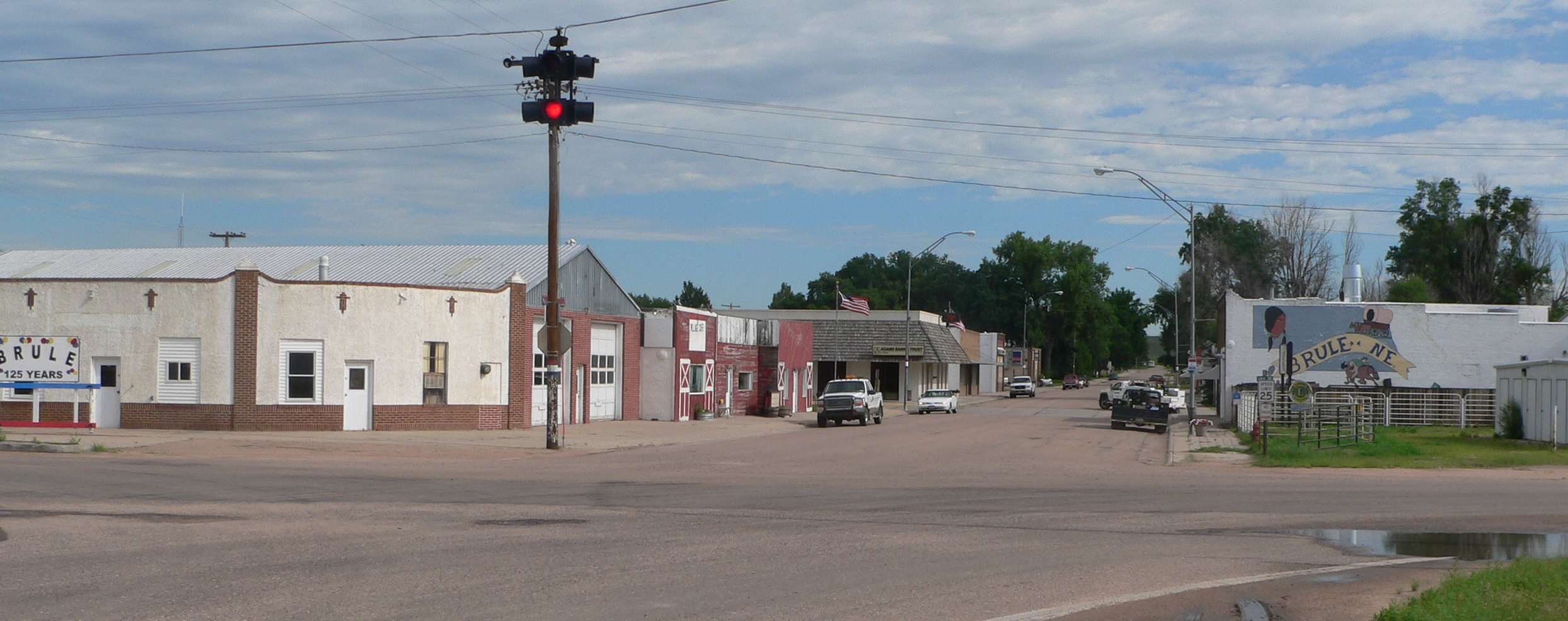
- Downtown Brule, seen from south of U.S. Highway 30
- Motto: "Come On In...Visit & Relax"
- Location of Brule, Nebraska
- Coordinates: 41°05′41″N 101°53′19″W
- Country: United States
- State: Nebraska
- County: Keith

Area
  - Total: 0.31 sq mi (0.80 km^{2})
  - Land: 0.31 sq mi (0.80 km^{2})
  - Water: 0 sq mi (0.00 km^{2})
- Elevation: 3,291 ft (1,003 m)

Population (2020)
  - Total: 331
  - Density: 1,071.1/sq mi (413.54/km^{2})
- Time zone: UTC-7 (Mountain (MST))
  - Summer (DST): UTC-6 (MDT)
- ZIP code: 69127
- Area code: 308
- FIPS code: 31-06785
- GNIS feature ID: 2397475
- Website: ci.brule.ne.us

Brule is a village in Keith County, Nebraska, United States. As of the 2020 census, Brule had a population of 331. The village is named after the Brule Sioux, who camped at that location.

== History ==
The village was founded in 1886 with the purchase of a quarter acre of land. The arrival of the Union Pacific Railroad helped the village grow. Major Isaac Barton and his wife Elizabeth purchased the land.

== Geography ==
According to the United States Census Bureau, the village has a total area of 0.31 square miles (0.80 km^{2}), all land.

The village is located on U.S. Route 30 and is one mile north of Interstate 80.

== Demographics ==
Historical population
Census	Pop.	Note	%±
1930	329		—
1940	581		76.6%
1950	330		−43.2%
1960	370		12.1%
1970	423		14.3%
1980	438		3.5%
1990	411		−6.2%
2000	372		−9.5%
2010	326		−12.4%
2020	331		1.5%
U.S. Decennial Census

=== 2010 census ===
As of the census of 2010, there were 326 people, 156 households, and 91 families residing in the village. The population density was 1,051.6 inhabitants per square mile (406.0/km^{2}). There were 185 housing units at an average density of 596.8 per square mile (230.4/km^{2}). The racial makeup of the village was 98.5% White, 0.3% African American, 0.6% from other races, and 0.6% from two or more races. Hispanic or Latino of any race were 5.5% of the population.

There were 156 households, of which 21.8% had children under the age of 18 living with them, 49.4% were married couples living together, 5.1% had a female householder with no husband present, 3.8% had a male householder with no wife present, and 41.7% were non-families. 36.5% of all households were made up of individuals, and 19.9% had someone living alone who was 65 years of age or older. The average household size was 2.09 and the average family size was 2.69.

The median age in the village was 50 years. 18.7% of residents were under the age of 18; 4.9% were between the ages of 18 and 24; 18.1% were from 25 to 44; 33.4% were from 45 to 64; and 24.8% were 65 years of age or older. The gender makeup of the village was 50.3% male and 49.7% female.

=== 2000 census ===
As of the census of 2000, there were 372 people, 169 households, and 111 families residing in the village. The population density was 1,253.9 inhabitants per square mile (484.1/km^{2}). There were 190 housing units at an average density of 640.4 per square mile (247.3/km^{2}). The racial makeup of the village was 93.55% White, 1.08% Native American, 3.76% from other races, and 1.61% from two or more races. Hispanic or Latino of any race were 7.26% of the population.

There were 169 households, out of which 23.1% had children under the age of 18 living with them, 56.8% were married couples living together, 6.5% had a female householder with no husband present, and 34.3% were non-families. 30.8% of all households were made up of individuals, and 17.2% had someone living alone who was 65 years of age or older. The average household size was 2.20 and the average family size was 2.77.

In the village, the population was spread out, with 21.0% under the age of 18, 3.8% from 18 to 24, 22.8% from 25 to 44, 25.8% from 45 to 64, and 26.6% who were 65 years of age or older. The median age was 47 years. For every 100 females, there were 101.1 males. For every 100 females age 18 and over, there were 94.7 males.

As of 2000 the median income for a household in the village was $23,036, and the median income for a family was $34,063. Males had a median income of $24,583 versus $17,404 for females. The per capita income for the village was $14,530. About 7.9% of families and 10.1% of the population were below the poverty line, including 13.0% of those under age 18 and 12.4% of those age 65 or over.

== Tourism ==
The village celebrates Brule Day every year on the first Saturday in August. The festivities attract tourists from far away, who come to Brule to experience the small town atmosphere it provides.
