= Ogallala, Nebraska =

Ogallala
- City
- Downtown (2026)

- Location of Ogallala, Nebraska
- Coordinates: 41°07′46″N 101°43′15″W
- Country: United States
- State: Nebraska
- County: Keith
- Founded: 1868

Government
  - Type: City Council/City Manager
  - Mayor: Deb Schilz
  - City Manager: Bruce Smith

Area
  - Total: 5.02 sq mi (13.00 km^{2})
  - Land: 4.96 sq mi (12.84 km^{2})
  - Water: 0.062 sq mi (0.16 km^{2})
- Elevation: 3,232 ft (985 m)

Population (2020)
  - Total: 4,878
  - Density: 984.1/sq mi (379.96/km^{2})
- Time zone: UTC-7 (Mountain (MST))
  - Summer (DST): UTC-6 (MDT)
- ZIP code: 69153
- Area code: 308
- FIPS code: 31-35980
- GNIS feature ID: 2395305
- Website: ogallala-ne.gov

Ogallala is a city in and the county seat of Keith County, Nebraska, United States. The population was 4,878 at the 2020 census, up from 4,737 at the 2010 census. In the days of the Nebraska Territory, the city was a stop on the Pony Express and later along the transcontinental railroad. The Ogallala Formation that carries the Ogallala Aquifer was named after the city.

== History ==
Ogallala first was founded as a terminus for cattle drives that traveled from Texas to the Union Pacific railhead located there. These trails are known as the Western or Great Western trails. The Union Pacific Railroad reached Ogallala on May 24, 1867. The city itself was not laid out until 1875 and not incorporated until 1884 The town's name comes from the Oglala Sioux tribe. Rowdy cowboys made this a dangerous place to be during the cattle drive months resulting in Ogallala getting a reputation as both "The Town Too Tough For Texas" and "Gomorrah of the West".

== Geography ==
According to the United States Census Bureau, the city has a total area of 5.02 square miles (13.00 km^{2}), of which 4.96 square miles (12.85 km^{2}) is land and 0.06 square miles (0.16 km^{2}) is water. Ogallala is in the US Mountain Time Zone (UTC−7/-6).

Ogallala is close to Lake McConaughy, a large man-made lake and a state recreation area with sandy beaches, boating and swimming. The South Platte River runs through Ogallala.

=== Climate ===
Ogallala, Nebraska

Climate chart (precipitation, max. and min. temperature)
J	F	M	A	M	J	J	A	S	O	N	D
0.4 38 12	0.4 43 16	1.1 51 24	2.2 63 34	3.2 73 45	3 83 55	2.7 91 61	2.2 89 59	1.5 79 48	1 67 35	0.6 51 23	0.5 41 15
- █ Average max. and min. temperatures in °F
- █ Precipitation totals in inches
Metric conversion
J	F	M	A	M	J	J	A	S	O	N	D
10 3 −11	10 6 −9	28 11 −4	56 17 1	81 23 7	76 28 13	69 33 16	56 32 15	38 26 9	25 19 2	15 11 −5	13 5 −9
- █ Average max. and min. temperatures in °C
- █ Precipitation totals in mm

Ogallala has a dry humid subtropical climate (Köppen Cfa) using the 26.6 °F or −3 °C boundary, or a humid continental climate (Dfa) under the 32 °F or 0 °C boundary. In either case it is close to being classified as a cool semi-arid climate (Köppen BSk), with an annual average precipitation of 19.54 in (496 mm). Winters are cold but extremely variable due to conflicts between very warm chinook winds and frigid Arctic outbreaks: February 1954 had a mean maximum of 59.5 °F or 15.3 °C, whereas January 1979 had a mean minimum of −4.8 °F or −20.4 °C and February 1936 a mean low of −1.0 °F or −18.3 °C. On average thirteen mornings fall below 0 °F (−17.8 °C) during an average window from December 15 to February 16, although forty-five mornings reached this temperature in 1978–79 but none at all in 1999–2000. Summers are hot and often stormy: 45 afternoons on average reach 90 °F or 32.2 °C and five reach 100 °F (37.8 °C).

Precipitation is greatest in the late spring and summer, with winter being the driest part of the year. The wettest calendar year has been 1915 with 38.77 inches or 984.8 millimeters and the driest 2022 with 6.13 inches or 155.7 millimeters. The wettest month has been July 2002 with 8.95 inches or 227.3 millimeters. The snowiest month has been March 1980 with 30.5 inches or 0.77 meters; in contrast, the entire season from July 2025 to June 2026 saw just 5.0 inches or 0.13 meters of snow.

Climate data for Ogallala, Nebraska (1991–2020 normals, extremes 1893–present)
Month	Jan	Feb	Mar	Apr	May	Jun	Jul	Aug	Sep	Oct	Nov	Dec	Year
Record high °F (°C)	74 (23)	78 (26)	92 (33)	95 (35)	100 (38)	108 (42)	115 (46)	109 (43)	109 (43)	95 (35)	82 (28)	77 (25)	115 (46)
Mean maximum °F (°C)	61.2 (16.2)	66.7 (19.3)	77.7 (25.4)	85.0 (29.4)	92.7 (33.7)	98.6 (37.0)	101.9 (38.8)	99.2 (37.3)	96.0 (35.6)	87.0 (30.6)	73.4 (23.0)	63.0 (17.2)	102.8 (39.3)
Mean daily maximum °F (°C)	39.7 (4.3)	42.8 (6.0)	53.4 (11.9)	61.9 (16.6)	71.8 (22.1)	83.4 (28.6)	89.6 (32.0)	87.4 (30.8)	79.2 (26.2)	65.0 (18.3)	51.4 (10.8)	41.1 (5.1)	63.9 (17.7)
Daily mean °F (°C)	27.5 (−2.5)	30.3 (−0.9)	39.6 (4.2)	48.2 (9.0)	58.7 (14.8)	70.0 (21.1)	76.2 (24.6)	74.1 (23.4)	64.8 (18.2)	50.7 (10.4)	38.1 (3.4)	28.8 (−1.8)	50.6 (10.3)
Mean daily minimum °F (°C)	15.4 (−9.2)	17.7 (−7.9)	25.7 (−3.5)	34.5 (1.4)	45.6 (7.6)	56.6 (13.7)	62.9 (17.2)	60.8 (16.0)	50.4 (10.2)	36.4 (2.4)	24.7 (−4.1)	16.4 (−8.7)	37.3 (2.9)
Mean minimum °F (°C)	−5.4 (−20.8)	−1.9 (−18.8)	8.2 (−13.2)	20.6 (−6.3)	30.8 (−0.7)	45.2 (7.3)	53.6 (12.0)	50.6 (10.3)	36.5 (2.5)	19.2 (−7.1)	7.6 (−13.6)	−2.1 (−18.9)	−11.2 (−24.0)
Record low °F (°C)	−29 (−34)	−26 (−32)	−23 (−31)	−2 (−19)	19 (−7)	32 (0)	38 (3)	37 (3)	15 (−9)	−2 (−19)	−10 (−23)	−36 (−38)	−36 (−38)
Average precipitation inches (mm)	0.51 (13)	0.58 (15)	1.12 (28)	2.23 (57)	3.22 (82)	3.11 (79)	2.90 (74)	2.09 (53)	1.53 (39)	1.26 (32)	0.59 (15)	0.40 (10)	19.54 (496)
Average snowfall inches (cm)	4.6 (12)	5.6 (14)	3.7 (9.4)	3.2 (8.1)	0.2 (0.51)	0.0 (0.0)	0.0 (0.0)	0.0 (0.0)	0.0 (0.0)	0.6 (1.5)	2.6 (6.6)	4.1 (10)	24.6 (62)
Average precipitation days (≥ 0.01 in)	2.8	4.0	5.4	7.8	10.5	9.5	8.3	7.0	5.3	5.6	3.5	2.8	72.5
Average snowy days (≥ 0.1 in)	2.9	4.0	2.5	1.7	0.1	0.0	0.0	0.0	0.0	0.6	1.7	2.6	16.1
Source: NOAA

== Demographics ==
Historical population
Census	Pop.	Note	%±
1880	114		—
1890	494		333.3%
1900	355		−28.1%
1910	643		81.1%
1920	1,062		65.2%
1930	1,631		53.6%
1940	3,159		93.7%
1950	3,456		9.4%
1960	4,250		23.0%
1970	4,976		17.1%
1980	5,638		13.3%
1990	5,095		−9.6%
2000	4,930		−3.2%
2010	4,737		−3.9%
2020	4,878		3.0%
U.S. Decennial Census; 2012 Estimate

=== 2020 census ===
As of the 2020 census, Ogallala had a population of 4,878. The median age was 42.0 years. 24.1% of residents were under the age of 18 and 22.0% of residents were 65 years of age or older. For every 100 females there were 95.6 males, and for every 100 females age 18 and over there were 92.0 males age 18 and over.

95.9% of residents lived in urban areas, while 4.1% lived in rural areas.

There were 2,123 households in Ogallala, including 1,082 family households. Of these households, 27.3% had children under the age of 18 living in them. Of all households, 45.2% were married-couple households, 20.3% were households with a male householder and no spouse or partner present, and 27.6% were households with a female householder and no spouse or partner present. About 35.3% of all households were made up of individuals and 17.2% had someone living alone who was 65 years of age or older.

There were 2,492 housing units, of which 14.8% were vacant. The homeowner vacancy rate was 2.1% and the rental vacancy rate was 13.6%.

Racial composition as of the 2020 census
Race	Number	Percent
White	4,313	88.4%
Black or African American	18	0.4%
American Indian and Alaska Native	23	0.5%
Asian	27	0.6%
Native Hawaiian and Other Pacific Islander	5	0.1%
Some other race	189	3.9%
Two or more races	303	6.2%
Hispanic or Latino (of any race)	566	11.6%

=== Income and poverty ===
The 2016–2020 5-year American Community Survey estimates show that the median household income was $45,508 (with a margin of error of +/- $8,969) and the median family income $61,422 (+/- $6,719). Males had a median income of $37,220 (+/- $7,286) versus $26,419 (+/- $2,208) for females. The median income for those above 16 years old was $31,090 (+/- $3,246). Approximately, 12.1% of families and 20.7% of the population were below the poverty line, including 24.5% of those under the age of 18 and 23.2% of those ages 65 or over.

=== 2010 census ===
As of the census of 2010, there were 4,737 people, 2,100 households, and 1,298 families living in the city. The population density was 955.0 inhabitants per square mile (368.7/km^{2}). There were 2,397 housing units at an average density of 483.3 per square mile (186.6/km^{2}). The racial makeup of the city was 94.6% White, 0.2% African American, 0.6% Native American, 0.4% Asian, 2.2% from other races, and 2.0% from two or more races. Hispanic or Latino of any race were 7.5% of the population.

There were 2,100 households, of which 27.5% had children under the age of 18 living with them, 48.0% were married couples living together, 9.6% had a female householder with no husband present, 4.2% had a male householder with no wife present, and 38.2% were non-families. 34.1% of all households were made up of individuals, and 14.6% had someone living alone who was 65 years of age or older. The average household size was 2.23 and the average family size was 2.85.

The median age in the city was 43.7 years. 23.6% of residents were under the age of 18; 6.8% were between the ages of 18 and 24; 21.4% were from 25 to 44; 28.3% were from 45 to 64; and 20.1% were 65 years of age or older. The gender makeup of the city was 48.8% male and 51.2% female.

=== 2000 census ===
As of the census of 2000, there were 4,930 people, 2,052 households, and 1,339 families living in the city. The population density was 1,472.4 inhabitants per square mile (568.5/km^{2}). There were 2,314 housing units at an average density of 691.1 per square mile (266.8/km^{2}). The racial makeup of the city was 96.45% White, 0.02% African American, 0.87% Native American, 0.22% Asian, 1.68% from other races, and 0.75% from two or more races. Hispanic or Latino of any race were 4.79% of the population.

There were 2,052 households, out of which 31.5% had children under the age of 18 living with them, 53.0% were married couples living together, 9.5% had a female householder with no husband present, and 34.7% were non-families. 30.7% of all households were made up of individuals, and 14.7% had someone living alone who was 65 years of age or older. The average household size was 2.35 and the average family size was 2.94.

In the city, the population was spread out, with 26.5% under the age of 18, 6.7% from 18 to 24, 26.5% from 25 to 44, 21.9% from 45 to 64, and 18.4% who were 65 years of age or older. The median age was 39 years. For every 100 females, there were 89.0 males. For every 100 females age 18 and over, there were 85.0 males.

As of 2000 the median income for a household in the city was $32,141, and the median income for a family was $39,688. Males had a median income of $27,436 versus $18,292 for females. The per capita income for the city was $17,674. About 5.0% of families and 7.8% of the population were below the poverty line, including 9.3% of those under age 18 and 9.1% of those age 65 or over.

== Arts and culture ==
=== Point of interest ===
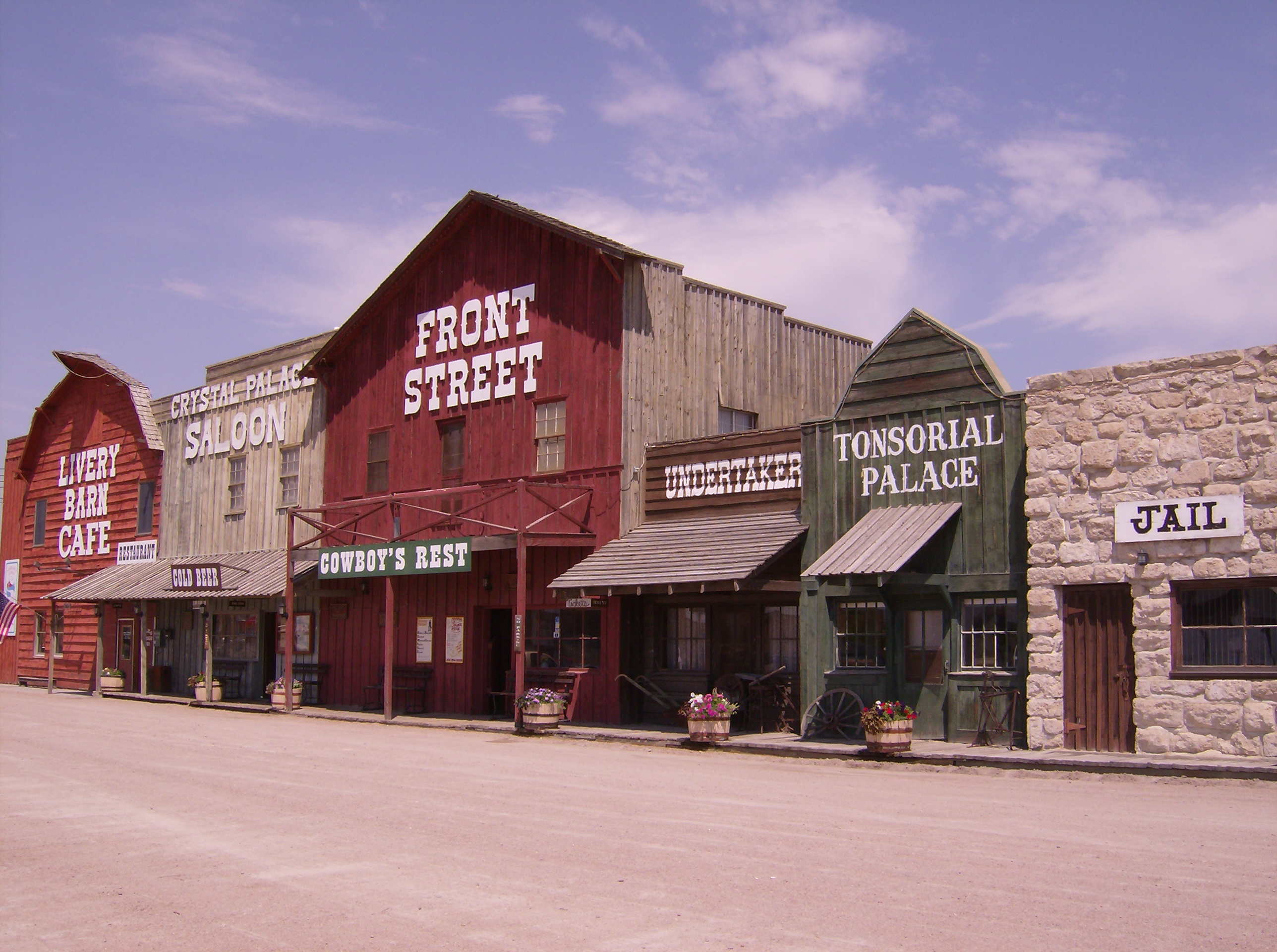
Front Street tourist attraction

The Ogallala post office contains an oil-on-canvas mural, titled Long Horns, painted in 1938 by Frank Mechau. Murals were produced from 1934 to 1943 in the United States through the Section of Painting and Sculpture, later called the Section of Fine Arts, of the Treasury Department.

== Education ==
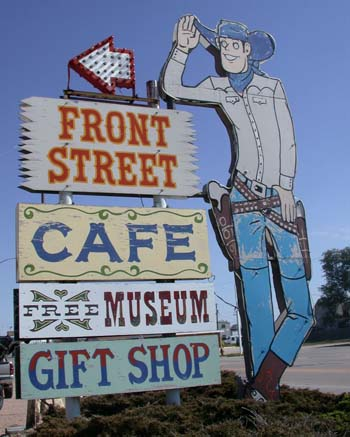
Sign for "Front Street" a popular Old West-themed tourist attraction in Ogallala

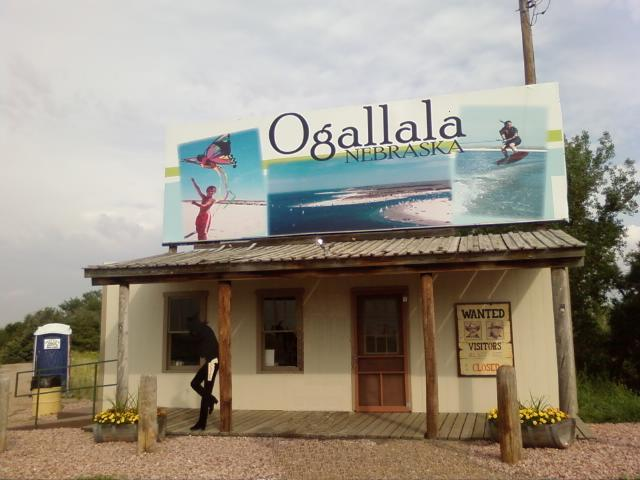
Photo spot just off Interstate 80

=== Public schools ===
Ogallala is served by the Ogallala Public School District

- High School—Ogallala High School
- Elementary and Middle School—Prairie View School (grade PK-8)

=== Private schools ===
- St. Paul's Lutheran School (PreK-5)
- St. Luke's Catholic School (PreK-5)

== Media ==
=== Radio ===
- KOGA (AM) (930 AM) Adult Standards/MOR
- KOGA-FM (99.7 FM) Classic Rock
- KMCX (106.5 FM) Hot Country

=== Newspaper ===
- Keith County News (bi-weekly)

== Infrastructure ==
=== Transportation ===
Intercity bus service to the city is provided by Burlington Trailways and Express Arrow. Within the city, Ogallala Public Transit provides dial-a-ride service.

== Notable people ==
- John Lanigan – longtime morning radio host at WMJI in Cleveland; National Radio Hall of Fame inductee
- Ken Schilz – Nebraska state senator
- Thomas Shanahan – United States federal judge

== In popular culture ==
The 1985 novel Lonesome Dove is partially set in Ogallala, as is the 1989 Lonesome Dove miniseries.
