= Mass media in North Platte, Nebraska =

North Platte, Nebraska is a center of media in west-central Nebraska

North Platte, Nebraska is a center of media in west-central Nebraska. The following is a list of media outlets in the city.

== Print ==
=== Newspapers ===
The North Platte Telegraph is the city's primary newspaper, published six days a week and owned by Lee Enterprises. In addition, Flatrock Publishing publishes a weekly alternative newspaper, the North Platte Bulletin.

== Radio ==
The following is a list of radio stations licensed to and/or broadcasting from North Platte:

=== AM ===
- 880 KRVN Lexington (Full-service/agricultural/classic country)
- 970 KJLT North Platte (Christian radio)
- 1240 KODY North Platte (Talk/sports)
- 1410 KOOQ North Platte (Classic hits)

=== FM ===
- 89.3 KJTF North Platte (Southern gospel)*
- 90.1 KFJS North Platte (Christian radio)*
- 91.7 KPNE-FM North Platte (NPR; satellite of KUCV, Lincoln)*
- 93.5 KZTL Paxton (Country)
- 94.3 KROA North Platte (Christian contemporary)
- 94.9 KJLT-FM North Platte (Christian contemporary)
- 97.1 KELN North Platte (Hot adult contemporary)
- 98.5 KHAQ Maxwell (Classic rock)
- 99.7 KOGA-FM Ogallala (Variety hits)
- 100.7 KRNP Sutherland (Active rock)
- 103.5 KXNP North Platte (Country)
- 106.5 KMCX Ogallala (Country)
- 107.3 KNPQ Hershey (Country)

== Television ==
North Platte is the principal city of the North Platte television market which includes three counties in west-central Nebraska: Lincoln County, Logan County, and McPherson County.

The following is a list of television stations that broadcast from and/or are licensed to the city.

- 2 KNOP-TV North Platte (NBC)
- 9 KPNE-TV North Platte (PBS, satellite of KUON, Lincoln)
- 10 KNPL-LD North Platte (CBS; MyNetworkTV on LD2)
- 11 KIIT-CD North Platte (Fox)
- 27 KHGI-CD North Platte (ABC/NTV)
- 30 KMBB-LD North Platte (Hope Channel, 3ABN on LD2)
- 49 K49LK-D North Platte (Independent religious)
- 50 K50JI North Platte (Independent religious)
