= Mass media in Grand Island, Nebraska =

Grand Island, Nebraska is a center of media in south-central Nebraska. The following is a list of media outlets in the city.

== Print ==
=== Newspapers ===
The Grand Island Independent is the city's primary newspaper, published daily. Other newspapers published in Grand Island include:

- Buenos Dias Nebraska, Spanish language paper, twice monthly
- West Nebraska Register, published by the Roman Catholic Diocese of Grand Island, twice monthly

== Radio ==
In its fall 2013 ranking of radio markets by population, Arbitron ranked the Grand Island-Kearney-Hastings market 251st in the United States.

The following is a list of radio stations licensed to and/or broadcasting from Grand Island:

=== AM ===
Frequency	Callsign	Format	City of license	Notes
750	KMMJ	Religious	Grand Island, Nebraska	Broadcasts from O'Neill, Nebraska
1430	KRGI	News/Talk	Grand Island, Nebraska	-

=== FM ===
Frequency	Callsign	Format	City of license	Notes
88.3	KLNB	Christian Contemporary	Grand Island, Nebraska	K-LOVE
89.7	K209CX	Religious	Grand Island, Nebraska	Translator of WPCS, Pensacola, Florida
90.3	K212GG	Religious	Grand Island, Nebraska	Translator of WYFQ, Charlotte, North Carolina
90.7	KNFA	Religious	Grand Island, Nebraska	-
91.5	KJWM	Religious	Grand Island, Nebraska	-
93.3	K227BQ	Spanish	Grand Island, Nebraska	-
95.7	KROA	Christian Contemporary	Grand Island, Nebraska	-
96.5	KRGI-FM	Country	Grand Island, Nebraska	-
97.3	KRGY	Classic rock	Aurora, Nebraska	Broadcasts from Grand Island
101.5	KROR	Classic rock	Hastings, Nebraska	Broadcasts from Grand Island
103.1	KKJK	Top 40	Ravenna, Nebraska	Broadcasts from Grand Island
103.5	K278BR	Religious	Grand Island, Nebraska	BRN; Translator of KCVN, Lexington, Nebraska
107.7	KSYZ-FM	Adult Hits	Grand Island, Nebraska	-

== Television ==
Grand Island lies within the Lincoln-Hastings-Kearney television market.

The following is a list of television stations that broadcast from and/or are licensed to the city.

Display channel	Network	Callsign	City of license	Notes
11.1	CBS	KGIN	Grand Island, Nebraska	Satellite station of KOLN, Lincoln, Nebraska
11.2	NBC	KGIN	Grand Island, Nebraska	Simulcast of KSNB-TV, Hastings, Nebraska
