= KFNF =

- Oberlin, Kansas; United States
- Frequency: 101.1 MHz
- Branding: Today's Best Country

Programming
- Format: Country

Ownership
- Owner: Armada Media Corporation; (Armada Media - McCook, Inc.)
- Sister stations: KHAQ, KXNP, KODY, KMTY, KUVR, KADL, KICX-FM, KQHK, KBRL, KFNF, KSTH, KJBL

History
- First air date: August 17, 1977

Technical information
- Licensing authority: FCC
- Class: C1
- ERP: 100,000 watts
- HAAT: 135 meters (443 feet)
- Transmitter coordinates: 39°49′38″N 100°38′50″W

Links
- Public license information: Public file; LMS
- Website: www.highplainsradio.net/kfnf-10-1/

KFNF (101.1 FM, "Today's Best Country") is a radio station licensed to serve Oberlin, Kansas.The station is owned by Armada Media Corporation and licensed to Armada Media - McCook, Inc. It airs a Country format.
