= KADL =

Radio station in Imperial, Nebraska, United States

- Imperial, Nebraska; United States
- Frequency: 102.9 MHz
- Branding: Kool 102.9

Programming
- Format: Classic hits
- Affiliations: ABC Radio

Ownership
- Owner: Armada Media - McCook, Inc.
- Sister stations: KHAQ, KXNP, KODY, KMTY, KUVR, KICX-FM, KQHK, KBRL, KFNF, KSTH, KJBL

History
- Former call signs: KURK (2001–2003); KJBL (2003–2003); KLHK (2003–2003)

Technical information
- Licensing authority: FCC
- Facility ID: 88537
- Class: A
- ERP: 300 watts
- HAAT: 68 meters (223 ft)
- Transmitter coordinates: 40°30′45″N 101°38′39″W

Links
- Public license information: Public file; LMS
- Webcast: Listen Live
- Website: KADL Online

KADL (102.9 FM) is a radio station broadcasting a classic hits format that is licensed to Imperial, Nebraska, United States. The station is owned by Armada Media - McCook, Inc. and features programming from ABC Radio.

== History ==
The station was assigned the call letters KURK on July 2, 2001. On April 14, 2003, the station changed its call sign to KJBL, on May 7, 2003 to KLHK, and on June 30, 2003 to KADL.

Former logo

== Construction permit ==
On May 27, 2010 KADL was granted a U.S. Federal Communications Commission construction permit to increase ERP to 100,000 watts. The permit will expire on May 27, 2013.
