= KQHK =

- McCook, Nebraska; United States
- Frequency: 103.9 MHz
- Branding: 103.9 The Hawk

Programming
- Format: Classic rock
- Affiliations: Premiere Radio Networks, Westwood One

Ownership
- Owner: Armada Media; (Armada Media - Mccook)
- Sister stations: KHAQ, KXNP, KODY, KMTY, KUVR, KADL, KICX, KBRL, KFNF, KSTH, KJBL

History
- First air date: 2008

Technical information
- Licensing authority: FCC
- Facility ID: 166033
- Class: C2
- ERP: 50,000 watts
- HAAT: 113 meters (371 ft)
- Transmitter coordinates: 40°10′19″N 100°41′5″W

Links
- Public license information: Public file; LMS
- Webcast: Listen Live
- Website: www.highplainsradio.net/hawk-103-9/

KQHK (103.9 FM, "103.9 The Hawk") is a radio station broadcasting a classic rock music format. Licensed to McCook, Nebraska, United States, the station is currently owned by Armada Media.
