= KICX-FM =

Radio station in McCook, Nebraska

- McCook, Nebraska; United States
- Frequency: 96.1 MHz
- Branding: 96.1 KICX

Programming
- Format: Adult contemporary

Ownership
- Owner: Armada Media; (Armada Media - Mccook)
- Sister stations: KHAQ, KXNP, KODY, KMTY, KUVR, KADL, KQHK, KBRL, KFNF, KSTH, KJBL

History
- First air date: 1974

Technical information
- Licensing authority: FCC
- Facility ID: 57517
- Class: C1
- ERP: 55,000 watts
- HAAT: 90 meters
- Transmitter coordinates: 40°10′17″N 100°41′4″W

Links
- Public license information: Public file; LMS
- Webcast: Listen Live
- Website: KICX-FM Online

KICX-FM (96.1 MHz) is a radio station broadcasting an adult contemporary music format. Licensed to McCook, Nebraska, United States, the station is currently owned by Armada Media.
