= KJBL =

- Julesburg, Colorado; United States
- Broadcast area: Northeastern Colorado and Panhandle area of Nebraska
- Frequency: 96.5 MHz

Programming
- Format: Classic hits

Ownership
- Owner: Armada Media - Mccook
- Sister stations: KHAQ, KXNP, KODY, KMTY, KUVR, KADL, KICX, KQHK, KBRL, KFNF, KSTH,

History
- First air date: February 2, 1999 (as KEGK)
- Former call signs: KEGK (1999–2001); KKAS (2001–2004); KKYT (2004–2005)

Technical information
- Licensing authority: FCC
- Facility ID: 84864
- Class: A
- ERP: 265 watts
- HAAT: -32.4 meters
- Transmitter coordinates: 40°59′18″N 102°15′44″W

Links
- Public license information: Public file; LMS
- Webcast: Listen Live
- Website: highplainsradio.net/kjbl-96-5

KJBL (96.5 FM) is a radio station licensed to Julesburg, Colorado, United States. The station is owned by Armada Media - Mccook.

Along with carrying classic hits, the station airs local high school football games. The station carries local news as well. Music on KJBL is primarily satellite fed.

== History ==
The station was assigned the call letters KEGK on February 26, 1999. On July 24, 2001, the station changed its call sign to KKAS and on July 7, 2004, to KKYT. After a period off air, on January 14, 2005, the station became the current KJBL. Beginning in 2005, the station aired primarily a country music format, however this soon was changed to classic hits.
