= KSTH =

- Holyoke, Colorado; United States
- Frequency: 92.3 MHz
- Branding: Star 92.3

Programming
- Format: Adult contemporary

Ownership
- Owner: Armada Media - Mccook
- Sister stations: KHAQ, KXNP, KODY, KMTY, KUVR, KADL, KICX-FM, KQHK, KBRL, KFNF, KJBL

History
- Former call signs: KKYT (1999–2004)

Technical information
- Licensing authority: FCC
- Facility ID: 85760
- Class: C2
- ERP: 35,000 watts
- HAAT: 64 meters
- Transmitter coordinates: 40°34′46″N 102°19′11″W

Links
- Public license information: Public file; LMS
- Webcast: Listen Live
- Website: Star 92.3 Online

KSTH (92.3 FM) is a radio station licensed to Holyoke, Colorado, United States. The station is owned by Armada Media - Mccook. The station has a construction permit from the U.S. Federal Communications Commission (FCC) to increase of effective radiated power to 35,000 watts.

== History ==
The station was assigned the call letters KKYT on August 1, 1999. On July 7, 2004, the station changed its call sign to KSTH.
