= KBRL =

- McCook, Nebraska; United States
- Frequency: 1300 kHz
- Branding: The BIG Talker

Programming
- Format: News/Talk
- Affiliations: ABC Radio, Premiere Radio Networks

Ownership
- Owner: Armada Media; (Armada Media - Mccook, Inc.)
- Sister stations: KHAQ, KXNP, KODY, KMTY, KUVR, KADL, KICX, KQHK, KBRL, KFNF, KSTH, KJBL

History
- First air date: 1946
- Former call signs: KSWN (1982–1990)

Technical information
- Licensing authority: FCC
- Facility ID: 57516
- Class: D
- Power: 5,000 watts day 136 watts night
- Transmitter coordinates: 40°11′31″N 100°39′7.5″W

Links
- Public license information: Public file; LMS
- Webcast: Listen Live
- Website: www.highplainsradio.net/kbrl-1300/

KBRL (1300 AM) is a radio station broadcasting a news/talk format. Licensed to McCook, Nebraska, United States, the station is currently owned by Armada Media.

== History ==
The station went on the air on Sept. 26, 1947 as KBRL, a radio station built by Roy Lenwell and William J. Cox. Lenwell retired and sold the station to Edwin S Towell III from Falls City, Nebraska in 1972. The Santee Family purchased the station in January 1977. The station became a country station in 1977 and was sold to Jerry Venable and his bunch from KFNF in September 1981, and changed the call sign to KSWN on 1982-10-11. On 1990-04-03, the station changed its call sign back to the current KBRL.
