= KIMB (AM) =

Kimball, Nebraska; United States
- Frequency: 1260 kHz

Programming
- Format: Defunct

Ownership
- Owner: Victor A. Michael, Jr.; (Laramie Mountain Broadcasting, L.L.C.)

History
- First air date: 1959
- Last air date: March 21, 2014
- Call sign meaning: KIMBall

Technical information
- Facility ID: 15818
- Class: D
- Power: 1,000 watts day 112 watts night
- Transmitter coordinates: 41°15′42″N 103°40′6″W

KIMB (1260 AM) was a radio station licensed to Kimball, Nebraska, United States. The station was last owned by Victor A. Michael, Jr., through licensee Laramie Mountain Broadcasting, L.L.C.

== History ==
KIMB was first licensed by the Federal Communications Commission (FCC) on June 9, 1959.

The FCC granted a license to cover assignment to KIMB Inc. on May 10, 1977. The license was later assigned to David S. Young, who in turn assigned it to G & L Investments, LLC on January 7, 2002, for $65,000. G & L assigned the license on a pro forma basis to Steckline Communications, L.L.C. on December 31, 2003, in exchange for a parcel of land. Steckline assigned the license to Legacy Communications, LLC on May 17, 2004, for $4.75 million — also included in the transaction were the licenses for KMMJ, KRGI, KRGI-FM, and KRGY. Legacy assigned the licenses for KIMB and KBFZ to Kimball Radio, LLC on April 4, 2007. On July 18, 2008, Kimball assigned the license to Sterling Radio, LLC for $50,000. Sterling assigned the license to Main Street Communications, LLC, on March 19, 2009. Main Street assigned the license to Victor A. Michael, Jr.'s Laramie Mountain Broadcasting, L.L.C. on September 13, 2012, in exchange for forgiveness of a $100,000 debt owed by Main Street.

On March 24, 2015, KIMB's license was deleted by the FCC at the request of Laramie Mountain Broadcasting. In the request (which had been made on March 23), the station said it ceased operations on March 21, 2014, due to technical problems, and had not resumed broadcasting within a year.
