= KODY =

- North Platte, Nebraska; United States
- Broadcast area: North Platte
- Frequency: 1240 kHz
- Branding: Newstalk 1240 - 106.1

Programming
- Format: News Talk Information
- Affiliations: Premiere Radio Networks, Talk Radio Network

Ownership
- Owner: Armada Media - McCook, LLC
- Sister stations: KHAQ, KXNP, KMTY, KUVR, KADL, KICX, KQHK, KBRL, KFNF, KSTH, KJBL

Technical information
- Licensing authority: FCC
- Facility ID: AM:9931; FM:144566
- Class: AM:C; FM:D
- Power: 1,000 watts unlimited
- Transmitter coordinates: 41°9′14.00″N 100°46′23.00″W
- Translators: (92.5 MHz) K223CQ (North Platte); 106.1 MHz (K291BW - North Platte)

Links
- Public license information: Public file; FM:144566 LMS
- Webcast: KODY listen online
- Website: www.huskeradio.com

KODY (1240 AM) is a radio station broadcasting a News Talk Information format. Licensed to North Platte, Nebraska, United States, the station serves the North Platte area. The station is currently owned by Armada Media - McCook, LLC and features programming from Premiere Radio Networks and Talk Radio Network.

KODY is also a Nebraska Cornhuskers affiliate, along with being the exclusive home for North Platte Saint Patrick's athletics.
