= KRNP =

- Sutherland, Nebraska; United States
- Broadcast area: North Platte, Nebraska; Ogallala, Nebraska
- Frequency: 100.7 MHz
- Branding: Flat Rock 100.7

Programming
- Format: Classic rock

Ownership
- Owner: Eagle Communications, Inc.
- Sister stations: KELN, KOOQ, KNPQ, KZTL

History
- First air date: 2007
- Call sign meaning: K Rock North Platte

Technical information
- Licensing authority: FCC
- Facility ID: 164139
- Class: C1
- ERP: 100,000 watts
- HAAT: 229.6 meters (753 ft)
- Transmitter coordinates: 41°3′50.0″N 101°20′16.0″W

Links
- Public license information: Public file; LMS

For the airport with the ICAO code KRNP, see Owosso Community Airport

KRNP (100.7 FM) is a classic rock formatted broadcast radio station licensed to Sutherland, Nebraska, serving the North Platte/Ogallala area. KRNP is owned and operated by Eagle Communications, Inc.

On October 20, 2020, KRNP changed their format from active rock to classic rock, branded as "Flat Rock 100.7".
