= KJLT =

KJLT may refer to:

- KJLT (AM), a radio station (970 AM) licensed to North Platte, Nebraska, United States
- KJLT-FM, a radio station (94.9 FM) licensed to North Platte, Nebraska
