= KMMJ =

- Grand Island, Nebraska; United States
- Broadcast area: Tri-Cities area
- Frequency: 750 kHz
- Branding: MyBridge Español Radio

Programming
- Language: Spanish
- Format: Christian contemporary

Ownership
- Owner: My Bridge Radio; (MyBridge)
- Sister stations: KROA, KZLW, KPNY, KHZY, KSSH, KQIQ, KMBV, KRKR

History
- First air date: November 30, 1925
- Call sign meaning: K M.M. Johnson Co. (original owner)

Technical information
- Licensing authority: FCC
- Facility ID: 9937
- Class: B
- Power: 10,500 watts unlimited
- Transmitter coordinates: 41°8′5″N 97°59′38″W
- Translator: (104.7 MHz) K284DC (Grand Island)

Links
- Public license information: Public file; LMS
- Webcast: Listen Live
- Website: es.mybridgeradio.net

KMMJ (750 AM) is a radio station broadcasting a Spanish Christian contemporary format. Licensed to Grand Island, Nebraska, United States, the station serves the Grand Island, Hastings, Kearney area. The station is currently owned by My Bridge Radio. Prior to the switch to religious programming, the station broadcast a news/information format.

The station was founded in 1925 in Clay Center, Nebraska, by the M.M. Johnson Co., a manufacturer of incubators. The station was purchased and moved to Grand Island in 1938.

== Gallery ==
Previous logo with news/information format
