= KRGI =

KRGI may refer to:

- KRGI (AM), a radio station (1430 AM) licensed to Grand Island, Nebraska, United States
- KRGI-FM, a radio station (96.5 FM) licensed to Grand Island, Nebraska, United States
