= Farritor =

Farritor is a surname. Notable people with the surname include:

- Luke Farritor (born 2001/02), American software engineer
- Shane Farritor, American mechanical engineer and roboticist
