= KIMB =

KIMB may refer to:

- KIMB (FM), a radio station (104.3 FM) licensed to serve Dix, Nebraska, United States; see List of radio stations in Nebraska
- KIMB (AM), a defunct radio station (1260 AM) formerly licensed to serve Kimball, Nebraska
