= KUVR =

KUVR may refer to:

- KUVR (AM), a radio station (1380 AM) licensed to Holdrege, Nebraska, United States
- KUVR-LD, a low-power digital television station (channel 29) licensed to McCook, Nebraska, United States
