= KKJK =

- Ravenna, Nebraska; United States
- Broadcast area: Grand Island-Kearney, Nebraska
- Frequency: 103.1 MHz
- Branding: 103.1 KJ Country

Programming
- Format: Country

Ownership
- Owner: Hometown Family Radio; (Legacy Communications, LLC)
- Sister stations: KRGI, KRGI-FM, KRGY

History
- First air date: September 14, 2006

Technical information
- Licensing authority: FCC
- Facility ID: 164157
- Class: C1
- ERP: 100,000 watts
- HAAT: 195 meters (640 ft)
- Transmitter coordinates: 40°48′57.00″N 98°46′18.00″W

Links
- Public license information: Public file; LMS
- Webcast: Listen Live
- Website: 1031kjcountry.com

KKJK (103.1 FM, "103.1 KJ Country") is a country music radio station licensed to serve the community of Ravenna, Nebraska. The station's broadcast license is held by Legacy Communications, LLC. KKJK is operated as part of Hometown Family Radio along with sister stations KRGI, KRGI-FM, and KRGY.

== Programming ==
Since June 20, 2012, the station has broadcasts a contemporary hit radio music format branded as "2Day FM 103.1" to the Grand Island-Kearney-Hastings, area. Syndicated programming includes AT40 with Ryan Seacrest on Saturday mornings and Jackson Blue weeknights. The station aired Hollywood Hamilton's Weekend Top 30 and the Zach Sang Show until both shows ended their broadcast.

From the station's launch in 2006 until that change, KKJK aired an active rock music format branded as "Thunder 103.1".

== History ==
In December 2004, Community Radio, Inc., applied to the Federal Communications Commission (FCC) for a construction permit for a new broadcast radio station to serve Ravenna, Nebraska. The FCC granted this permit on February 25, 2005, with a scheduled expiration date of February 25, 2008. The new station was assigned call sign "KKJK" on April 26, 2005. After construction and testing were completed in June 2006, the station was granted its broadcast license on September 14, 2006.

In October 2009, Legacy Communications, LLC, executed a February 2006 option to purchase the station's broadcast license and other assets from Community Radio, Inc., for $1,150,000. The FCC approved the application to transfer the license on January 8, 2010, and the sale was consummated on March 1, 2010.

On March 23, 2026, KKJK changed their format from Top 40/CHR to country, branded as "103.1 KJ Country".

== Previous logos ==
Thunder branding (2006-2012)

2-Day FM branding (2012-2026)
