= KRKR =

Simulcasts KROA, Grand Island, NE
- Waverly, Nebraska; United States
- Broadcast area: Lincoln metropolitan area
- Frequency: 95.1 MHz
- Branding: My Bridge Radio

Programming
- Format: Christian contemporary

Ownership
- Owner: My Bridge Radio
- Sister stations: KROA, KZLW, KPNY, KHZY, KSSH, KQIQ, KMBV, KMMJ

History
- First air date: July 1, 1983
- Former call signs: KXSS (1983–1985); KJUS (1985–1987); KLDZ (1987–1996); KNET-FM (1996–1998)
- Former frequencies: 95.3 MHz

Technical information
- Licensing authority: FCC
- Facility ID: 54707
- Class: C2
- ERP: 50,000 watts
- HAAT: 84 meters (276 ft)
- Transmitter coordinates: 40°58′49.00″N 96°41′45.00″W
- Translators: 92.7 K224DJ (La Vista); 99.3 K257GW (Springfield)

Links
- Public license information: Public file; LMS
- Webcast: Listen live
- Website: www.mybridgeradio.net

KRKR (95.1 FM) is a non-commercial radio station licensed to Waverly, Nebraska, United States, serving the Lincoln and West Omaha areas. It airs a Christian Contemporary format and is owned by My Bridge Radio. KRKR is simulcast with KROA in Grand Island, except for local information/weather inserts for the Lincoln/Omaha area, and evening programming.

KRKR has an effective radiated power (ERP) of 50,000 watts. The transmitter is off North 14th Street in Davey. KRKR is rebroadcast on La Vista FM translator 92.7 K224DJ to better serve the Omaha Metro area. It is also heard on translator 99.3 K257GW in Springfield, Nebraska.

== History ==
The station signed on as KXSS at 95.3 FM on July 1, 1983, following a stunt of playing a loop of "Kiss on My List" by Hall & Oates and "Kiss You All Over" by Exile. On June 15, 1985, the station changed its call sign to KJUS, and changed to KLDZ on March 1, 1987, along with a flip to oldies, which was later modified to all-'70s hits. On March 4, 1996, KLDZ flipped to adult album alternative as "The Net", and changed call letters to KNET-FM. On March 18, 1998, KNET-FM flipped to classic rock as KRKR, "95 Rock".

As part of Three Eagles Communications' acquisition of Clear Channel Communications' Lincoln stations in 2007, KRKR and KFRX were spun off due to ownership limits. (Three Eagles would move KFRX's Top 40/CHR format to what was KLMY, with their former 102.7 FM frequency being sold off instead, and flipped to adult contemporary in the interim.) On November 1, 2007, KRKR flipped to news/talk. On August 18, 2008, KRKR flipped to adult contemporary as "The Breeze", which moved from 102.7 FM. On May 21, 2009, KRKR went dark while Chapin Communications was seeking a buyer for the station. In August, KRKR was sold to Mission Nebraska and returned to the air, flipping to contemporary Christian music as "My Bridge Radio".
