= KXNG =

KXNG may refer to:

- KXNG (FM), a radio station (91.3 FM) licensed to serve Lexington, Nebraska, United States
- KHVU, a radio station (91.7 FM) licensed to serve Houston, Texas, United States, which held the call sign KXNG from 2016 to 2021
