= KPNY =

Simulcasts KROA, Grand Island
- Alliance, Nebraska; United States
- Frequency: 102.3 MHz
- Branding: My Bridge Radio

Programming
- Format: Religious

Ownership
- Owner: My Bridge Radio
- Sister stations: KROA, KZLW, KRKR, KHZY, KSSH, KQIQ, KMBV

History
- First air date: November 5, 1977
- Former call signs: KFAH (1977–1982); DKPNY (July 7, 2006 - February 5, 2007)
- Former frequencies: 92.1 MHz (1978–1983); 102.1 MHz (1983–2014)

Technical information
- Licensing authority: FCC
- Facility ID: 25879
- Class: C0
- ERP: 100,000 watts
- HAAT: 412 meters (1,352 ft)
- Transmitter coordinates: 41°50′28.00″N 103°4′27.00″W

Links
- Public license information: Public file; LMS
- Webcast: Listen Live
- Website: mybridgeradio.net

KPNY (102.3 FM) is a radio station broadcasting a Religious music format. Licensed to Alliance, Nebraska, United States. The station is owned by My Bridge Radio.

== History ==
The station went on the air on November 5, 1977 as KFAH. KFAH changed its call letters to KPNY on August 18, 1982. KPNY changed its frequencies to 102.1 on October 1983. KPNY was silent from July 7, 2006, to February 5, 2007. In December 2006 KPNY was sold by Halstead Communications to Mission Nebraska (My Bridge Radio), for $360,000.

== Construction permit ==
On December 5, 2012, KPNY filed an application for a U.S. Federal Communications Commission construction permit to move to 102.3 MHz and to a new transmitter site, and increase HAAT to 412 meters. On November 27, 2013, KPNY began transmitting from the upgraded facilities, and was licensed to cover at 102.3 MHz on February 19, 2014.
