= KQIQ =

My Bridge Radio station in Beatrice, Nebraska

Coordinates: 40.182°N 96.976°W

Simulcasts KROA, Grand Island
- Beatrice, Nebraska; United States
- Frequency: 88.3 MHz
- Branding: My Bridge Radio

Programming
- Format: Christian Radio

Ownership
- Owner: My Bridge Radio
- Sister stations: KROA, KZLW, KPNY, KHZY, KSSH, KRKR, KMBV

Technical information
- Licensing authority: FCC
- Facility ID: 93284
- Class: A
- ERP: 4,200 watts
- HAAT: 103 meters

Links
- Public license information: Public file; LMS
- Webcast: Listen Live
- Website: http://www.mybridgeradio.net/

KQIQ (88.3 FM) is a Christian radio station licensed to Beatrice, Nebraska, United States. The station is owned by My Bridge Radio.
