= Grand Island FCC Monitoring Station =

- U.S. National Register of Historic Places
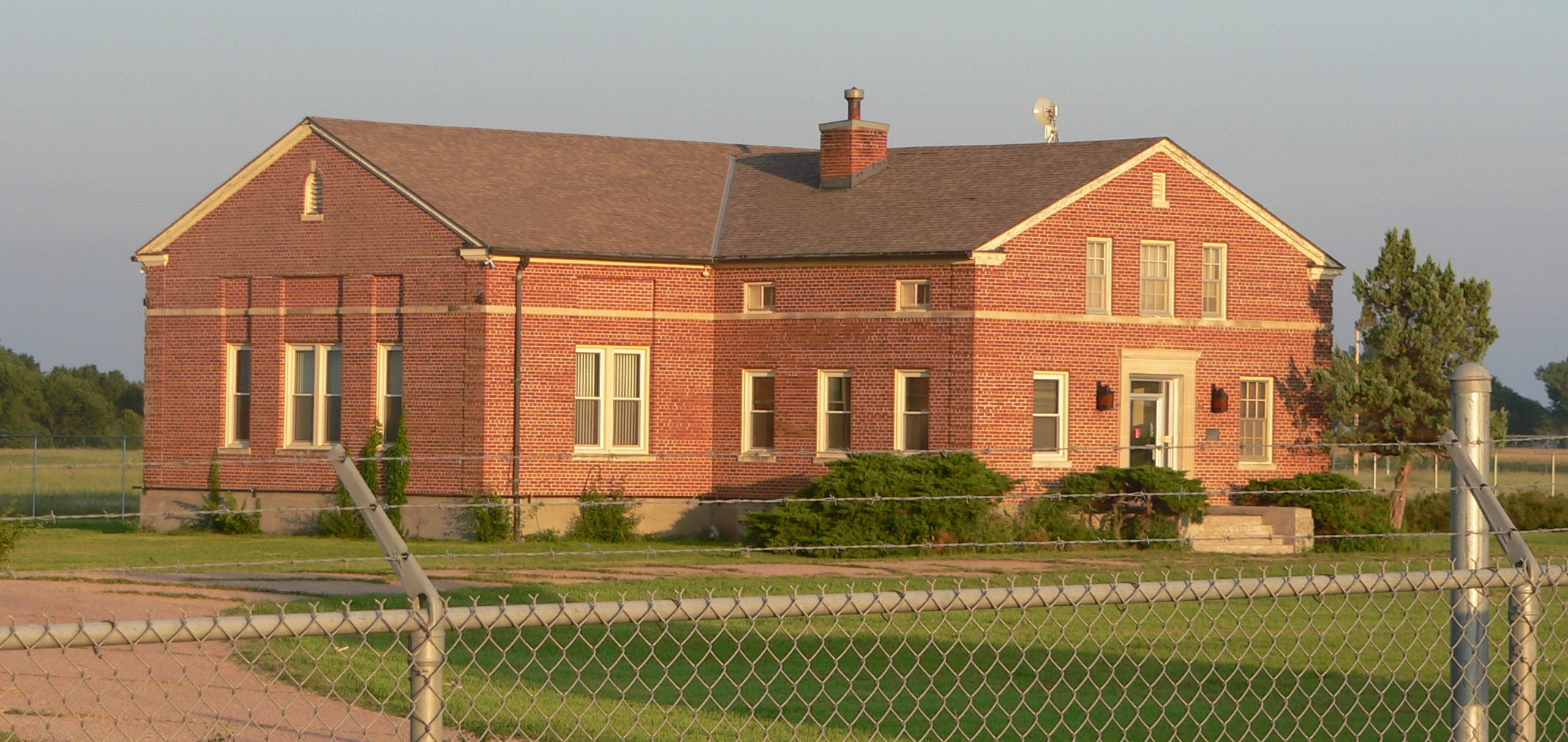
- Location: Grand Island, Nebraska
- Coordinates: 40°55′25.58″N 98°26′04.73″W
- NRHP reference No.: 73001064
- Added to NRHP: January 16th, 1973

The Grand Island FCC Monitoring Station was a federal radio monitoring station located near Grand Island, Nebraska. It was the first federal radio monitoring station built in the United States.

Operating under the Federal Radio Commission and later the Federal Communications Commission (FCC), the station provided frequency measurement services for both government and civilian sources.

== History ==
During the early days of AM radio, interference caused by unintended frequency variations was a major issue. In February 1929, funding was allocated to the Radio Division of the Department of Commerce for the construction of a constant-frequency monitoring radio station. The location of Grand Island, Nebraska was chosen due to both its proximity to the geographic center of the United States and the favorable radio conditions provided by the flat terrain.

The building plans were prepared by the Navy's Bureau of Yards and Docks and construction began in 1929. Construction was completed in 1930 and full scale operation began in 1932 under the Federal Radio Commission.

The site was transferred to the new Federal Communications Commission (FCC) by the Communications Act of 1934.

== Legacy ==
The Grand Island Monitoring Station was entered into the National Register of Historic Places on January 16, 1973. It is the first FCC property with that designation. It ceased operation in June 1996.
