= Ben Mark Cherrington =

American academic (1885-1980)

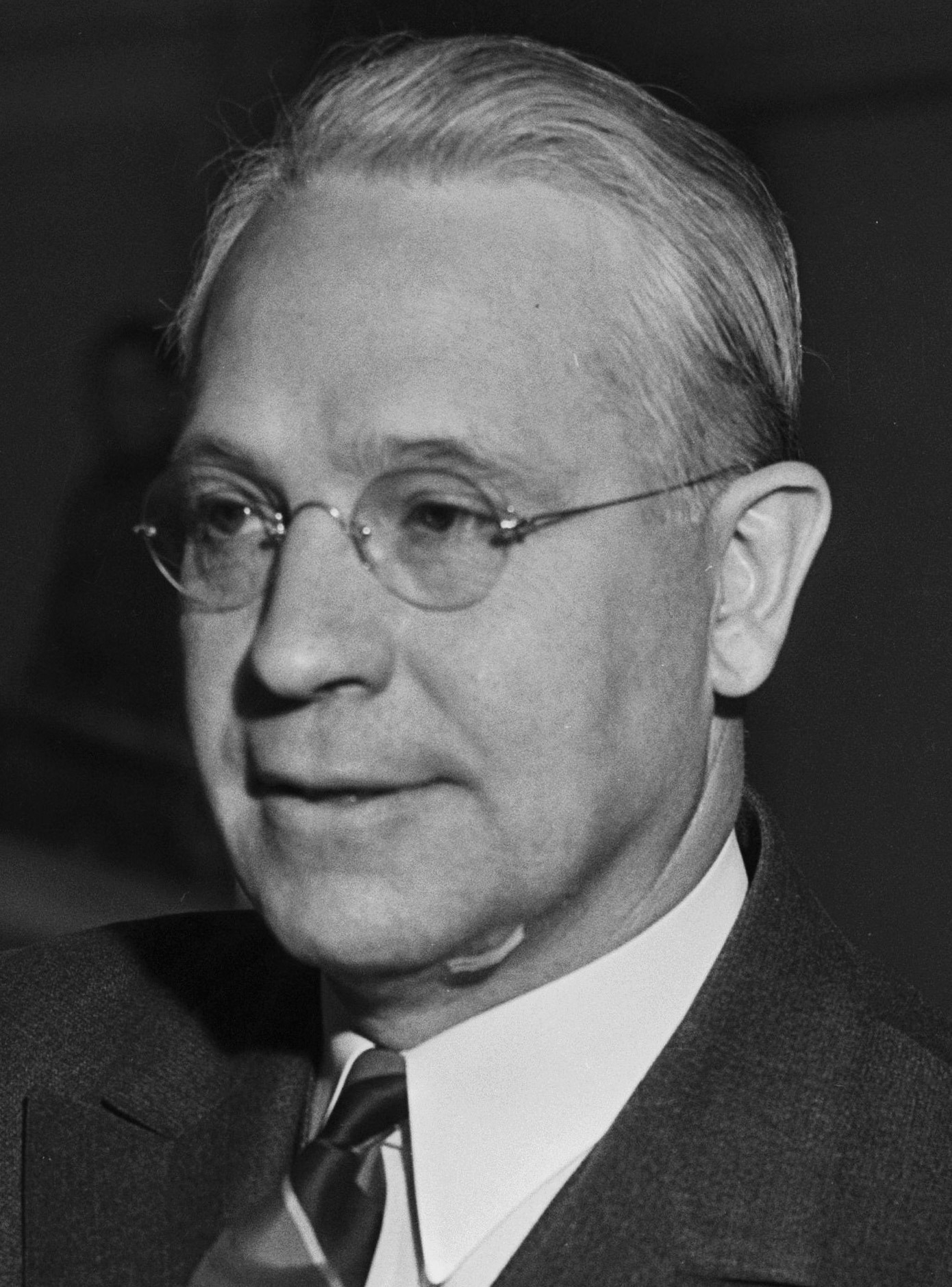
- Cherrington in 1935

Chancellor of the University of Denver
- In office October 1943 – February 1946

Personal details
- Born: November 1, 1885 Gibbon, Nebraska
- Died: May 2, 1980 (aged 94) Denver, Colorado
- Education: University of Nebraska (AM) (LLD); University of California (AM); Columbia University (PhD)

Ben Mark Cherrington (November 1, 1885 – May 2, 1980) was Acting Chancellor at the University of Denver from October 1943 to February 1946. During his term of office as chancellor he added the School of Speech and the Hotel and Restaurant Management School to the University's programs. He was the Director of the University's Social Science Foundation, which later evolved into the Graduate School of International Studies, for 25 years. Cherrington was also an author of the Charter of the United Nations and a co-founder of the United Nations Educational Scientific and Cultural Organization (UNESCO). He was honored by Queen Elizabeth in 1956 for his contributions to international affairs.

== Background ==
Cherrington was born in Gibbon, Nebraska on November 1, 1885. He graduated from the University of Nebraska in 1911. Cherrington then taught at Nebraska Wesleyan and the University of California at Berkeley. After serving in World War I, he worked at the Young Men’s Christian Association (YMCA) and became the Executive Secretary in 1919. He moved to Denver in 1918 and remained with the YMCA until he joined the faculty at the University of Denver in 1926. In 1924, he married Edith Harper and together they raised two children. Cherrington earned several academic degrees: an A.B. from the University of Nebraska, A.M. from the University of California in 1922, Ph.D. from Columbia University in 1934, and an LL.D. from the University of Nebraska College of Law in 1934.

== Career ==
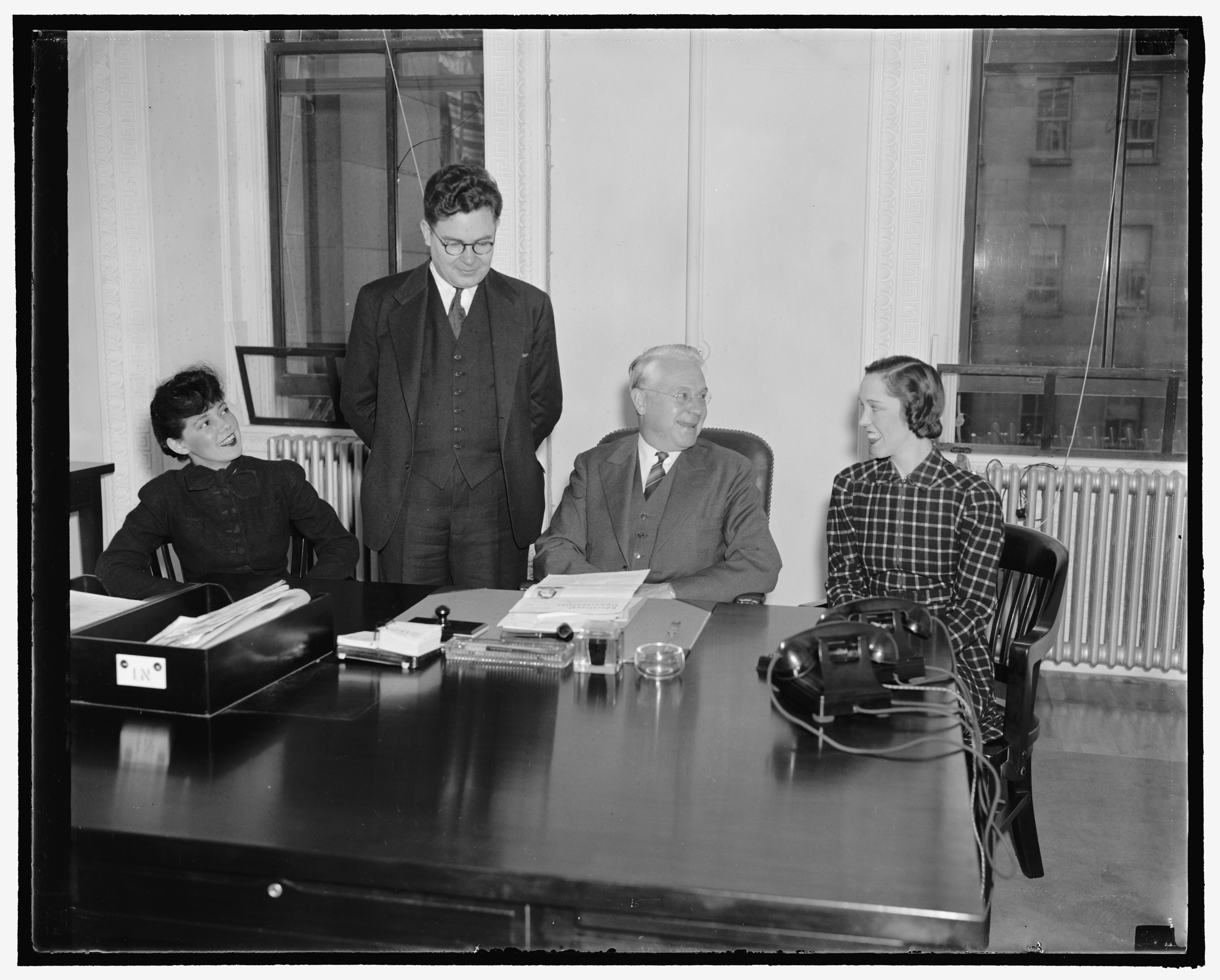
The staff of the Cultural Relations Division at the State Dept., left to right; Luz Maria Roman, Dr. Richard Pattee, Dr. Ben. Cherrington, Martha Le May in 1938.

In 1926, Cherrington became the first Director of the Social Science Foundation at the University of Denver. He held the post for 25 years. Cherrington organized many free lectures on significant problems of the day. He participated in as many as 50 lectures a year in addition to radio talks and lectures to groups geared toward making the City of Denver more “international-minded."[1] He was also Professor and the Chair of the Department of International Relations at DU. In 1943 he was appointed Chancellor of the University while Chancellor Caleb Gates was fulfilling his military service in World War II. Cherrington served in that post until 1946.

Cherrington authored a number of books, including: The British Labor Movement in the Summer of 1921 (1922), Methods of Education in International Attitudes (1934), The Nations Meet at the Ancient Crossroads of the World (1948) and Ten Studies in the Sermon on the Mount (co-author 1926). He contributed to theological, social sciences and educational journals as well. In 1934, because of his focus on international affairs DU was given a Jury Award for the FIDAC Educational Medal for distinguished service in promoting international good will and understanding. The University of Denver was recognized as the most outstanding United States institution in the university's class. Cherrington retired from his position as Director of the Social Science Foundation in 1951.

== Cherrington Hall ==
In recognition of Cherrington’s contributions to international education, the University of Denver named Cherrington Hall after him. Cherrington Hall opened in 1966. In addition to his work in education Cherrington was an author of the United Nations Charter, a co-founder of the United Nations Educational Scientific and Cultural Organization (UNESCO), an organizer of the U.S. State Department’s Bureau of Educational Affairs, and a vocal supporter of the League of Nations. In 1956, Queen Elizabeth made him an honorary member of the Order of the British Empire for his contributions to international affairs.

In 1938, Cherrington accepted the job of organizing the work of the newly created Division of Cultural Relations in the U.S. Department of State at the invitation of Secretary of State Cordell Hull and President Franklin D. Roosevelt. He also served as an adviser to the United States delegation to the eighth International Conference of American States in Lima, Peru that same year. In 1939-1940 he was the chairman of the International Relations Committee of the National Education Association of the United States. In 1940 he served as a United States delegate to the eighth American Scientific Congress . In 1945 Cherrington worked as an associate consultant for United States delegation at a United Nations Conference in San Francisco, California. He served as Director of the Rocky Mountain Institute of International Education. In February 1946 he was invited to return to the U.S. Department of State as a consultant on the establishment of UNESCO. He was appointed adviser to the United States delegation to the Third General Conference of UNESCO in Beirut, Lebanon in October 1948. He was elected by the U.S. National Commission as a member of its executive committee, and from 1952 to 1953, he served as the vice-chair.

Cherrington died in 1980 at the age of 94.
