= KZLW =

Simulcasts KROA, Grand Island, NE
- Gretna, Nebraska; United States
- Broadcast area: Greater Omaha; Wahoo, Nebraska
- Frequency: 90.1 MHz
- Branding: My Bridge Radio

Programming
- Format: Christian radio

Ownership
- Owner: My Bridge Radio; (My Bridge)
- Sister stations: KROA, KRKR, KPNY, KHZY, KSSH, KQIQ, KMBV

Technical information
- Licensing authority: FCC
- Facility ID: 175203
- Class: C1
- ERP: 100,000 watts
- HAAT: 21 meters (69 ft)
- Transmitter coordinates: 41°12′27″N 96°40′38″W

Links
- Public license information: Public file; LMS
- Website: mybridgeradio.net

KZLW (90.1 FM) is a radio station licensed to Gretna, Nebraska, United States. The station airs a format consisting of Christian talk and teaching and Christian music, and is currently owned by My Bridge Radio. The station's transmitter is located near Wahoo, Nebraska, and it serves Greater Omaha and areas to its west.

Posts from "Upper Midwest Broadcasting" at northpine.com

"My Bridge Radio Adds Station near Omaha Posted on April 30, 2019 by Jon Ellis

The Christian “My Bridge Radio” network is getting closer to Omaha with the purchase of KZLW/90.1 (Gretna) from Calvary Chapel Omaha/Maranatha Fellowship.

An asset purchase agreement filed with the FCC indicates My Bridge will pay $135,000 for KZLW, which delivers a fringe signal to Omaha with a 100 kW signal transmitting from 21 meters above average terrain from near Wahoo.

My Bridge owns seven other full-power stations in Nebraska, including KRKR/95.1 (Waverly-Lincoln), which overlaps with KZLW's coverage area.

KZLW currently carries Contemporary Christian music and Bible verses as “Living Waters Radio” from a studio at Maranatha Fellowship in Bellevue. The format is simulcast on KHLW/89.3 (Tabor, IA), which is not included in the sale."

"KZLW/90.1 (Gretna, NE) went silent July 19 while new owner My Bridge Radio looks for a new tower site. KZLW had previously transmitted with 100kW from a tower near Wahoo that is 120 feet tall, which is much shorter than towers normally used by stations with such high power."
