= Eve Ryder =

American painter

Eva C. “Eve” Ryder (1896–1984) was an artist in Nebraska known for her oil paintings of Midwest landscapes and also for still lifes. Her works were exhibited at the Joslyn Art Museum in Omaha, Nebraska, as well as in annual exhibitions in Lincoln, Kearney and Grand Island, where she lived. She was married to Dr. Franklin Dell Ryder, who was a well-known physician in Grand Island, Nebraska. She studied art under Augustus Dunbier and Lenore Benolken in Omaha, Nebraska, as well as under William A. Patty in California.
