= Augustus Dunbier =

American painter (1888–1977)

- Born: January 1, 1888; Osceola, Nebraska
- Died: September 11, 1977 (aged 89); Omaha, Nebraska
- Known for: Painting

Augustus William Dunbier (January 1, 1888 – September 11, 1977), was a Nebraskan Impressionist painter, best known for his landscapes. Dunbier was educated in Dusseldorf, Germany at the Royal Academy of Fine Arts. He continued his education at the Art Institute of Chicago. He often worked in the southwest United States and painted landscapes, still lives, and portraits. One of his students was fellow Nebraska artist Eve Ryder.
