= Mike Bockoven =

American author of horror and thriller novels

- Writing career
- Language: English
- Genres: Horror, thriller
- Notable work: Fantasticland
- Website: mikebockoven.com

Mike Bockoven is an American author of horror and thriller novels. He is known for his debut novel Fantasticland, which was published in 2016 by Skyhorse Publishing.

== Career ==
Prior to publishing Fantasticland in 2016, Bockoven worked as a community journalist. He came up with the novel's concept during a family trip to Disney World and questioning how the park would fare in a worst case scenario. Bockoven continued writing the novel while working at a local history museum in Grand Island, Nebraska, where he also lives. Fantasticland received favorable reception upon release, and at one point was adapted into a stage play for the Lafayette Town Hall Theatre. Per Bockoven, the film and television rights to Fantasticland have been optioned.

== Bibliography ==
- Fantasticland (2016, Skyhorse Publishing)
- Pack (2018, Talos)
- Killing It (2023, Polis Books)
- Come Knocking (2025, Skyhorse Publishing)
- Your Best Chance of Survival (2027, Atria Books)
