= KROA =

My Bridge Radio Flagship Station
- Grand Island, Nebraska; United States
- Broadcast area: Grand Island-Kearney
- Frequency: 95.7 MHz
- Branding: My Bridge Radio

Programming
- Format: Christian contemporary

Ownership
- Owner: My Bridge Radio
- Sister stations: KHZY, KMBV, KMMJ, KPNY, KQIQ, KRKR, KSSH, KXNG, KZLW

Technical information
- Licensing authority: FCC
- Facility ID: 24712
- Class: C1
- ERP: 100,000 watts
- HAAT: 140 meters (460 ft)
- Transmitter coordinates: 40°47′11″N 98°22′1.2″W
- Repeater: See § My Bridge Radio Network

Links
- Public license information: Public file; LMS
- Webcast: Listen live
- Website: www.mybridgeradio.net

KROA (95.7 FM) is a radio station broadcasting a Christian contemporary format. Licensed to Grand Island, Nebraska, United States, the station serves the Grand Island-Kearney area. The station is currently owned by My Bridge Radio.

KROA is the flagship station of the "My Bridge Radio" network of Christian radio stations in Nebraska. Other full-power stations in the network include KRKR Lincoln, KQIQ Beatrice, KPNY Alliance, KZLW Gretna, KMBV Valentine, KHZY Overton, KSSH Shubert, and KXNG Lexington. The range of each station (except KMBV, KSSH, KQIQ, and KXNG) is also extended via a network of translators.

My Bridge Radio also owns 750 KMMJ and 104.7 K284DC in Grand Island, Nebraska, which broadcast in Spanish.

Former logo

== My Bridge Radio Network ==
Call sign	Frequency	City of license	Facility ID	Class	ERP (W)	Height (m (ft))	Transmitter coordinates
KPNY	102.3 FM	Alliance, Nebraska	25879	C0	100,000	412 meters (1,352 ft)	41°50′27.9″N 103°4′28.7″W
KQIQ	88.3 FM	Beatrice, Nebraska	93284	A	4,200	103 meters (338 ft)	40°10′57″N 96°58′33.1″W
KZLW	90.1 FM	Gretna, Nebraska	175203	C1	100,000	21 meters (69 ft)	41°12′27″N 96°40′39.1″W
KXNG	91.3 FM	Lexington, Nebraska	763072	C1	57,000	109 meters (358 ft)	40°41′50″N 99°47′18.0″W
KHZY	99.3 FM	Overton, Nebraska	164307	C1	100,000	229 meters (751 ft)	40°41′49″N 99°47′17.4″W
KSSH	91.7 FM	Shubert, Nebraska	177193	A	3,100	104 meters (341 ft)	40°13′56″N 95°45′56″W
KMBV	90.7 FM	Valentine, Nebraska	171632	A	2,300	33 meters (108 ft)	42°53′17″N 100°33′12.5″W
KRKR	95.1 FM	Waverly, Nebraska	54707	C2	50,000	84 meters (276 ft)	40°58′48″N 96°41′47.1″W

=== Translators ===
Call sign	Frequency (MHz)	City of license	Facility ID	Rebroadcasts
K287AX	105.3	Chadron, Nebraska	146279	KPNY
K202CJ	88.3	Deshler, Nebraska	83068	KROA
K295BC	106.9	Geneva, Nebraska	155260	KROA
K260AF	99.9	Kearney, Nebraska	83648	KROA
K224DJ	92.7	La Vista, Nebraska	140345	KRKR
K257GW	99.3	Nebraska City, Nebraska	154135	KRKR
K232EC	94.3	North Platte, Nebraska	146283	KHZY
K238BC	95.5	Ogallala, Nebraska	147662	KHZY
K282AX	104.3	Paxton, Nebraska	146284	KHZY
K204FC	88.7	Sidney, Nebraska	154210	KPNY
