= KJTF =

- North Platte, Nebraska; United States
- Frequency: 89.3 MHz

Programming
- Format: Christian radio

Ownership
- Owner: Tri-State Broadcasting Association
- Sister stations: KJLT, KJLT-FM

History
- First air date: January 2011

Technical information
- Licensing authority: FCC
- Facility ID: 175433
- Class: A
- ERP: 690 watts
- HAAT: 164 meters (538 ft)
- Transmitter coordinates: 40°59′49″N 100°52′47″W
- Repeater: 94.9 KJLT-HD2 (North Platte)

Links
- Public license information: Public file; LMS
- Webcast: Listen live
- Website: kjlt.org

KJTF is a Christian radio station licensed to North Platte, Nebraska, broadcasting on 89.3 FM. The station is owned by Tri-State Broadcasting Association.

KJTF plays a variety of Christian music, as well as Christian talk and teaching programming including: Turning Point with David Jeremiah, Insight for Living with Chuck Swindoll, Back to the Bible, Focus on the Family, Truth for Life with Alistair Begg, Love Worth Finding with Adrian Rogers, the Moody Church hour with Erwin Lutzer, and In Touch with Charles Stanley.
