= Shane Farritor =

American mechanical engineer and roboticist

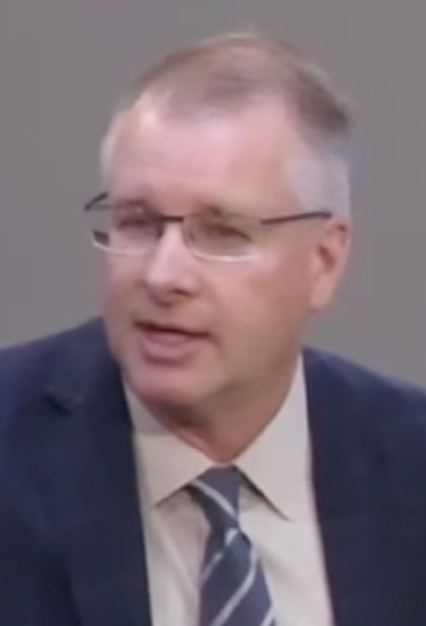
- Farritor in 2015
- Education: University of Nebraska–Lincoln; Massachusetts Institute of Technology
- Children: 3; including Luke
- Scientific career
- Fields: Mechanical engineering, robotics
- Workplaces: University of Nebraska–Lincoln

Shane Farritor is an American mechanical engineer and roboticist who is the David B. and Nancy K. Lederer Professor of Engineering at the University of Nebraska–Lincoln. His research focuses on surgical robotics, railroad safety, and robotic systems, and he is a co-founder of Virtual Incision Corporation and MRail Inc.

== Early life and education ==
Farritor is from Ravenna, Nebraska, one of seven children. He earned a B.S. from the University of Nebraska–Lincoln (UNL) in 1992. Farritor attended the Massachusetts Institute of Technology (MIT), where he received a M.S. in 1994 and a Ph.D. in 1998.

== Career ==
Farritor worked at the Field and Space Robotics Laboratory at MIT and the Unmanned Vehicle Lab at Draper Laboratory. He also conducted research at the Kennedy Space Center, Goddard Space Flight Center, and Jet Propulsion Laboratory. In 1998, Farritor joined the University of Nebraska-Lincoln (UNL) faculty as a professor in the Department of Mechanical and Materials Engineering.

His research has included projects such as robotic highway safety markers, miniature surgical robots, real-time measurement of track stiffness, and planetary cliff descent using cooperative robots. In 2002, he began developing robotic traffic cones and barrels that could be controlled remotely or programmed to move autonomously. This research, funded by a National Academy of Sciences grant, was conducted in collaboration with graduate students and computer science professor Steve Goddard.

Farritor has contributed to surgical robotics research, co-founding Virtual Incision Corporation, which develops miniaturized robotic devices for general abdominal surgery. In early 2016, Virtual Incision relocated to Nebraska Innovation Campus. His robotics work also extends to railroad safety, where he led a team that developed a sensor system to measure track integrity and identify potential derailment risks. This technology was commercialized through MRail Inc., which tests railroad tracks across North America.

In 2016, Farritor was named a Fellow of the National Academy of Inventors. This research, funded by a National Academy of Sciences grant, was conducted in collaboration with graduate students and computer science professor Steve Goddard. In 2020, he obtained a federal Paycheck Protection Program (PPP) Loan worth $31,800 to maintain his work force during the COVID-19 pandemic. As of 2024, his research on surgical robots has included tests conducted in space.

== Personal life ==
Farritor has four home-schooled children, including DOGE software engineer Luke Farritor.
