= KOOQ =

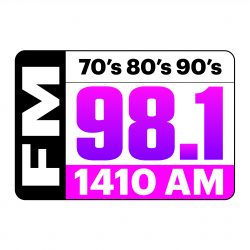
- North Platte, Nebraska; United States
- Broadcast area: North Platte, Nebraska
- Frequency: 1410 kHz
- Branding: FM 98.1/1410 AM

Programming
- Format: Classic hits

Ownership
- Owner: Eagle Communications, Inc.
- Sister stations: KELN, KNPQ, KZTL

History
- First air date: January 1966
- Former call signs: KNOP (1966–1972); KAHL (1972–1983)

Technical information
- Licensing authority: FCC
- Facility ID: 69701
- Class: B
- Power: 5,000 watts day; 500 watts night
- Transmitter coordinates: 41°10′30.00″N 100°45′7.00″W
- Translator: 98.1 K251CP (North Platte)

Links
- Public license information: Public file; LMS
- Webcast: Listen Live
- Website: northplattepost.com

KOOQ (1410 AM) is a radio station broadcasting a classic hits format to the North Platte, Nebraska, United States, area. The station was launched in January 1966 and is owned by Eagle Communications, Inc.

== History ==
KOOQ was originally launched under the call sign KNOP in January 1966. It was originally an affiliate of CBS Radio.

In December 1968, it was announced that KNOP would drop CBS and would be changing to ABC effective January 1, 1969.

In 1972, Dahl applied for the call sign to change from KNOP to KAHL.

In 1982, Dahl filed an application with the FCC to sell controlling interest to Valley Communications, Inc. On January 1, 1983, KAHL's call sign changed again to its current sign, KOOQ.

In 2007, it was announced that KOOQ would be dropping Oldies and would be affiliating with ESPN Radio.

On December 1, 2018, KOOQ dropped ESPN Radio and began stunting with Christmas music as "Reindeer Radio".

On December 27, 2018, after almost a month-long stunting with Christmas music, the station's format was changed to classic hits under the branding FM 98.1/1410 AM, focusing on music from the 1970s, 1980s and 1990s.
