= KNPQ =

- Hershey, Nebraska; United States
- Broadcast area: North Platte, Nebraska
- Frequency: 107.3 MHz
- Branding: Q Country Legends 107.3

Programming
- Format: Classic country

Ownership
- Owner: Eagle Communications
- Sister stations: KELN, KOOQ, KZTL

History
- First air date: 2008

Technical information
- Licensing authority: FCC
- Facility ID: 164169
- Class: C3
- ERP: 25,000 watts
- HAAT: 69 meters (226 ft)
- Transmitter coordinates: 41°9′14″N 100°46′22.4″W

Links
- Public license information: Public file; LMS
- Website: knpqcountry.com

KNPQ (107.3 FM) is a radio station licensed to Hershey, Nebraska, United States, the station serves the North Platte area. The station is currently owned by Eagle Communications. The station has obtained a construction permit from the FCC for a power increase to 100,000 watts.

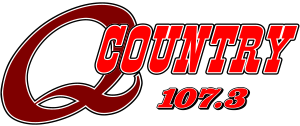
Former logo

On December 28, 2020, KNPQ shifted its format to classic country, branded as "Q Country Legends 107.3".
