= Ravenna, Nebraska =

- City
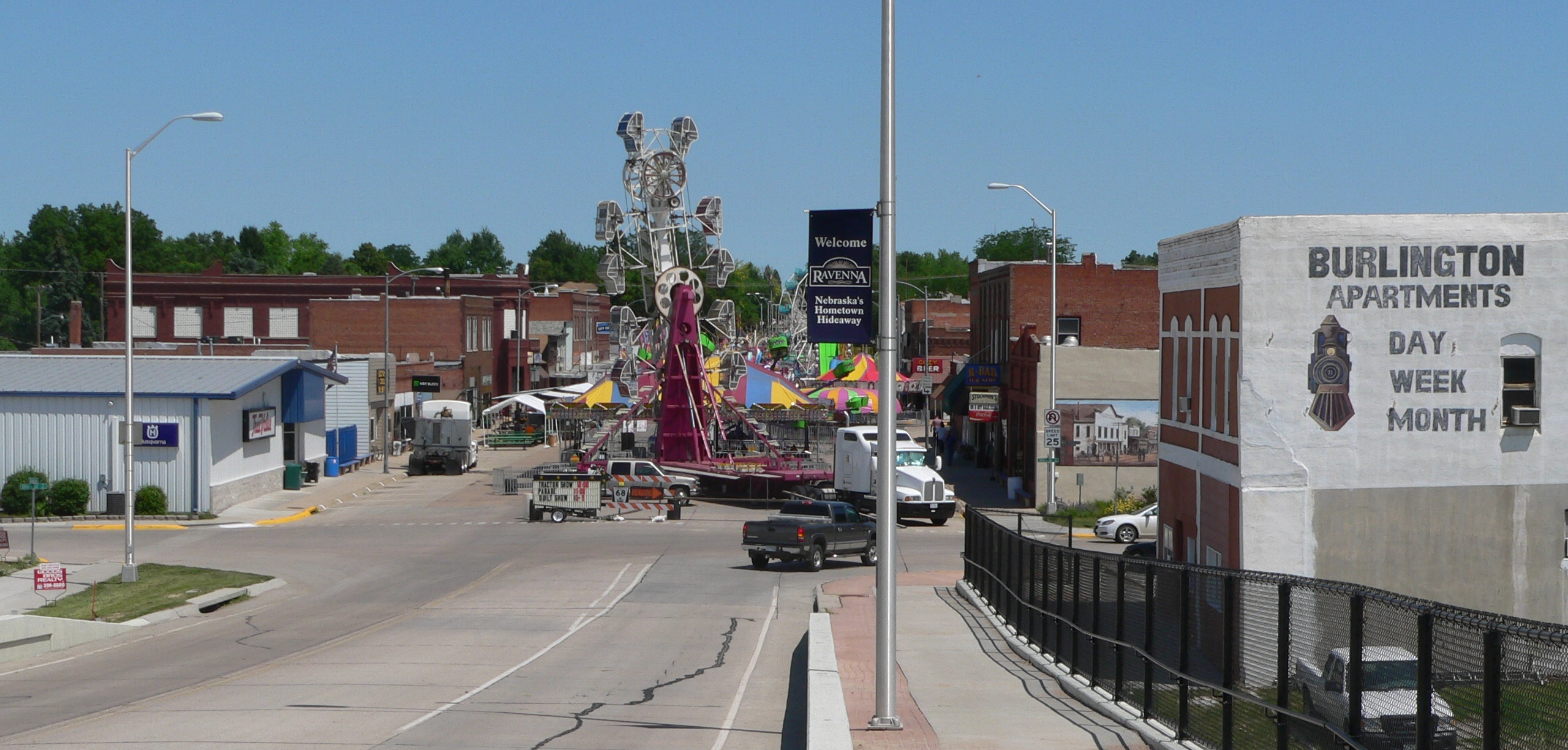
- Downtown Ravenna during Annevar festival

- Location of Ravenna, Nebraska
- Coordinates: 41°01′44″N 98°54′42″W
- Country: United States
- State: Nebraska
- County: Buffalo

Area
  - Total: 1.66 sq mi (4.31 km^{2})
  - Land: 1.66 sq mi (4.30 km^{2})
  - Water: 0.0039 sq mi (0.01 km^{2})
- Elevation: 2,015 ft (614 m)

Population (2020)
  - Total: 1,441
  - Density: 867.8/sq mi (335.05/km^{2})
- Time zone: UTC-6 (Central (CST))
  - Summer (DST): UTC-5 (CDT)
- ZIP code: 68869
- Area code: 308
- FIPS code: 31-40710
- GNIS feature ID: 838204
- Website: www.myravenna.com

Ravenna is a city in Buffalo County, Nebraska, United States. It is part of the Kearney, Nebraska Micropolitan Statistical Area. The population was 1,441 at the 2020 census.

== History ==
Ravenna was founded in 1886 when the Burlington Railroad was extended to that point. It was named after the city of Ravenna, Italy, and many of Ravenna's street names commemorate other Italian places.

Ravenna was incorporated in October 1886.

== Geography ==
According to the United States Census Bureau, the city has a total area of 1.67 square miles (4.33 km^{2}), of which 1.66 square miles (4.30 km^{2}) is land and 0.01 square miles (0.03 km^{2}) is water.

=== Climate ===
Climate data for Ravenna, Nebraska (1991–2020 normals, extremes 1893–present)
Month	Jan	Feb	Mar	Apr	May	Jun	Jul	Aug	Sep	Oct	Nov	Dec	Year
Record high °F (°C)	78 (26)	80 (27)	92 (33)	98 (37)	103 (39)	109 (43)	116 (47)	111 (44)	105 (41)	99 (37)	86 (30)	82 (28)	116 (47)
Mean maximum °F (°C)	61.7 (16.5)	65.8 (18.8)	78.0 (25.6)	85.3 (29.6)	90.7 (32.6)	95.1 (35.1)	97.8 (36.6)	95.2 (35.1)	91.8 (33.2)	86.5 (30.3)	74.2 (23.4)	62.1 (16.7)	99.0 (37.2)
Mean daily maximum °F (°C)	37.0 (2.8)	40.6 (4.8)	52.7 (11.5)	62.8 (17.1)	72.6 (22.6)	82.8 (28.2)	87.0 (30.6)	84.9 (29.4)	78.3 (25.7)	65.7 (18.7)	51.3 (10.7)	39.2 (4.0)	62.9 (17.2)
Daily mean °F (°C)	24.4 (−4.2)	27.6 (−2.4)	38.3 (3.5)	48.4 (9.1)	59.6 (15.3)	70.3 (21.3)	74.9 (23.8)	72.5 (22.5)	64.3 (17.9)	50.9 (10.5)	37.4 (3.0)	26.8 (−2.9)	49.6 (9.8)
Mean daily minimum °F (°C)	11.9 (−11.2)	14.6 (−9.7)	23.9 (−4.5)	34.0 (1.1)	46.6 (8.1)	57.7 (14.3)	62.9 (17.2)	60.1 (15.6)	50.2 (10.1)	36.1 (2.3)	23.4 (−4.8)	14.3 (−9.8)	36.3 (2.4)
Mean minimum °F (°C)	−9.1 (−22.8)	−5.0 (−20.6)	6.2 (−14.3)	19.1 (−7.2)	31.2 (−0.4)	43.9 (6.6)	52.1 (11.2)	49.1 (9.5)	34.1 (1.2)	19.6 (−6.9)	6.3 (−14.3)	−4.5 (−20.3)	−14.1 (−25.6)
Record low °F (°C)	−31 (−35)	−37 (−38)	−22 (−30)	−2 (−19)	18 (−8)	32 (0)	37 (3)	36 (2)	20 (−7)	4 (−16)	−15 (−26)	−31 (−35)	−37 (−38)
Average precipitation inches (mm)	0.52 (13)	0.64 (16)	1.39 (35)	2.70 (69)	3.94 (100)	4.41 (112)	3.77 (96)	3.34 (85)	2.06 (52)	2.10 (53)	0.96 (24)	0.67 (17)	26.50 (673)
Average snowfall inches (cm)	4.4 (11)	7.0 (18)	3.1 (7.9)	1.7 (4.3)	0.1 (0.25)	0.0 (0.0)	0.0 (0.0)	0.0 (0.0)	0.0 (0.0)	0.8 (2.0)	3.3 (8.4)	4.0 (10)	24.4 (62)
Average extreme snow depth inches (cm)	4 (10)	5 (13)	3 (7.6)	1 (2.5)	0 (0)	0 (0)	0 (0)	0 (0)	0 (0)	1 (2.5)	1 (2.5)	3 (7.6)	5 (13)
Average precipitation days (≥ 0.01 in)	3.1	3.8	4.9	7.3	10.1	9.1	7.3	6.9	5.4	5.3	3.7	3.1	70.0
Average snowy days (≥ 0.1 in)	2.2	2.5	1.2	0.9	0.1	0.0	0.0	0.0	0.0	0.4	1.4	2.2	10.9
Source: NOAA

== Demographics ==
Historical population
Census	Pop.	Note	%±
1890	628		—
1900	808		28.7%
1910	1,359		68.2%
1920	1,703		25.3%
1930	1,559		−8.5%
1940	1,429		−8.3%
1950	1,451		1.5%
1960	1,417		−2.3%
1970	1,356		−4.3%
1980	1,296		−4.4%
1990	1,317		1.6%
2000	1,341		1.8%
2010	1,360		1.4%
2020	1,441		6.0%
U.S. Decennial Census

=== 2010 census ===
As of the census of 2010, there were 1,360 people, 575 households, and 338 families living in the city. The population density was 819.3 inhabitants per square mile (316.3/km^{2}). There were 660 housing units at an average density of 397.6 per square mile (153.5/km^{2}). The racial makeup of the city was 98.2% White, 0.2% Native American, 0.4% Asian, and 1.3% from two or more races. Hispanic or Latino of any race were 2.0% of the population.

There were 575 households, of which 29.6% had children under the age of 18 living with them, 48.0% were married couples living together, 8.0% had a female householder with no husband present, 2.8% had a male householder with no wife present, and 41.2% were non-families. 35.8% of all households were made up of individuals, and 17.6% had someone living alone who was 65 years of age or older. The average household size was 2.30 and the average family size was 3.05.

The median age in the city was 40.9 years. 25.9% of residents were under the age of 18; 6.3% were between the ages of 18 and 24; 22.7% were from 25 to 44; 25.6% were from 45 to 64; and 19.5% were 65 years of age or older. The gender makeup of the city was 48.5% male and 51.5% female.

=== 2000 census ===
As of the census of 2000, there were 1,341 people, 534 households, and 349 families living in the city. The population density was 1,782.0 inhabitants per square mile (688.0/km^{2}). There were 600 housing units at an average density of 797.3 per square mile (307.8/km^{2}). The racial makeup of the city was 98.96% White, 0.15% Asian, 0.37% from other races, and 0.52% from two or more races. Hispanic or Latino of any race were 0.82% of the population.

There were 534 households, out of which 32.4% had children under the age of 18 living with them, 55.4% were married couples living together, 7.7% had a female householder with no husband present, and 34.5% were non-families. 31.5% of all households were made up of individuals, and 18.7% had someone living alone who was 65 years of age or older. The average household size was 2.39 and the average family size was 3.02.

The median age in the city was 39 years. The population distribution was: 26.9% under the age of 18, 6.1% from 18 to 24, 26.1% from 25 to 44, 17.0% from 45 to 64, and 23.9% aged 65 years or older. For every 100 females, there were 83.4 males. For every 100 females age 18 and over, there were 77.2 males.

As of 2000 the median income for a household in the city was $31,875, and the median income for a family was $39,609. Males had a median income of $31,111 versus $19,226 for females. The per capita income for the city was $15,953. About 3.7% of families and 7.6% of the population were below the poverty line, including 7.5% of those under age 18 and 13.7% of those age 65 or over.

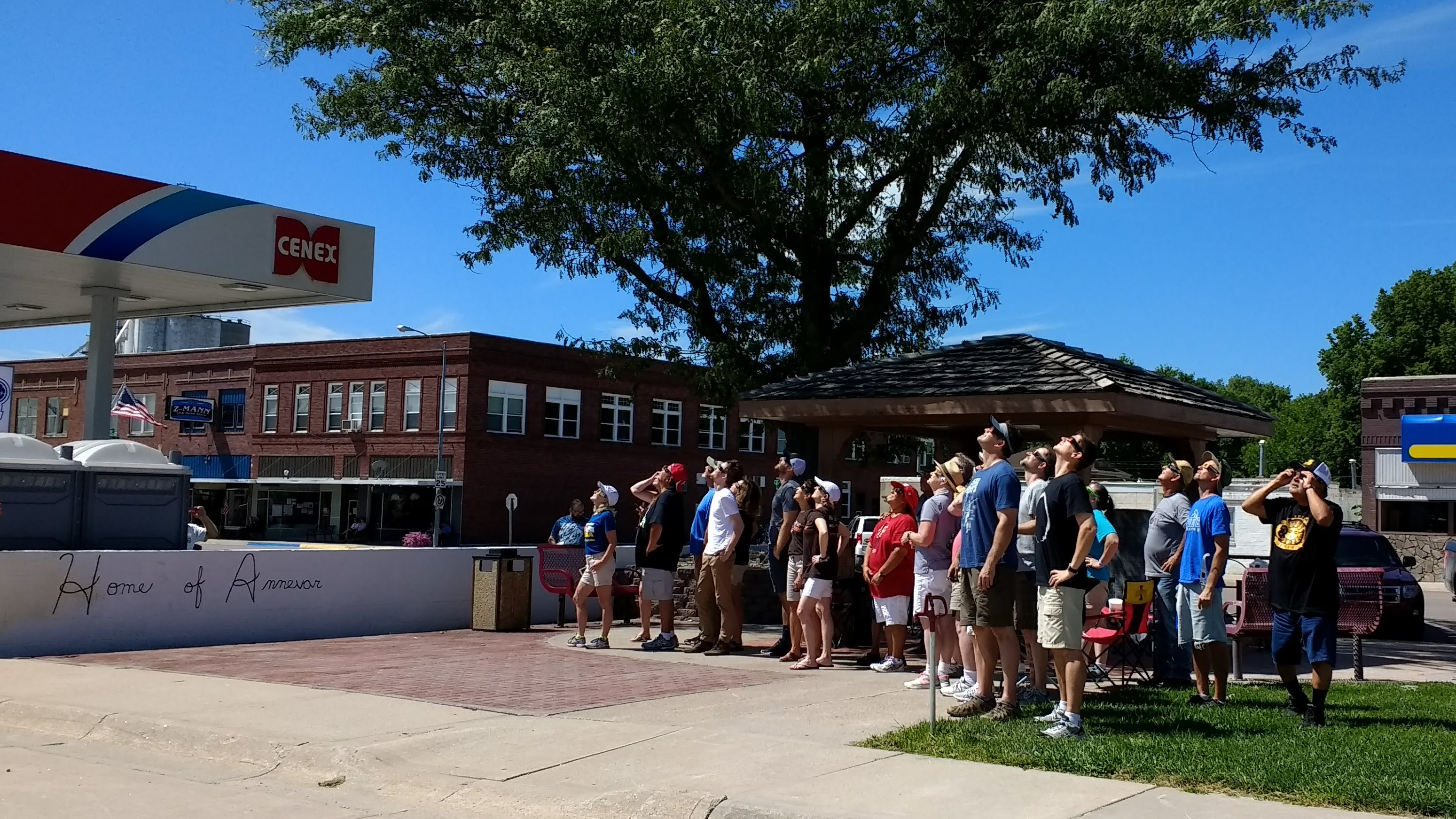
Visitors and residents gather to observe solar eclipse in Ravenna

== Culture and events ==
Ravenna is host to the annual city celebration named Annevar (Ravenna spelled backwards). Each year, the celebration includes a demolition derby, tractor pull, and other local recreational activities. During the solar eclipse of August 21, 2017, approximately 8,000 visitors came to the town from all over the United States and as far away as Europe, Japan, and Australia.

== Notable people ==
- Shane Farritor, mechanical engineer and roboticist
