= KZTL =

- Paxton, Nebraska; United States
- Broadcast area: North Platte, Nebraska
- Frequency: 93.5 MHz
- Branding: Z93.5

Programming
- Format: Country

Ownership
- Owner: Eagle Communications, Inc.
- Sister stations: KNPQ, KOOQ, KELN

History
- First air date: October 23, 2007; 18 years ago

Technical information
- Licensing authority: FCC
- Facility ID: 164138
- Class: C1
- ERP: 100,000 watts
- HAAT: 229.6 meters (753 ft)
- Transmitter coordinates: 41°3′50″N 101°20′16″W

Links
- Public license information: Public file; LMS
- Website: Z93.5 Country

KZTL (93.5 FM) is a radio station licensed to Paxton, Nebraska, United States. The station airs the Big D & Bubba Morning Show; Farm News nearly every hour during the weekday and plays exclusively pop and bro country. The station serves the North Platte and Ogallala, Nebraska area in western Nebraska. The station is currently owned by Eagle Communications, Inc.

== Ownership ==
KZTL launched in the fall of 2007 as Wild Country 93.5 airing New and Up-and-coming New Country Artists.

In May 2013, Armada Media and Legacy Broadcasting traded some stations in Nebraska, with two stations in Holdrege (KUVR/1380 and KMTY/97.7) going to Legacy and eight others in the Scottsbluff and North Platte markets [KZTL/93.5 (Paxton-North Platte) and KRNP/100.7 (Sutherland-North Platte), KOAQ/690 (Terrytown), KOLT/1320 (Scottsbluff), KMOR/93.3 (Gering), KETT/99.3 (Mitchell), KOZY-FM/101.3 (Bridgeport), KHYY/106.9 (Minatare)] going to Armada Media. A purchase price was not announced.

On April 22, 2018, KZTL changed their format from adult contemporary to Classic Country, re-branded as "Country 93.5". The change was coincident with Legacy Communications resuming operation of the station after Armada Media's LMA expired.

In October 2020, KZTL rebranded as "Z93.5".

Effective December 2, 2020, Legacy Communications sold KZTL and KRNP to Eagle Communications, Inc. for $800,000.
