= KJLT-FM =

Radio station in North Platte, Nebraska

- North Platte, Nebraska; United States
- Frequency: 94.9 MHz (HD Radio)

Programming
- Format: Christian Radio
- Subchannels: HD2: KJTF simulcast HD3: KJLT (AM) simulcast
- Affiliations: SRN News

Ownership
- Owner: Tri-State Broadcasting Association
- Sister stations: KJLT (AM), KJTF

History
- First air date: September 24, 1979
- Former call signs: KODY-FM (1979–1986); KSRZ-FM (1986–1990)

Technical information
- Licensing authority: FCC
- Facility ID: 67761
- Class: C1
- ERP: 100,000 watts
- HAAT: 230 meters (750 ft)
- Transmitter coordinates: 40°59′49″N 100°52′49″W

Links
- Public license information: Public file; LMS
- Webcast: Listen live
- Website: kjlt.org

KJLT-FM (94.9 MHz) is a Christian radio station licensed to North Platte, Nebraska. The station is owned by Tri-State Broadcasting Association.

== Programming ==
KJLT-FM plays a variety of Christian Music, as well as Christian Talk and Teaching programming including; Insight for Living with Chuck Swindoll, Love Worth Finding with Adrian Rogers, Focus on the Family, and Joni and Friends.

== History ==
The station began broadcasting September 24, 1979, and originally held the call sign KODY-FM, airing a country music format. The station was owned by North Platte Broadcasting. In 1986, the station's call sign was changed to KSRZ-FM. As KSRZ-FM, the station aired an adult contemporary format. In 1990, the station was sold to Tri-State Broadcasting for $85,000.

That year, the station's call sign was changed to KJLT-FM, and the station adopted a Christian format, becoming an FM companion to the much older KJLT (AM)

== Translators ==
KJLT-FM is also heard on translators throughout Nebraska and North-East Colorado.

Call sign	Frequency	City of license	FID	ERP (W)	Class	FCC info
K210CB	89.9 FM	Broken Bow, Nebraska	88143	250	D	LMS
K211DP	90.1 FM	Alma, Nebraska	91198	250	D	LMS
K214DK	90.7 FM	Holdrege, Nebraska	92321	250	D	LMS
K218DY	91.5 FM	Holyoke, Colorado	91310	203	D	LMS
K230AP	93.9 FM	Hyannis, Nebraska	152902	250	D	LMS
K281AR	104.1 FM	Chappell, Nebraska	152935	205	D	LMS
