= KELN =

North Platte, Nebraska; United States
- Broadcast area: North Platte
- Frequency: 97.1 MHz
- Branding: Mix 97-1

Programming
- Language: English
- Format: Contemporary hit radio
- Affiliations: Westwood One

Ownership
- Owner: Eagle Communications, Inc.
- Sister stations: KNPQ; KOOQ; KZTL

History
- First air date: February 1979

Technical information
- Licensing authority: FCC
- Facility ID: 69699
- Class: C1
- ERP: 100,000 watts
- HAAT: 140 meters (460 ft)
- Transmitter coordinates: 41°14′20.00″N 100°41′43.00″W

Links
- Public license information: Public file; LMS
- Webcast: Listen live
- Website: mix97one.com

KELN (97.1 MHz) is a commercial contemporary hit radio station. Licensed to North Platte, Nebraska, United States. This station serves the North Platte area. The station is currently owned by Eagle Communications, Inc. and features locally originated programming.
