= KJLT (AM) =

- North Platte, Nebraska; United States
- Broadcast area: North Platte
- Frequency: 970 kHz

Programming
- Format: Christian radio

Ownership
- Owner: Tri-State Broadcasting Association
- Sister stations: KJLT-FM, KJTF

History
- First air date: December 26, 1952
- Former call signs: KNBR (1952–1956)

Technical information
- Licensing authority: FCC
- Facility ID: 67751
- Class: D
- Power: 5,000 watts day 55 watts night
- Transmitter coordinates: 41°9′36″N 100°52′43″W
- Repeater: 94.9 KJLT-HD3 (North Platte)

Links
- Public license information: Public file; LMS
- Website: http://www.kjlt.org

KJLT (970 kHz) is an AM radio station broadcasting a Christian format. Licensed to North Platte, Nebraska, United States, the station serves the North Platte area. The station is owned by Tri-State Broadcasting Association.

== Programming ==
KJLT airs a variety of Christian Talk and Teaching programming as well as Christian music. Christian Talk and Teaching programs include; Back to the Bible, In Touch with Dr. Charles Stanley, Turning Point with David Jeremiah, Insight for Living with Chuck Swindoll, Revive Our Hearts with Nancy DeMoss Wolgemuth, Love Worth Finding with Adrian Rogers, and Focus on the Family.

== History ==
The station began broadcasting December 26, 1952, holding the call sign KNBR and was owned by John Townsend. In the mid-1950s, the station's call sign was changed to KJLT, and the station's license was transferred to the Tri-State Broadcasting Association.

== Translator ==
KJLT is also heard on a translator on 95.7 FM in North Platte, Nebraska.

Call sign	Frequency	City of license	FID	ERP (W)	Class	FCC info
K239CI	95.7 FM	North Platte, Nebraska	156340	250	D	LMS
