= KMTY =

- Gibbon, Nebraska; United States
- Broadcast area: Kearney, Nebraska
- Frequency: 97.7 MHz
- Branding: Thunder 97.7

Programming
- Format: Active rock
- Affiliations: Compass Media Networks

Ownership
- Owner: Grand Island Family Radio; (Legacy Communications, LLC)
- Sister stations: KKJK, KRGI, KRGI-FM, KRGY

History
- First air date: 1970 (as KUVR-FM)
- Former call signs: KUVR-FM (1970–1984); KKTY-FM (1983–1989); KUVR-FM (1989–1996)

Technical information
- Licensing authority: FCC
- Facility ID: 27174
- Class: C1
- ERP: 50,000 watts
- HAAT: 148.3 meters (487 ft)
- Transmitter coordinates: 40°36′8″N 98°50′21″W

Links
- Public license information: Public file; LMS
- Webcast: Listen Live
- Website: thunderfm.rocks

KMTY (97.7 FM) is a radio station licensed to serve Gibbon, Nebraska, United States. The station is owned by Joseph Vavricek, through licensee Legacy Communications, LLC.

KMTY broadcasts an active rock format branded as "Thunder 97.7" to the greater Kearney, Nebraska, area. KMTY previously aired a country music format branded as "Big Country" and before that, an adult hits music format branded as "Jack FM" and before that a similar adult hits format as "Bob FM". In addition to its music programming, KMTY broadcasts Major League Baseball games as an affiliate of the Kansas City Royals radio network.

The station was assigned the KMTY call sign by the U.S. Federal Communications Commission (FCC) on April 1, 1996.

== History ==
On September 30, 2011, KMTY was granted an FCC construction permit to change the city of license from Holdrege, Nebraska to Gibbon, Nebraska, move to a new transmitter site, increase ERP to 100,000 watts and decrease HAAT to 42 meters.

In May 2013, Armada Media and Legacy Broadcasting traded some stations in Nebraska, with two stations in Holdrege (KUVR and KMTY) going to Legacy and eight others in the Scottsbluff and North Platte markets (KZTL, KRNP, KOAQ, KOLT, KMOR, KETT, KOZY-FM and KHYY) going to Armada Media. The transaction was completed on October 11, 2013, for a purchase price of $800,000.

On June 17, 2013, KMTY changed their format from adult hits (branded as "Jack FM") to country, branded as "Big Country 97.7".

The move from Holdrege to Gibbon was licensed by the FCC on August 25, 2014.

On September 6, 2021, KMTY flipped to active rock, branded as "Thunder 97.7 & 99.7".

In March 2026, it was announced that the station would relaunch as 97.7 The Zone on March 16; the new format will simulcast the daily sports talk lineup of Omaha's KOZN, while maintaining an active rock format outside of these hours.
