= KRGY =

- Aurora, Nebraska; United States
- Broadcast area: Grand Island-Kearney
- Frequency: 97.3 MHz
- Branding: 97-3 The Wolf

Programming
- Format: Classic rock
- Affiliations: ABC Radio

Ownership
- Owner: Legacy Communications, LLC
- Sister stations: KKJK

History
- First air date: 1980
- Former call signs: KKBB (1985–1987); KMTY (1987–1992); KLRB (1992–2001)

Technical information
- Licensing authority: FCC
- Facility ID: 9936
- Class: C2
- ERP: 50,000 watts
- HAAT: 106 meters (348 ft)
- Transmitter coordinates: 40°52′44.00″N 98°5′36.00″W

Links
- Public license information: Public file; LMS
- Webcast: Listen Live
- Website: thewolf973fm.com

KRGY (97.3 FM) is a radio station broadcasting a classic rock format. Licensed to Aurora, Nebraska, United States, the station serves the Grand Island-Kearney area. The station is currently owned by Legacy Communications, LLC and features programming from ABC Radio.

On October 1, 2010, KRGY changed their format from hot adult contemporary to classic rock, branded as "The Wolf".

== Previous logo ==
(KRGY's previous "Star 97.3" logo)
