= Paxton, Nebraska =

- Village
- Downtown Paxton

- Location of Paxton, Nebraska
- Coordinates: 41°07′24″N 101°21′07″W
- Country: United States of America
- State: Nebraska
- County: Keith

Area
  - Total: 1.03 sq mi (2.67 km^{2})
  - Land: 1.03 sq mi (2.67 km^{2})
  - Water: 0 sq mi (0.00 km^{2})
- Elevation: 3,058 ft (932 m)

Population (2020)
  - Total: 516
  - Density: 500.0/sq mi (193.05/km^{2})
- Time zone: UTC-7 (Mountain (MST))
  - Summer (DST): UTC-6 (MDT)
- ZIP code: 69155
- Area code: 308
- FIPS code: 31-38610
- GNIS feature ID: 2399636

Paxton is a village in Keith County, Nebraska, United States. As of the 2020 census, Paxton had a population of 516.

== History ==
Paxton, Nebraska, originally known as Alkali, owes its early existence to the construction of the first Transcontinental Railroad in the late 1860s. The town's name reflected the high alkaline content of the soil in the area. This small but resilient community began as a simple siding along the Union Pacific Railroad, complete with a telegraph station, water tower, and depot. Its roots trace back to Edwin Searle Sr., an 18-year-old telegraph operator who arrived in 1867. Living initially in a tent, Searle quickly became a notable figure in the settlement's early days, and his son, Edwin Searle Jr., born in 1873, holds the distinction of being the first white child born in Keith County.

Before the siding became Alkali, the surrounding area hosted Fort Alkali, a small fortress protecting Oregon Trail settlers and later railroad workers. Alkali’s transformation began as settlers arrived in the 1870s, following the extermination of buffalo herds and the rise of ranching. William A. Paxton, a prominent Omaha rancher and businessman, acquired significant land in the area, alongside other figures like John Bratt and Morrell Keith. Paxton, whose entrepreneurial ventures stretched from cattle ranching to banking and ironworks, eventually became the namesake of the community when Alkali was renamed Paxton in 1885.

By the 1880s, abundant rainfall encouraged settlement. Pioneers like Ann LeDioyt, who filed the first homestead claim, and the Lawler family, who brought cattle to the area, established the foundations of a thriving agricultural community. The village of Paxton incorporated in 1885 and began expanding its infrastructure with the construction of bridges, a school, and a growing array of businesses.

The 1890s were a time of both prosperity and hardship. Despite a severe drought and economic recession, Paxton remained resilient. Its Bank of Paxton was the last financial institution in Keith County to close during the downturn. Social and cultural growth accompanied economic endeavors. Churches, such as Methodist (1886) and Catholic (1887), sprang up, and The Globe Hotel, run by the Stafford family, became a hub for railroad workers and visitors.

The town's economy received a boost in the early 20th century with the construction of the Lincoln Highway, the first transcontinental road in the United States, which passed through Paxton. Paxton also embraced modernity with a municipal light plant, though its initial limitations (shutting off at 10 p.m.) sparked frustration among residents.

The 1930s brought the dual pressures of the Great Depression and agricultural challenges, but Paxton adapted. The construction of Kingsley Dam and the development of supplemental water systems revitalized the local economy. The town also gained cultural significance with the opening of Ole's Tavern in 1933, a business that became a lasting community centerpiece.

Today, Paxton is a small community with a population of around 500. Its history reflects the spirit of the American West, shaped by pioneers, ranchers, and entrepreneurs who turned a humble railroad siding into a vibrant town.

== Geography ==
According to the United States Census Bureau, the village has a total area of 1.03 square miles (2.67 km^{2}), all land.

== Demographics ==
Historical population
Census	Pop.	Note	%±
1910	179		—
1920	430		140.2%
1930	507		17.9%
1940	551		8.7%
1950	606		10.0%
1960	566		−6.6%
1970	503		−11.1%
1980	568		12.9%
1990	536		−5.6%
2000	614		14.6%
2010	523		−14.8%
2020	516		−1.3%
U.S. Decennial Census

=== 2010 census ===
As of the census of 2010, there were 523 people, 226 households, and 146 families living in the village. The population density was 507.8 inhabitants per square mile (196.1/km^{2}). There were 248 housing units at an average density of 240.8 per square mile (93.0/km^{2}). The racial makeup of the village was 98.3% White, 1.0% Asian, 0.4% from other races, and 0.4% from two or more races. Hispanic or Latino of any race were 1.9% of the population.

There were 226 households, of which 28.3% had children under the age of 18 living with them, 53.1% were married couples living together, 8.8% had a female householder with no husband present, 2.7% had a male householder with no wife present, and 35.4% were non-families. 31.4% of all households were made up of individuals, and 11.1% had someone living alone who was 65 years of age or older. The average household size was 2.31 and the average family size was 2.97.

The median age in the village was 41.9 years. 25.8% of residents were under the age of 18; 5.9% were between the ages of 18 and 24; 23.5% were from 25 to 44; 32% were from 45 to 64; and 12.8% were 65 years of age or older. The gender makeup of the village was 52.2% male and 47.8% female.

=== 2000 census ===
As of the census of 2000, there were 614 people, 237 households, and 169 families living in the village. The population density was 1,118.4 inhabitants per square mile (431.8/km^{2}). There were 248 housing units at an average density of 451.7 per square mile (174.4/km^{2}). The racial makeup of the village was 97.72% White, 0.49% African American, 0.49% Native American, 0.16% Asian, 0.33% from other races, and 0.81% from two or more races. Hispanic or Latino of any race were 1.63% of the population.

There were 237 households, out of which 38.8% had children under the age of 18 living with them, 62.0% were married couples living together, 6.8% had a female householder with no husband present, and 28.3% were non-families. 24.9% of all households were made up of individuals, and 13.1% had someone living alone who was 65 years of age or older. The average household size was 2.59 and the average family size was 3.11.

In the village, the population was spread out, with 29.5% under the age of 18, 5.0% from 18 to 24, 27.9% from 25 to 44, 22.3% from 45 to 64, and 15.3% who were 65 years of age or older. The median age was 38 years. For every 100 females, there were 97.4 males. For every 100 females age 18 and over, there were 92.4 males.

As of 2000 the median income for a household in the village was $28,523, and the median income for a family was $34,063. Males had a median income of $25,833 versus $17,500 for females. The per capita income for the village was $12,988. About 9.2% of families and 9.5% of the population were below the poverty line, including 10.6% of those under age 18 and 9.3% of those age 65 or over.

== Notable people ==
- Josh Rouse, singer-songwriter
