= KRGI (AM) =

- Grand Island, Nebraska; United States
- Broadcast area: Grand Island-Kearney
- Frequency: 1430 kHz
- Branding: AM 1430 KRGI

Programming
- Format: News Talk Information
- Affiliations: ABC News Radio

Ownership
- Owner: Legacy Communications, LLC
- Sister stations: KRGI-FM

History
- First air date: April 1, 1953

Technical information
- Licensing authority: FCC
- Facility ID: 32382
- Class: D
- Power: 5,000 watts day 21 watts night
- Transmitter coordinates: 40°52′17.00″N 98°16′27.00″W
- Translator: 105.5 K288HC (Grand Island)

Links
- Public license information: Public file; LMS
- Webcast: Listen live
- Website: krgi.com/index

KRGI (1430 kHz) is an AM radio station broadcasting a News Talk Information format. Licensed to Grand Island, Nebraska, United States, the station serves the Grand Island-Kearney area. The station is currently owned by Legacy Communications, LLC and features programming from ABC News Radio.

KRGI went on the air on April 1, 1953, as an independent radio station.

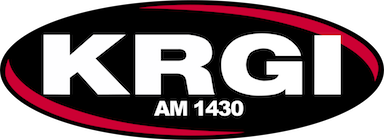
Logo before translator sign on
