= KRGI-FM =

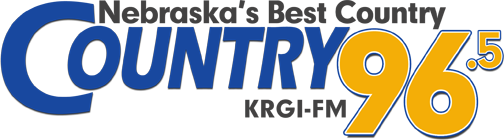
- Grand Island, Nebraska; United States
- Broadcast area: Grand Island-Kearney
- Frequency: 96.5 MHz (HD Radio)
- Branding: Country 96.5

Programming
- Format: Country music
- Subchannels: HD2: La Gran D (Regional Mexican); HD3: Jett-FM 99.7 (Contemporary Christian); HD4: Mix 103.5 (Classic hip hop)
- Affiliations: Cumulus Media Networks, Premiere Radio Networks

Ownership
- Owner: Legacy Communications, LLC

History
- First air date: October 20, 1975

Technical information
- Licensing authority: FCC
- Facility ID: 32381
- Class: C1
- ERP: 100,000 watts
- HAAT: 128 meters (420 ft)
- Transmitter coordinates: 40°51′53.00″N 98°23′47.00″W
- Translators: HD2: 93.3 K227BQ (Grand Island); HD3: 99.7 K259CZ (Grand Island); HD4: 103.5 K278BR (Grand Island)

Links
- Public license information: Public file; LMS
- Webcast: Listen live; Listen live (HD2); Listen live (HD3); Listen live (HD4)
- Website: nebraskasbestcountry.com; krgi.com/la-grand; lagrand933.com (HD2); jettfm.com (HD3); mix1035.com (HD4)

KRGI-FM (96.5 MHz) is a radio station broadcasting a new country format. Licensed to Grand Island, Nebraska, United States, the station serves the Grand Island-Kearney area. The station is currently owned by Legacy Communications, LLC and features programming from ABC Radio, Premiere Radio Networks and Jones Radio Network.

== KRGI-HD2 ==
KRGI airs a regional Mexican format on its HD2 subchannel branded as "La Gran D" (simulcast on translator K227BQ 93.3 FM Grand Island).

== KRGI-HD3 ==
KRGI broadcasts an active rock format on its HD3 subchannel, branded as "Thunder 97.7 / 99.7" (simulcast on translator K259CZ (99.7 FM) in Grand Island, and on KMTY (97.7 FM) in Gibbon).

On December 1, 2025, KRGI-HD3 and K259CZ dropped its simulcast with KMTY and began stunting with Christmas music, branded as "All Christmas Station 99.7".

On January 5, 2026, KRGI-HD3 and K259CZ ended Christmas music stunting and launched a contemporary Christian format, branded as "Jett FM 99.7".

== KRGI-HD4 ==
On April 4, 2017, KRGI launched a classic country format on its HD4 subchannel, branded as "103.5 The Legend" (simulcast on K278BR 103.5 FM Grand Island).

On March 21, 2026, KRGI-HD4 and K278BR changed their format from classic country to classic hip hop, branded as "Mix 103.5".
