= Grand Island, Nebraska =

City in and county seat of Hall County, Nebraska, United States

Grand Island
- City
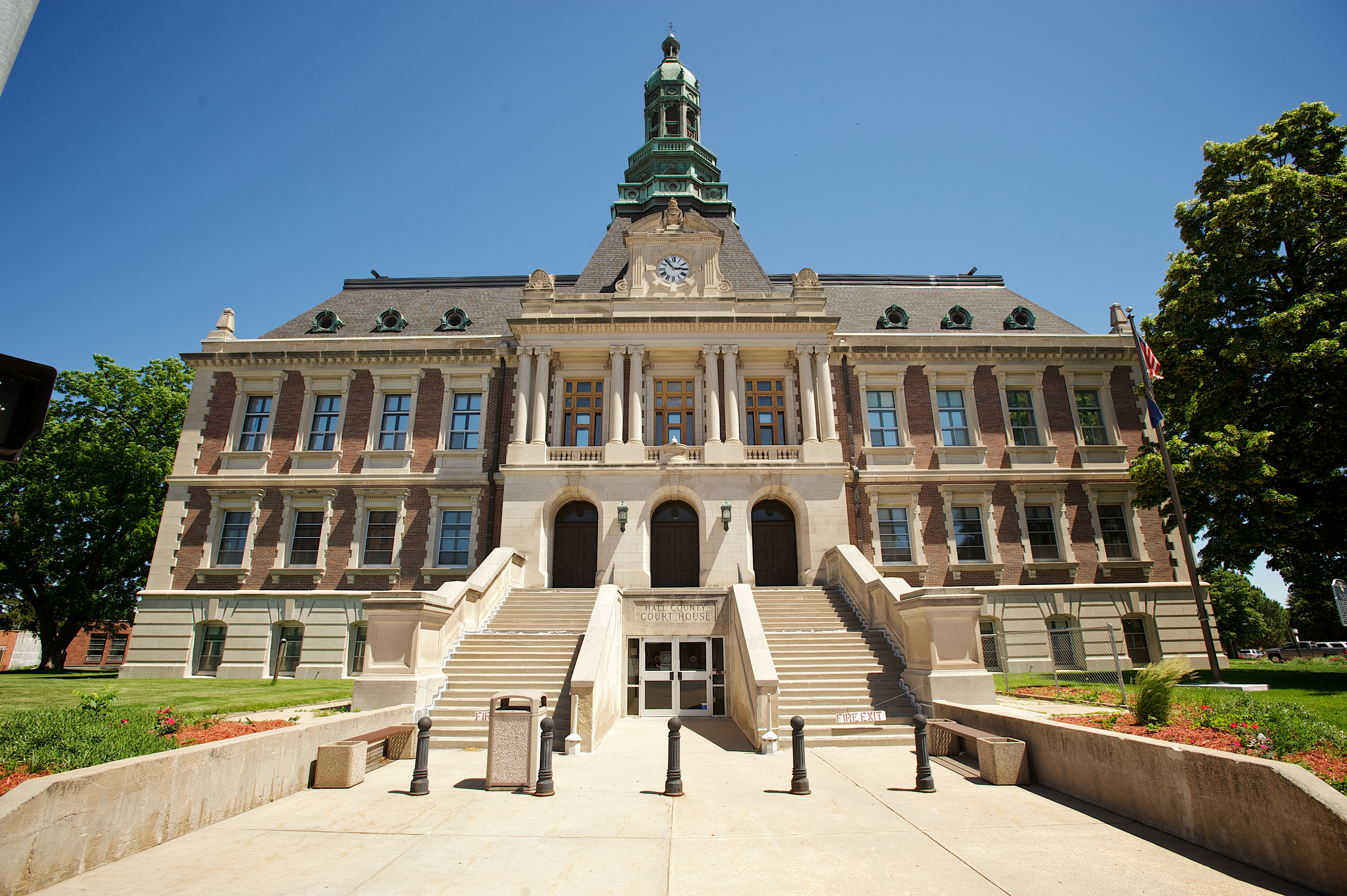
- Hall County Courthouse in Grand Island, June 2014

- Flag Logo
- Nickname: La Grande Ile
- Location of Grand Island in County and State

- Location in Nebraska Location in the United States
- Coordinates: 40°55′18″N 98°21′31″W
- Country: United States
- State: Nebraska
- County: Hall

Government
  - Mayor: Roger Steele

Area
  - Total: 30.29 sq mi (78.44 km^{2})
  - Land: 30.09 sq mi (77.92 km^{2})
  - Water: 0.20 sq mi (0.51 km^{2})
- Elevation: 1,870 ft (570 m)

Population (2020)
  - Total: 53,131
  - Rank: 4th in Nebraska
  - Density: 1,766.0/sq mi (681.85/km^{2})
- Demonym: Grand Islander
- Time zone: UTC−6 (CST)
  - Summer (DST): UTC−5 (CDT)
- ZIP code: 68801-68803
- Area code: 308
- FIPS code: 31-19595
- GNIS feature ID: 838031
- Website: grand-island.com

Grand Island is a city in and the county seat of Hall County, Nebraska, United States. The population was 53,131 at the 2020 census, making it the 4th most populous city in Nebraska. Grand Island is the principal city of the Grand Island metropolitan area, which consists of Hall, Merrick, and Howard counties. The Grand Island metropolitan area has an official population of 83,472 residents.

Grand Island is home to the Nebraska Law Enforcement Training Center, which is the sole agency responsible for training law enforcement officers throughout the state, as well as the home of the Southern Power District serving southern Nebraska. Ammunition manufacturer Hornady is also located there.

== History ==
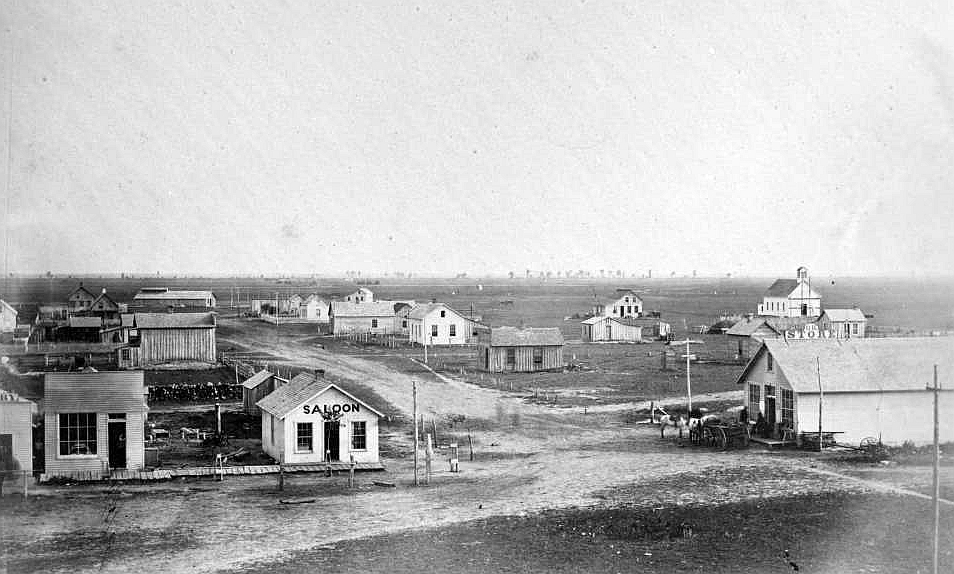
Grand Island, 1867

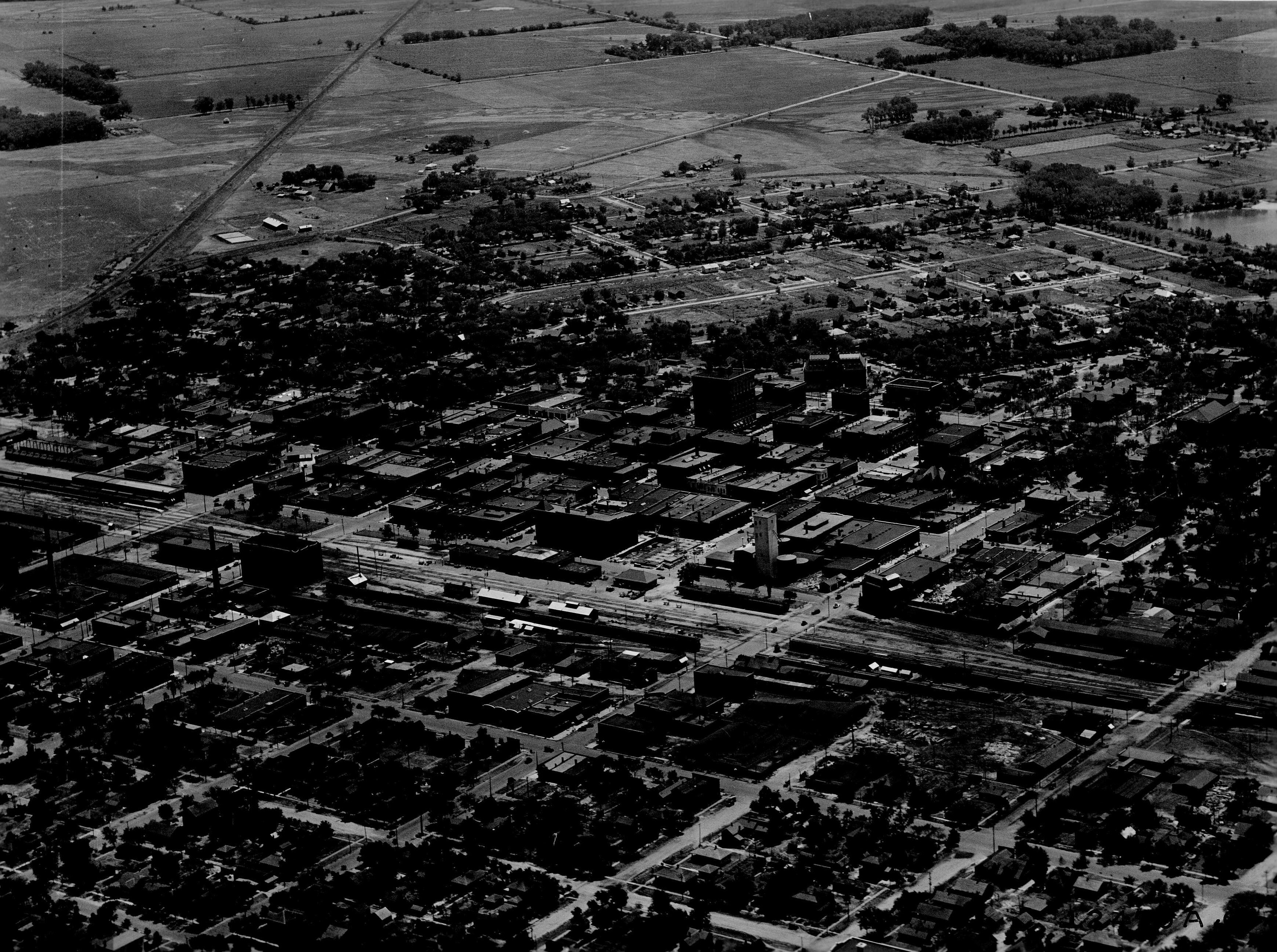
Aerial view of Grand Island, 1925

=== 19th century ===
When the persecuted Mormon community in Nauvoo, Illinois, decided to leave Nauvoo in 1844 in search of a new home, they intended at first to reach the Salt Lake Valley in Utah, but the weather made that impossible and so Grand Island was adopted as their interim goal for the summer of 1846, although in fact their settlements at the time remained closer to the Missouri River.

In 1857, 35 German settlers left Davenport, Iowa, and headed west to Nebraska to start a new settlement on an island known by French traders as La Grande Isle, which was formed by the Wood River and the Platte River. The settlers reached their destination on July 4, 1857, and by September had built housing using local timber. They set up farms but initially had no market to sell their goods until a market opened at Fort Kearny. When the Pike's Peak Gold Rush began, Grand Island was the last place travelers could obtain supplies before they crossed the plains.

Surveyors from the Union Pacific Railroad (UP) laid out a town called Grand Island Station and many settlers living on Grand Island moved to the new town, located slightly inland from the island. In 1868 the railroad reached the area, bringing increased trade and business. Grand Island became the end of the east division of the railroad and UP built service facilities for their locomotives in the town as well as an elegant hotel for passengers providing a boost for the local economy. The cost of the railroad coming into town was the denudement of most of the hardwood trees on the island for use as ties for the railroad. By 1870, 1,057 people lived in the town, and in 1872 the town was incorporated as Grand Island.

African Americans started living in the city from at least the 1870s, and by 1889 there was an established Black neighborhood in the city. A segregated city, for the first several decades Black people were mostly limited to servile roles as maids, chauffeurs, and other jobs.

In about 1890, sugar beets were introduced as a crop in Nebraska. The first sugar beet processing factory in the United States was built in the southwest part of Grand Island. By 1900, it was the state's third largest city.

=== 20th century ===
Throughout the 20th century, Grand Island experienced steady growth due to its strategic location along the railroad. The city remained Nebraska's third largest city throughout the entire century, before being surpassed by Bellevue in 2000.

By the 1920s there was an emerging Black middle class in the city, albeit very small. During World War II, the African American community grew exponentially because of employment at the nearby Cornhusker Army Ammunition Plant. A new segregated neighborhood was built by the federal government, and immediately after the war a community center and more were established. Despite the establishment of a Prince Hall Masons lodge, churches in the city and other institutions, the Black population did not remain stable, and by the 1960s it had dwindled to only 125 residents.

==== 1980 tornadoes ====
On June 3, 1980, Grand Island was hit by a massive supercell storm. Through the course of the evening, the city was ravaged by seven tornadoes, the worst of which was rated F4 on the Fujita Scale. The hardest hit area of town was the north Locust business district. There were five deaths as a result of the tornadoes.

Tornado Hill is a local landmark created as a direct result of the tornadoes. Debris that could not be recycled was burned near Fonner Park and what remained was buried within Ryder Park and J. Dibbern Park, on the west end of town. The base of the hill was a hole 6–8 feet (1.8–2.4 m) deep and nearly 200 feet (61 m) across, and the hill is 40 feet (12 m) high. It is used for sledding in this otherwise flat area.

A book, Night of the Twisters, by Ivy Ruckman, and movie were based on this event.

=== 21st century ===
Grand Island has experienced a number of revitalization efforts in the 21st century, including expansions to the city's airport, as well as the relocation of the Nebraska State Fair to Grand Island.

== Geography ==
According to the United States Census Bureau, the city has a total area of 28.55 square miles (73.94 km^{2}), of which 28.41 square miles (73.58 km^{2}) is land and 0.14 square miles (0.36 km^{2}) is water.

Grand Island is located just a few miles north of the Platte River, one of Nebraska's most prominent rivers on which many of the state's major cities and towns sit.

== Metropolitan area ==
The Grand Island Metropolitan Statistical Area consists of Hall, Hamilton, Howard, and Merrick counties. Hamilton was added to the metropolitan area in 2012. The Grand Island MSA is home to 76,479 people (2023 estimate), making it one of the smallest in the United States.

=== Climate ===
Climate data for Grand Island, Nebraska (Central Nebraska Regional Airport), 1991–2020 normals, (Note: Mean monthly maxima and minima (i.e. the highest and lowest temperature readings during an entire month or year) calculated based on data at said location from 1991 to 2020.) extremes 1895–present
Month	Jan	Feb	Mar	Apr	May	Jun	Jul	Aug	Sep	Oct	Nov	Dec	Year
Record high °F (°C)	76 (24)	80 (27)	98 (37)	98 (37)	104 (40)	108 (42)	117 (47)	112 (44)	109 (43)	97 (36)	88 (31)	80 (27)	117 (47)
Mean maximum °F (°C)	59.8 (15.4)	65.1 (18.4)	76.8 (24.9)	85.8 (29.9)	92.3 (33.5)	97.7 (36.5)	99.9 (37.7)	97.5 (36.4)	94.3 (34.6)	86.3 (30.2)	74.0 (23.3)	61.3 (16.3)	101.7 (38.7)
Mean daily maximum °F (°C)	36.1 (2.3)	40.4 (4.7)	52.6 (11.4)	63.3 (17.4)	73.4 (23.0)	84.4 (29.1)	88.1 (31.2)	85.8 (29.9)	79.3 (26.3)	65.6 (18.7)	51.1 (10.6)	38.9 (3.8)	63.2 (17.3)
Daily mean °F (°C)	25.9 (−3.4)	29.7 (−1.3)	40.7 (4.8)	51.0 (10.6)	62.0 (16.7)	72.8 (22.7)	77.0 (25.0)	74.6 (23.7)	66.6 (19.2)	53.1 (11.7)	39.6 (4.2)	28.9 (−1.7)	51.8 (11.0)
Mean daily minimum °F (°C)	15.6 (−9.1)	19.1 (−7.2)	28.8 (−1.8)	38.6 (3.7)	50.5 (10.3)	61.1 (16.2)	65.8 (18.8)	63.5 (17.5)	53.9 (12.2)	40.6 (4.8)	28.1 (−2.2)	18.9 (−7.3)	40.4 (4.7)
Mean minimum °F (°C)	−6.8 (−21.6)	−2.2 (−19.0)	8.1 (−13.3)	22.2 (−5.4)	34.7 (1.5)	47.5 (8.6)	54.0 (12.2)	51.3 (10.7)	37.5 (3.1)	22.7 (−5.2)	9.9 (−12.3)	−1.8 (−18.8)	−11.9 (−24.4)
Record low °F (°C)	−29 (−34)	−34 (−37)	−21 (−29)	−1 (−18)	22 (−6)	36 (2)	42 (6)	38 (3)	20 (−7)	6 (−14)	−11 (−24)	−26 (−32)	−34 (−37)
Average precipitation inches (mm)	0.61 (15)	0.74 (19)	1.39 (35)	2.52 (64)	4.70 (119)	4.01 (102)	3.51 (89)	3.20 (81)	2.00 (51)	1.99 (51)	1.10 (28)	0.84 (21)	26.61 (676)
Average snowfall inches (cm)	6.8 (17)	7.3 (19)	3.8 (9.7)	1.6 (4.1)	0.0 (0.0)	0.0 (0.0)	0.0 (0.0)	0.0 (0.0)	0.1 (0.25)	1.1 (2.8)	2.3 (5.8)	4.7 (12)	27.7 (70)
Average precipitation days (≥ 0.01 in)	5.5	5.6	7.0	8.9	11.6	10.2	9.1	8.5	6.8	6.5	4.9	5.3	89.9
Average snowy days (≥ 0.1 in)	4.6	4.3	2.4	1.0	0.1	0.0	0.0	0.0	0.0	0.6	1.6	3.5	18.1
Source: NOAA

=== Environmental issues ===
In 1981, a plume of contaminated groundwater was discovered beneath the Cornhusker Army Ammunition Plant, which occupies 20 square miles (52 km^{2}) west of Grand Island. The plume extended northeast of the plant and migrated towards Grand Island. Hazardous level of RDX and TNT were discovered, remnants of the explosives produced at the plant during various wars. In 1987, the Army burned about 40,000 tons of explosives-contaminated soil. In 1998, a pump-and-treat facility that continues to operate was built to cycle contaminated water through an explosives residue-removal system. The Army injected "hot spots" of contamination substances to curtail the contamination. As of 2014, TNT and RDX were still present. Construction of a primary water detention cell for flood control has been delayed by the slow cleanup.

== Demographics ==
Historical population
Census	Pop.	Note	%±
1870	1,057		—
1880	2,963		180.3%
1890	7,536		154.3%
1900	7,554		0.2%
1910	10,326		36.7%
1920	13,947		35.1%
1930	18,041		29.4%
1940	19,130		6.0%
1950	22,682		18.6%
1960	25,742		13.5%
1970	32,358		25.7%
1980	33,180		2.5%
1990	39,386		18.7%
2000	42,940		9.0%
2010	48,520		13.0%
2020	53,131		9.5%
2023 (est.)	52,622		−1.0%
U.S. Decennial Census

=== 2020 census ===
As of the 2020 census, Grand Island had a population of 53,131, 19,981 households, and 12,983 families. The population density was 1,765.7 per square mile (681.9/km^{2}).

The median age was 35.1 years. 27.5% of residents were under the age of 18 and 14.6% of residents were 65 years of age or older. For every 100 females there were 99.5 males, and for every 100 females age 18 and over there were 97.1 males age 18 and over.

99.8% of residents lived in urban areas, while 0.2% lived in rural areas.

Of the 19,981 households, 34.8% had children under the age of 18 living in them. Of all households, 44.8% were married-couple households, 19.6% were households with a male householder and no spouse or partner present, and 27.2% were households with a female householder and no spouse or partner present. About 29.2% of all households were made up of individuals and 11.4% had someone living alone who was 65 years of age or older. The average household size was 2.6 and the average family size was 3.1.

There were 21,068 housing units, of which 5.2% were vacant. The homeowner vacancy rate was 1.2% and the rental vacancy rate was 5.7%.

Racial composition as of the 2020 census
Race	Number	Percent
White	34,970	65.8%
Hispanic or Latino (of any race)	18,238	34.3%
Some other race	9,205	17.3%
Two or more races	5,491	10.3%
Black or African American	1,876	3.5%
American Indian and Alaska Native	859	1.6%
Asian	695	1.3%
Native Hawaiian and Other Pacific Islander	35	0.1%

=== Income ===
The 2016–2020 5-year American Community Survey estimates show that the median household income was $56,513 (with a margin of error of +/- $3,441) and the median family income $66,755 (+/- $4,142). Males had a median income of $37,579 (+/- $2,047) versus $29,532 (+/- $1,595) for females. The median income for those above 16 years old was $33,197 (+/- $1,293). Approximately, 9.3% of families and 11.8% of the population were below the poverty line, including 16.6% of those under the age of 18 and 10.2% of those ages 65 or over.

=== 2010 census ===
As of the census of 2010, there were 48,520 people, 18,326 households, and 11,846 families living in the city. The population density was 1,707.8 inhabitants per square mile (659.4/km^{2}). There were 19,426 housing units at an average density of 683.8 per square mile (264.0/km^{2}). The racial makeup of the city was 80.0% White, 2.1% African American, 1.0% Native American, 1.2% Asian, 0.2% Pacific Islander, 13.1% from other races, and 2.4% from two or more races. Hispanic or Latino people of any race were 26.7% of the population.

There were 18,326 households, of which 35.4% had children under the age of 18 living with them, 47.5% were married couples living together, 12.0% had a female householder with no husband present, 5.2% had a male householder with no wife present, and 35.4% were non-families. 29.1% of all households were made up of individuals, and 11.2% had someone living alone who was 65 years of age or older. The average household size was 2.59 and the average family size was 3.20.

The median age in the city was 34.7 years. 27.6% of residents were under the age of 18; 8.7% were between the ages of 18 and 24; 26.7% were from 25 to 44; 23.9% were from 45 to 64; and 13% were 65 years of age or older. The gender makeup of the city was 49.8% male and 50.2% female.

=== 2000 census ===
As of the census of 2000, there were 42,940 people, 16,426 households, and 11,038 families living in the city. The population density was 2,000.2 inhabitants per square mile (772.3/km^{2}). There were 17,421 housing units at an average density of 811.5 per square mile (313.3/km^{2}). The racial makeup of the city was 86.72% White, 0.42% African American, 0.33% Native American, 1.31% Asian, 0.17% Pacific Islander, 9.64% from other races, and 1.42% from two or more races. Hispanic or Latino people of any race were 15.94% of the population.

There were 16,426 households, out of which 34.3% had children under the age of 18 living with them, 53.0% were married couples living together, 10.4% had a female householder with no husband present, and 32.8% were non-families. 27.1% of all households were made up of individuals, and 11.1% had someone living alone who was 65 years of age or older. The average household size was 2.55 and the average family size was 3.09.

In the city, the population was spread out, with 27.0% under the age of 18, 9.5% from 18 to 24, 28.6% from 25 to 44, 20.8% from 45 to 64, and 14.1% who were 65 years of age or older. The median age was 35 years. For every 100 females, there were 98.1 males. For every 100 females aged 18 and over, there were 96.0 males.

The median income for a household in the city was $36,044, and the median income for a family was $43,197. Males had a median income of $28,925 versus $20,521 for females. The per capita income for the city was $17,071. About 9.9% of families and 12.8% of the population were below the poverty line, including 16.7% of those under age 18 and 8.1% of those aged 65 or over.

== Arts and culture ==
=== Nebraska State Fair ===
In 2010, Grand Island became the home of the Nebraska State Fair. Each year, the fair attracts thousands of people to the city, with a record attendance of over 300,000 in 2024.

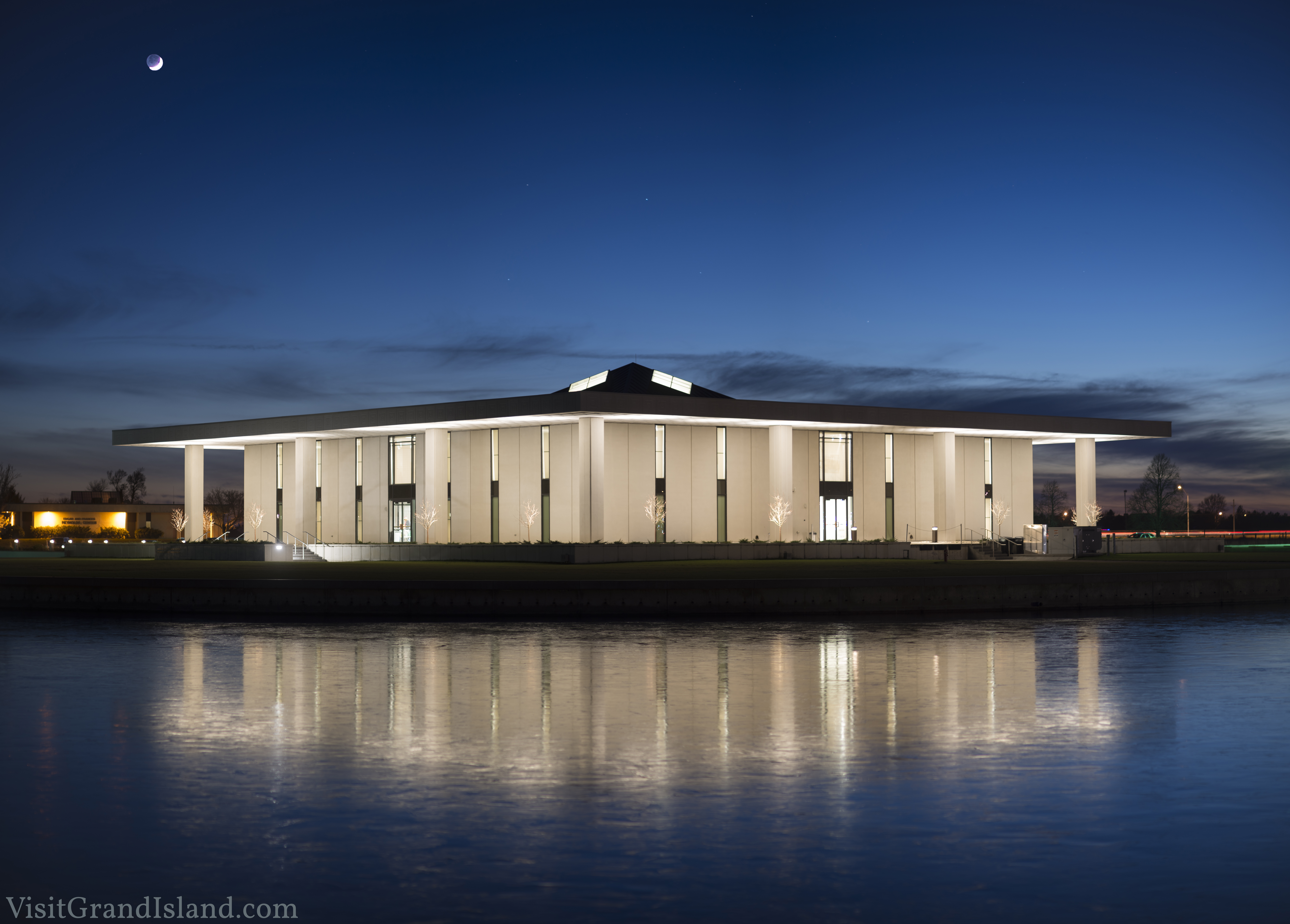
Exterior of the Stuhr Museum

=== Stuhr Museum ===
The Stuhr Museum, also known as the Museum of the Prairie Pioneer, is a museum located in southwestern Grand Island. The museum houses over 140,000 artifacts from early settlers in central Nebraska, and features a living history village called Railroad Town. Railroad Town is designed to evoke an 1890s-era prairie village and made up of many original period structures moved to the museum.

== Parks and recreation ==
There are several parks located within Grand Island. The most prominent of these include Stolley Park, and the George Clayton Hall County Park.

== Government ==
Grand Island has a mayor–council government. The mayor and a ten-member city council are elected in nonpartisan elections. Two members are elected from each of the city's five wards to staggered four-year terms. At the most recent mayoral election, incumbent Mayor Roger G. Steele was re-elected to a second term.

== Infrastructure ==
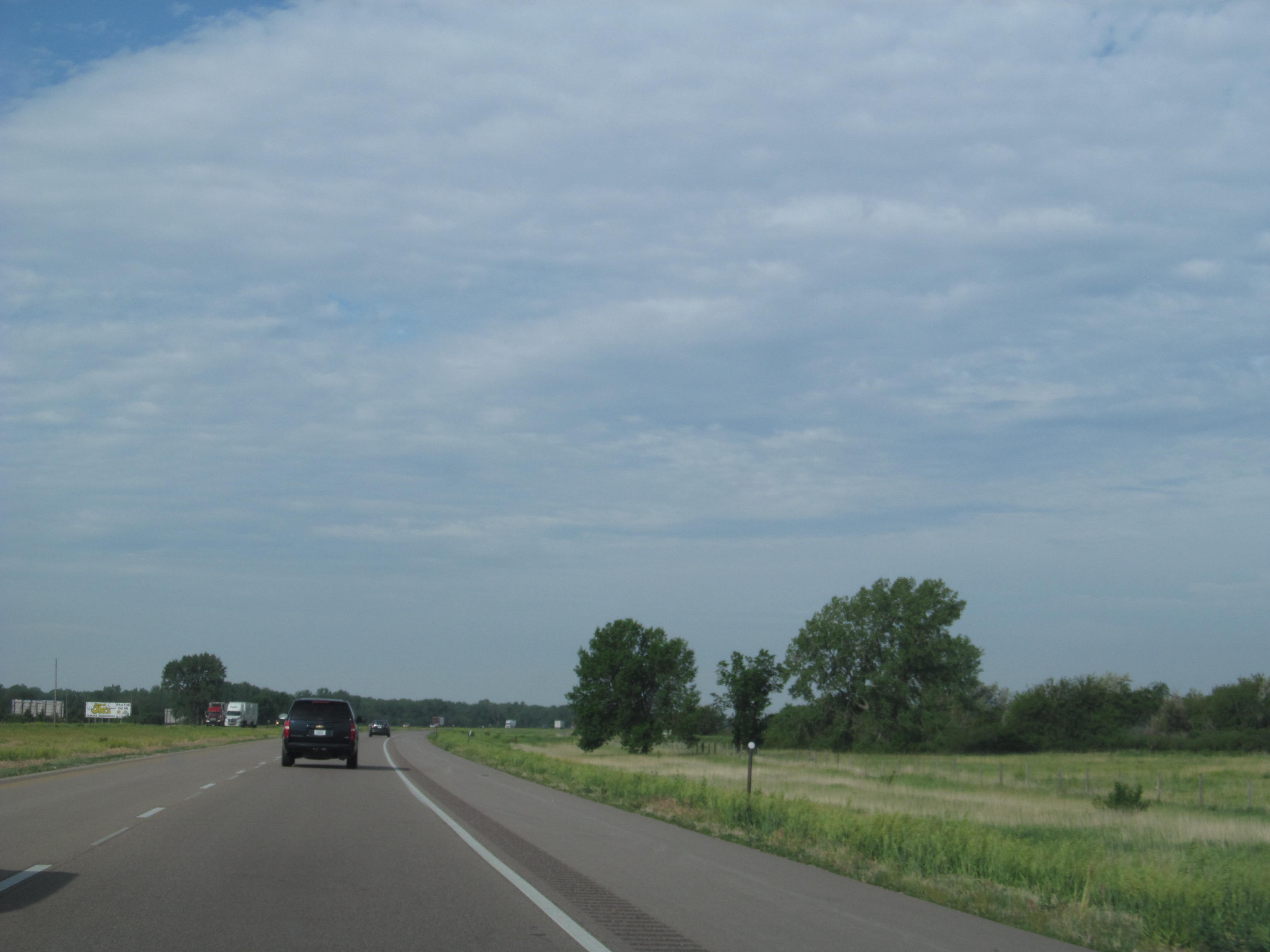
Interstate 80 near Grand Island

=== Transportation ===
==== Major highways ====
Interstate 80 is located 4 miles (6 km) south of Grand Island. U.S. Route 281 is the main north-south route in the city, running through the city's west edge south to Hastings, and north to O'Neill. U.S. Route 30 runs east-west through the center of Grand Island.

==== Railways ====
Located on the route of the first transcontinental railroad, Grand Island is a major freight rail hub with more than 140 freight trains per day passing through the city on lines operated by Union Pacific, BNSF, and the Nebraska Central Railroad.

==== Airport ====
Central Nebraska Regional Airport is located in Grand Island. On September 4, 2008, Allegiant Air began nonstop service from Grand Island to Las Vegas, Nevada. In June 2011, American Eagle Airlines began providing service to Dallas/Fort Worth, Texas, twice daily.

==== Local Transportation ====
Intercity buses operated by Burlington Trailways and Express Arrow serve Grand Island.

The city's transit system is entirely demand-responsive, with rides requiring reservation 24 hours in advance. As of 2023, Grand Island is the largest city in Nebraska without fixed-route public transit. Fixed route service was studied, but not recommended, in the GO Grand Island Transit 2023 Transit Development Plan.

Grand Island also sports a total of fifteen traffic circles, many of which are near each other. This system allows for particularly efficient through-traffic while sacrificing speed and barring transportation to some locations by certain, longer vehicles. Of these fifteen recorded roundabouts, fourteen are designated "official," while one is reportedly an "unofficial" insertion into the Grand Island's public transportation network.

=== Hospitals ===
As of 2024, Grand Island is served by CHI Health St. Francis Hospital, with 153 beds.

The city is also served by Grand Island Regional Medical Center, which opened in 2020.

== Media ==
=== Radio stations ===
- KRGI (AM) 1430
- LA GRAN D 93.3
- KRGI-FM 96.5
- KRGY FM 97.3
- KKJK FM 103.1
- KSYZ-FM 107.7
- KMTY-FM 97.7/99.7

== Education ==
School districts

All of the municipality is in Grand Island Public Schools. Grand Island Senior High School is the comprehensive high school of that district.

Northwest Public Schools' facility, including, Northwest High School, is within the city limits of Grand Island. However, none of the district's taxation and attendance boundary covers any part of the city limits.

Private schools

- Central Catholic High School
- Heartland Lutheran High School

Colleges and universities

- Central Community College
- University of Nebraska at Kearney

== Notable people ==
- Edith Abbott, social worker
- Grace Abbott, helped draft the Social Security Act
- Rick Allen, NASCAR commentator for NBC Sports, later college football and professional bowling announcer for CW Sports
- Parnelia Augustine, painter
- Bil Baird, puppeteer
- Mike Bockoven, author
- Dick Cavett, former television talk show host
- Bo Evans, computer pioneer
- Joe Feeney, tenor on The Lawrence Welk Show
- Henry Fonda, Academy Award-winning film actor
- Channing Hill, jockey
- Thomas Mangelsen, Wildlife Photographer
- George J. Marrett, member Nebraska Aviation Hall of Fame, test pilot and author
- G. P. Mix, two-time lieutenant governor of Idaho
- Gertrude Nafe, teacher, essayist
- John Parrella, former NFL player
- John Pedersen, arms designer
- Tom Rathman, former NFL player
- Rebecca Richards-Kortum, bioengineering professor and MacArthur Fellow
- Jeff Richardson, baseball player
- Eve Ryder, artist
- William Henry Thompson, former U.S. Senator from Nebraska
- Edgar A. Wedgwood, sheriff of Hall County, Nebraska and adjutant general of the Utah National Guard
- Simeon Burt Wolbach, pathologist

== See also ==
- List of municipalities in Nebraska
- Impact of the 2019–20 coronavirus pandemic on the meat industry in the United States
- Grand Island FCC Monitoring Station
