= KHAQ =

Radio station in Maxwell–North Platte, Nebraska

- Maxwell, Nebraska; United States
- Broadcast area: North Platte, Nebraska
- Frequency: 98.5 MHz
- Branding: 98.5 The Hawk

Programming
- Format: Classic rock
- Affiliations: Waitt Radio Networks

Ownership
- Owner: Armada Media - Mccook, Inc.
- Sister stations: KODY, KXNP

History
- First air date: February 23, 2000
- Former call signs: KJKI (2000–2000); KRKU (2000–2008)

Technical information
- Licensing authority: FCC
- Facility ID: 86863
- Class: C1
- ERP: 100,000 watts
- HAAT: 113 meters
- Transmitter coordinates: 41°12′49″N 100°43′49″W

Links
- Public license information: Public file; LMS
- Webcast: Listen Live
- Website: huskeradio.com

KHAQ (98.5 FM) is a radio station broadcasting a Classic rock format. Licensed to Maxwell, Nebraska, United States, the station is currently owned by Armada Media - Mccook, Inc and features programming from Waitt Radio Networks.

== History ==
The station was assigned the call letters KJKI on 2000-02-23. On 2000-08-30, the station changed its call sign to KRKU. On 2008-08-11, the station changed its call sign to the current KHAQ.
