= KUVR (AM) =

Radio station in Holdrege, Nebraska

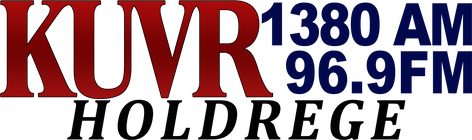
- Holdrege, Nebraska; United States
- Frequency: 1380 kHz
- Branding: KUVR 1380 & 96.9

Programming
- Format: Classic hits

Ownership
- Owner: Nebraska Rural Radio Association
- Sister stations: KRVN

History
- First air date: October 22, 1956; 69 years ago

Technical information
- Licensing authority: FCC
- Facility ID: 27178
- Class: D
- Power: 500 watts day; 62 watts night
- Transmitter coordinates: 40°26′26.00″N 99°24′0.00″W
- Translator: 96.9 K245CK (Holdrege)

Links
- Public license information: Public file; LMS
- Webcast: Listen live
- Website: ruralradio.com/kuvr/

KUVR (1380 AM) is a radio station broadcasting a classic hits music format. Licensed to Holdrege, Nebraska, United States, the station is currently owned by Nebraska Rural Radio Association.

== History ==
KUVR was founded by Bill and Betty Rae Whitlock and went on the air October 22, 1956. It has occupied the same building in downtown Holdrege since 1958, which was previously occupied by Northwestern Bell Telephone Co. In 1971, an FM station was added, KUVR-FM (later separated from KUVR, now KMTY).

== Ownership ==
In May 2013, Armada Media traded KUVR and KMTY to Legacy Broadcasting in exchange for stations in Scottsbluff and North Platte. The transaction was consummated on October 11, 2013, with Legacy's purchase price pegged at $800,000.

Effective January 17, 2020, Legacy Communications sold KUVR, translator K245CK, and six sister stations to Nebraska Rural Radio Association for $1.75 million.
