= KXNP =

- North Platte, Nebraska; United States
- Broadcast area: North Platte
- Frequency: 103.5 MHz

Programming
- Format: Country music
- Affiliations: Westwood One

Ownership
- Owner: NRG License Sub, LLC

Technical information
- Licensing authority: FCC
- Facility ID: 9934
- Class: C1
- ERP: 100,000 watts
- HAAT: 146.0 meters
- Transmitter coordinates: 41°12′49.00″N 100°43′48.00″W

Links
- Public license information: Public file; LMS
- Website: www.huskeradio.com

KXNP (103.5 FM) is a radio station broadcasting a country music format. Licensed to North Platte, Nebraska, United States, the station serves the North Platte area. The station is currently owned by Armada Media.

== Previous Logo ==
KXNP celebrated 25 years on the air in 2007.

25th anniversary
