= Mass media in Lincoln, Nebraska =

Lincoln is a major media center in Nebraska. The following is a list of outlets based in media serving the Lincoln metropolitan area in the city.

== Print ==
=== Newspapers ===
The Lincoln Journal Star is the city's primary newspaper, published daily. Other newspapers published in Lincoln include:

- Clocktower, Union College student paper
- Daily Nebraskan, University of Nebraska–Lincoln student paper, daily
- The Dailyer Nebraskan, University of Nebraska–Lincoln satirical student paper, bi-weekly

== Radio ==
In its Fall 2013 ranking of radio markets by population, Arbitron ranked Lincoln 168th in the United States. Due to Lincoln's proximity to Omaha, local listeners can also receive the signal of several radio stations broadcasting from the Omaha radio market.

Lincoln radio stations gets 21 Analog FM stations, 5 Digital HD Radio FM stations including 6 subchannels Like HD-2 and HD-3, 3 Analog AM stations, and No Digital HD Radio AM stations in this Lincoln Metro area.

The following is a list of radio stations licensed to and/or broadcasting from Lincoln:

=== AM ===
AM radio stations
Frequency	Callsign	HD	Name	Format	City of License	Owner	Notes
1240	KFOR	No	KFOR FM 101.5 & 1240 AM	News/Talk	Lincoln, Nebraska	Alpha Media	Translator of (K268DF FM)
1400	KLIN	Repeats on KBBK HD-3	News/Talk 1400 AM	News/Talk	Lincoln, Nebraska	NRG Media	-
1480	KLMS	No	Mix 103.3	Adult hits	Lincoln, Nebraska	Alpha Media	Translator of (K277CA FM)

=== FM ===
FM radio stations
Frequency	Callsign	HD	Name	Format	City of License	Owner	Notes
88.5	KLCV	No	Bott Radio Network	Religious	Lincoln, Nebraska	Bott Broadcasting Company	BRN
89.3	KZUM	1	Community Radio	World; Variety	Lincoln, Nebraska	Sunrise Communications, Inc.	-
90.3	KRNU	No	Where New Music Beings	Indie; Alternative Rock	Lincoln, Nebraska	University of Nebraska–Lincoln	College radio
91.1	KUCV	2	Nebraska Public Media/NPR	Public	Lincoln, Nebraska	Nebraska Public Media Foundation	NPR
91.9	K220GT	No	K-Love	Christian Contemporary	Lincoln, Nebraska	Educational Media Foundation	K-LOVE
92.9	KTGL	No	The Eagle 92.9	Classic Rock	Beatrice, Nebraska	Alpha Media	Broadcasts from Lincoln
93.7	KNTK	No	93.7 The Ticket	Sports	Firth, Nebraska	BDP Communications LLC	Broadcasts from Lincoln
94.5	K233AN	No	Red 94.5	Top 40	Lincoln, Nebraska	NRG Media	Simulcast of KBBK-HD2
95.1	KRKR	No	My Bridge Radio	Christian Contemporary	Waverly, Nebraska	My Bridge Radio	Broadcasts from Lincoln
96.9	KZKX	No	KX 96.9	Country	Seward, Nebraska	Alpha Media	Broadcasts from Lincoln
97.3	KDPP	No	97.3 The Source	Urban contemporary	Lincoln, Nebraska	The Source	-
98.1	KFGE	No	Froggy 98	Country	Milford, Nebraska	NRG Media	Broadcasts from Lincoln
101.5	K268DF	No	KFOR FM 101.5 & 1240 AM	News/Talk	Lincoln, Nebraska	Alpha Media	Rebroadcasts KFOR AM
103.3	K277CA	No	Mix 103.3	Adult hits	Lincoln, Nebraska	Alpha Media	Rebroadcasts KLMS AM
104.1	KIBZ	No	104.1 The Blaze	Active Rock	Crete, Nebraska	Alpha Media	Broadcasts from Lincoln
104.9	KTMX	2	104.9 Max Country	Country	York, Nebraska	Nebraska Rural Radio Association	Broadcasts from Lincoln
105.3	KLNC	No	105.3 The Bone	Classic Rock	Lincoln, Nebraska	NRG Media	-
106.3	KFRX	3	106.3 KFRX	Top 40	Lincoln, Nebraska	Alpha Media	-
106.7	K294DJ	No	Boomer Radio	Oldies	Lincoln, Nebraska	Walnut Radio	Rebroadcasts Omaha's KIBM AM
107.3	KBBK	3	B107.3	Hot Adult Contemporary	Lincoln, Nebraska	NRG Media	-
107.9	KJTM-LP	No	TiM FM	Positive Hits; Contemporary Christian	Lincoln, Nebraska	Duo Ministries	Translator of K255CS (98.9 FM)

== Television ==
Lincoln is a principal city of the Lincoln-Hastings-Kearney television market. The market includes the central portion of Nebraska as well as several counties in north-central Kansas. Due to Lincoln's proximity to Omaha, local viewers can also receive the signal of most television stations broadcasting in the Omaha television market.

The following is a list of television stations that broadcast from and/or are licensed to the city.

Lincoln TV stations gets 5 Full-powered Digital channels including 20 subchannels and 2 Low-powered Digital channels including 2 subchannels.

Television stations in the Lincoln Metro area (Ascending order)
Virtual Ch. ATSC	Call	City	Owner	Start	Digital Ch. RF	DTV HD	Nickname	Programming
4.1	KSNB	York	Gray Television	1965 (until license moved to York in 2022)	24	720p	Local 4 News	NBC
4.2	KSNB	York	Gray Television	1965 (until license moved to York in 2022)	24	480i	MeMyTV	MeTV; MyNetworkTV
4.3	KSNB	York	Gray Television	1965 (until license moved to York in 2022)	24	480i	ION	Ion Television
4.5	KSNB	York	Gray Television	1965 (until license moved to York in 2022)	24	480i	Oxygen	Oxygen True Crime
4.6	KSNB	York	Gray Television	1965 (until license moved to York in 2022)	24	480i	OUT	Outlaw
8.1	KLKN	Lincoln	Standard Media	1964	8, 35	1080i	Channel 8 Eyewitness News	ABC
8.2	KLKN	Lincoln	Standard Media	1964	8, 35	480i	GRIT	Grit
8.3	KLKN	Lincoln	Standard Media	1964	8, 35	480i	Mystery	Ion Mystery
8.4	KLKN	Lincoln	Standard Media	1964	8, 35	480i	Laff	Laff
8.5	KLKN	Lincoln	Standard Media	1964	8, 35	480i	Defy	Defy TV
8.6	KLKN	Lincoln	Standard Media	1964	8, 35	720p	Bounce	Bounce
10.1	KOLN	Lincoln	Gray Television	1953	10	1080i	10/11 Now	CBS
10.2	KOLN	Lincoln	Gray Television	1953	10	480i	StartTV	Start TV
10.3	KOLN	Lincoln	Gray Television	1953	10	480i	CourtTV	Court TV
10.4	KOLN	Lincoln	Gray Television	1953	10	480i	H & I	H&I
10.5	KOLN	Lincoln	Gray Television	1953	10	480i	Circle	Circle
10.6	KOLN	Lincoln	Gray Television	1953	10	480i	TCN	True Crime Network
12.1	KUON; NEB PUBLIC MEDIA	Lincoln	Nebraska Public Media Foundation	1954	12	1080i	NE-PBS	PBS
12.2	KUON; NEB PUBLIC MEDIA	Lincoln	Nebraska Public Media Foundation	1954	12	1080i	NE-W	World
12.3	KUON; NEB PUBLIC MEDIA	Lincoln	Nebraska Public Media Foundation	1954	12	720p	NE-C	Create
12.4	KUON; NEB PUBLIC MEDIA	Lincoln	Nebraska Public Media Foundation	1954	12	480i	NE-KIDS	PBS Kids
12.5	KUON; NEB PUBLIC MEDIA	Lincoln	Nebraska Public Media Foundation	1954	12	480i	NE-FNX	FNX
18.1	KCWH-LD	Lincoln	Gray Television	1988	18	720p	The CW Nebraska	CW
18.3	KCWH-LD	Lincoln	Gray Television	1988	18	1080i	KOLN HD	CBS (Simulcast of KOLN-HD)
27.1	KFDY-LD (simulcast of KOHA-LD)	Lincoln	Flood Communications of Omaha LLC	1992	34	1080i	Telemundo Nebraska	Telemundo
27.2	KFDY-LD (simulcast of KOHA-LD)	Lincoln	Flood Communications of Omaha LLC	1992	34	720p	NCN-S	News Channel Nebraska (Ind.)
51.1	KFXL	Lincoln	Sinclair Broadcast Group	2006	15	720p	FOX Nebraska	Fox
51.2	KFXL	Lincoln	Sinclair Broadcast Group	2006	15	480i	ROAR	Roar
51.3	KFXL	Lincoln	Sinclair Broadcast Group	2006	15	480i	Charge!	Charge
