= NAB Crystal Radio Awards =

Annual radio awards for community service

NAB Crystal Radio Awards logo

The NAB Crystal Radio Awards are presented annually by the National Association of Broadcasters to American radio stations. The award was established in 1987 to recognize radio stations for year-round commitment to community service.

Finalists for the Crystal Radio Award are selected by a panel of judges representing broadcasting, community service organizations, and public relations firms. Selected from a pool of 50 finalists, 10 stations are selected for the award honoring their efforts to improve the quality of life in their respective communities. The NAB Crystal Radio Award winners are announced during the Radio Luncheon held at the annual NAB Show in Las Vegas. Each year's radio inductee into the NAB Broadcasting Hall of Fame is also honored at this luncheon.

The National Association of Broadcasters is a trade association that promotes the interests of American radio and television stations plus a number of associate and international broadcaster members. Founded in 1922, the NAB represents more than 8,300 terrestrial radio and television stations as well as several major broadcast networks.

== Past winners ==
2008
KCVM, (Cedar Falls, Iowa) · KFOR, (Lincoln, Nebraska) · KSTZ, (Des Moines, Iowa) · KUZZ-FM, (Bakersfield, California) · WAWZ, (Zarephath, New Jersey) · WDRV (Chicago) · WIZM, (La Crosse, Wisconsin) · WJBC, (Bloomington, Illinois) · WUBE-FM (Cincinnati) · WUGO-FM, (Grayson, Kentucky)

2007
KBHP, (Bemidji, Minnesota) · KHHT-FM (Los Angeles) · KLGR, (Redwood Falls, Minnesota) · KOA (Denver) · KSTP-FM, (Saint Paul, Minnesota) · KTAR, (Phoenix, Arizona) · WFYR-FM, (Peoria, Illinois) · WJJY-FM, (Brainerd, Minnesota) · WTAM (Cleveland) · WUSL-FM (Philadelphia)

2006
KLVI, (Beaumont, Texas) · KOZT-FM, (Fort Bragg, California) · KSL (Salt Lake City), KUDL-FM, (Kansas City, Missouri) · KUZZ-FM, (Bakersfield, California) · KZBR-FM (San Francisco) · WHAI-FM, (Greenfield, Massachusetts) · WHUR-FM, (Washington, D.C.) · WILV-FM (Chicago) · WJON, (St. Cloud, Minnesota)

2005
KBBX-FM, (Omaha, Nebraska) · KLOS-FM (Los Angeles) · KNOM, (Nome, Alaska) · KOIT (San Francisco) · WCMT, (Martin, Tennessee) · WJBC, (Bloomington, Illinois) · WLEN-FM, (Adrian, Michigan) · WTMX-FM (Chicago) · WTOP, (Washington, D.C.) · WUGO-FM, (Grayson, Kentucky)

2004
KDFC-FM (San Francisco) · KFOG (San Francisco) · KFOR, (Lincoln, Nebraska) · KSTP-FM (Minneapolis) · KSTZ-FM, (Des Moines, Iowa) · KTCZ-FM (Minneapolis) · WDEL, (Wilmington, Delaware) · WDRV (Chicago) · WLUP-FM (Chicago) · WSYR, (Syracuse, New York)

2003
KFME-FM (now KCJK), (Kansas City, Missouri) · KNOM, (Nome, Alaska) · KOIT (San Francisco) · KOZT-FM, (Fort Bragg, California) · KPRS-FM, (Kansas City, Missouri) · KVAK, (Valdez, Alaska) · WGMS, (Washington, D.C.) · WIBC (Indianapolis) · WJJY-FM, (Brainerd, Minnesota) · WUGO-FM, (Grayson, Kentucky)

2002
KABC, (Los Angeles) · KIRO (Seattle) · KNCO, (Grass Valley, California) · KPAM, (Portland, Oregon) · KUDL-FM, (Kansas City, Missouri) · KWJJ-FM, (Portland, Oregon) · WJON, (St. Cloud, Minnesota) · WLQT-FM, (Dayton, Ohio) · WTCB-FM, (Columbia, South Carolina) · WTMX-FM (Chicago)

2001
KELO-FM, (Sioux Falls, South Dakota) · KNX (Los Angeles) · KUZZ-AM-FM, (Bakersfield, California) · KZQZ-FM (now KGMZ-FM), (San Francisco) · WENS (Indianapolis) · WJJY-FM, (Brainerd, Minnesota) · WLEN, (Adrian, Michigan) · WPEG, (Charlotte, North Carolina) · WRAL, (Raleigh, North Carolina) · WUSL (Philadelphia)

2000
KDWB-FM (Minneapolis) · KNOM-AM/FM, (Nome, Alaska) · KSDR-FM, (Watertown, South Dakota) · KVFD, (Fort Dodge, Iowa) · WDSN, (DuBois, Pennsylvania) · WGMS-FM, (Washington, D.C.) · WICO-FM, (Salisbury, Maryland) · WJBC, (Bloomington, Illinois) · WTMX (Chicago) · WZZK-FM, (Birmingham, Alabama)

1999
KBHP, (Bemidji, Minnesota) · KBHR, (Big Bear City, California) · KLOS-FM (Los Angeles) · KSL (Salt Lake City) · KUDL, (Westwood, Kansas) · KUEL, (Fort Dodge, Iowa) · KZLA-FM (now KXOS), (Los Angeles) · WGOH, (Grayson, Kentucky) · WHUR-FM, (Washington, D.C.) · WYTZ/WZTY (now WCSY-FM), (St. Joseph, Michigan)

1998
KDWB-FM (Minneapolis) · KIRO (Seattle) · KUZZ-AM/FM, (Bakersfield, California) · KVFD, (Fort Dodge, Iowa) · KWSN, (Sioux Falls, South Dakota) · WIBC (Indianapolis) · WKVI-AM/FM, (Knox, Indiana) · WLEN, (Adrian, Michigan) · WUSL (Philadelphia) · WUSY, (Chattanooga, Tennessee)

1997
KBHP, (Bemidji, Minnesota) · KKBT-FM (now KKLQ), (Los Angeles) · KMAS, (Shelton, Washington) · KMBZ, (Kansas City, Kansas) · KWOA, (Worthington, Minnesota) · WJLS-FM, (Beckley, West Virginia) · WKLX, (Rochester, New York) · WLTE (Minneapolis) · WMMX, (Dayton, Ohio) · WSM, (Nashville, Tennessee)

1996
KCUE, (Red Wing, Minnesota) · KIRO (Seattle) · KOEL, (Oelwein, Iowa) · KSDR-FM, (Watertown, South Dakota) · WBEE-FM, (Rochester, New York) · WOKO, (South Burlington, Vermont) · WQCB, (Brewer, Maine) · WRAL-FM, (Raleigh, North Carolina) · WSYR, (Syracuse, New York) · WUSL (Philadelphia)

1995
KBIG-FM (Los Angeles) · KFGO, (Fargo, North Dakota) · KGO (San Francisco) · KKCS-FM (now KXWA), (Colorado Springs, Colorado) · KPRS, (Kansas City, Kansas) · KQRS (now KDIZ)/KQRS-FM (Minneapolis) · KZZY, (Devils Lake, North Dakota) · WEAS-FM, (Savannah, Georgia) · WPSK-FM, (Pulaski, Virginia) · WVPO, (Stroudsburg, Pennsylvania)

1994
KBHP, (Bemidji, Minnesota) · KLBJ, (Austin, Texas) · KPSN-FM (now KMXP), (Phoenix, Arizona) · KSJN-FM, (Saint Paul, Minnesota) · WWTC (Minneapolis) · KCBS (San Francisco) · KOJM, (Havre, Montana) · KRMG, (Tulsa, Oklahoma) · WCCO (Minneapolis) · WXYV-FM (now WQSR), (Baltimore)

1993
KASE-FM, (Austin, Texas) · KNNN, (Central Valley, California) · KQRS (now KDIZ)/KQRS-FM (Minneapolis) · KRLD (Dallas) · KZZY, (Devils Lake, North Dakota) · WGN (Chicago) · WLNG, (Sag Harbor, New York) · WTTR, (Westminster, Maryland) · WUSL (Philadelphia) · WZWW, (State College, Pennsylvania)

1992
KGO (San Francisco) · KIRO (Seattle) · KMEL-FM (San Francisco) · KPQX, (Havre, Montana) · KQEG, (La Crosse, Wisconsin) · KTMT)/KTMT-FM, (Medford, Oregon) · WFOB, (Bowling Green, Ohio) · WLVQ, (Columbus, Ohio) · WOKQ, (Dover, New Hampshire) · WRGA, (Rome, Georgia)

1991
KENI, (Anchorage, Alaska) · KFOR, (Lincoln, Nebraska) · KIHX-FM (now KPPV), (Prescott Valley, Arizona) · KLOS (Los Angeles) · KMIT, (Mitchell, South Dakota) · KOMC, (Branson, Missouri) · KRGI, (Grand Island, Nebraska) · KROE, (Sheridan, Wyoming) · WBZ (Boston) · WOJO (Chicago)

1990
KTTX/KWHI, (Brenham, Texas) · WAKR, (Akron, Ohio) · WDLB, (Marshfield, Wisconsin) · WHBC/WHBC-FM, (Canton, Ohio) · WHIZ/WHIZ-FM, (Zanesville, Ohio) · WILM, (Wilmington, Delaware) · WPXC, (Hyannis, Massachusetts) · WSJM, (St. Joseph, Michigan) · WTSN, (Dover, New Hampshire) · WYAY (now WAKL)/WYAI (now WALR-FM), (Atlanta)

1989
KABC (Los Angeles) · KNCO/KNCO-FM, (Grass Valley, California) · KSEN, (Shelby, Montana) · WCTC, (New Brunswick, New Jersey) · WDBC, (Escanaba, Michigan) · WGST (Atlanta) · WJON, (St. Cloud, Minnesota) · WLBK, (DeKalb, Illinois) · WSM, (Nashville, Tennessee) · WTLC (Indianapolis)

1988
KTNN, (Window Rock, Arizona) · KVON, (Napa, California) · WAGE, (Leesburg, Virginia) · WBAL (Baltimore) · WBEL, (Beloit, Wisconsin) · WKKR/WZMG (now WTLM), (Auburn, Alabama) · WMT, (Cedar Rapids, Iowa) · WTMJ (Milwaukee) · WTRE, (Greensburg, Indiana) · WWVA, (Wheeling, West Virginia)

1987
KNOM, (Nome, Alaska) · KPAL (now KZTS), (Little Rock, Arkansas) · WMAL (now WSBN), (Washington, D.C.) · WQBA/WQBA-FM, (Miami) · WFMD, (Frederick, Maryland) · KJMO/KWOS, (Jefferson City, Missouri) · KMOX, (St. Louis, Missouri) · KHAS, (Hastings, Nebraska) · KGFW, (Kearney, Nebraska) · WVMT, (Colchester, Vermont)

== NAB Crystal Heritage Award ==
The NAB Crystal Heritage Award is presented to a station that has won five Crystal Radio Awards, demonstrating a long-term commitment to community service. In 2007, WUSL ("Power 99FM", Philadelphia, Pennsylvania) was the first station in history to reach this milestone. WUSL was presented the Crystal Heritage Award at the 2008 Radio Luncheon in April 2008.

== See also ==
- NAB Marconi Radio Awards, honoring America's top radio stations and personalities
- NAB National Radio Award, awarded to an outstanding individual leader in the radio industry
- List of radio awards
