= KLMS =

Radio station in Lincoln, Nebraska

- Lincoln, Nebraska; United States
- Broadcast area: Lincoln metropolitan area
- Frequency: 1480 kHz

Ownership
- Owner: Alpha Media; (Alpha 3E Licensee LLC)
- Sister stations: KFOR; KFRX; KIBZ; KTGL; KZKX

History
- First air date: October 24, 1949
- Last air date: December 10, 2024
- Former call signs: KLMS (1948–1990); KFMQ (1990–1993); KMEM (1993–1997)

Technical information
- Facility ID: 54708
- Class: B
- Power: 1,000 watts (day); 750 watts (night)
- Transmitter coordinates: 40°47′45.6″N 96°34′56.24″W
- Translator: 103.3 K277CA (Lincoln)

KLMS (1480 AM) was a commercial radio station licensed to Lincoln, Nebraska, United States, which broadcast from 1949 until 2024. Last owned by Alpha Media, it formerly had an adult hits format as "Mix 103.3," the branding derived from former translator relay K277CA (103.3 FM). KLMS transmitted from a site in far east Lincoln, near Walton, Nebraska.

KLMS began broadcasting on October 24, 1949, and in its early years offered programs from the Liberty Broadcasting System and Mutual Broadcasting System. It switched to a full-time adult contemporary format in 1959 and became Lincoln's highest-rated radio station. In 1974, founder Howard A. Shuman sold KLMS to Telegraph-Herald, Inc., which expanded to FM in 1979 by buying KFMQ (101.9 FM). The adult contemporary format had shifted to oldies by the mid-1980s, when it was replaced by an unsuccessful new-age music format. After Midwest Communications bought the station in 1988, it returned the station to oldies before dropping separate programming for a simulcast of KFMQ in 1990. From 1993 to 1997, the station broadcast big band music under the KMEM call sign.

KMEM flipped to sports in 1997 and reclaimed the heritage KLMS call sign. For most of the next 26 years, it aired sports talk from various distributors, primarily ESPN Radio. In 2023, the station switched to adult hits. Citing the loss of its site, KLMS left the air on December 10, 2024, and its license was surrendered a year later under Connoisseur Media, who acquired Alpha during the interregnum. Its translator kept Mix in service by switching to an HD Radio subchannel of KFRX.

== History ==
=== Early years ===
On June 28, 1946, the Lincoln Broadcasting Corporation applied to build a new radio station in Lincoln, to broadcast on 1480 kHz day and night with 1,000 watts. The corporation was headed by Howard A. Shuman, formerly of KFOR; Shuman had helped put that station on the air from David City in 1924. The application was granted on October 16, 1947, and the company began work on a five-tower array for transmitting. With independent programming, KLMS took to the air on October 24, 1949. Its programming emphasized music as well as local news and sports, though the station also had an affiliation with the short-lived Liberty Broadcasting System. Ownership and programming remained stable in the early years; Shuman acquired majority control of the company in 1960, while the Mutual Broadcasting System was added the next year. Those two changes coincided with a turn in KLMS's fortunes. For its first decade, the station had maintained a block programming format—a "department store of radio," as one later manager put it—but the implementation of a new adult contemporary-type format in 1959 turned KLMS into Lincoln's top station in 1960.

Shuman sold the station he had helped build 25 years prior to Telegraph-Herald, Inc., of Dubuque, Iowa, in 1974; the newspaper owned two other stations in the Midwest. Five years later, Telegraph-Herald purchased KFMQ (101.9 FM) from its general manager, Steve Agnew. Telegraph-Herald, Inc., became Woodward Communications in 1981, in a move to clarify the division between the newspaper and its parent company. Under Woodward, the station implemented directional daytime broadcasting from a full new transmitter site at 98th and A streets. Completed in 1983, the $500,000 site featured eight towers which were used in different configurations during the day and at night. In 1985, KLMS and KFMQ moved into the same offices, having never shared studio space despite being commonly owned for six years. By that time, KLMS's adult contemporary format had drifted to oldies.

=== A bad "Breeze," oldies revival and format flips in the 1990s ===
In November 1986, Woodward Communications fired KLMS station manager Lee Thomas, who had been associated with the station since 1959 and had been program director for most of the previous 20 years. That decision turned out to have a direct effect on KLMS. Thomas joined with three other investors, all former KLMS-KFMQ employees, to buy struggling Lincoln-area FM station KJUS and relaunched it as oldies-formatted KLDZ in March 1987. KLDZ quickly captured significant audience share in the Lincoln market; though officials insisted that it was not due to the new competition, KLMS exited the oldies format in October and flipped to "The Breeze," a new-age music format fed by the Progressive Music Network of Minneapolis; it was the second station to take the service.

Woodward sold its Lincoln stations to Midwest Communications for $2.8 million in 1988. Midwest nearly immediately flipped KLMS back to oldies; the new-age format had been a failure, dropping the station's audience share from 4.9 percent to 0.7 percent in just six months, and advertisers had lost interest. The oldies revival, however, failed to recover listenership: it ended on November 14, 1990, when the poorly rated AM outlet switched to a simulcast of KFMQ and adopted the KFMQ call letters.

In 1993, a format hole opened abruptly in the market when KHAT (1530 AM), which played big band music, signed off at the end of April when its owner sold the transmitter site property for development and opted not to rebuild the station elsewhere. In response, KFMQ picked up the big band format and became KMEM on June 16, promoting itself as "Your Memory Music Station." The same week KHAT shut down, Midwest sold KFMQ to Radio One Nebraska, Inc., a company headed by Raymond Lamb, for $200,000.

=== Going sports ===
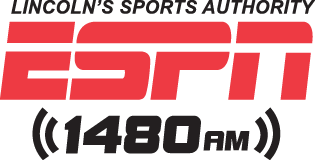
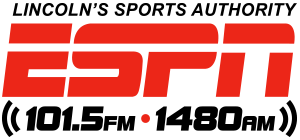
Logos as an ESPN Radio affiliate.

Lamb sold 10 stations, including two in Lincoln, to Three Eagles Communications for a total of $6.9 million in July 1996. Two months later, Three Eagles bought KFRX (102.7 FM) and KFOR, giving it a four-station cluster in the Lincoln market. After initially promising no format changes, KMEM added two talk shows—Imus in the Morning and Nanci Donellan ("The Fabulous Sports Babe")—in February 1997. It was the prelude to a full-on format flip to sports that May, with a lineup of mostly national talk programs—including The Jim Rome Show—and overnight programming from One on One Sports, reclaiming its heritage KLMS call letters. In December 2000, KLMS switched networks from One on One Sports to ESPN Radio.

Between 1997 and 2023, KLMS had only deviated from sports talk radio once. In January 2010, Three Eagles opted to return to an oldies format on the station for the first time in nearly three decades, attempting to capitalize on the heritage of KLMS in the 1960s and 1970s. Poor listener response to the removal of the sports talk format led Three Eagles to announce a month later that it would reinstate KLMS as it was prior to the switch.

After an FM station, KNTK (93.7 FM), announced it would flip to sports, KLMS—until then the only station in the format in Lincoln—responded by adding local programming to its lineup in afternoon drive.

Three Eagles was purchased by Digity in 2014 in a $66.5 million transaction encompassing 48 stations. Two years later, Digity and its 116 stations were acquired by Alpha Media for $264 million.

=== Return to music and shutdown ===
At midnight on February 15, 2023, KLMS dropped the sports format and began simulcasting KFOR; on the same date, KFOR began simulcasting on KLMS's FM translator K268DF (101.5 FM). The next day, KLMS flipped to adult hits, branded as "Mix 103.3", and began simulcasting on translator K277CA (103.3 FM), which formerly relayed KFOR. The station suffered storm damage and was at reduced power for a month, but on December 10, 2024, KLMS left the air, with Alpha citing "loss of its antenna site" as the reason. "Mix" continued on air, fed by the second HD Radio subchannel of KFRX. Alpha was acquired by Connoisseur Media in 2025; KLMS never returned to the air, and its license was surrendered for cancellation on December 10, 2025, with the FCC doing so the next day.
