= KNCO =

KNCO may refer to:

- KNCO (AM), a radio station (830 AM) licensed to Grass Valley, California, United States
- KNCO-FM, a radio station (94.1 FM) licensed to Grass Valley, California, United States
