= WPCH =

WPCH may refer to:

- WPCH (AM), a radio station (1310 AM) licensed to serve West Point, Georgia, United States
- WPCH-TV, a television station (channel 31, virtual 20) licensed to serve Atlanta, Georgia
- WIHB-FM, a radio station (96.5 FM) licensed to serve Gray, Georgia, which held the call sign WPCH from 2006 to 2015
- WUBL (FM), a radio station (94.9 FM) licensed to serve Atlanta, Georgia, which used the call signs WPCH or WPCH-FM until March 2003
- WNRR, a radio station (1380 AM) licensed to serve North Augusta, South Carolina, United States, which used the call sign WPCH from March 2003 to November 2006
