= WKKR =

- Auburn, Alabama; United States
- Broadcast area: Lee County, Alabama; Columbus, Georgia
- Frequency: 97.7 MHz
- Branding: 97.7 The Kicker

Programming
- Format: Country
- Affiliations: Premiere Networks

Ownership
- Owner: iHeartMedia, Inc.; (iHM Licenses, LLC)
- Sister stations: WCJM-FM, WMXA, WPCH, WTLM, WZMG

History
- First air date: July 8, 1968
- Former call signs: WFRI (1968–1985); WKKR-FM (1985-?)
- Call sign meaning: Kicker

Technical information
- Licensing authority: FCC
- Facility ID: 22875
- Class: A
- ERP: 3,100 watts horizontal; 16,000 watts vertical
- HAAT: 138 meters (453 ft)
- Transmitter coordinates: 32°33′54″N 85°22′13″W

Links
- Public license information: Public file; LMS
- Webcast: Listen Live
- Website: kickerfm.iheart.com

WKKR (97.7 FM) is a radio station licensed to Auburn, Alabama, United States. The station, established in 1968, is currently owned by San Antonio–based iHeartMedia, through licensee iHM Licenses, LLC. In 1988, WKKR became the first Alabama radio station to earn the National Association of Broadcasters Crystal Radio Award for outstanding commitment to community service.

== History ==
New radio station WFRI began broadcasting on July 8, 1968, with 860 watts of power on 97.7 MHz licensed to Faulkner Radio, Inc. Owner James H. Faulkner Sr. also owned several other Alabama radio stations as well as the newspapers Baldwin Times and Foley Onlooker in Baldwin County, Alabama. Broadcasting a middle of the road music radio format, the station upgraded its signal strength to 3,000 watts of effective radiated power in 1970. In 1973, the station switched to a "solid gold" oldies and adult standards music format. By 1979, WFRI had changed musical directions again and was programming a Top 40 pop music format. This change would also prove short-lived as WFRI aired a classic rock format branded as "Rock 97" for most of the early 1980s.

In November 1984, Faulkner Radio, Inc., made a deal to sell WFRI and AM station WAOA (now WTLM) to Fuller Broadcasting Company, Inc. The deal was approved by the FCC on January 7, 1985, and the transaction was consummated on March 18, 1985.

The AM station's format was flipped from country music to oldies and WFRI's format was switched from the "97 Rock" classic rock format to a country music format branded as "Kicker FM". New owner Fuller Broadcasting had the Federal Communications Commission assign current call letters WKKR to match the branding on March 1, 1985 .

In August 1998, Fuller Broadcasting Company, Inc., reached an agreement to sell this station to Root Communications License Company, L.P., as part of a five-station deal. The deal was approved by the FCC on October 5, 1998, and the transaction was consummated in December 1998. Gary Fuller, president and CEO of Fuller Broadcasting Company, Inc. from 1985 until he sold the company in December 1998, was elected mayor of Opelika, Alabama, in August 2004.

In March 2003, Root Communications License Company, L.P., reached an agreement to sell this station to Qantum Communications subsidiary Qantum of Auburn License Company, LLC, as part of a 26 station deal valued at $82.2 million. The deal was approved by the FCC on April 30, 2003, and the transaction was consummated on July 2, 2003.

On May 15, 2014, Qantum Communications announced that it would sell its 29 stations, including WKKR, to Clear Channel Communications (now iHeartMedia), in a transaction connected to Clear Channel's sale of WALK AM-FM in Patchogue, New York to Connoisseur Media via Qantum. The transaction was consummated on September 9, 2014.

== Awards and honors ==
In 1988, WKKR and AM sister station WZMG (now WTLM) became the first stations in Alabama to earn the National Association of Broadcasters Crystal Radio Award. Established in 1987, the NAB Crystal Radio Awards recognize broadcasters for outstanding commitment to community service.

WKKR is continuously chosen as "Best Of" in the local "OA News" and was awarded the 2008 "National Promotion of Year" Award from the Country Radio Seminar in Nashville, Tennessee.

== Notable alumni ==
- Marc Chase, now working for Tribune Company as the President of Tribune Interactive, began his broadcasting career as a disc jockey at several Auburn area stations, including WFRI.

Tige And Daniel Show nationally syndicated radio program. Hosts began their broadcasting careers at WKKR and WMXA.
