= Tige and Daniel Show =

Tige And Daniel Show
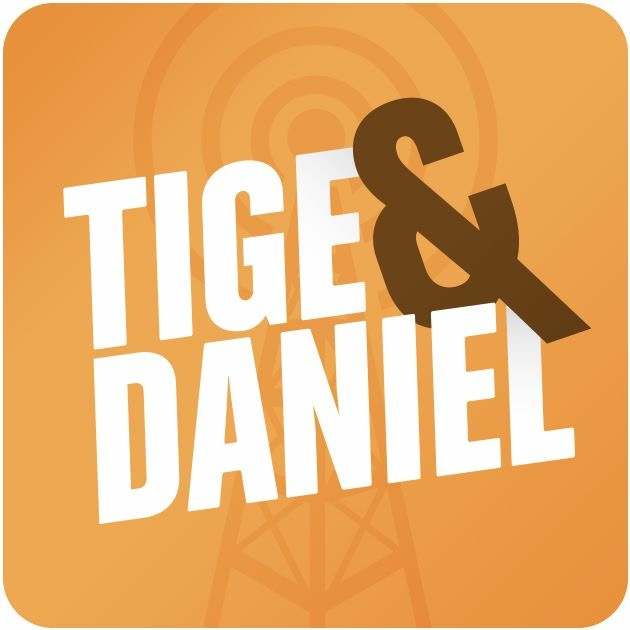
- Genre: Comedy, talk, music
- Running time: 4 hours (including commercials)
- Country of origin: United States
- Home station: WSIX
- Starring: Tige Rodgers, Daniel Baker
- Created by: Frank Osborn, Jimmy Feuger
- Produced by: Mari Mueller (executive producer)
- Original release: 2010

The Tige And Daniel Show is a CRS/CA award-winning, ACM and CMA nominated American radio show that was broadcast throughout the United States including Atlanta, New Orleans, Milwaukee, Sacramento, Hartford, Omaha and internationally on IHeartRadio "New Country" channel. As of 2018, the show originated from the IHeartRadio studio located next to Jason Aldean's Kitchen and Rooftop Bar on lower Broadway in Nashville which is open to public to view broadcast.

== History ==
The Tige And Daniel Show is hosted by Tige Rodgers and Daniel Baker, who met soon after graduation from Auburn University while hosting airshifts at WMXA in Auburn, AL. The duo had aimed to host a show together and did so when they moved to Myrtle Beach, SC in 2010 to host mornings on country station WGTR. The show was briefly syndicated in 2012 before the duo left to accept the morning show position in Greensboro, NC at WTQR. In 2015, the Tige and Daniel Show relocated to Nashville to generate a version of the show to air in markets across the United States

In 2020, Tige & Daniel returned to morning radio when they accepted a job at KVOO known now as 98-5 The Bull. Listeners are hoping that Daniel Baker will return his alter-ego "Pigface" to the show at some point.

== About ==
The show has been described by the hosts as a mix of "Music, talk and attempted comedy." The show is best known for signature bits like "Sensual Shoutouts", "Me So Corny" and "Tiny Couch Interviews" in which Tige and Daniel interview stars such as Darius Rucker, Luke Bryan, Kellie Pickler and Dierks Bentley on a couch made for only two but all three are made to squeeze in. In one notable "Tiny Couch Interview" country star Brantley Gilbert, who had been upset at the line of questions he was being asked, said "If I hear one more stupid ass question, I'm gonna whip both your asses, ya hear me?" to a shocked and horrified Tige and Daniel. It was later revealed to be a prank played on Tige And Daniel by Brantley Gilbert.

== Awards ==
| Year | Association | Category | Result |
|---|---|---|---|
| 2010 | Alabama Broadcaster's Association | Best Morning Show | Won |
| 2013 | CMA-Country Music Association | Personality Of The Year | Nominated |
| 2016 | Country Radio Seminar/Country Aircheck | Show Of The Year | Won |
| 2017 | CMA-Country Music Association | Personality Of The Year | Nominated |
| 2019 | Country Radio Seminar/Country Aircheck | Personality Of The Year | Nominated |
| 2019 | ACM-Academy of Country Music | Personality Of The Year | Nominated |
