= KHAT (Nebraska) =

Lincoln, Nebraska; United States
- Frequency: 1530 kHz

Ownership
- Owner: Tate Broadcasting, Inc.

History
- First air date: December 21, 1965; 59 years ago
- Last air date: April 30, 1993; 31 years ago
- Former call signs: KLOL (1966–1968); KECK (1968–1986)

Technical information
- Power: 5,000 watts (daytime only)
- Transmitter coordinates: 40°43′31″N 96°39′02″W

KHAT was a radio station broadcasting on 1530 AM in Lincoln, Nebraska, United States. It was last operated by Tate Broadcasting and programmed with an adult standards format.

The 1530 frequency served Lincoln for 27 years. It closed in April 1993 when the final operator decided to sell the land for real estate development, though it was sold twice as part of package deals with other Lincoln-area stations before the license was deleted in early 1997.

== History ==
A group of four men doing business as the Lancaster County Broadcasting Company obtained a construction permit to build a new radio station in Lincoln on May 1, 1963, to operate with 5,000 watts using a directional antenna. Construction began later that year on the station, which took the call sign KNBE before opting for KLOL. Lincoln listeners would have to wait a while to hear their new station, however; it did not begin broadcasting until December 21, 1965, airing a format aimed at a female audience.

After the death of one of the owners, Merlin J. Meythaler, in 1967, KLOL was sold to J-P Enterprises, Inc., headed by Jim Treat and Pole Early, in 1968. By the time of the sale, it had switched to a country format. When J-P took over, it retained the country format but adopted the callsign KECK. February 24, 1973, brought the launch of a new station, KHAT-FM 106.3, which broadcast a "champagne country" approach to country music and later a "progressive country" format, with an emphasis on "outlaw" style country music.

In 1986, after Early's death, his family and Treat announced the sale of KECK and KHAT-FM (which had by that point switched to adult contemporary) to TM Communications, Inc., of Dallas. The two Lincoln stations, purchased for $1,025,000, were the company's first broadcast stations, but the firm had a long track record as a supplier of syndicated music formats and jingles—including the music used by KECK for the preceding four years. After the sale was announced, Norman Fischer and Associates, a media brokerage house based in Austin, Texas, sued, claiming that the firm had put J-P in touch with TM but that TM then conspired to deny the company its commission. KHAT's adult contemporary format began to be simulcast on both frequencies. Two years after the deal occurred, Pat Shaughnessy, head of TM's broadcast division, exited the company and took the stations with him to form Marathon Broadcasting, paying $7.1 million for the Lincoln duo and outlets in Reno, Nevada, and Mobile, Alabama.

Tate Communications of Harlingen, Texas, purchased the KHAT stations in 1990 and broke up the simulcast. The FM remained adult contemporary but adopted new call letters as KMXA. KHAT AM, meanwhile, took on a big band music format, utilizing the "Stardust" syndicated network; a local talk show hosted by station manager Cathy Fife was added in 1992. This continued until Tate opted to sell the land used by KHAT's transmitter facility in 1993. As a result, the station ceased broadcasting on April 30; its big band format was kept alive in Lincoln by 1480 AM, which became KMEM in June.

1530 AM in Lincoln never broadcast again, but the license was sold twice. Rock Steady, Inc., acquired the former KMXA, which now bore the callsign KIBZ, early in 1993; it then paid $500 to purchase the KHAT license. Rock Steady then filed to sell its Lincoln cluster first to a company owned by Kraig G. Fox in 1995, but this sale fell through, and Triathlon Broadcasting stepped in to make the purchase of the three stations in 1996. Triathlon, however, was up against the clock: the Telecommunications Act of 1996 had introduced a new one-year time limit for a station to be silent, and the cost of rebuilding the five-tower array necessary for KHAT's directional pattern caused the company not to pursue the project.
