= Wlen =

Wlen may refer to:

- Wleń, a town in western Poland
- WLEN, a radio station licensed to Adrian, Michigan, United States
