= WCJM-FM =

- West Point, Georgia; United States
- Frequency: 100.9 MHz
- Branding: The Bull

Programming
- Format: Country
- Affiliations: Westwood One

Ownership
- Owner: iHeartMedia, Inc.; (iHM Licenses, LLC)
- Sister stations: WKKR; WMXA; WPCH; WTLM; WZMG

History
- First air date: July 18, 1966
- Former call signs: WBMK-FM (CP, 1963–1966); WCJM (1966–1994)

Technical information
- Licensing authority: FCC
- Facility ID: 54863
- Class: A
- ERP: 5,800 watts
- HAAT: 100 meters (330 ft)
- Transmitter coordinates: 32°51′7″N 85°8′14″W

Links
- Public license information: Public file; LMS
- Webcast: Listen live (via iHeartRadio)
- Website: wcjmthebull.iheart.com

WCJM-FM (100.9 FM) is a radio station licensed to serve West Point, Georgia, United States. The station is owned by San Antonio–based iHeartMedia, through licensee iHM Licenses, LLC.

It broadcasts a country music format and features programming from Westwood One.

== History ==
In August 1998, Fuller Broadcasting Company, Inc., agreed to sell this station to Root Communications License Company, L.P., as part of a five-station deal.

In March 2003, Root Communications License Company, L.P., reached an agreement to sell this station to Qantum Communications subsidiary Qantum of Auburn License Company, LLC, as part of a 26 station deal valued at $82.2 million. The deal was approved by the Federal Communications Commission on April 30, 2003, and the transaction was consummated on July 2, 2003.

On May 15, 2014, Qantum Communications announced that it would sell its 29 stations, including WCJM-FM, to Clear Channel Communications (now iHeartMedia), in a transaction connected to Clear Channel's sale of WALK AM-FM in Patchogue, New York, to Connoisseur Media via Qantum. The transaction was consummated on September 9, 2014.
