= WZMG =

Radio station in Pepperell, Alabama, US

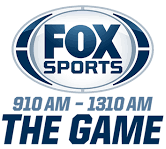
- Pepperell, Alabama; United States
- Broadcast area: Auburn-Opelika, Alabama
- Frequency: 910 kHz
- Branding: Fox Sports 910 AM - 1310 AM The Game

Programming
- Format: Sports
- Affiliations: Fox Sports Radio; Crimson Tide Sports Network

Ownership
- Owner: iHeartMedia, Inc.; (iHM Licenses, LLC)
- Sister stations: WCJM-FM; WKKR; WMXA; WPCH; WTLM

History
- First air date: October 1, 1979
- Former call signs: WTXN (1979–1991); WDAK (1991–1994); WTLM (1994–1997)
- Call sign meaning: "Magic" (former branding)

Technical information
- Licensing authority: FCC
- Facility ID: 24255
- Class: D
- Power: 650 watts (day); 56 watts (night)
- Transmitter coordinates: 32°39′26″N 85°25′27″W
- Repeater: 1310 WPCH (West Point)

Links
- Public license information: Public file; LMS
- Webcast: Listen live (via iHeartRadio)
- Website: foxsportsthegame.iheart.com

WZMG (910 AM) is a radio station broadcasting a sports radio format. Licensed to Pepperell, Alabama, United States, the station serves the Auburn Metropolitan Area. The station is owned by San Antonio–based iHeartMedia, through licensee iHM Licenses, LLC. WZMG is a Fox Sports Radio affiliate and features some programming from Westwood One.

== History ==
In August 1998, Fuller Broadcasting Company, Inc., reached an agreement to sell this station to Root Communications License Company, L.P., as part of a five-station deal. The deal was approved by the Federal Communications Commission (FCC) on October 5, 1998, and the transaction was consummated in December 1998. Gary Fuller, president and CEO of Fuller Broadcasting Company from 1985 until he sold the company in December 1998, was elected mayor of Opelika, Alabama, in August 2004.

In March 2003, Root Communications License Company, L.P., reached an agreement to sell this station to Qantum Communications subsidiary Qantum of Auburn License Company, LLC, as part of a 26 station deal valued at $82.2 million. The deal was approved by the FCC on April 30, 2003, and the transaction was consummated on July 2, 2003.

Logo as "The Touch"

On May 15, 2014, Qantum Communications announced that it would sell its 29 stations, including WZMG, to Clear Channel Communications (now iHeartMedia), in a transaction connected to Clear Channel's sale of WALK AM-FM in Patchogue, New York, to Connoisseur Media via Qantum. The transaction was consummated on September 9, 2014.

On December 15, 2015, WZMG dropped its previous "InTouch 910" urban adult contemporary programming from Westwood One's The Touch and changed its format to gospel, branded as "Hallelujah 910" and using iHeartMedia's internal Premium Choice service. On July 1, 2019, WZMG replaced "Hallelujah" with sports programming from Fox Sports Radio, branded as "Fox Sports 910 AM - 1310 AM The Game" in reflection of its simulcast with WPCH (1310 AM) in West Point, Georgia.
