= KLNC =

Radio station in Lincoln, Nebraska

- Lincoln, Nebraska; United States
- Broadcast area: Lincoln metropolitan area
- Frequency: 105.3 MHz
- Branding: 105.3 The Bone

Programming
- Format: Mainstream rock

Ownership
- Owner: NRG Media (sale to Connoisseur Media pending); (NRG License Sub, LLC)
- Sister stations: KBBK; KFGE; KLIN

History
- First air date: February 3, 1922
- Former call signs: KXGH (1990–1992, CP); KFGE (1992–1996); KKUL (1996–2005)

Technical information
- Licensing authority: FCC
- Facility ID: 58730
- Class: A
- ERP: 3,200 watts
- HAAT: 138 meters (453 ft)
- Transmitter coordinates: 40°43′38.00″N 96°36′51.00″W

Links
- Public license information: Public file; LMS
- Webcast: Listen live
- Website: www.1053thebone.com

KLNC (105.3 FM, "The Bone") is a radio station broadcasting a mainstream rock format. Licensed to Lincoln, Nebraska, United States, the station serves the Lincoln metropolitan area. Studios are located at Broadcast House at 44th Street and East O Street in Lincoln, while its transmitter is located at the master antenna farm at South 84th Street and Yankee Hill Road in the southeast part of the city.

The station is currently owned by NRG Media, which purchased the station from Triad Broadcasting in August 2007.

== History ==
On February 3, 1992, KLNC signed on as KFGE, "Froggy 105.3", and airing a country music format. Froggy moved to another new-build station, 98.1 FM, on July 15, 1996, and 105.3 became oldies-formatted "Kool 105.3", KKUL. On August 29, 2005, KKUL would change call letters to KLNC and shift to classic hits, first as "Linc FM", and then, in December 2007, as "105.3 WOW-FM".

On March 19, 2020, after a few days of stunting, KLNC flipped to classic rock as "105.3 The Bone". The format change puts the station in direct competition with KTGL.

In March 2026, it was announced that NRG Media would sell its Lincoln cluster to Connoisseur Media.
