= WTLM =

- Opelika, Alabama; United States
- Broadcast area: Auburn, Alabama; Columbus, Georgia
- Frequency: 1520 kHz
- Branding: Hallelujah 1520 AM

Programming
- Format: Urban gospel
- Affiliations: Citadel Media

Ownership
- Owner: iHeartMedia, Inc.; (iHM Licenses, LLC)
- Sister stations: WCJM-FM, WKKR, WMXA, WPCH, WZMG

History
- First air date: August 12, 1968
- Former call signs: WAOA (1968–1985); WZMG (1985–1997)

Technical information
- Licensing authority: FCC
- Facility ID: 22876
- Class: D
- Power: 1,000 watts day 650 watts critical hours
- Transmitter coordinates: 32°39′26″N 85°25′27″W

Links
- Public license information: Public file; LMS
- Webcast: Listen Live
- Website: hallelujah1520am.iheart.com

WTLM (1520 AM) is an urban gospel radio station licensed in Opelika, Alabama, United States. The station is owned by San Antonio–based iHeartMedia, through licensee iHM Licenses, LLC. 1520 AM is a United States clear-channel frequency, on which WWKB and KOKC share Class A status.

== Programming ==
WTLM broadcasts an urban gospel music format to the Auburn Metropolitan Area which once featured programming from Citadel Media. WTLM broadcasts Auburn Tigers football games. The entire lineup is made up of voice-tracked personalities which include Kim Harper-Johnson (M-F, 12-6am and Weekends, 12-6am and 12-6pm), Richard LaGrand (M-F, 6-10am), Tracy Bethea (M-F, 10am-3pm), Sonya Blakey (M-F, 3-7pm and ), Victor Sosa (M-F, 7pm-12am and Saturdays, 6am-12pm, and 6pm-12am )

== History ==
Licensed to Faulkner Radio, Inc., WAOA signed on the air August 12, 1968, as a daytime-only station with 5,000 watts of power at 1520 kHz. Owner James H. Faulkner Sr. also owned several other Alabama radio stations as well as the newspapers Baldwin Times and Foley Onlooker in Baldwin County, Alabama. WAOA signed on with a Middle-Of-The-Road music format which changed to Country/Western in summer 1969. This was maintained until the completion of the 1985 sale to Faulkner Radio.

In November 1984, Fuller Broadcasting Company, Inc., made a deal to purchase WAOA and FM sister station WFRI (now WKKR) from Faulkner Radio, Inc. The deal was approved by the FCC on January 7, 1985, and the transaction was consummated on March 17, 1985. In February 1985, the AM station's format was flipped from country music to "solid gold" oldies. To match the new direction for the station, the callsign was changed to WZMG on March 1, 1985. On March 21, 1997, the station swapped callsigns with 910 kHz sister station WTLM (now WZMG) and was assigned the current WTLM call letters by the FCC.

In August 1998, Fuller Broadcasting Company, Inc., reached an agreement to sell this station to Root Communications License Company, L.P., as part of a five-station deal. The deal was approved by the FCC on October 5, 1998, and the transaction was consummated in December 1998. Gary Fuller, president and CEO of Fuller Broadcasting Company from 1985 until he sold the company in December 1998, was elected mayor of Opelika, Alabama, in August 2004.

In March 2003, Root Communications Group LP (Daniel C. Savadove, CEO) subsidiary Root Communications License Company, L.P., reached an agreement to sell this station to Qantum Communications, Inc. (Frank Osborn, partner) subsidiary Qantum of Auburn License Company, LLC, as part of a 26 station deal valued at $82.2 million. The deal was approved by the FCC on April 30, 2003, and the transaction was consummated on July 2, 2003. At the time of the sale, WTLM aired a nostalgia music format branded as "Timeless 1520".

Later, the format was switched again, this time to a sports radio format serving the greater Auburn Metropolitan Area. In June 2009, the format reverted to the "Timeless 1520" nostalgia music format.

On May 15, 2014, Qantum Communications announced that it would sell its 29 stations, including WTLM, to Clear Channel Communications (now iHeartMedia), in a transaction connected to Clear Channel's sale of WALK AM-FM in Patchogue, New York to Connoisseur Media via Qantum. The transaction was consummated on September 9, 2014.

On June 30, 2014 WTLM changed their format from oldies to classic country, branded as "Classic Kicker Country 1520".

On June 12, 2020 WTLM changed their format from classic country to urban gospel, branded as "Hallelujah 1520 AM".

== Awards and honors ==
In 1988, then-WZMG and sister station WKKR became the first stations in Alabama to earn the National Association of Broadcasters Crystal Radio Award for excellence in community service. Established in 1987, the NAB Crystal Radio Awards recognize broadcasters for outstanding commitment to community service.
