= KNOM =

Radio station in Nome, Alaska

Coordinates: 64°29′13.3″N 165°18′7.4″W

KNOM and KNOM-FM
- Nome, Alaska; United States
- Broadcast area: Western Alaska
- Frequencies: 780 kHz; 96.1 MHz
- Branding: KNOM

Programming
- Format: News, Regional, Country, Pop, Inspirational
- Affiliations: Westwood One

Ownership
- Owner: KNOM Radio Mission, Inc.

History
- First air date: July 14, 1971; 55 years ago
- Call sign meaning: K NOMe

Technical information
- Licensing authority: FCC
- Class: A
- Power: AM: 25,000 watts day 14,000 watts night (Class A)
- ERP: FM: 1,000 watts
- HAAT: -42 meters

Links
- Public license information: and KNOM-FM Public file; LMS
- Website: KNOM.org

KNOM (780 AM) and KNOM-FM (96.1 FM) are non-commercial Catholic radio stations in Nome, Alaska. The station owners and licensees are KNOM Radio Mission, Inc., a 501(c)3 nonprofit entity with seven board members. The FM signal has an effective radiated power (ERP) of 1,000 watts and covers the city of Nome and adjacent communities. KNOM AM 780 is considered a Class A station. By day, it transmits with 25,000 watts and can be heard as far north as Barter Island and as far south as the Alaska Peninsula, with regular coverage of approximately 100,000 square miles (260,000 km^{2}). With a good radio, it can be heard into the Russian Far East. At night, power is reduced to 14,000 watts.

In addition to its local news, weather, public affairs and religious programming, KNOM broadcasts a wide range of music in various formats. It also broadcasts some nationally syndicated programming, such as the Christian 20 The Countdown Magazine and the secular American Top 40: The 70s.

The station's newsroom is staffed by one full-time news director and one full-time reporter. An Associated Press member station since 1971, the station dropped its AP affiliation in 2014.

In April 2015, the station was awarded "Best Daily News Program, Radio" in Alaska by the Alaska Press Club.

== History ==
KNOM is the oldest Catholic radio station in the United States, and has been broadcasting in western Alaska for over five decades.

The idea for the station came from James Poole, S.J. While serving at the Jesuit mission in the village of St. Mary's in 1959, Poole created a makeshift "radio station" by wiring 30 homes with speakers linked to the public address system. He was reassigned to Nome in 1966, with fundraising for the station beginning in December of that year.

In 1970, Tom Busch, a young broadcast engineer, moved to Nome, becoming the chief engineer and eventually the station's general manager. After several years of work, Busch and a large team of volunteers gathered the money for the equipment, filled out paperwork with the Federal Communications Commission, built the station, and assembled its original broadcasting equipment. KNOM first went on the air on July 14, 1971. Busch was the general manager of KNOM for more than 30 years.

Poole left KNOM and Alaska in 1988 when he was reassigned to work in Tacoma, Washington. (Although not involved with the mission at that point, his name was used to thank donors into the late 1990s.) In 2004 the first of what would become dozens of allegations began to emerge of Poole's sexual abuse of Alaska Native women during his time in rural Alaska from the 1960s through the 1980s. Tom Busch personally mailed every person who had donated to the station, explaining that the allegations were true, and detailing the steps the station would make. For several years after, the station actively aired spots aimed at helping victims of sexual abuse.

By April 2005, Busch became development director and part-time engineer. Longtime program director and former volunteer Ric Schmidt became general manager. Tom was a past two-term president of the Alaska Broadcasters Association. Busch died on his 63rd birthday in November 2010 at his home in Anchorage, Alaska.

After the Diocese of Fairbanks declared bankruptcy in February 2008, Busch (until his passing) and Schmidt worked toward incorporating the radio station as a non-profit entity independent of the Catholic Bishop of Northern Alaska. In March 2010 the station emerged as a 501(c)3, under the name "KNOM Radio Mission, Inc.".

In 2019, after an article from the Center of Investigative Reporting described Poole being allowed to retire at the Gonzaga campus after his abuse became publicly known, KNOM's Board of Directors published a statement where they again renounce all of Poole's actions and commit to transparently carrying on with the mission of bringing news, inspiration, and encouragement to Western Alaska.

== Current operations ==
KNOM is able to operate from the dedication of full-time staff who live in Nome and Anchorage, where the business office is located. In the past, KNOM was operated primarily by volunteers who move to Nome and support the station in various ways as part of a year of service. Those volunteers lived in a volunteer house next door to the station building.

Currently, KNOM is staffed by paid local staff. People who are interested in public service or becoming a community DJ are encouraged to reach out to the station to volunteer.

== Awards and recognitions ==
KNOM has won several awards for community service from the National Association of Broadcasters (NAB). It received the Crystal Service award in 1987, 2000, 2003, 2005 and 2012. In 2013 it became the fourth radio station in the United States to receive the Crystal Heritage Award. The station has also won 19 Gabriel awards, as well as honors from the Catholic Academy for Communication Arts Professionals (CACAP), the Alaska Broadcasters Association (ABA), and other organizations.

KNOM has also received recognition from the State of Alaska, the City of Nome, and the Alaska National Guard.
