= WMXA =

FM radio station in Alabama, United States

- Opelika, Alabama; United States
- Broadcast area: Lee County–Auburn–Opelika, Alabama; Columbus, Georgia
- Frequency: 96.7 MHz
- Branding: Mix 96.7

Programming
- Format: Hot adult contemporary

Ownership
- Owner: iHeartMedia; (iHM Licenses, LLC)
- Sister stations: WCJM-FM; WKKR; WPCH; WTLM; WZMG

History
- First air date: 1991; 35 years ago
- Call sign meaning: "Mix Auburn"

Technical information
- Licensing authority: FCC
- Facility ID: 22877
- Class: A
- ERP: 3,500 watts
- HAAT: 131 meters (430 ft)
- Transmitter coordinates: 32°33′54″N 85°22′13″W

Links
- Public license information: Public file; LMS
- Webcast: Listen live (via iHeartRadio)
- Website: mix967online.iheart.com

WMXA (96.7 FM) is a radio station licensed to serve Opelika, Alabama. The station is owned by San Antonio–based iHeartMedia, through licensee iHM Licenses, LLC.

WMXA broadcasts a hot adult contemporary music format serving Lee County, Alabama, and Columbus, Georgia. The station's slogan is "Always #1 for Today's Best Music". WMXA consistently receives top awards for station and personalities, the latest coming in 2010 with The Tige Rodgers Morning Show being named "Best Small Market Morning Show" in the state of Alabama and WMXA along with the Zach Fox Morning Show being voted #1 "Best Of" Auburn-Opelika News.

== History ==
This station received its original construction permit for a new FM station broadcasting with 3,000 watts of effective radiated power on 96.7 MHz from the Federal Communications Commission on June 24, 1991; 35 years ago. The new station was assigned the call sign WMXA by the FCC on June 28, 1991.

In July 1991, while the station was still under construction, permit holder E.T. Communications, Inc., reached an agreement to transfer the permit to H&E Communications, a Partnership. The deal was approved by the FCC on August 20, 1991, and the transaction was consummated on August 21, 1991. WMXA received its license to cover from the FCC on March 6, 1992.

In July 1993, H&E Communications reached an agreement to sell this station to Fuller Broadcasting Company, Inc. The deal was approved by the FCC on October 18, 1993, and the transaction was consummated on November 30, 1993.

In August 1998, Fuller Broadcasting Company, Inc., reached an agreement to sell this station to Root Communications License Company, L.P., as part of a five-station deal. The deal was approved by the FCC on October 5, 1998, and the transaction was consummated in December 1998.

In March 2003, Root Communications License Company, L.P., reached an agreement to sell this station to Qantum Communications subsidiary Qantum of Auburn License Company, LLC, as part of a 26 station deal valued at $82.2 million. The deal was approved by the FCC on April 30, 2003, and the transaction was consummated on July 2, 2003.

On May 15, 2014, Qantum Communications announced that it would sell its 29 stations, including WMXA, to Clear Channel Communications (now iHeartMedia), in a transaction connected to Clear Channel's sale of WALK AM-FM in Patchogue, New York, to Connoisseur Media via Qantum. The transaction was consummated on September 9, 2014.
