= KFGE =

Radio station in Milford, Nebraska

- Milford, Nebraska; United States
- Broadcast area: Lincoln metropolitan area
- Frequency: 98.1 MHz
- Branding: Froggy 98

Programming
- Format: Country music
- Affiliations: Compass Media Networks

Ownership
- Owner: NRG Media (sale to Connoisseur Media pending); (NRG License Sub, LLC)
- Sister stations: KBBK; KLIN; KLNC

History
- First air date: July 15, 1996
- Former call signs: KUHG (1990–1996, CP)
- Call sign meaning: "Froggy"

Technical information
- Licensing authority: FCC
- Facility ID: 6490
- Class: C1
- ERP: 100,000 watts
- HAAT: 299.0 meters
- Transmitter coordinates: 40°51′52.00″N 97°16′14.00″W

Links
- Public license information: Public file; LMS
- Website: www.froggy981.com

KFGE (98.1 FM) is a radio station broadcasting a country music format licensed to Milford, Nebraska, United States, serving the Lincoln metropolitan area. Studios are located at Broadcast House at 44th and O Street in Lincoln, while its transmitter is located near Utica. It is one of several stations across the United States that uses the "Froggy" branding.

== History ==
The current 98.1 station dates to July 15, 1996. Froggy had been started at 105.3 MHz (now KLNC) on February 3, 1992.

In August 2007, Triad Broadcasting sold the station, along with its sister stations in the Lincoln market, to NRG.

In March 2026, it was announced that NRG Media would sell its Lincoln cluster to Connoisseur Media.
