= KLIN =

Radio station in Lincoln, Nebraska

- Lincoln, Nebraska; United States
- Broadcast area: Lincoln metropolitan area
- Frequency: 1400 kHz
- Branding: News/Talk 1400 AM 99.3 FM

Programming
- Format: Talk radio
- Network: Fox News Radio
- Affiliations: Compass Media Networks; Premiere Networks; Townhall; Westwood One; Nebraska Cornhuskers Radio Network; Denver Broncos Radio Network

Ownership
- Owner: NRG Media (sale to Connoisseur Media pending); (NRG License Sub, LLC)
- Sister stations: KBBK; KFGE; KLNC

History
- First air date: August 11, 1947 (as KOLN)
- Former call signs: KOLN (1946–1955)
- Call sign meaning: Lincoln

Technical information
- Licensing authority: FCC
- Facility ID: 35064
- Class: C
- Power: 1,000 watts
- Transmitter coordinates: 40°50′54″N 96°40′30.1″W
- Translator: 99.3 K257GN (Lincoln)
- Repeater: 107.3 KBBK-HD3 (Lincoln)

Links
- Public license information: Public file; LMS
- Webcast: Listen live
- Website: www.klin.com

KLIN (1400 kHz) is a commercial AM radio station broadcasting a talk radio format in Lincoln, Nebraska, United States, and is owned by NRG Media. The studios are in Broadcast House at 44th Street and East O Street (U.S. Route 34).

KLIN is a Class C station, broadcasting with maximum power of 1,000 watts, using a non-directional antenna. The transmitter is off North 31st Street, near Salt Creek and Cornhusker Highway in the northern part of the city. Programming is also heard on FM translator K257GN at 99.3 MHz in Lincoln.

== History ==
=== Early years ===
KLIN had its antecedents in Fremont, Nebraska, where an AM station on 1400 kHz was originally authorized in 1940, with the call letters KORN. The station was sold to Inland Broadcasting in 1947. In connection with the acquisition, the FCC authorized Inland to relocate the station to Lincoln and change the call sign to KOLN. It also obtained a construction permit to build a new station on 1340 kHz at Fremont, to become KORN.

KOLN first signed on the air on August 11, 1947. It was a network affiliate of the Mutual Broadcasting System (MBS). The station broadcast on 1400 kHz with 250 watts of power. Its studios were in the New Federal Securities Building in Lincoln.

=== TV and FM stations ===
In February 1953, station owner Cornhusker Radio and Television Corporation established KOLN's companion television station KOLN-TV. Broadcasting pioneer John Fetzer purchased the AM and TV stations in August 1953. Fetzer sold KOLN radio in 1955, in order to devote all his energies to TV. KOLN radio changed its call sign to KLIN on June 1, 1955, and the station moved to offices and studios in the Sharp Building in downtown Lincoln.

The Fletcher-Mitchell Corporation acquired KLIN in December 1956. It was a Nebraska corporation owned by Jonathan M. Fletcher and James I. Mitchell. In May 1963, Mitchell acquired 100% ownership. That year, KLIN relocated to 13th and L Streets. In April 1965, KLIN was sold to Shurtleff-Schorr Broadcasting Corp., a Nebraska corporation owned by Donald O. Shurtleff and Paul C. Schorr. That summer, a minority interest in the company was acquired by station manager Jack L. Callaway.

In 1968, KLIN added a sister station, KLIN-FM at 107.3 MHz, airing an automated beautiful music format. Today that station is co-owned KBBK, playing hot adult contemporary music.

=== Changes in ownership ===
In the fall of 1971, KLIN, Inc., a Nebraska corporation owned by Norton Warner, acquired the station licenses. KLIN-AM-FM moved into the present offices and studios at Broadcast House in the fall of 1976.

In May 2000, KLIN was acquired by a licensee entity of Triad Broadcasting.

In August 2007, Triad sold the stations to NRG Media.

In March 2026, it was announced that NRG Media would sell its Lincoln cluster to Connoisseur Media.

=== FM translators ===
On May 3, 2012, KLIN began simulcasting on FM translator K233AN 94.5 FM. The simulcast lasted until August 26, 2014, when K233AN switched to a simulcast of KBBK's HD2 subchannel, "RED 94.5". KLIN now simulcasts in high definition on KBBK's HD3 subchannel.

In late 2017, KLIN was authorized to construct an FM translator to rebroadcast its signal on 99.3 MHz. The Commission granted the license for K257GN on July 30, 2021.

== Programming ==
Weekdays on KLIN begin with LNK Today with Jack and Friends, a local news and interview show. KLIN airs Sports Nightly with Greg Sharpe and Jessica Coody in the evenings. The rest of the weekday schedule is nationally syndicated talk programs, including Brian Kilmeade and Friends, The Clay Travis and Buck Sexton Show, The Sean Hannity Show, The Mark Levin Show, Caravan to Midnight with John B. Wells, Red Eye Radio and This Morning, America's First News with Gordon Deal.

Weekend syndicated programs include The Kim Komando Show, Bill Handel on the Law, The Car Doctor Ron Ananian, Rudy Maxa World Travel, Gun Talk with Tom Gresham and Sunday Night with Bill Cunningham.

KLIN is the flagship station of Nebraska Cornhuskers football, men's basketball, women's basketball and baseball. In 2014, KLIN became an affiliate of the Denver Broncos Radio Network. KLIN has previously held NFL affiliations with the Detroit Lions and the Washington Redskins.
