= KOZT =

- Fort Bragg, California; United States
- Broadcast area: Fort Bragg-Ukiah area
- Frequency: 95.3 MHz
- Branding: The Coast - Mendocino County's FM

Programming
- Format: Album oriented rock
- Affiliations: Westwood One

Ownership
- Owner: California Radio Partners, Inc.

History
- First air date: December 5, 1981

Technical information
- Licensing authority: FCC
- Facility ID: 8326
- Class: B
- ERP: 35,000 watts
- HAAT: 157 meters (515 ft)
- Transmitter coordinates: 39°24′24″N 123°44′4″W
- Translators: 95.9 K240AQ (Mendocino); 95.9 K240AU (Ukiah)

Links
- Public license information: Public file; LMS
- Webcast: Listen Live
- Website: kozt.com

KOZT (95.3 FM; "The Coast") is a radio station broadcasting an album oriented rock format. Licensed to Ft. Bragg, California, United States, the station primarily serves Mendocino County, California. It is currently owned by California Radio Partners, Inc. and features local programming.

The station is one of the pioneers in the adult album alternative format, but co-owner and AOR pioneer Tom Yates prefers adult rock.

The Coast won the National Association of Broadcasters Marconi Award as "Rock Station Of The Year" in 2002 and has been nominated for four other Marconis. The Coast has also received three Crystal Awards for community service.
