= WGOH =

- Grayson, Kentucky; United States
- Broadcast area: Huntington-Ashland
- Frequency: 1370 kHz
- Branding: Go Radio Kentucky Country

Programming
- Format: Classic country
- Affiliations: Townhall News; Kentucky News Network; Sports Radio Network

Ownership
- Owner: Carter County Broadcasting Co., Inc.
- Sister stations: WUGO

History
- First air date: June 1, 1959
- Call sign meaning: W Grayson - Olive Hill

Technical information
- Licensing authority: FCC
- Facility ID: 9210
- Class: D
- Power: 5,000 watts day 21 watts night
- Transmitter coordinates: 38°19′44″N 82°58′33″W
- Translator: 100.9 W265CH (Grayson)

Links
- Public license information: Public file; LMS
- Webcast: Listen Live
- Website: wgohwugo.com

WGOH (1370 AM is a radio station licensed to Grayson, Kentucky. WGOH broadcasts a full service mix of classic country and bluegrass music. The station serves northeast Kentucky and is owned by Carter County Broadcasting Co., Inc. WGOH features programming from Townhall News and the Kentucky News Network as well as broadcast football and basketball games from both East Carter and West Carter High Schools.

== Translator ==
Broadcast translator for WGOH
Call sign	Frequency	City of license	FID	ERP (W)	HAAT	Class	FCC info
W265CH	100.9 FM	Grayson, Kentucky	153981	250	101.2 m (332 ft)	D	LMS
