= Sexual abuse scandal in the Roman Catholic Diocese of Fairbanks =

The sexual abuse scandal in the Catholic Diocese of Fairbanks is a major chapter in the series of Catholic sex abuse cases in the Diocese of Fairbanks in the state of Alaska in the United States and the Jesuits religious order.

== Nature of the abuse ==
Abuse included fondling, rape and assault of girls and boys in churches, rectories and homes of priests. This generally occurred in isolated geographic areas where the children could not communicate with the outside world. There were very few hospitals and health facilities in the area, something which further complicated the situation. The fact that the victims were very poor and very young also made the problem very difficult.

== Case of Father James Poole ==
Father James Poole is alleged to have molested countless children, but has never been convicted of a crime because the Jesuits have settled out of court for the silence of the victims. The exact sum of the settlements is unknown because the victims have had to sign confidentiality agreements, but it is known that the total since 2005 is over $5 million. One such payment was for $500,000 for raping a dying woman, to whom he had been summoned to perform the last rites.

== 2008 bankruptcy ==
In February 2008, the diocese of Fairbanks announced plans to file for Chapter 11 bankruptcy, claiming inability to pay the 140 plaintiffs, who filed claims against the diocese for alleged sexual abuse by priests or church workers dating from the 1950s to the early 1980s. The Society of Jesus, Oregon Province, was named as a co-defendant in the case, and settled for $50 million. The Diocese, which reports an operating budget of approximately $6 million, claims one of the diocese's insurance carriers failed to "participate meaningfully".

== Allegations of racism ==
Many Alaskan Natives have said that the law enforcement in the region have a long history of not taking reports of sexual violence against indigenous people seriously. Certain Alaska Natives and their attorneys have accused the Jesuit order of using remote villages in Alaska which are predominantly indigenous as a "dumping ground" for priests known to have a history of child-molesting. Critics have also accused the Church in Fairbanks and the Jesuit order of offering far less in monetary compensation to child abuse victims who were natives than to non-native child abuse victims.
