= KWHI =

Coordinates: 30°10′5.8″N 96°25′20.9″W

- Brenham, Texas; United States
- Broadcast area: Brazos Valley
- Frequency: 1280 kHz

Programming
- Format: Full-service

Ownership
- Owner: Tom S. Whitehead, Inc.
- Sister stations: KTTX

History
- First air date: 1947

Technical information
- Licensing authority: FCC
- Facility ID: 24250
- Class: D
- Power: 1,000 watts (day); 72 watts (night)
- Translator: 101.7 K269GU (Brenham)

Links
- Public license information: Public file; LMS
- Webcast: Listen live
- Website: kwhi.com

KWHI is a radio station airing a full-service format licensed to Brenham, Texas, broadcasting on 1280 AM. The station is owned by Tom S. Whitehead, Inc.
