= WPCH (AM) =

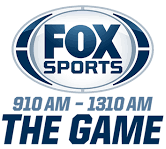
- West Point, Georgia; United States
- Frequency: 1310 kHz
- Branding: Fox Sports 910 AM - 1310 AM The Game

Programming
- Format: Sports
- Affiliations: Fox Sports Radio

Ownership
- Owner: iHeartMedia, Inc.; (iHM Licenses, LLC)
- Sister stations: WCJM-FM; WKKR; WMXA; WTLM; WZMG

History
- First air date: August 1958
- Former call signs: WBMK (1958–1976); WZZZ (1976–1988); WPLV (1988–1994); WCJM (1994–1996); WPLV (1996–2015)
- Call sign meaning: "Peach"

Technical information
- Licensing authority: FCC
- Facility ID: 54864
- Class: D
- Power: 1,000 watts day; 25 watts night
- Transmitter coordinates: 32°53′48″N 85°9′24″W
- Repeaters: 910 WZMG (Pepperell, Alabama)

Links
- Public license information: Public file; LMS
- Webcast: Listen live (via iHeartRadio)
- Website: foxsportsthegame.iheart.com

WPCH (1310 AM) is a radio station broadcasting a sports format. Licensed to West Point, Georgia, United States, the station is owned by San Antonio–based iHeartMedia, through licensee iHM Licenses, LLC, and features programming from Fox Sports Radio.

== History ==
The station signed on in August 1958 as WBMK. It changed its call sign to WZZZ on December 1, 1976, and was assigned the call sign WPLV on January 1, 1988. On October 7, 1994, the station changed its call sign to WCJM, then on February 23, 1996, switched back to WPLV.

In March 2003, Root Communications License Company, L.P., reached an agreement to sell this station to Qantum Communications subsidiary Qantum of Auburn License Company, LLC, as part of a 26 station deal valued at $82.2 million. The deal was approved by the Federal Communications Commission on April 30, 2003, and the transaction was consummated on July 2, 2003.

On May 15, 2014, Qantum Communications announced that it would sell its 29 stations, including WPLV, to Clear Channel Communications (now iHeartMedia), in a transaction connected to Clear Channel's sale of WALK AM-FM in Patchogue, New York, to Connoisseur Media via Qantum. The transaction was consummated on September 9, 2014.

The station took on the WPCH call sign on June 1, 2015.

== Programming ==
All of the programming on WPCH is from Fox Sports Radio.
