= WUGO =

- Grayson, Kentucky; United States
- Broadcast area: Huntington-Ashland
- Frequency: 99.7 MHz
- Branding: WUGO 99.7 FM

Programming
- Format: Adult contemporary
- Affiliations: Townhall News; Kentucky News Network; UK Sports Network (University of Kentucky Athletics); Cincinnati Reds Radio Network (Cincinnati Reds)

Ownership
- Owner: Carter County Broadcasting Co., Inc.
- Sister stations: WGOH

History
- First air date: February 1967 (as WGOH-FM at 102.3)
- Former call signs: WGOH-FM (1967–1979)
- Former frequencies: 102.3 MHz (1967–2013)

Technical information
- Licensing authority: FCC
- Facility ID: 9212
- Class: A
- ERP: 4,800 watts
- HAAT: 111 meters (364 ft)
- Transmitter coordinates: 38°19′44″N 82°58′33″W

Links
- Public license information: Public file; LMS
- Webcast: Listen Live
- Website: wgohwugo.com

WUGO (99.7 FM) is a radio station licensed to Grayson, Kentucky. WUGO broadcasts an adult contemporary format. The station serves the Northeast Kentucky area and is currently owned by Carter County Broadcasting Co., Inc. WUGO features programming from Townhall News, the Kentucky News Network, as well as broadcasts football and basketball games from both East Carter and West Carter High Schools. WUGO also broadcasts University of Kentucky football and men's basketball games as well as MLB's Cincinnati Reds games. The station has won four National Crystal Radio Awards for community service. Staff includes Jeff Roe (Station Manager), Matt Shufflebarger (News Director) & Mike Nelson (Program Director & sales).
