= KTTX =

- Brenham, Texas; United States
- Broadcast area: Bryan-College Station
- Frequency: 106.1 MHz
- Branding: K-TEX 106

Programming
- Format: Country music

Ownership
- Owner: Tom S. Whitehead, Inc.
- Sister stations: KWHI

History
- First air date: 1964 (as KWHI-FM)
- Former call signs: KWHI-FM (1964–1992)

Technical information
- Licensing authority: FCC
- Facility ID: 67301
- Class: C2
- ERP: 50,000 watts
- HAAT: 150 m (492 ft)
- Transmitter coordinates: 30°21′48.00″N 96°34′33.00″W

Links
- Public license information: Public file; LMS
- Webcast: Listen Live
- Website: ktex.com

KTTX (106.1 FM, KTEX 106) is a radio station broadcasting a country music format. Licensed to Brenham, Texas, United States, the station serves the College Station area. The station is currently owned by Tom S. Whitehead, Inc. Studios are located in downtown Brenham, and the transmitter is near Somerville in Burleson County.

== Format ==
Since its inception, KTTX has had a music intensive format. Known for their 12 in a Row, the station promises listeners 40 minutes of uninterrupted country music. KTTX focuses on Texas Country or Red Dirt music, with the tagline Sounds Like Texas (although they play more music out of Nashville than Texas music).

== Current DJs ==
- Cowboy Dave & Tiffany Taylor --Mornings With Cowboy Dave & Tiffany Taylor
- Courtney Cartwright --Country Cafe
- David Bugenske --The Drive Home with David
- Craig Montana - The Stars at Night

=== Weekends ===
- Craig Montana
- Tiffany Taylor
- Cowboy Dave
- Courtney Cartwright
- David Bugenske

== Community ==
KTTX is known for their community support throughout the Brazos Valley. Over the years the station has been involved in many charitable endeavors and makes public service a priority.
