= List of radio awards =

This list of radio awards is an index of articles that describe notable awards given to radio stations, their personnel, and the creators of content for radio. The list is organized by country.

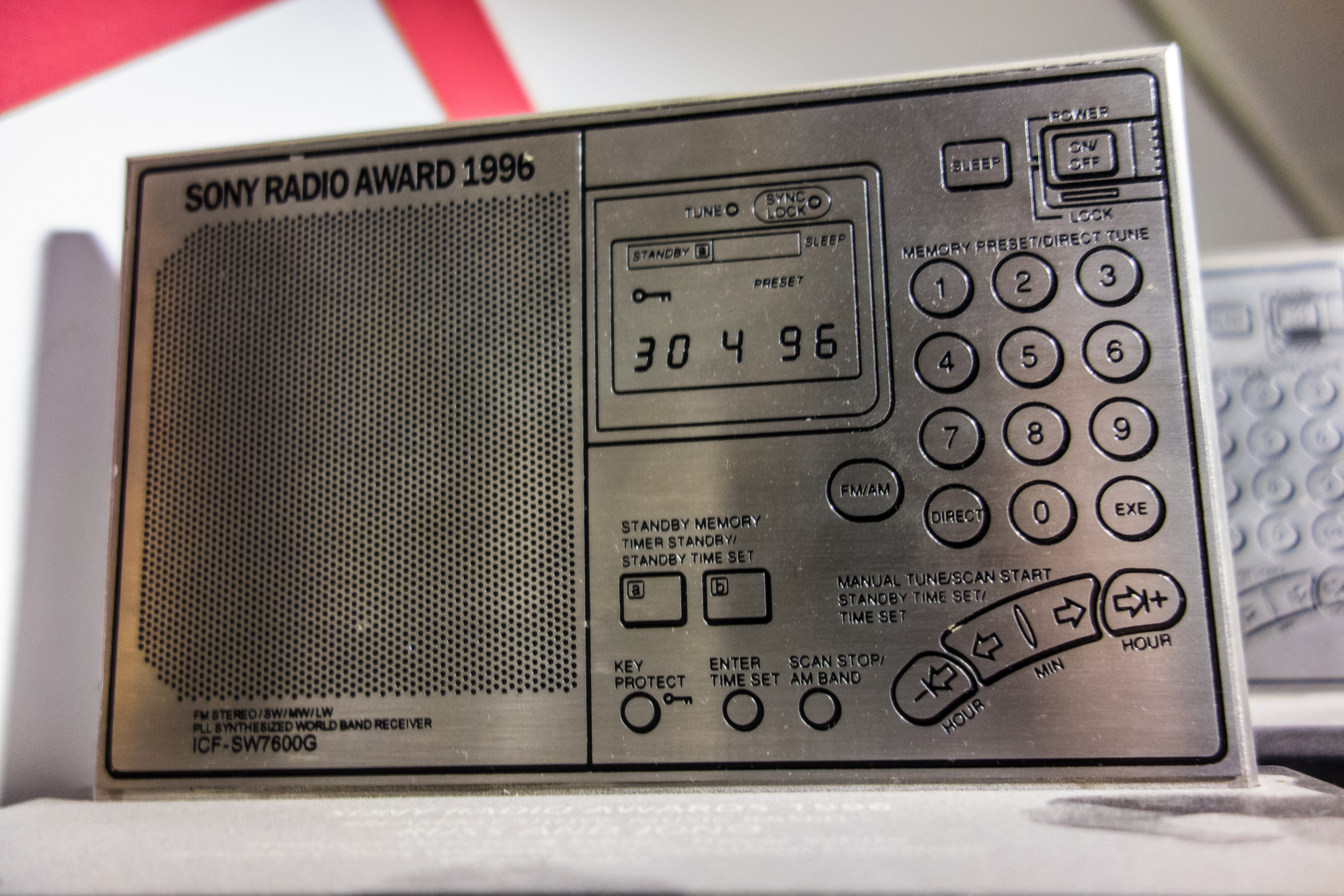
A Sony Radio Award, presented to Virgin Radio in 1996

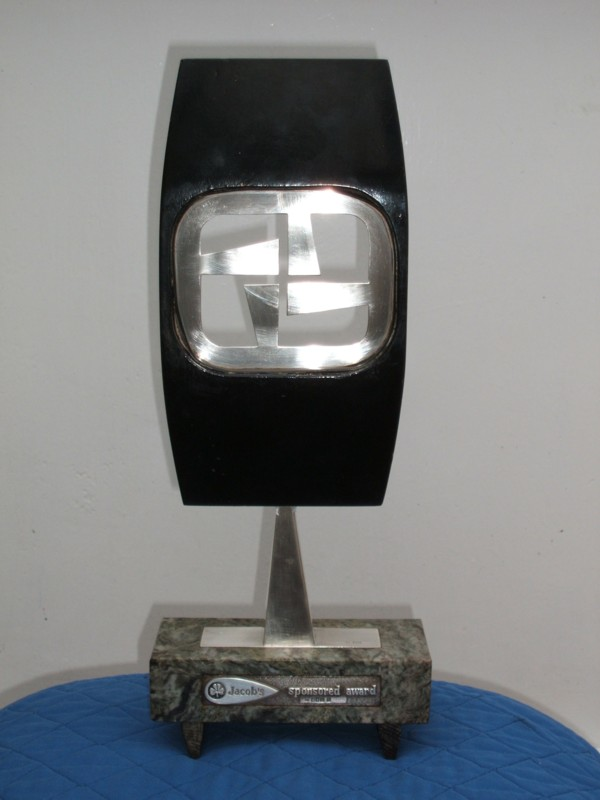
A Jacob's Awards giving to Stuart Hetherington

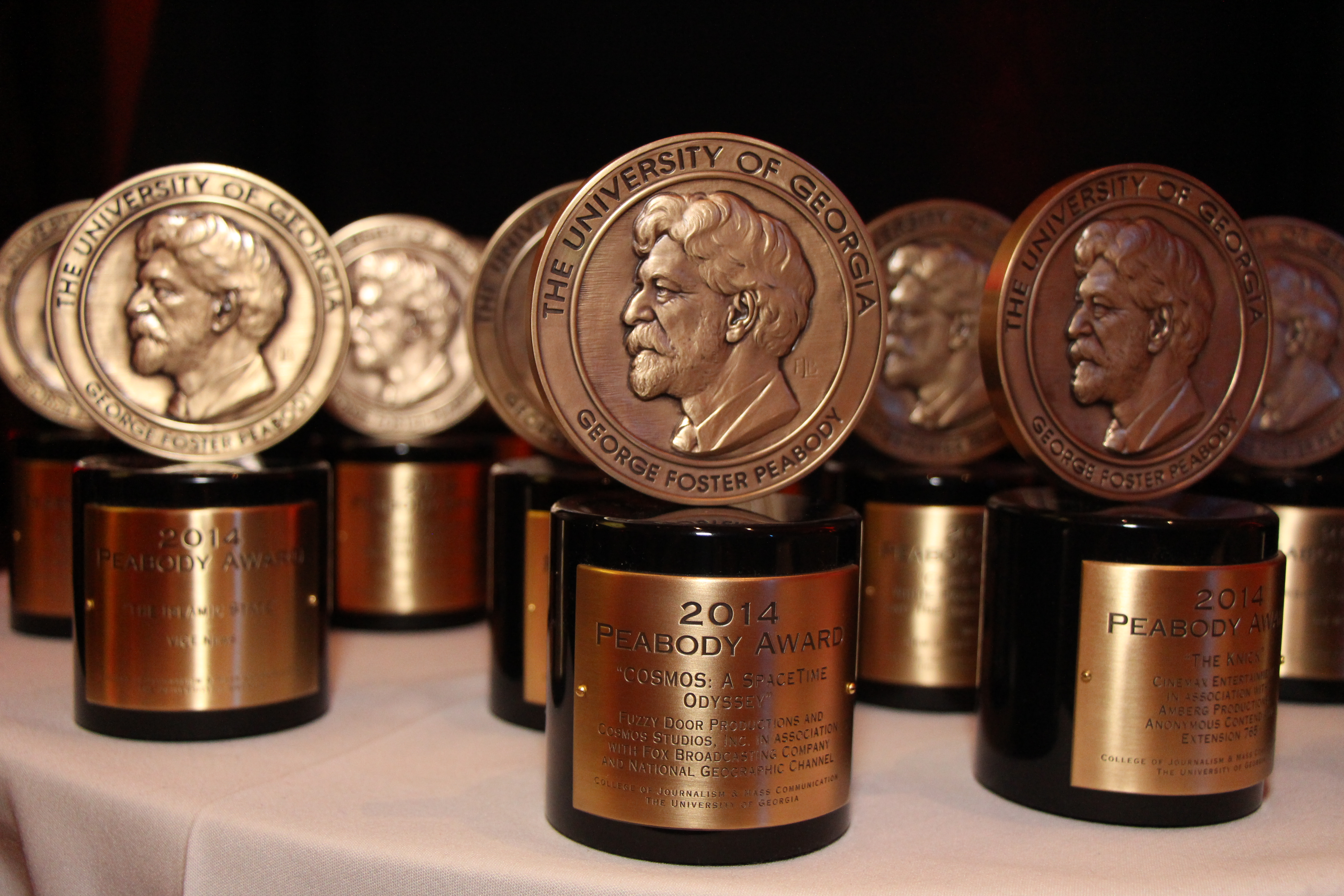
Peabody Awards statuettes

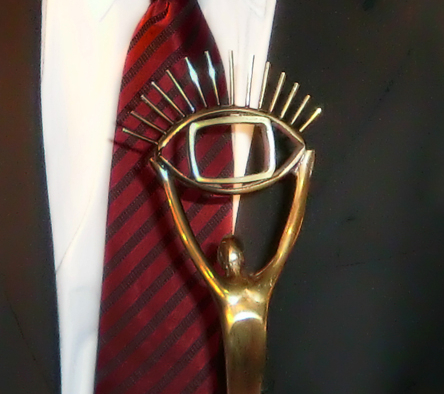
Iris Award trophy

Country	Award	Sponsor	Notes
Argentina	Clarín Awards	Clarín	Argentine achievements in entertainment, sports, literature, and advertising
Australia	Australian Commercial Radio Awards	Commercial Radio Australia	Outstanding achievements in the radio industry
Europe	Prix Europa	European Broadcasting Festival	Best European Television, Radio and Online productions
Europe	Rose d'Or	Eurovision (network)	Entertainment broadcasting and programming
Europe	Åke Blomström Award	Selection Committee	Best radio documentary
Germany	Ernst Reuter Prize	Minister of Intra-German Relations	Audio plays and radio documentation about the divided Germany
Ireland	Jacob's Award	Jacob's	Outstanding contributions to Irish TV and radio
Italy	Prix Italia	RAI	87 public and private radio and television organizations
Japan	Galaxy Award (Japan)	Japan Council for Better Radio and Television	Television programs, radio programs, television commercials, and news programming
New Zealand	New Zealand Radio Awards	Radio Broadcasters Association	Excellence in radio broadcasting
Pakistan	Pakistan Media Awards	Pakistan Media Awards	Radio, TV, film and theatre achievements
Philippines	MTRCB Radio Awards	Movie and Television Review and Classification Board	
Philippines	PMPC Star Awards for Radio	Philippine Movie Press Club	Radio achievements. A complement to its TV , music and movie counterparts
Portugal	Prémio Autores	Sociedade Portuguesa de Autores	
Singapore	Golden Mic Awards	Mediacorp	Excellence of presenters and producers in MediaCorp Radio
Spain	Premios Ondas	Cadena SER	Professionals in the fields of radio and television broadcasting, the cinema, and the music industry
United Kingdom	Audio and Radio Industry Awards	Radio Academy	Excellence in radio and audio presenting and production
United Kingdom	BBC Audio Drama Awards	BBC Radio	Excellence in the radio industry, in particular in audio dramas
United Kingdom	Community Radio Awards	Community Radio Awards	Showcase the work of community radio volunteers
United Kingdom	Frank Gillard Awards	BBC Local Radio	Tecognise achievements and encourage excellence in the programming at BBC Local Radio stations across England
United Kingdom	Giles Cooper Awards	BBC, Methuen Publishing	Plays written for BBC Radio
United Kingdom	Radio Academy Awards	Radio Academy	Music, news and speech through to radio drama, comedy and sport
United Kingdom	Richard Imison Award	BBC Radio	Best radio drama
United Kingdom	Tinniswood Award	Authors' Licensing and Collecting Society	Original radio drama broadcast within the United Kingdom
United States	Gabriel Award	Catholic Press Association	Honor excellence in broadcasting
United States	Georgia Radio Hall Of Fame	Georgia Radio Museum and Hall of Fame	Men and women of radio broadcasting in the state of Georgia
United States	Barrett Media	Barrett Sports Media Mark Chernoff Award	Top Sports Radio Program Director
	Barrett Media	Barrett Sports Media Lifetime Achievement Award	Recognizing a Sports Media Industry icon
	Barrett Media	Barrett Sports Media Jeff Smulyan Award	Top Sports Radio Executive
	Barrett Media	Barrett Sports Media Champion's Award	Recognizing an individual who has used their platform to make a meaningful difference beyond the airwaves
United States	Gracie Awards	Alliance for Women in Media Foundation	Celebrate and honor programming created for women, by women, and about women
United States	NAB Crystal Radio Awards	National Association of Broadcasters	Efforts to improve the quality of life in communities
United States	NAB Marconi Radio Awards	National Association of Broadcasters	Top radio stations and on-air personalities in the United States
United States	New Music Awards	New Music Weekly	Excellence in music to both recording artists and radio stations
United States	Peabody Award	National Association of Broadcasters	Distinguished achievement and meritorious public service by television and radio stations, networks, producing organizations, individuals, and the World Wide Web
United States	Pulitzer Prize for Audio Reporting	Columbia University	Recognizes distinguished reporting on a radio program or podcast
Uruguay	Iris Award (Uruguay)	El País	Achievements in Uruguayan radio and television

== See also ==
- Lists of awards
