= KBBK =

Radio station in Lincoln, Nebraska

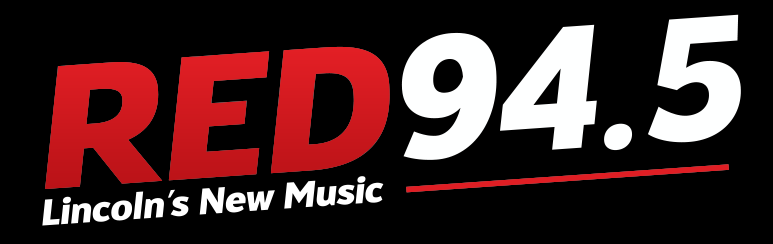
- Lincoln, Nebraska; United States
- Broadcast area: Lincoln metropolitan area
- Frequency: 107.3 MHz (HD Radio)
- Branding: B-107.3

Programming
- Format: Hot adult contemporary
- Subchannels: HD2: Rhythmic contemporary; HD3: Talk radio (KLIN)

Ownership
- Owner: NRG Media (sale to Connoisseur Media pending); (NRG License Sub, LLC)
- Sister stations: KFGE; KLIN; KLNC

History
- First air date: September 1, 1968
- Former call signs: KLIN-FM (1968–1988); KEZG (1988–2000)

Technical information
- Licensing authority: FCC
- Facility ID: 35063
- Class: C1
- ERP: 100,000 watts
- HAAT: 168 meters (551 ft)
- Transmitter coordinates: 40°43′38.00″N 96°36′51.00″W
- Translator: HD2: 94.5 K233AN (Lincoln)

Links
- Public license information: Public file; LMS
- Webcast: Listen live Listen live (HD2)
- Website: b1073.com; red945.com (HD2)

KBBK (107.3 FM, "B-107.3") is a commercial radio station in Lincoln, Nebraska, United States. It broadcasts a hot adult contemporary format. It is owned by NRG Media with studios at Broadcast House on 44th Street and East O Street (U.S. Route 34).

KBBK is a Class C1 FM station, with an effective radiated power (ERP) of 100,000 watts, the maximum for most FM stations. The transmitter is in the master antenna farm on South 84th Street and Yankee Hill Road in the southeast part of the city. KBBK broadcasts using HD Radio technology. Its HD2 digital subchannel carries a rhythmic contemporary format known as "Red 94.5" feeding FM translator K233AN at 94.5 MHz. That transmitter is atop the US Bank Building in Downtown Lincoln. The HD3 subchannel simulcasts the talk radio programming of KLIN.

== History ==
The station signed on the air on September 1, 1968. Its original call sign was KLIN-FM, the sister station of KLIN 1400 AM. The stations were owned by Shurtleff-Schorr Broadcasting Corp., a Nebraska corporation owned by Lincoln businessmen Donald O. Shurtleff and Paul C. Schorr. KLIN-FM broadcast an automated beautiful music format.

In the fall of 1971, KLIN, Inc., a Nebraska corporation owned by Norton Warner, acquired the station licenses. The FM call sign changed to KEZG in 1988, with the letters 'EZ' referring to easy listening music. On August 28, 2000, the call letters switched to the current KBBK, with the station airing adult contemporary music.

The station was later owned by Triad Broadcasting. In August 2007, KBBK was purchased by current owner NRG Media.

In March 2026, it was announced that NRG Media would sell its Lincoln cluster to Connoisseur Media.
