= KFOR (AM) =

Radio station in Lincoln, Nebraska

- Lincoln, Nebraska; United States
- Frequency: 1240 kHz
- Branding: KFOR FM 101.5 & 1240 AM

Programming
- Format: News/talk
- Affiliations: ABC News Radio; Bloomberg Radio; Compass Media Networks; Premiere Networks; Radio America; Westwood One; Lincoln Saltdogs

Ownership
- Owner: Connoisseur Media; (Alpha 3E Licensee LLC)
- Sister stations: KFRX; KIBZ; KTGL; KZKX

History
- First air date: March 1924

Technical information
- Licensing authority: FCC
- Facility ID: 34436
- Class: C
- Power: 1,000 watts
- Transmitter coordinates: 40°49′10″N 96°39′32.1″W
- Translator: 101.5 K268DF (Lincoln)

Links
- Public license information: Public file; LMS
- Webcast: Listen live
- Website: www.kfornow.com

KFOR (1240 kHz) is a commercial radio station in Lincoln, Nebraska. It broadcasts a news/talk radio format and is owned by Connoisseur Media, through licensee Alpha 3E Licensee LLC. The station's studios are on Cornhusker Highway (U.S. Route 6) in Northeast Lincoln.

KFOR is a Class C station, powered at 1,000 watts using a non-directional antenna. Its transmitter is on Vine Street east of downtown Lincoln. Programming is also heard on 130-watt FM translator K268DF at 101.5 MHz.

== Programming ==
Weekdays on KFOR begin with Lincoln's Morning News, hosted by Chris Schmidt and Carol Turner, with news and sports from Jeff Motz. KFOR also has a local talk show in late morning and a local sports show in late afternoons. The rest of the weekday schedule is nationally syndicated talk programs: The Dan Bongino Show, The Joe Pags Show, The Ben Shapiro Show, The Ramsey Show with Dave Ramsey, Bloomberg Daybreak, America in the Morning, Coast to Coast AM with George Noory and Markley, Van Camp & Robbins.

Weekends feature specialty shows on health, money, aging, gardening, pets, real estate, cars and the outdoors. Syndicated weekend shows include Our American Stories with Lee Habeeb, The Weekend with Michael Brown and The Jesus Christ Show with Neil Savaadra. In the summer, KFOR carries Lincoln Saltdogs baseba;;. Other sports programming include Kansas City Chiefs football and high school sports in the Lincoln area. Most hours begin with an update from ABC News Radio.

== History ==
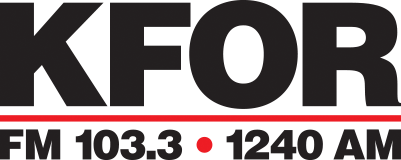
Former KFOR logo used when it was simulcasting on K277CA (103.3 FM)

KFOR signed on the air in March 1924. It was the fourth radio station in Nebraska. Its original city of license was David City, Nebraska. New owners moved the station to Lincoln in 1927, with studios in the Hotel Lincoln.

In the 1930s, the station broadcast on 12100 kHz, with 250 watts of power. It was a daytimer, required to go off the air at night. In 1941, with the enactment of the North American Regional Broadcasting Agreement (NARBA), KFOR moved to 1240 kHz. It was a Class IV station, allowed to broadcast at 250 watts around the clock. The station was a network affiliate of the Mutual Broadcasting System, carrying its dramas, comedies, news and sports during the "Golden Age of Radio".

The radio ministry Back to the Bible originated on KFOR in 1939. From May 1953 to March 1954, the station's owners operated a television station, KFOR-TV.

On February 15, 2023, at midnight, KFOR began simulcasting on sister station KLMS which had dropped its long-running sports radio format. KFOR also was heard on FM translator K268DF (101.5 FM), which relayed KLMS. The next day, KFOR's former translator, K277CA (103.3 FM), began relaying KLMS, which flipped to an adult hits format as "Mix 103.3"; K268DF then became KFOR's translator.

In May 2025, Connoisseur Media announced its intent to acquire Alpha Media. The Federal Communications Commission approved the sale on August 13, 2025, and the sale was consummated on September 4.
