= KZKX =

Radio station in Seward, Nebraska

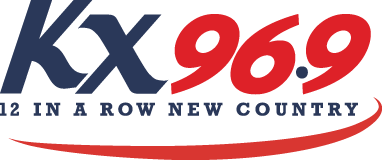
- Seward, Nebraska; United States
- Broadcast area: Lincoln, Nebraska
- Frequency: 96.9 MHz
- Branding: KX 96.9

Programming
- Format: Country music

Ownership
- Owner: Connoisseur Media; (Alpha 3E License, LLC)
- Sister stations: KFOR; KFRX; KIBZ; KTGL

History
- First air date: 1977
- Former call signs: KSRD (1976–1984)

Technical information
- Licensing authority: FCC
- Facility ID: 53143
- Class: C1
- ERP: 100,000 watts
- HAAT: 177 meters (581 ft)

Links
- Public license information: Public file; LMS
- Webcast: Listen live
- Website: www.kzkx.com

KZKX (96.9 FM) is a radio station broadcasting a country music format. Licensed to Seward, Nebraska, United States, the station serves the Lincoln area. The station is owned by Connoisseur Media. Studios are located on Cornhusker Highway in Northeast Lincoln, while its transmitter is located near Valparaiso.
