= KNCO-FM =

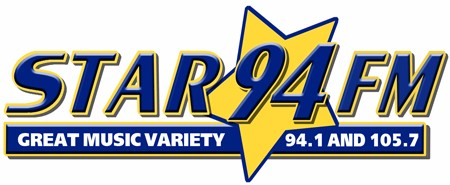
- Grass Valley, California; United States
- Broadcast area: Marysville/Yuba City
- Frequency: 94.1 MHz
- Branding: Star 94 FM

Programming
- Format: Adult contemporary

Ownership
- Owner: Nevada County Broadcasters, Inc.
- Sister stations: KNCO (AM)

History
- First air date: September 7, 1982

Technical information
- Licensing authority: FCC
- Facility ID: 48339
- Class: A
- ERP: 2,350 watts
- HAAT: 161 meters (528 ft)
- Transmitter coordinates: 39°14′1.2″N 121°3′22.1″W

Links
- Public license information: Public file; LMS
- Webcast: Listen live (via iHeartRadio)
- Website: mystarradio.com

KNCO-FM (94.1 FM, "Star 94 FM") is a radio station broadcasting an adult contemporary music format. Licensed to Grass Valley, California, United States, it serves the Marysville/Yuba City area. The station is currently owned by Nevada County Broadcasters, Inc.

== History ==
On September 7, 1982, KNCO-FM first signed on the air. It has broadcast an adult contemporary music format for its entire history.
