= KNCO (AM) =

Coordinates: 39°12′53.6″N 121°00′51.8″W

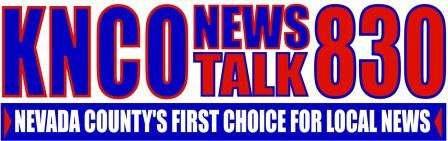
- Grass Valley, California; United States
- Broadcast area: Nevada County, California
- Frequency: 830 kHz
- Branding: News Talk 830

Programming
- Format: Talk radio
- Affiliations: ABC News Radio

Ownership
- Owner: Nevada County Broadcasters, Inc.
- Sister stations: KNCO-FM

History
- First air date: October 1, 1978
- Former frequencies: 1250 kHz (1978–1986)

Technical information
- Licensing authority: FCC
- Facility ID: 47885
- Class: B
- Power: 5,000 watts
- Translator: 106.9 K295CX (Grass Valley)

Links
- Public license information: Public file; LMS
- Webcast: Listen live (via iHeartRadio)
- Website: knco.com

KNCO (830 AM) is a commercial radio station licensed to Grass Valley, California, United States. It is owned by Nevada County Broadcasters and airs a talk radio format. The studios and offices for KNCO and KNCO-FM are on East Main Street in Grass Valley. The station streams its programming on the iHeartRadio platform and app.

KNCO's transmitter is located off of Greenhorn Road in Grass Valley. Programming is also heard on 150-watt FM translator K295CX at 106.9 MHz.

== History ==
KNCO signed on the air on October 1, 1978. It broadcast a mix of middle of the road (MOR) music with news, talk and sports shows. In September 1982, it added an FM station. KNCO-FM 94.1 was programmed with a separate adult contemporary music format.

KNCO was originally on 1250 kHz and was a 500 watt daytimer, required to be off the air from sunset to sunrise. But by the 1980s, the Federal Communications Commission was relaxing rules for clear channel frequencies. That gave KNCO the opportunity to move to the frequency of a clear channel station that would not have been permitted in earlier years.

In 1986, KNCO relocated to 830 kHz, increasing its power to 5,000 watts and was allowed to broadcast at night using a directional antenna. In the 1990s, it eliminated music from its programming, switching to an all-talk format with news and sports.

== Programming ==
Local personalities on KNCO include Tom Fitzsimmons and Chris Gilbert, along with tradio program in late mornings. The remainder of the schedule is nationally syndicated shows. KNCO carries Nevada Union High School football and basketball, and also broadcasts San Francisco 49ers games.
