= WLEN =

Coordinates: 41.903°N 83.987°W

- Adrian, Michigan; United States
- Broadcast area
- Frequency: 103.9 MHz (HD Radio)
- Branding: WLEN 103.9 FM

Programming
- Format: Full-service
- Subchannels: HD2: 96.5 The Cave (Sports)

Ownership
- Owner: Lenawee Broadcasting Company

History
- First air date: June 9, 1965
- Call sign meaning: LENawee County

Technical information
- Licensing authority: FCC
- Facility ID: 37019
- Class: A
- ERP: 3,000 watts
- HAAT: 91 meters (299 ft)
- Translator: HD2: 96.5 W243AD (Adrian)

Links
- Public license information: Public file; LMS
- Website: wlen.com www.965thecave.com (HD2)

WLEN (103.9 FM) is a radio station in Adrian, Michigan, broadcasting a full-service adult contemporary format with a heavy emphasis on local news, weather and sports.

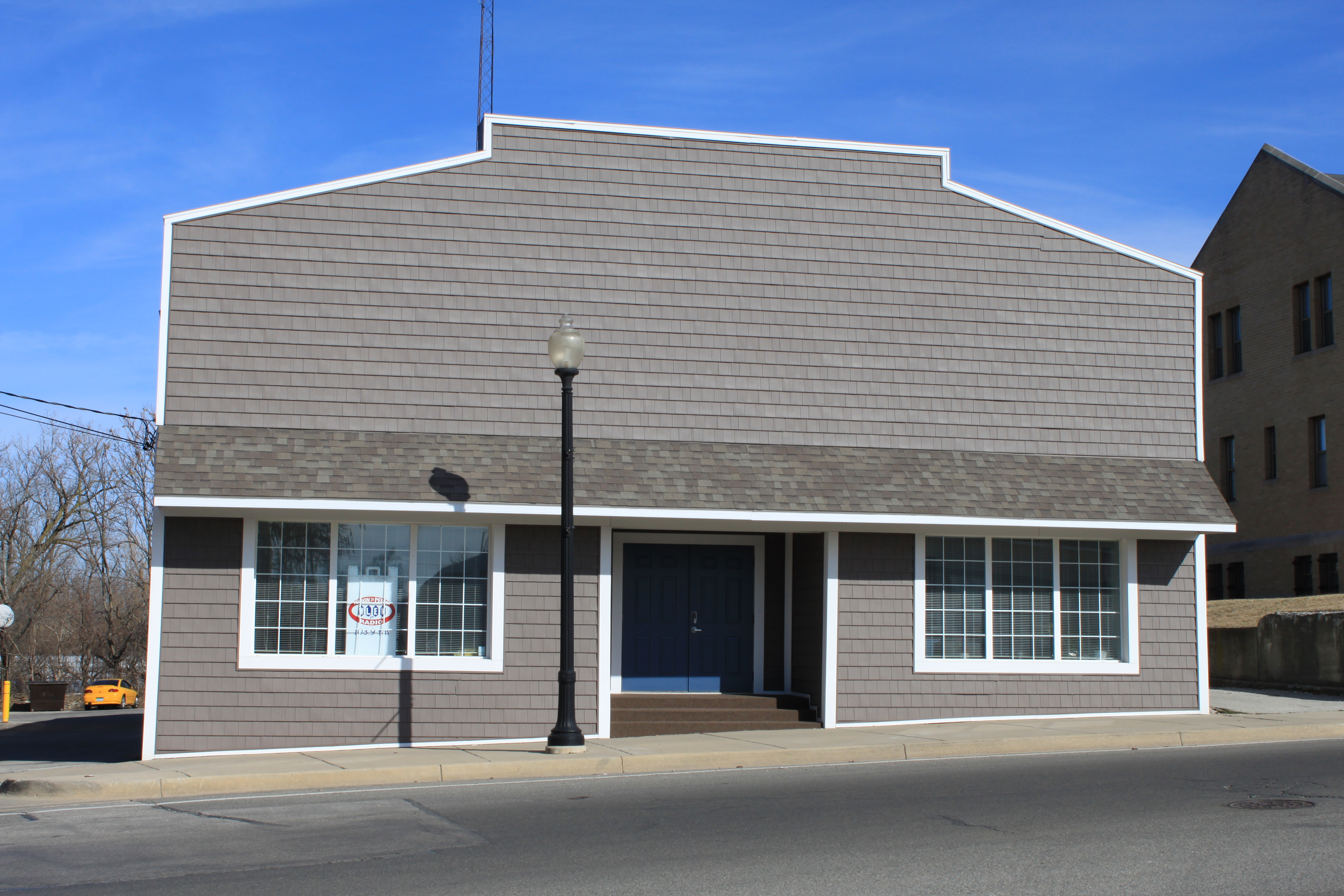
WLEN studios

The station began broadcasting in 1965 as the first FM radio station in Lenawee County, and has been owned by the Koehn family (d/b/a Lenawee Broadcasting Company) since its inception. With WABJ, WQTE and WBZV's sale to a Tennessee-based broadcaster in late 2019, it is now the only locally owned commercial radio station in Lenawee County. WLEN began as a block-programmed station typical of small towns in the 1960s, airing MOR, country music and Top 40 at different times of the day. Today, the music played is a wide mix of adult contemporary and Hot AC hits, with oldies from 1960 to 1989 played on Fridays during "Friday Flashbacks." Like many other AC stations, WLEN plays continuous Christmas music between Thanksgiving and Christmas, taking a break on Fridays for Friday Flashbacks.

WLEN features ABC Network radio news on the hour, hourly. The station features the John Tesh Radio Show Monday through Thursday evenings and the weekend version on Sundays, as well as "Throwback Nation Radio" featuring '80s and '90s hits with a modern twist on Saturday nights. All other music programming is locally hosted or automated.

Other WLEN features include national and local newscasts, "Classified" (a Tradio-style feature), "Viewpoint" (a Saturday-morning phone-in talk show hosted by Dale Gaertner, Program Director), and weekly specialty features focusing on neighboring communities such as Tecumseh, Onsted, Blissfield, Hudson, the Irish Hills area, and Deerfield.

Notable personalities include sports broadcasters John Koehn, Jeff Bowman, Chris Renwick and Patt Hayes. Koehn has broadcast Adrian High School Football for over 40 years. The station also features a popular Tejano music show, "Radio Picoso", on Sunday afternoons, hosted by Herbey Atkinson.

Julie Koehn is the General Manager of WLEN Radio and President of Lenawee Broadcasting.

WLEN began transmitting in HD Radio in the spring of 2015. WLEN-HD2 is relayed on analog translator W243AD (96.5 FM). For nearly five years, the HD2 and translator aired a delayed rebroadcast of the analog and HD1 programming. In February 2020, WLEN debuted a Sports radio format on 96.5 FM and 103.9 HD2, branded as "96.5 The Cave" and airing programming from CBS Sports Radio.

== Sources ==
- Michiguide.com - WLEN History
