= KNTK =

- Firth, Nebraska; United States
- Broadcast area: Lincoln metropolitan area
- Frequency: 93.7 MHz
- Branding: 93.7 The Ticket

Programming
- Format: Sports
- Affiliations: Infinity Sports Network

Ownership
- Owner: Rebecca Pearson; (BDP Communications LLC)

History
- First air date: 2011 (as KOLB)
- Former call signs: KOLB (2007–2011)
- Call sign meaning: K Nebraska TicKet

Technical information
- Licensing authority: FCC
- Facility ID: 170485
- Class: A
- ERP: 6,000 watts
- HAAT: 71.1 meters (233 ft)
- Transmitter coordinates: 40°34′57.40″N 96°37′16.30″W

Links
- Public license information: Public file; LMS
- Webcast: Listen Live
- Website: theticketfm.com

KNTK (93.7 MHz) is a commercial FM radio station broadcasting a sports radio format, branded as "93.7 The Ticket". Licensed to Firth, Nebraska, the station serves the Lincoln metropolitan area. The station is owned by BDP Communications, headed by Rebecca Pearson. The studios are on O Street in downtown Lincoln. On weekdays, local sports shows are heard. At night and on weekends, the station carries Infinity Sports Network.

KNTK is a Class A FM station. It has an effective radiated power (ERP) of 6,000 watts. The transmitter is on Olive Hill Road in Firth.
