= KIBZ =

Radio station in Crete, Nebraska

Coordinates: 40.5183°N 96.7689°W

- Crete, Nebraska; United States
- Broadcast area: Lincoln metropolitan area
- Frequency: 104.1 MHz
- Branding: 104.1 The Blaze

Programming
- Language: English
- Format: Active rock
- Affiliations: United Stations Radio Networks

Ownership
- Owner: Connoisseur Media; (Alpha 3E License, LLC)
- Sister stations: KFOR; KFRX; KTGL; KZKX

History
- First air date: August 20, 1976
- Former call signs: KTAP (1976–1986); KBVB (1986–1988); KKNB (1988–2001); KSLI-FM (2001–2004)
- Former frequencies: 103.9 MHz (1976–1989)

Technical information
- Licensing authority: FCC
- Facility ID: 640
- Class: C2
- ERP: 31,000 watts
- HAAT: 187 meters (614 ft)

Links
- Public license information: Public file; LMS
- Webcast: Listen live
- Website: kibz.com

KIBZ (104.1 FM, "104.1 The Blaze") is a commercial radio station licensed to Crete, Nebraska, United States, and serving the Lincoln metropolitan area. It airs an active rock format and is owned by Connoisseur Media. KIBZ's studios are on Cornhusker Highway (U.S. Route 6) in Northeast Lincoln, and the transmitter is sited off SW 29th Road near West Gage Road in Hallam.

== History ==
=== Early years ===
The station signed on the air on August 20, 1976. The original call sign was KTAP, targeting Saline County. It was owned by Airwaves Broadcasting Service and it originally broadcast on 103.9 FM, a Class A frequency with only 3,000 watts of power.

In 1986, the call letters changed to KBVB. In January 1989, after the station was sold to new owners, KBVB moved to 104.1 FM, which allowed it to increase its power as a Class C2 station. After an 82-hour stunt with a loop of "Rock Around the Clock" by Bill Haley & His Comets, on January 10, the station relaunched as KKNB, "B104", and began airing a Top 40 (CHR) format, competing with KFRX. In March 1993, it flipped to alternative rock as "The Planet". On June 20, 1996, KKNB shifted to modern adult contemporary as "The Point", and would network with its then-sister station KTNP in Omaha.

On November 24, 2000, at 8 a.m., after three days of stunting with a loop of "You're a Mean One, Mr. Grinch" by Thurl Ravenscroft, KKNB flipped back to Top 40/CHR as "Kiss 104 FM", and changed call letters to KSLI-FM.

=== The Blaze ===
On March 17, 2004, at noon, KIBZ and its active rock format known as "The Blaze" moved to 104.1 from 106.3 FM. After two days of simulcasting, the 106.3 frequency would stunt with construction sounds ahead of a flip to adult contemporary as KLMY on March 24.

Clear Channel Communications sold KIBZ to Three Eagles Communications on April 10, 2007. Three Eagles Communications sold KIBZ to Digity, LLC on February 10, 2014. The sale, which included KIBZ and 47 co-owned stations, was consummated on September 12, at a price of $66.5 million.

=== New transmitter and owners ===
On January 23, 2012, KIBZ was granted a Federal Communications Commission (FCC) construction permit to move to a new transmitter site, increase ERP to 40,000 watts and decrease HAAT to 116.1 meters. It later increased its HAAT to 187 meters (614 feet) while dropping power to 31,000 watts.

Effective February 25, 2016, Digity, LLC, and its 124 radio stations including KIBZ, were acquired by Alpha Media for $264 million.

In May 2025, Connoisseur Media announced its intent to acquire Alpha Media. The FCC approved the sale on August 13, 2025, and the sale was consummated on September 4.

In October 2026, Connoisseur Media announced that it had cut the entire local staff of the station, following the company announcing plans to acquire six radio stations in the Lincoln market from NRG Media in March.
