= KFRX =

Radio station in Lincoln, Nebraska

- Lincoln, Nebraska; United States
- Broadcast area: Lincoln metropolitan area
- Frequency: 106.3 MHz (HD Radio)
- Branding: 106.3 KFRX

Programming
- Language: English
- Format: Contemporary hit radio
- Subchannels: HD2: Mix 103.3 (adult hits); HD3: KFOR simulcast (news/talk)
- Affiliations: Premiere Networks

Ownership
- Owner: Connoisseur Media; (Alpha 3E License, LLC)
- Sister stations: KFOR; KIBZ; KTGL; KZKX

History
- First air date: 1958 (as KECK-FM)
- Former call signs: KECK-FM (1958–1974); KHAT-FM (1974–1990); KMXA (1990–1992); KIBZ (1992–2004); KLMY (2004–2007)

Technical information
- Licensing authority: FCC
- Facility ID: 57287
- Class: C1
- ERP: 100,000 watts
- HAAT: 214 meters (702 ft)
- Transmitter coordinates: 40°43′40″N 96°36′51.1″W
- Translator: HD2: 103.3 K277CA (Lincoln)

Links
- Public license information: Public file; LMS
- Webcast: Listen live
- Website: www.kfrxfm.com

KFRX (106.3 FM) is a radio station broadcasting a contemporary hit radio format. Licensed to Lincoln, Nebraska, United States, the station serves the Lincoln metropolitan area. The station is currently owned by Connoisseur Media, through licensee Alpha 3E License, LLC. KFRX's studios are located on Cornhusker Highway in Northeast Lincoln, while its transmitter is located at the master antenna farm at South 84th Street and Yankee Hill Road in the far southeast part of Lincoln with an effective radiated power (ERP) of 100,000 watts. KFRX also broadcasts in HD Radio.

== History ==
One of the longest-lived FM signals in Lincoln, the station started as KECK-FM (calls that were shared with its AM counterpart, which has since gone dark). It switched to the name KHAT in the mid-1970s. For much of the decade, it sported a country music and "progressive" country music format as KHAT. In the early 1980s, KHAT switched to an adult contemporary format. In July 1990, after a weekend of stunting with all-Phil Collins songs, KHAT was rebranded as "Mix 106", while retaining the adult contemporary format, and adopted new call letters KMXA. However, "Mix" was a failure in the ratings. On March 2, 1992, the station flipped to active rock as "106.3 The Blaze", under new call letters KIBZ. The format was an immense success.

As part of a major format shuffle, on March 17, 2004, KIBZ moved to 104.1 FM, displacing KSLI-FM's Top 40/CHR format. After two days of simulcasting, 106.3 began stunting with construction noises; this led to the debut of a new adult contemporary format under the "My 106.3" branding and callsign KLMY on March 24.

At 6 a.m. on September 18, 2007, following an evening of stunting, KLMY adopted KFRX's Top 40/CHR format and call letters. The move came as Three Eagles Communications purchased Clear Channel Communications' Lincoln stations, which forced Three Eagles to divest KRKR and KFRX's former 102.7 FM frequency to meet ownership limits. 102.7 FM, which became KBZR, was later sold to VSS Communications, and moved to the Omaha market as a Christian station.

In May 2025, Connoisseur Media announced its intent to acquire Alpha Media. The FCC approved the sale on August 13, 2025, and the sale was consummated on September 4.
