= KTGL =

Radio station in Beatrice, Nebraska

- Beatrice, Nebraska; United States
- Broadcast area: Lincoln, Nebraska
- Frequency: 92.9 MHz
- Branding: 92.9 The Eagle

Programming
- Format: Classic rock
- Affiliations: United Stations Radio Networks

Ownership
- Owner: Connoisseur Media; (Alpha 3E License, LLC)
- Sister stations: KFOR; KFRX; KIBZ; KZKX

History
- First air date: 1962
- Former call signs: KWBE-FM (1962–1979); KMAZ (1979–1987); KYMJ (September–October 1987)

Technical information
- Licensing authority: FCC
- Facility ID: 53141
- Class: C1
- ERP: 100,000 watts
- HAAT: 247 meters (810 ft)
- Transmitter coordinates: 40°31′6″N 96°46′7.1″W

Links
- Public license information: Public file; LMS
- Webcast: Listen live
- Website: www.ktgl.com

KTGL (92.9 FM) is a radio station broadcasting a classic rock format. Licensed to Beatrice, Nebraska, United States, the station serves the Lincoln area. The station is currently owned by Connoisseur Media. KTGL's studios are located on Cornhusker Highway in Northeast Lincoln, while its transmitter is located near Cortland.
