= Jack FM =

Radio network brand

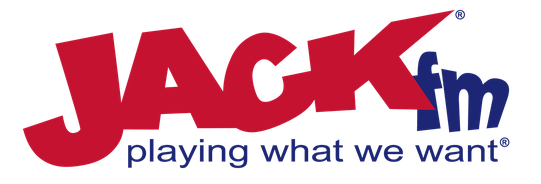
- Type: Adult hits radio network
- Country: Canada; European Union; United States; United Kingdom
- Owner: Sparknet Communications; Oxis Media in the EU; JACK Media (OXIS Media Ltd) in the UK
- Official website: jack.fm

Jack FM is a radio network brand that is licensed by Sparknet Communications, with the exception of the European Union where it is licensed by Oxis Media. It plays an adult hits format, in most cases not using DJs.

== Format characteristics ==
Stations using the "Jack" name are strictly licensed by SparkNet Communications. There are several terms that each station must agree to, including operating without disc jockeys for at least the first few months of the format. SparkNet has been protective of its format, unsuccessfully filing trademark infringement suits against Bonneville International for its use of the Jack FM service-marked slogan "Playing What We Want" and other similar phrases. For this reason, many stations airing a Jack-like format use slightly different slogans to avoid infringing on SparkNet's service marks: WBEN-FM in Philadelphia uses the tagline "Playing anything we feel like." On WLKO "102.9 The Lake" in Charlotte, North Carolina, the tagline is "We Play Anything". During its run as "Doug FM", WDRQ in Detroit used the line "We Play...Everything!"

Most stations in the United States use Howard Cogan and Andrew Anthony (best known as the voices of GEICO and EA Sports, respectively) as the voice of "Jack", while stations in Canada use Greg Beharrell. All Jack FM stations in the United Kingdom used former Blake's 7 actor Paul Darrow as the voice of Jack. In place of DJs, the Jack character makes sarcastic or ironic remarks and quips, often using self-deprecating humor.

Each September, all Jack FM stations ask listeners to visit a certain link to evaluate which songs should be played on the radio and which ones should be swapped.

== History ==
=== 2000–2003: Origins ===
"Perry launched JACK-FM on the internet in 2001 at jack.fm (where you can listen to it streaming for free at 128 kbps quality). His company, Big Sticks Broadcasting Corporation, owns the service marks to "JACK-FM" and "Playing What We Want" in the United States."

In 2000, the first originator of New York's Jack FM format was radio programmer Bob Perry, the president of Big Sticks Broadcasting Corp., on a United States–based Internet radio stream. Perry named the station after a fictitious persona, "Cadillac Jack" Garrett, "a hard-living radio cowboy". The back story created by Perry for the original web stream was that Garrett, a disc jockey who had worked many "big sticks", finally got his own radio station, and after years of being told what he was to play on-air was creating a station where the motto was "playing what we want".

Rogers Communications claims that the only thing taken without permission, for the Jack FM radio station, in Vancouver, British Columbia, Canada, was the name and the tagline. Pat Cardinal, one of the first Jack program directors, says that he was unaware of the type of music on the American website and that "Jack" was one of several names that were considered for the format. Rogers Communications came to an agreement with Perry for the use of the Jack FM name in Canada soon after the launch. The original web stream is still live to this day.

Jack was also inspired by the success of CHUM Limited's "Bob FM" brand on CFWM radio in Winnipeg. Program director Howard Kroeger was inspired to create Bob FM after hearing a mixtape at a friend's 40th birthday party. Other Canadian broadcasters copied the concept as well, adopting such brands as Corus Entertainment's "Dave FM" and "Joe FM". In 2003, an Ottawa station launched "Frank FM" as a one-day Halloween prank. (The prank's name was possibly also inspired by the Canadian satirical magazine Frank, and probably the New England stations known as Frank FM.)

First Jack FM logo, often used on Infinity-CBS stations.

Beginning in late 2002, several Canadian radio stations owned by Rogers Communications started using the format. The first Jack station was Vancouver's CKLG-FM, which reached the top of the city's BBM radio ratings. The format was consequently adopted on other Rogers stations in 2002 and 2003. The format proved popular in many markets where it was introduced, although its success was not always as dramatic as it had been in Vancouver.

=== 2004–2005: Introduction to United States and controversies ===
In 2004, SparkNet Communications, the owner of the Jack FM and "Playing What We Want" trademarks outside of Canada, started to license the Jack FM trademark in the United States. NRC Broadcasting's KJAC in Denver was the first U.S. station to adopt the "Jack FM" format on April 14, 2004. (It has since switched to a public radio adult album alternative format.)

The success of Jack caused a cloning effect, with some stations using the names of famous local figures, landmarks, or symbols to promote their version of the format. These variations have included WABZ "Abe FM" in Springfield, Illinois, named for Abraham Lincoln; WBEN-FM "Ben FM" in Philadelphia, named for Benjamin Franklin; "100.5 FM Louie" in Louisville, Kentucky; "96.7 Steve FM" WLTY in Columbia, South Carolina, named after University of South Carolina football coach Steve Spurrier; WCFF "The Chief 92.5 FM" in Champaign, Illinois, named for the controversial symbol of the University of Illinois, Chief Illiniwek; WARH in St. Louis, known as "106.5 The Arch," named for the Gateway Arch, and even a body of water like "106-5 The Lake" WHLK in Cleveland, named for Lake Erie.

On July 29, 2005, Rawlco's CKCK-FM in Regina, Saskatchewan, became the first non-Rogers station in Canada to directly license the Jack FM brand rather than adopting an alternate name.

On May 4, 2005, at 11 a.m., WQSR, an oldies station in Baltimore, changed its format to Jack FM. Listeners and staffers alike were surprised by the sudden change because many of the station's long-time air personalities were considered Baltimore institutions. WQSR received a large amount of negative publicity regarding the format change. Popular former WQSR personality Steve Rouse later became the morning show host at sister station 101.9 WLIF.

Logo used on Cumulus and iHeartMedia owned stations.

The introduction of Jack FM in New York City generated the most negative publicity of any market that switched a station to the format. On June 3, 2005, at 5:00 p.m., WCBS-FM, an oldies station in New York City, flipped to Jack FM without any prior warning. The switch to the format, with no DJs and few songs before 1980 was termed The Day the Music Died by some New Yorkers and has drawn criticism even from non-listeners of the station. The sudden firing of DJs of historic renown such as Cousin Brucie, Ron Lundy and Harry Harrison was noted in the press. In a partial nod to this controversy, on June 14, 2005, the station announced that it would tweak the format to include a handful of 1950s and early 1960s songs as well as performers such as Frank Sinatra — elements not typical of the Jack format. However, a later update retracted this and songs from before the late 1960s were no longer played.

One prominent reaction to the format change came in the form of a derogatory comment from the city's mayor. According to the New York Post, mayor Michael Bloomberg responded to the change by declaring he would "never listen to that fucking CBS radio ever again" (the quote was censored in the newspaper). The new Jack station quickly picked up on this, using its trademark sarcasm: "Hey, Mayor Bloomberg. I heard you took a shot at us in the Post. What's with all the swearin' like a sailor? Fleet Week is over. It's just music." Initially, Arbitron ratings showed a sharp decline and while ratings did improve, they never surpassed the levels that WCBS-FM had before the format switch.

As a result, on July 6, 2007, WCBS-FM announced it would drop Jack FM and restore the station's old format on July 12 with an updated classic hits approach, a move attributed mostly to the newly appointed CBS Radio CEO Dan Mason. Three of the fired DJs and staff (Dan Taylor, Bob Shannon, and Mr. G) returned to the station, along with newsman Al Meredith (who had stayed at the station during Jack FM doing his Sunday morning public affairs show), as well as DJ Pat St. John who had previously left CBS-FM for Q104.3 about a year before the flip to Jack. Steve O'Brien, a weekend and fill-in DJ at the time of the format change, also returned in a similar capacity in 2008. For a time, the Jack FM format was renamed ToNY. It was available through WCBS-FM's HD2 subchannel, and via an internet stream.

On the same day that WCBS-FM flipped to Jack FM, another station owned by CBS, WJMK, an oldies station in Chicago, changed formats to Jack FM as well. The change at WJMK didn't attract as much attention as the WCBS-FM flip, but it still drew the ire of its listeners. Just as with WCBS-FM in New York, WJMK Chicago ended the Jack FM format and reverted to classic hits in 2011.

On July 5, 2005, it was announced that Bohn & Associates Media and Wall Media formed SparkNet Communications L.P. as the exclusive international licensor and owner of the Jack FM format. SparkNet has, in turn, licensed the format to Dial Global for satellite-based syndication to stations in U.S. markets outside the 40 largest. This satellite-fed Jack became active in October 2005, and now serves many of the smaller Jack stations, such as those in Evansville, Indiana, and Knoxville, Tennessee.

In late September 2005, CJAQ-FM in Toronto, announced that it would become the first DJ-less station in Canada. Pat Cardinal, general manager and program director of the station, said "The move came as a result of listener feedback. The audience has been telling us that they want no DJs on Jack. They want more music." When it first launched, 92.5 Jack FM operated without disc jockeys in an effort to establish the "Playing What We Want" concept, which was new to Toronto. DJs were introduced within weeks. In November 2005, Cardinal defended his decision in an interview with Michael Hainsworth of Report on Business Television and stated why he doesn't see commercial-free iPods and satellite radio as a threat to a non-DJ format.

In October 2005, Entravision Radio launched a Spanish-language version of the Jack format dubbed "José" with the "We Play What We Want" tagline translated into Spanish as "Toca lo que Quiere". "José" went live on six FM and AM stations in Sacramento, Stockton, and Modesto, California; Albuquerque, New Mexico; and Denver, Colorado. The "José" stations have no affiliation with Jack, SparkNet Communications, or Bob Perry.

On October 25, 2005, Infinity Broadcasting, part of CBS, announced that it would be replacing Howard Stern with Jack FM on some of its stations. Stern left terrestrial radio for Sirius Satellite Radio in late 2005.

=== Since 2006: North American format changes, international expansion ===
Following the format's mid-2000s growth throughout North America, Jack FM continued to expand into smaller markets across the continent. However, in many cities the novelty wore off, and in the late 2000s a number of Jack stations modified their playlists drastically or flipped to other formats outright.

In May 2006, the playlist of CJAQ-FM in Toronto evolved into a mainstream rock format. The 1980s top-40 acts such as Madonna, Duran Duran, Kim Wilde, Cyndi Lauper, and Falco were dropped in favor of an all-rock playlist, and the station's slogan changed to "Toronto's Best Rock Variety". However, In June 2009, the station flipped back to Contemporary Hits. It returned to its former "Kiss" branding as well as adopted its current call letters. Similarly, Rawlco-owned CKCK-FM (the only non-Rogers operated Jack FM station) in Regina, Saskatchewan, adopted a classic rock direction in September, changing its slogan from the traditional "Playing What We Want" to "The Greatest Rock Of All Time" and adding announcers to its afternoon drive time show. In 2010, the tagline was changed again to "Regina's Greatest Hits".

In October 2006, the UK's first Jack FM format station won a broadcast licence for the Oxford area. 106 Jack FM Oxford started broadcasting at 1:06 p.m. BST on October 18, 2007. On December 2, 2009, Bristol radio station Original FM changed to Jack FM after requesting a format change with OFCOM. Two further Jack FM stations were planned on DAB digital radio from 2008 for Northamptonshire and Northeast Wales and West Cheshire but by August 2009 were a year late with no indication of an ETA. In addition the Oxfordshire Jack was to have been relayed to a wider area. RadioToday reported The Coast was to flip to become JACK FM on July 4, 2011.

In January 2007, KAJR in California's Coachella Valley launched as a "Jack FM" affiliate in a region unable to receive the KCBS-FM signal from Los Angeles, 100 miles (160 km) to the west. Jack did not last long. By February 1, 2010, that station became soft adult contemporary-formatted KJJZ.

On October 22, 2007, WJMK in Chicago announced that radio personality Steve Dahl would be morning drive personality as of November 5, the first personality on the station since it went to the Jack format. In March 2011, WJMK dropped the Jack format in favor of classic hits as "K-Hits", featuring 1960s to 1980s music. Eddie & Jobo (Ed Volkman and Joe Bohannon, former morning hosts at co-owned WBBM-FM) took over the morning show.

On June 29, 2012, it was announced that KJQN in Salt Lake City would drop the "Jack FM" format on July 16, 2012, and begin to simulcast the talk radio format of KLO.

On August 2, 2013, KFMB-FM, the Jack FM station in San Diego, began restricting access to its online stream to listeners within the city of San Diego proper. This move by program director Mike O'Reilly drew the ire of fans who live outside the city limits, including the large U.S. military community stationed locally and overseas. O'Reilly explained his rationale, citing a new Arbitron policy on how online listening is measured:

Our radio industry is continually adapting to changing metrics, which are sometimes out of our control within our competitive landscape. I understand your frustration and I can assure you this decision to restrict our streaming efforts to San Diego was based on multiple factors including the licensing issues outlined on our website. In addition, radio stations that do not 100% simulcast their signals online are essentially competing with themselves. Technically they are considered two separate radio stations in the way they are rated. By restricting our signal to San Diego only, our online stream and our air signal at 100.7FM will be considered one unified station.

— Mike O'Reilly, KFMB-FM program director

KFMB-FM achieved this effect by restricting the signal based on the IP address of the device on which a listener streamed the station. However, fans within the city of San Diego were prevented from hearing the station as well. In addition, the station charged for access to its local morning radio show on podcast in September 2013. On November 17, 2015, KFMB-FM dropped its regular Jack FM programming and began stunting with all-Christmas music as "Jack Frost"; The station launched a mainstream rock format on January 4, 2016.

On February 28, 2014, CFLT-FM in Halifax, Nova Scotia, flipped formats to Jack FM becoming the latest Rogers radio station to adopt the Jack branding. Meanwhile, in February 2015, another Rogers station, CHTT-FM in Victoria, British Columbia, dropped the Jack FM format and flipped to contemporary hit radio (CHR) as "Kiss 103.1". That station, however, returned to Jack FM programming on August 15, 2019.

On December 26, 2017, at midnight, KSAJ-FM in Topeka, Kansas, flipped formats from oldies to Jack FM.

The Jack FM format is distributed via satellite in the United States and internationally. Within the US, distributed originally by ABC Radio and later acquired by Dial Global (now Westwood One). In September 2019, Skyview Networks took over the US distribution rights from Westwood One. US military radio station Armed Forces Network, Afghanistan broadcasts Jack FM, having adopted the format on August 1, 2011, as a way to expand the playlist and reduce operational personnel.

== Jack FM stations ==
Radio stations are listed here if they specifically use the Jack FM brand. Stations branded as Bob FM are listed on that article; stations using alternate brands are listed at adult hits.

=== Canada ===
Location	Call sign	Frequency	Owner	Notes
Regina, Saskatchewan	CKCK-FM	94.5 FM	Rawlco Communications	only Jack FM station in Canada not owned by Rogers Sports & Media
London, Ontario	CHST-FM	102.3 FM	Rogers Sports & Media	
Vancouver, British Columbia	CJAX-FM	96.9 FM	Rogers Sports & Media	
Calgary, Alberta	CJAQ-FM	96.9 FM	Rogers Sports & Media	
Dartmouth, Nova Scotia	CFLT-FM	92.9 FM	Rogers Sports & Media	serves Halifax market
Victoria, British Columbia	CHTT-FM	103.1 FM	Rogers Sports & Media	Was re-branded as Top 40/CHR (KiSS 103.1) from February 24, 2015, to August 15, 2019.
Medicine Hat, Alberta	CJCY-FM	102.1 FM	Rogers Sports & Media	

==== Former stations ====
Location	Call sign	Frequency	Owner	Notes
Toronto, Ontario	CJAQ-FM	92.5 FM	Rogers Media	Became Top 40/CHR CKIS-FM (KiSS 92.5) in June 2009, although it was a mainstream rock station from 2006 to 2009.
Orillia, Ontario	CICX-FM	105.9 FM	Larche Communications	Became country (KICX 106) in 2008.
Smiths Falls, Ontario	CJET-FM	92.3 FM	My Broadcasting Corporation	Became 92.3 WOW FM on August 1, 2025.

=== United States ===
Location	Call sign	Frequency	Owner	Notes
Parker, Arizona	KPKR	95.7 FM	Arizona's Hometown Radio Group	
Paragould, Arkansas	KDRS-FM	107.1 FM	Mor Media	
Los Angeles, California	KCBS-FM	93.1 FM	Audacy, Inc.	
Susanville, California	KAJK	96.3 FM	Huth Broadcasting	
Lake Worth, Florida	WJBW	1000 AM	Little Dog Media Group	Simulcast on 93.7 W229DG. Moved from WWRF
Vero Beach, Florida	WJKD	99.7 FM	Vero Beach Broadcasters	
Boise, Idaho	KJOT	105.1 FM	Lotus Communications	Debuted March 15, 2021
Decatur, Illinois	WEJT	105.1 FM	Cromwell Radio Group	
Tell City, Indiana	WTCJ	1230 AM	Cromwell Radio Group	Simulcast on W227CO (93.3 FM), W254CC (98.7 FM), and W294CG (106.7 FM)
Burlingame, Kansas	KSAJ-FM	98.5 FM	Connoisseur Media	Debuted December 26, 2017
Elizabethtown, Kentucky	WRZI	107.3 FM	Commonwealth Broadcasting	
Munfordville, Kentucky	WBGN	102.3 FM	Commonwealth Broadcasting	
Baltimore, Maryland	WQSR	102.7 FM	iHeartMedia	
Kalamazoo, Michigan	WVFM	106.5 FM	Midwest Communications	Debuted February 24, 2021, picking up the format after WZOX 96.5 FM Portage dropped the Jack FM branding
Minneapolis-St. Paul, Minnesota	KZJK	104.1 FM	Audacy, Inc.	
Redwood Falls, Minnesota	KLGR-FM	97.7 FM	Connoisseur Media	
Columbia/Boonville, Missouri	KWJK	93.1 FM/103.5 FM	Billings Broadcasting	
Kansas City, Missouri	K273BZ	102.5 FM	Cumulus Media	
Kansas City, Missouri	KMJK	107.3 FM	Cumulus Media	
Missoula, Montana	KYJK	105.9 FM	Simmons Media Ventures	
Elko, Nevada	KLKO	93.7 FM	Elko Broadcasting	Formerly Bob FM
Fayetteville, North Carolina	WFLB	96.5 FM	Beasley Media Group	Debuted August 8th, 2024, replacing BOB FM.
Fargo, North Dakota	KRWK	101.9 FM	Midwest Communications	Formerly Mix 101.9
Williston, North Dakota	KDSR	101.1 FM	The Marks Group	Formerly Bob FM
Loretto, Pennsylvania	WYUP	1400 AM	Lightner Communications	Simulcast on W296ED (107.1 FM) and W267CM (101.3)
Sisseton, South Dakota	KJKQ	99.5 FM	Armada Media	
Dyersburg, Tennessee	WASL	100.1 FM	Burks Broadcasting	
Knoxville, Tennessee	WNFZ	94.3 FM	Midwest Communications	
Nashville, Tennessee	WCJK	96.3 FM	Midwest Communications	
Austin, Texas	KJFK	1490 AM	Township Media, LLC	Simulcast on K242DE (96.3 FM)
Dallas, Texas	KJKK	100.3 FM	Audacy, Inc.	
Llano, Texas	KJFK-FM	96.3 FM	Township Media, LLC	
Longview/Jacksonville, Texas	KOOI	106.5 FM	Connoisseur Media	
Temple/Killeen, Texas	KLTD	101.7 FM	Townsquare Media	
Victoria, Texas	KTXN-FM	98.7 FM	Broadcast Equities Texas	Operated by Townsquare Media
Maeser, Utah	KCUA	92.5 FM	Country Gold Broadcasting	
Toquerville, Utah	KZYN	104.1 FM	Redrock Media	
Aberdeen, Washington	KSWW/K263BE	102.1 FM HD2/100.5 FM	Jodesha Broadcasting	
Seattle, Washington	KJAQ	96.5 FM	iHeartMedia	
Wenatchee, Washington	KKRV/K232ED	104.7 FM HD3/94.3 FM	Connoisseur Media	
Neenah/Menasha, Wisconsin	WYDR	94.3 FM	Midwest Communications	
Rhinelander, Wisconsin	WRHN	100.1 FM	NRG Media	Debuted September 1, 2015
Hudson, Wyoming	KTUG	105.1 FM	MORCOM Bdcstg	Debuted November 1, 2016
Rock Springs, Wyoming	KSIT	99.7 FM	WyoRadio	Debuted January 1, 2017
Vista West/Casper, Wyoming	KRVK	107.9 FM	Townsquare Media	

==== Former stations ====
Location	Call sign	Frequency	Owner	Notes
Mobile, Alabama	WYOK	104.1 FM	Cumulus Media	Switched format to CHR as WABD in February 2012, now Urban AC as WDLT-FM.
Kodiak, Alaska	KRXX	101.1 FM	Kodiak Island Broadcasting	Now as a hot AC format.
Vilonia, Arkansas	KCON	92.7 FM	East Arkansas Broadcasters	Switched format to classic hits on April 23, 2026.
Bakersfield, California	KRJK	97.3 FM	Buck Owens Broadcasting	Switched format to country music on October 14, 2016.
Chico, California	KHEX	100.3 FM	Huth Broadcasting	Switched format to classic country on March 2, 2017.
Fresno, California	KFJK	105.9 FM	Cumulus Media	Switched to a simulcast of KMJ in March 2009.
Palm Springs, California	KAJR	95.9 FM	RM Broadcasting	Switched format to soft AC in 2010.
Sacramento, California	KQJK	93.7 FM	iHeartMedia	Switched format to classic rock on April 3, 2017.
San Diego, California	KFMB-FM	100.7 FM	Tegna, Inc.	Dropped most pre-2000 titles in early 2014, assuming a modern rock format but retaining the branding. Switched to mainstream rock on January 4, 2016, as "KFM-BFM". Returned to adult hits in December 2018 and changed call letters to KFBG in April 2020.
Denver, Colorado	KJAC	105.5 FM	NRC Broadcasting	Switched format to sports talk in 2012 as an affiliate of ESPN Radio, and currently features a AAA format. Was the first station in the United States to license the "Jack FM" brand.
Denver, Colorado	KDHT-FM	107.1 FM	Max Media	Switched format to modern rock in 2014, then to classic hip hop.
Steamboat Springs, Colorado	KIDN-FM	95.9 FM	AlwaysMountainTime	Switched format to hot AC in 2010.
Seaford, Delaware	WSUX	1280 AM	Seaford Media	Switched to Spanish-language programming in August 2017.
Jacksonville, Florida	WWJK	107.3 FM	iHeartMedia	Rebranded as "107.3 Jacksonville" on April 18, 2017, then rebranded again as "107.3 The River" on May 26, 2017.
Lake Worth, Florida	WWRF	1380 AM	Little Dog Media Group	Switched format to mainstream rock on August 12, 2026.
Chicago, Illinois	WJMK	104.3 FM	CBS Radio	Switched format to classic hits on March 14, 2011.
Effingham, Illinois	WHQQ	98.9 FM	Cromwell Radio Group	Switched format to sports talk in 2014.
Ottawa, Illinois	WRKX	95.3 FM	NRG Media	Switched format to classic rock on September 1, 2025.
Peoria, Illinois	WHPI	101.1 FM	Advanced Media Partners, LLC	Switched format to sports talk on June 6, 2018, as an affiliate of ESPN Radio, assuming the WZPN callsign from 96.5 on June 26, 2018. Was a simulcast of that frequency until September 2020, when WHPI became a simulcast of CHR station WPIA.
Evansville, Indiana	WEJK	107.1 FM	The Original Company	Switched format to classic hits in 2014.
Indianapolis, Indiana	WJJK	104.5 FM	Cumulus Media	Switched format to classic hits in September 2006, then dropped the Jack FM brand that December.
Vincennes, Indiana	WFML	96.7 FM	The Vincennes University Foundation	Switched format to adult contemporary on April 2, 2017.
Davenport, Iowa	KQCJ	93.9 FM	Virden Broadcasting	Switched format to alternative rock on April 22, 2020.
Larned, Kansas	KSOB	96.7 FM	Rocking M Media	Dropped the branding in favor of Bob FM in 2007. Switched to classic country in 2013.
Lexington, Kentucky	WLXX	101.5 FM	Cumulus Media	Went silent in March 2025.
Louisville, Kentucky	WXMA	102.3 FM	Alpha Media	Switched format to soft adult contemporary on August 30, 2022.
Lake Charles, Louisiana	KBIU	103.3 FM	Cumulus Media	Switched format to adult contemporary on March 23, 2012.
Kalamazoo, Michigan	WZOX	96.5 FM	Midwest Communications	Switched format to CHR in 2021.
Hazlehurst, Mississippi	WDXO	92.9 FM	Telesouth Communications	Switched to classic hip hop in February 2024.
Jackson, Mississippi	WJXN-FM	100.9 FM	Flinn Broadcasting Corporation	Switched to classic country on March 1, 2014. Re-debuted February 19, 2021, before Alpha Media's LMA expired in January 2023 in favor of Air1.
West Plains, Missouri	KSPQ	93.9 FM	Missouri Ozark Radio Network	Switched format to classic rock on April 1, 2016.
Holdrege, Nebraska	KMTY	97.7 FM	Legacy Communications, LLC	Switched format to country on June 17, 2013.
Imperial, Nebraska	KADL	102.9 FM	Armada Media - McCook, Inc.	Switched format to classic hits on April 1, 2024.
Las Vegas, Nevada	KKJJ	100.5 FM	CBS Radio	Switched to a simulcast of KXNT in August 2010.
Buffalo, New York	WBUF	92.9 FM	Townsquare Media	Reverted to mainstream rock/active rock in November 2020.
New York, New York	WCBS-FM	101.1 FM	CBS Radio	Reverted to classic hits on July 12, 2007. The Jack FM format was moved to 101.1-HD2, dropped the branding in 2008 for "Tony FM", and eventually was dropped altogether in 2012.
Oklahoma City, Oklahoma	KOJK	97.3 FM	Tyler Media	Flipped to country on March 8, 2010, then to Catholic programming on February 28, 2013.
Dayton, Ohio	WGTZ	92.9 FM	Connoisseur Media	Switched format to classic hits on October 2, 2025.
Worthington, Ohio	WJKR	98.9 FM	Salem Media Group	Format switched to talk radio following an ownership change on November 1, 2012. The Jack FM format and call letters resurfaced in July 2013 at the former WMNI-FM.
Worthington, Ohio	WJKR	103.9 FM	North American Broadcasting	Format switched to country radio.
Apollo, Pennsylvania	WXJX	910 AM	LHTC Media, Inc.	Format switched to oldies on February 9, 2021.
Johnstown, Pennsylvania	WKGE	850 AM	Zip2, LLC	License cancelled on August 7, 2024.
Latrobe, Pennsylvania	WCNS	1480 AM	LHTC Media, Inc.	Format switched to oldies on February 9, 2021.
Philipsburg, Pennsylvania	WPHB	1260 AM	Matt Lightner	Switched format to classic country on January 3, 2023.
Pierre, South Dakota	KLXS-FM	95.3 FM	Riverfront Broadcasting LLC	Switched format to country in 2012.
Greenville, South Carolina	W258CB	99.5 FM	SummitMedia	Switched format to classic hits in 2021.
Knoxville, Tennessee (Maryville/Norris)	WQJK	95.7 FM	Midwest Communications	Dropped the format in August 2012 in favor of CHR, then active rock, and currently is classic country.
Knoxville, Tennessee (Maryville/Norris)	WRJK	106.7 FM	Blue Ridge Broadcasting Company	Ended a WQJK simulcast in February 2012 when the station was leased, then sold, to the Billy Graham Evangelistic Association and assumed a CCM format.
Amarillo, Texas	KPRF	98.7 FM	Townsquare Media	Switched format to classic rock on June 29, 2017. Currently operates with classic hits.
Bryan, Texas	KJXJ	103.9 FM	Brazos Valley Communications, LTD.	Switched format to mainstream rock on September 20, 2010.
Holliday, Texas	KWFB	100.9 FM	Falls Radio, LLC	Switched from Bob FM to simply 100.9 FM on February 8, 2022. Switched to the international Jack FM name on March 6, 2022. Switched format to Santa FM for the holiday season, then finally reverting back to the Bob FM name and format on January 1, 2024.
Houston, Texas	KHJK	103.7 FM	Educational Media Foundation	Switched format to AAA in May 2009. Sold by Cumulus Media to Educational Media Foundation in 2012, which operates it today as an Air 1 affiliate.
Midland/Odessa, Texas	KFZX	102.1 FM	ICA Communications	Switched format to classic rock in 2010.
San Antonio, Texas	KJXK	102.7 FM	Connoisseur Media	Switched to Adult hits on January 5, 2026.
Salt Lake City, Utah	KJQN	103.1 FM	KLO Broadcasting	Switched to a simulcast of KLO in 2012, then to adult contemporary, and currently is classic hits.
Richmond, Virginia	WJSR	100.9 FM	SummitMedia	Switched format to classic hits in March 2021.
Fisher, West Virginia	WQWV	103.7 FM	Thunder Associates, LLC	Switched format to classic hits in 2019.
Westover, West Virginia	WZST	100.9 FM	Spectrum Radio	Switched format to conservative talk in 2025.
Wheeling, West Virginia	WYJK	96.5 FM	FM Radio Licenses	Switched format to sports talk and active rock in 2014.
Park Falls, Wisconsin	WPFP	980 AM	Civic Media	Rebranded to "103.1 Trail Mix" in February 2024.
Wausau, Wisconsin	WOZZ	94.7 FM	WRIG, Inc.	Switched format to active rock in July 2024.
Lake Worth, Florida	WWRF	1380 AM	Glades Media Group	Simulcast on W234DA (94.7 FM) and W245AY (96.9 FM) Moved to WJBW

=== United Kingdom ===
In the UK, the Jack FM stations were initially licensed to OXIS Media in 2007 by Sparknet Communications in Canada. OXIS Media, who manage the brand, was set up by Clive Dickens, Ian Walker, Donnach O’Driscoll and Adrian Robinson, who had been involved with establishing Virgin Radio (now Absolute). A number of local stations were set up, with the stations being individually run by Passion Radio in Oxfordshire or Madejski Communications Limited elsewhere. By 2021, the Oxfordshire stations were run by JACK Media Oxfordshire Ltd, a division of the JACK Radio Group/JACK Media, with the others by JACK Media National Ltd, with the JACK Radio Group being ultimately run by OXIS Media Ltd.

Discontinued:

- JACKfm (Oxford, Oxfordshire – previously 106 Jack FM) launched on October 18, 2007 – rebranded to Greatest Hits Radio on October 30, 2023.
- JACK2 Hits (launched as Jack FM 2 in Oxfordshire in August 2013) – closed down October 29, 2023.
- JACK3 Chill (launched in May 2017 as Jack FM 3) – rebranded to Hits Radio on October 30, 2023.
- Union JACK Radio (broadcasting nationwide on DAB, a music station with comedy clips) (owner Jack Radio National went into administration).
- Union JACK Dance (broadcasting nationwide on DAB, a dance music station) (owner Jack Radio National went into administration).
- Union JACK Rock (broadcasting nationwide, playing only British rock music tracks) (owner Jack Radio National went into administration).
- JACK Radio (broadcasting nationwide on DAB, a music station playing only tracks by female artists, which was launched in 2018 and lasted for two years, until the slot was given over to Union JACK Dance).
- Hertfordshire – 106 Jack FM (Hertfordshire), existed from May 10, 2010, until rebranded as Bob FM Hertfordshire on March 10, 2014.
- Bristol – 106 Jack FM (Bristol) launched at 6:00 am December 2, 2009, with no prior warning, following a staged on-air argument and station hijacking of Original 106.5 the previous day. Rebranded on April 1, 2015, to Sam FM.
- Swindon, Wiltshire – Swindon – (previously More Radio) launched at 06:00 a.m. on May 28, 2012, rebranded on April 1, 2015, to Sam FM.
- Reading – 107 Jack FM (Berkshire) – (previously Reading 107) launched on March 2, 2014, the same day as the Reading Half Marathon, rebranded to Sam FM and The Breeze in August 2017
- Hampshire – 106 Jack FM (South Coast) – (previously The Coast 106), launched on July 4, 2011, rebranded on April 1, 2015, to Sam FM it returned to DAB as Jack FM In 2016

=== Austria ===
- Vienna – Radio 8

=== Russia ===
- Moscow – KEKC 89.9
- Saint Petersburg – KEKC 91.1

== See also ==
- Jack
- BOB fm Hertfordshire
- Hank FM
- Nash FM, a peer specializing in country music
- Frank FM, a similar station
