= WASL =

WASL may refer to:

- WASL (FM), a radio station (100.1 FM) licensed to Dyersburg, Tennessee, United States
- WASL (gene), a human gene called Wiskott-Aldrich syndrome-like
- West Asia Super League (WASL)
- Washington Assessment of Student Learning
- Western Australian Super League, an ice hockey league

== See also ==
- Al Wasl (disambiguation)
- Wasl, a village in Yemen
