= KQZR =

- Hayden, Colorado; United States
- Frequency: 107.3 MHz
- Branding: The Reel 95.5 & 107.3

Programming
- Format: Classic rock

Ownership
- Owner: Patricia MacDonald Garber and Peter Benedetti; (AlwaysMountainTime, LLC)
- Sister stations: KFMU, KIDN

History
- First air date: 2000 (as KRMR)
- Former call signs: KBDU (1998–2000); KRMR (2000–2006); KTRJ (2006–2007)

Technical information
- Licensing authority: FCC
- Facility ID: 84270
- Class: C2
- ERP: 29,000 watts
- HAAT: 198 meters (650 ft)
- Transmitter coordinates: 40°31′16.00″N 107°17′46.00″W
- Translator: 95. K238AB (Steamboat Springs)

Links
- Public license information: Public file; LMS
- Website: alwaysmountaintime.com/kqzr/

KQZR (107.3 FM, "The Reel") is a radio station broadcasting a classic rock music format. Licensed to Hayden, Colorado, the station is currently owned by Patricia MacDonald Garber and Peter Benedetti, through licensee AlwaysMountainTime, LLC.

== History ==
The station was assigned the call letters KBDU on 20 April 1998. On 10 February 2000, the station changed its call sign to KRMR; on 9 October 2006 it changed to KTRJ, and on 24 December 2007 changed again to the current KQZR.

In the 1980s, KQZR was owned by Tri-county Broadcasting Corporation and broadcast Country-Western format from studios in Craig, CO. Tri-county was one-third owned by Doyle Berry, a Louisiana businessman and CEO of Berry Bros General Contractors in Meeker, one-third owned by Mr. Jim Wilson Sr., a bank president from Meeker, and one-third owned by an East coast conglomerate. The transmitter site located on Meeker mountain, was the tallest transmitter site in the Continental US and broadcast at 100,000 watts. The station ceased operating after three years, due mainly to the high cost of transporting electricity up the side of Meeker mountain. The general manager of KQZR at that time was Mike Huning and Program Director Don Nelson. The reliable reception pattern stretched south to Rifle, CO; west to Rangely, CO and Ogden, Utah; north to mid-Wyoming and Casper. The station's motto was interchangeable "The Energy Brand of the Radio Frontier" and "The Radio Brand of the Energy Frontier". At its peak, the station employed twenty-two and had an Arbitron ranking of No. 1 against four other radio stations. This No. 1 position in the ratings was due to several factors: on-air personalities; popular choice of artists like Reba McEntire, Oak Ridge Boys, Christopher Cross, Eddie Rabbitt, Patsy Cline, Crystal Gayle, Barbara Mandrell, Creedence Clearwater Revival and Linda Ronstadt; as well as aggressive marketing campaigns. One such marketing campaign with City Market grocery was to place a registration card in each grocery sack that entitled a winning registrant to a cash prize (multiples of $102.50). A common on-air theme was the "Z-one oh two Block Party Weekend" where a sequence of three songs from the same artist was played back-to-back-to-back with three artists (9 songs) played in a row with no commercials.

On January 24, 1982, during the NFL Super Bowl of 1982, some oil company employees using snowmobiles on Meeker mountain broke into the transmitter building and shutdown the transmitter so that they could receive the television signal during the game. (The powerful 100,000 watt transmitter blocked out all other air wave signals on the mountain.) The station staff often furloughed at Sleepy Cat Guest Ranch where libations were had all around. The station studios in Craig featured the first color weather radar on the Western slope with marketing agreements to Denver television stations for a signal feed. The studios were connected to the transmitter site on Meeker mountain through a state-of-the-art microwave two-way twelve-channel telemetry radio-telegraph system. The station's billing system ran off a Hewlett-Packard HP3000 computer system, also the first automated billing system on the Western slope of Colorado for a small broadcast station. Another first for this market was the implementation of automated programming through a quad Revox A77 reel-to-reel automation system.

At this time, KQZR broadcast on 102.5 FM (often recalled as "Zee-one oh two!") 24 hours per day and provided a fully staffed full-time news department with roving reporters, one of which was the well-known political reporter Sarah McClendon. Ms. McClendon provided weekly news reports directly from Capitol Hill fed through a state-of-the-art Vocoder over normal, long-distance phone lines from the fall of 1981 through 1982 covering topics of national importance that impacted people on the Western slope. During one Presidential press conference in October 1981, Ms. McClendon announced she was from KQZR, Craig, CO before asking Margaret Tutwiler about the effect additional gun control laws would have on hunters in Colorado.

KQZR broadcast the Dial Global Classic Rock format until November 2012 when it resumed locally programmed KQZR "The REEL," also known as "Classic Rock for the Yampa Valley," or more commonly, "The Yampa Valley's Classic Rock". The library includes a wide variety of classics, deeper cuts and new songs from core artist like The Beatles, The Rolling Stones, Crosby Still Nash & Young, Tom Petty and more. The KQZR morning show Mon-Fri was hosted by radio personality Raymond Gabriel, a.k.a. "Ray Ray on The Reel" featuring the award-winning Gyro Hero Story of the Day, a local favorite.
