= WLKD =

Radio station in Minocqua, Wisconsin

- Minocqua, Wisconsin; United States
- Frequency: 1570 kHz
- Branding: The Lake

Programming
- Format: Soft oldies

Ownership
- Owner: NRG Media (sale to Midwest Communications pending); (Raven License Sub, LLC)
- Sister stations: WHDG; WMQA-FM; WOBT; WRHN; WRLO-FM

History
- First air date: August 1, 1978
- Former call signs: WFBZ (1978–1985); WMYM (1985–1992); WMQA (1992–1999)

Technical information
- Licensing authority: FCC
- Facility ID: 55210
- Class: B
- Power: 5,000 watts day; 500 watts night
- Transmitter coordinates: 45°49′13.00″N 89°43′27.00″W

Links
- Public license information: Public file; LMS
- Website: www.am1570wlkd.com

WLKD (1570 AM) is a radio station in Minocqua, Wisconsin, United States. The station is owned by NRG Media through Raven License Sub, LLC.

1570 AM is a Mexican clear-channel frequency, on which XERF-AM in Ciudad Acuña is the dominant Class A station.

== History ==
WLKD went on the air on August 1, 1978 as WFBZ, playing big band music. The station for only a short period of time became a simulcast of the album-oriented rock/country music format of its FM sister 95.9 WWMH (now WMQA-FM) before discontinuing its simulcast in 1979 when WWMH flipped its format to MOR. At the same time, WFBZ flipped to beautiful music for the next two-and-a-half years. Both WFBZ and WWMH had a couple of changes throughout the early 1980s. WFBZ dropped the beautiful music format in 1981 and flipped to MOR, WWMH dropped MOR for Top 40 in 1982, and then WFBZ flipped from MOR to adult contemporary the following year in 1983. On April 1, 1985, WFBZ changed its calls to WMYM (We Make Your Memories) and flipped to an Adult Standards format programmed separately from the FM. At the same time, WFBZ's former adult contemporary format went over to WWMH.

On February 1, 1992, the station changed its call sign to WMQA and returned to simulcasting with its FM sister station, which concurrently became WMQA-FM; with the FM station's adult contemporary music format. The FM station has been running its adult contemporary format since 1985. On March 19, 1999, the calls changed to the current WLKD and 1570 AM adopted an adult standards format for the third time in its history, this time featuring programming from the Music of Your Life network. (The AC format continued on WMQA-FM until late August 2008 when that station changed its format to Oldies.) WLKD dropped Music of Your Life in favor of ESPN Radio programming in the fall of 2004 and entered into a simulcast with ESPN station WOBT in Rhinelander.

In January 2009, WLKD dropped ESPN Radio and switched back to the Music of Your Life format. Its former simulcast partner, WOBT, is now airing Classic Country.

On February 29, 2012, WLKD changed its format to news/talk.

On January 22, 2014, WLKD changed its format to soft oldies, branded as "The Lake".
