= CHST =

CHST may refer to:

- CHST-FM, a radio station (102.3 FM) licensed to London, Ontario, Canada
- Canada Health and Social Transfer
- Chamorro Time Zone (ChST), UTC+10
