= WWRF =

Radio station in Lake Worth, Florida

- Lake Worth, Florida; United States
- Broadcast area: West Palm Beach, Florida
- Frequency: 1380 kHz
- Branding: 94.7 & 96.9 The Surf

Programming
- Language: English
- Format: Mainstream rock

Ownership
- Owner: Glades Media Group; (Glades Media Company LLP)
- Sister stations: WLLY-FM

History
- First air date: March 1, 1987 (39 years ago)
- Former call signs: WLVS (1987–2000)
- Call sign meaning: "Radio Fiesta" (former branding)

Technical information
- Licensing authority: FCC
- Facility ID: 24461
- Class: D
- Power: 90 Watts
- Transmitter coordinates: 26°48′00″N 80°4′32″W
- Translators: 94.7 W234DA (West Palm Beach); 96.9 W245AY (Lake Worth)
- Repeater: 99.5 WLLY-HD4 (Palm Beach Gardens)

Links
- Public license information: Public file; LMS
- Webcast: Listen live
- Website: thesurfrocks.com

WWRF (1380 AM) is a radio station licensed to Lake Worth, Florida broadcasting in the West Palm Beach radio market. It airs a mainstream rock radio format, and is owned by Glades Media Group. The studios and offices are on South Congress Avenue in Palm Springs, Since the transmitter site on 7th Avenue North in Lake Worth was demolished the station now broadcasts under an STA registered with the FCC. It is broadcasting from a large water tower which dominates the skyline based along Old Dixie Highway. It addition to its main signal it is also simulcast on the HD4 subchannel of WLLY-FM.

== History ==
The station went on the air as WLVS on March 1, 1987. On March 15, 2000, the station changed its call sign to the current WWRF.

Former logo

On December 8, 2024, WWRF dropped its Spanish contemporary format and began stunting with Christmas music.

On December 25, 2024, at 1 p.m., on Christmas day, WWRF flipped to variety hits as "94.7 & 96.9 Jack FM".

On August 12, 2026, WWRF changed their format from variety hits to mainstream rock, branded as "94.7/96.9 The Surf". Jack FM has been moved to WJBW

== Previous logos ==
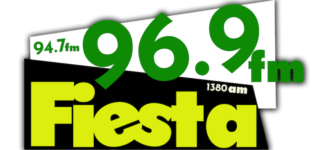
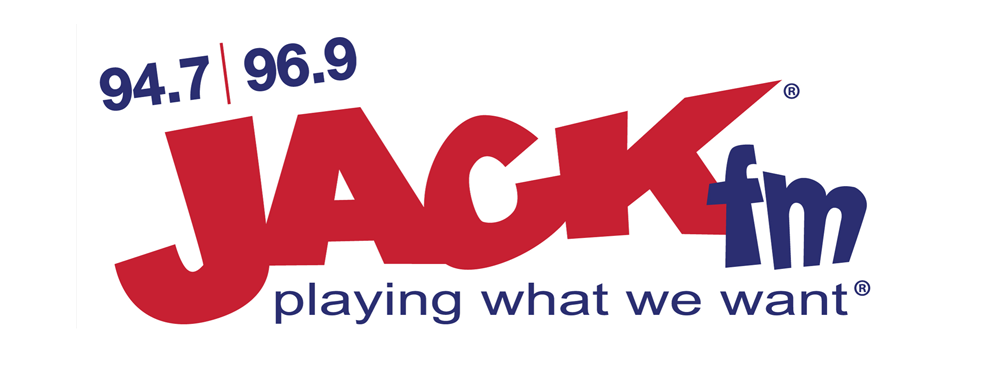
