= Maeser =

Maeser may refer to:

- Karl G. Maeser, prominent member of the Church of Jesus Christ of Latter-day Saints
- Maeser, Utah
