= KCUA =

KCUA may refer to:

- KCUA (FM)
- Kyoto City University of Arts
