= WOBT =

Radio station in Rhinelander, Wisconsin

Coordinates: 45°37′42″N 89°23′38″W

- Rhinelander, Wisconsin; United States
- Frequency: 1240 kHz
- Branding: 101.3 FM 1240 AM The Game

Programming
- Format: Sports
- Affiliations: Fox Sports Radio (selected programs)

Ownership
- Owner: NRG Media (sale to Midwest Communications pending); (NRG License Sub, LLC)
- Sister stations: WHDG; WLKD; WMQA-FM; WRHN; WRLO-FM

History
- First air date: May 19, 1947

Technical information
- Licensing authority: FCC
- Facility ID: 49801
- Class: C
- Power: 950 watts day; 1,000 watts night
- Translator: 101.3 W267AF (Rhinelander)

Links
- Public license information: Public file; LMS
- Webcast: Listen live
- Website: wrhn.com/the-game-northwoods/

WOBT (1240 AM) is a radio station in Rhinelander, Wisconsin, United States. Owned by NRG Media, the station airs a sports format.

== History ==
On February 13, 2012, WOBT changed their format from sports to classic country.

On March 21, 2012, WOBT began rebroadcasting on FM translator W267AF 101.3 FM.

On January 5, 2021, WOBT changed their format from classic country to sports, branded as "101.3 & 1240 The Game".

== Previous logo ==
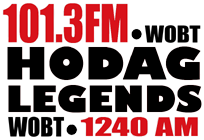
