= WCMY =

Coordinates: 41°20′53″N 88°48′15″W

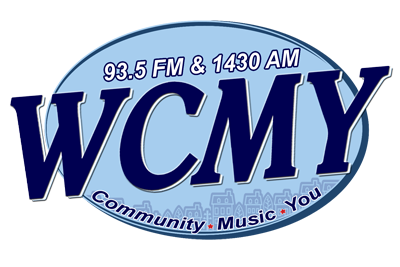
- Ottawa, Illinois; United States
- Broadcast area: LaSalle/Ottawa
- Frequency: 1430 kHz

Programming
- Format: Adult Standards
- Affiliations: NBC News Radio; Westwood One; Chicago White Sox Radio Network

Ownership
- Owner: NRG Media; (NRG License Sub, LLC)
- Sister stations: WRKX

History
- First air date: March 5, 1952

Technical information
- Licensing authority: FCC
- Facility ID: 70305
- Class: D
- Power: 500 watts day 38 watts night
- Translator: 93.5 W228DZ (Ottawa)

Links
- Public license information: Public file; LMS
- Webcast: Listen Live
- Website: 1430wcmy.com

WCMY (1430 AM) is a radio station licensed to Ottawa, Illinois, covering Northern Illinois, including LaSalle, Ottawa, and Streator. WCMY formerly had a News Talk/Full Service format and is owned by NRG Media. WCMY primarily featured local programming; however, it does carry nationally syndicated shows as well, such as Lou Dobbs, Laura Ingraham, Jim Bohannon, and Coast to Coast AM. The station began broadcasting on March 5, 1952, and was originally owned by Carl H. Meyer. The station now airs Adult Standards as 93.5/1430 WCMY.
