= WRLO-FM =

Radio station in Antigo, Wisconsin

- Antigo, Wisconsin; United States
- Broadcast area: Rhinelander
- Frequency: 105.3 MHz
- Branding: Rock 105.3

Programming
- Format: Classic rock
- Affiliations: United Stations Radio Networks; Westwood One; Packers Radio Network

Ownership
- Owner: NRG Media (sale to Midwest Communications pending); (NRG License Sub, LLC)
- Sister stations: WHDG; WLKD; WMQA-FM; WOBT; WRHN

History
- First air date: November 11, 1973
- Former call signs: WATK-FM (1973–1978)
- Former frequencies: 104.9 MHz (1973–1980)
- Call sign meaning: "Rhinelander, Wisconsin"

Technical information
- Licensing authority: FCC
- Facility ID: 432
- Class: C1
- ERP: 100,000 watts
- HAAT: 165 meters (541 ft)
- Transmitter coordinates: 45°22′4.00″N 89°8′20.00″W

Links
- Public license information: Public file; LMS
- Webcast: Listen live
- Website: wrlo.com

WRLO-FM (105.3 MHz) is a commercial radio station in Antigo, Wisconsin, United States, that serves the Rhinelander area. The station is owned by NRG Media through licensee NRG License Sub, LLC and features programming from United Stations Radio Networks and Westwood One. It broadcasts a classic rock format.

== History ==
The station's original call letters were WATK-FM. In the late 1970s, the current call letters were adopted, initially broadcasting an easy listening format. The station broadcast on 104.9 until the spring of 1980.

Previous logo
