= KIDN-FM =

- Hayden, Colorado; United States
- Broadcast area: Steamboat Springs, Colorado
- Frequency: 95.9 MHz
- Branding: The Lift FM

Programming
- Format: Hot AC

Ownership
- Owner: Patricia MacDonald Garber and Peter Benedetti; (AlwaysMountainTime, LLC)
- Sister stations: KFMU-FM, KQZR

History
- First air date: 1990 (as KKMX-FM)
- Former call signs: KKMX-FM (1985–1992)

Technical information
- Licensing authority: FCC
- Facility ID: 57339
- Class: C3
- ERP: 6,000 watts
- HAAT: 198 meters (650 ft)
- Transmitter coordinates: 40°31′16″N 107°17′46″W
- Translators: 95.5 K238AB (Steamboat Springs); 97.3 K247AP (Steamboat Springs)

Links
- Public license information: Public file; LMS
- Webcast: Listen Live
- Website: KIDN Online

KIDN-FM (95.9 FM) is a radio station licensed to serve Hayden, Colorado, United States. The station is owned by Patricia MacDonald Garber and Peter Benedetti and the broadcast license is held by AlwaysMountainTime, LLC.

It broadcasts a hot adult contemporary format branded as "The Lift FM" to the Steamboat Springs, Colorado, area.

The station was assigned the KIDN call sign by the U.S. Federal Communications Commission (FCC) on April 10, 1992.

The station's original format is unknown. Until 2010, the station was known as "Jack FM" then adopted its "KIDN The Mountain" branding. However, the website redirects to http://alwaysmountaintime.com/kidn/ which shows "The Lift FM" as its current branding.

== Translator ==
KIDN-FM programming is also carried on broadcast translator stations to extend or improve the coverage area of the station.

Broadcast translators for KIDN-FM
Call sign	Frequency	City of license	FID	ERP (W)	Class	FCC info
K238AB	95.5 FM	Steamboat Springs, Colorado	57334	13	D	LMS
K247AP	97.3 FM	Steamboat Springs, Colorado	151696	13	D	LMS

== Construction permit ==
On December 2, 2010, KIDN was granted an FCC construction permit to change the city of license to Burns, Colorado, move to a new transmitter site, decrease ERP to 72 watts and increase HAAT to 850 meters.
