= WMQA-FM =

Radio station in Minocqua, Wisconsin

- Minocqua, Wisconsin; United States
- Frequency: 95.9 MHz
- Branding: 95.9 The Island

Programming
- Format: Adult contemporary
- Affiliations: Compass Media Networks; Premiere Networks; Westwood One

Ownership
- Owner: NRG Media (sale to Midwest Communications pending); (Raven License Sub, LLC)
- Sister stations: WHDG; WLKD; WOBT; WRHN; WRLO-FM

History
- First air date: April 3, 1975
- Former call signs: WWMH (1975–1992)
- Call sign meaning: W MinocQuA

Technical information
- Licensing authority: FCC
- Facility ID: 190631
- Class: C3
- ERP: 22,000 watts
- HAAT: 107 meters (351 ft)
- Transmitter coordinates: 45°49′19″N 89°43′16″W

Links
- Public license information: Public file; LMS
- Webcast: Listen live
- Website: wrhn.com/wmqa-home-page/

WMQA-FM (95.9 MHz, "95.9 The Island") is a commercial radio station broadcasting an adult contemporary format. Licensed to Minocqua, Wisconsin, the station began broadcasting in 1975.

The station features programming from Compass Media Networks, Premiere Networks, and Westwood One. WMQA-FM uses Westwood One's Adult Contemporary format outside of the live and local morning show.

With a 22,000-watt signal, the station covers a portion of northwestern Wisconsin and some of the western Upper Peninsula of Michigan, including the Wisconsin cities of Minocqua, Rhinelander, Lac du Flambeau, Tomahawk, and Eagle River.

== History ==
From its sign-on on April 3, 1975 until 1992, the station operated under the calls WWMH (We're Woodruff, Minocqua [and] Hazelhurst).

During its early days in the mid-1970s, the station ran a mixture of MOR and country music formats. The country format was dropped in the late-1970s and retained its MOR format. An AM sister station, 1570 WFBZ (later WMYM and WMQA-AM, now WLKD) was added in August 1978. In 1982, WWMH dropped MOR and flipped to Top 40. During its days as a Top 40 station, the station was an affiliate of Casey Kasem's American Top 40 in the mid-1980s.

In 1985, the station dropped Top 40 for its current adult contemporary format. The station changed its call letters to the current WMQA-FM in 1992, and the station had a power increase from 5,000 to 25,000 watts, with the station under the moniker "FM 96". As an AC station, the station went by the names Soft Rock 96 and Northern Lites 96 WMQA.

On August 29, 2008, at 10 a.m., the station dropped the AC format and "Northern Lites" name to become "Oldies 95.9." The station's competition in the oldies format is WRJO in Eagle River. WRJO (when local and not airing a different Classic Hits/Pop satellite feed from Westwood One) is more 1950s and 1960s oriented and WMQA's Westwood One programming leans more toward 1960s and 1970s (and some early 1980s) with a more upbeat, as well as a personality presentation.

On June 14, 2021, WMQA-FM dropped its classic hits format and returned back to its previous adult contemporary format, branded as "95.9 The Island".
