= Chicago White Sox Radio Network =

Official radio network of MLB's Chicago White Sox

The Chicago White Sox Radio Network is an American radio network airing baseball games from the Chicago White Sox. The English-language flagship is WMVP in Chicago, with Spanish language coverage airing on WLEY-FM HD3 (107.9 HD3). The English language network consists of 19 stations For the 2019 season, the play-by-play announcers were Ed Farmer and Jason Benetti (who joins the broadcast team for national broadcasts and for White Sox's games where Ken Harrelson and Chuck Swirsky fill in for him); the color commentator was Darrin Jackson. Farmer died on April 1, 2020, of polycystic kidney disease. Pre-game host Andy Masur substituted for Farmer during 2020's truncated spring training, and was named as Farmer's successor on June 30, 2020, a role that would be temporary due to the team's radio rights expiring at the end of the season.

WSCR's contract with the White Sox expired after the 2015 season. WLS (890) was to be the new White Sox flagship station from the 2016 through the 2021 seasons; however, WLS owner Cumulus Media filed for Chapter 11 bankruptcy protection in November 2017 and entered into a restructuring agreement with certain of its lenders to reduce more than $1 billion in debt. The Bankruptcy Court allowed Cumulus and WLS to end its contract with the White Sox. WGN became the new flagship station of the Chicago White Sox on February 14, 2018. WGN's contract expired after the 2020 season, with WMVP, an ESPN Radio-owned station operated by Good Karma Brands (now Good Karma Sports as of August 2026), taking over beginning with the 2021 season, WMVP had previously carried the White Sox for 11 seasons between 1995 and 2005. Shortly thereafter, Len Kasper, formerly the television voice for the Chicago Cubs, was hired as the radio play-by-play announcer for the White Sox. Connor McKnight succeeded Masur as pre-game host and fill-in play-by-play announcer.

== Affiliates ==
Chicago White Sox radio network affiliates
City/market	State	Station	Frequency	Network status
Chicago	Illinois	WMVP	1000 AM	Flagship
Chicago	Illinois	WLEY-HD3	107.9-3 FM	Flagship (Spanish)
Clinton	Illinois	WHOW	1520 AM	Affiliate
Clinton	Illinois	W222BG	92.3 FM	WHOW relay
Champaign	Illinois	WDWS	1400 AM	Affiliate
Champaign	Illinois	W230CW	93.9 FM	WDWS relay
Decatur	Illinois	WDZ	1050 AM	Affiliate
Elgin	Illinois	WRMN	1410 AM	Affiliate
Kankakee	Illinois	WYKT	105.5 FM	Affiliate
Lincoln	Illinois	W293DJ	106.5 FM	WHOW relay
Marion	Illinois	WGGH	1150 AM	Affiliate
Marion	Illinois	W251DC	98.1 FM	WGGH relay
Ottawa	Illinois	WCMY	1430 AM	Affiliate
Ottawa	Illinois	W228DZ	93.5 FM	WCMY relay
Rockford	Illinois	WROK	1440 AM	Affiliate
Rockford	Illinois	W241DF	96.1 FM	WROK relay
Springfield	Illinois	WFMB	1450 AM	Affiliate
Springfield	Illinois	W222CG	92.3 FM	WFMB relay
Lafayette	Indiana	WIBN	98.1 FM	Affiliate
Michigan City	Indiana	WEFM	95.9 FM	Affiliate
