= CIOC-FM =

Radio station in Victoria, British Columbia

Coordinates: 48°25′17″N 123°30′40″W

- Victoria, British Columbia; Canada
- Broadcast area: Greater Victoria
- Frequency: 98.5 MHz
- Branding: Ocean 98.5

Programming
- Format: Adult contemporary

Ownership
- Owner: Rogers Radio; (Rogers Media, Inc.)
- Sister stations: CHTT-FM

History
- First air date: 1955
- Former call signs: CKDA-FM (1955–1965); CFMS-FM (1965–1995)
- Call sign meaning: "Ocean"

Technical information
- Licensing authority: CRTC
- Class: C
- ERP: 47,000 watts; 100,000 watts (peak)
- Repeater: 98.5 CIOC-FM-1 (Saltspring Island)

Links
- Website: ocean985.com

CIOC-FM (98.5 MHz) is a commercial radio station in Victoria, British Columbia, Canada, branded as "Ocean 98.5". It is owned by Rogers Radio, a division of Rogers Sports & Media. It broadcasts an adult contemporary format, switching to Christmas music for much of November and December. Its radio studios are located at 817 Fort Street in Downtown Victoria.

CIOC-FM has an effective radiated power (ERP) of 47,000 watts (100,000 watts peak). The transmitter is off Fulton Road in Victoria. The signal covers much of the southern part of Vancouver Island, along with some sections of Puget Sound and the Olympic Peninsula in Washington.

== History ==
=== CKDA-FM ===
The station signed on the air in 1955. Its original call sign was CKDA-FM. It simulcast the signal of then-AM sister station CKDA 1220. It was the first commercial FM station in British Columbia. (The CBC's FM station in Vancouver, today CBU-FM, went on the air in 1947 but is non-commercial.)

CKDA-FM was powered at 370 watts, a fraction of its current output. CKDA-AM-FM were owned by Capital Broadcasting System Ltd. The original FM equipment was located in the "rack room" of CKDA's studios. The FM transmitter served as the studio link to the AM transmitter site on Chatham Island. In effect, the AM transmitter received the FM signal and retransmitted it.

=== CFMS-FM ===
By the mid-1960s, the Canadian government was discouraging AM and FM stations in large cities from simulcasting. CKDA-FM became CFMS-FM at 6:00 PM on March 21, 1965. It began broadcasting separate programming, an easy listening format airing between noon and midnight seven days a week. It went to an 18-hour-a-day schedule (7:00 a.m. to 1:00 a.m.) in May 1966. It later switched to a 24-hour-a-day broadcasting schedule. It aired quarter hour sweeps of mostly soft instrumental cover versions of popular songs.

In later years, CFMS switched to a mixed format of adult contemporary music (from 6:00 AM–7:00 PM weekdays and 6:00 AM–6:00 PM weekends) and easy listening instrumentals (in the evenings and overnight).

=== CIOC-FM ===
On September 1, 1995, Capital Broadcasting sold CKDA and CFMS, with CKDA going to OK Radio Group, the owners of CKKQ-FM, and CFMS picked up by CJVI (owned by Rogers Communications). On December 11, CFMS changed to its current full-time adult contemporary format and switched its call sign to the current CIOC-FM.

On March 25, 2010, CIOC was denied by the Canadian Radio-television and Telecommunications Commission (CRTC) to add a new FM transmitter at Saltspring Island. If the application was approved, the new transmitter at Saltspring Island would have broadcast on 98.5 MHz, the same frequency as CIOC's main transmitter in Victoria. On September 13, 2010, the station reapplied to add a repeater at Saltspring Island and received CRTC approval on February 23, 2011.
