= CHTT =

CHTT may refer to:

- CHTT-FM, a radio station (103.1 FM) licensed to Victoria, British Columbia, Canada
- Chattem (NASDAQ symbol CHTT)
- Chicago Heights Terminal Transfer Railroad, one of the many reporting marks owned by Union Pacific Railroad
