= WRHN =

Radio station in Rhinelander, Wisconsin

- Rhinelander, Wisconsin; United States
- Frequency: 100.1 MHz
- Branding: 100.1 Jack FM

Programming
- Format: Adult hits
- Affiliations: Fox News Radio; Jack FM

Ownership
- Owner: NRG Media (sale to Midwest Communications pending); (NRG License Sub, LLC)
- Sister stations: WHDG; WLKD; WMQA-FM; WOBT; WRLO-FM

History
- First air date: 1966
- Call sign meaning: W RHiNelander

Technical information
- Licensing authority: FCC
- Facility ID: 49800
- Class: C1
- ERP: 100,000 watts
- HAAT: 89 meters (292 ft)
- Transmitter coordinates: 45°37′41.8″N 89°23′38.5″W

Links
- Public license information: Public file; LMS
- Webcast: Listen live
- Website: www.wrhn.com

WRHN (100.1 FM) is a commercial radio station broadcasting an adult hits music format in Rhinelander, Wisconsin, United States. The station is currently owned by NRG Media and features programming from Fox News Radio and Jack FM. Formerly, Star 100 and most recently 100.1 Sam FM. The programming is derived from Westwood One's "Jack FM" moniker.
