= KBHO =

KBHO may refer to:

- KBHO-LD, a low-power television station (channel 9, virtual 7) licensed to serve Richmond, Texas, United States
- KWJK, a radio station (93.1 FM) licensed to serve Boonville, Missouri, United States, which held the call sign KBHO from 1998 to 2000
