= WHDG =

Radio station in Rhinelander, Wisconsin

- Rhinelander, Wisconsin; United States
- Frequency: 97.3 MHz
- Branding: Hodag Country 97.3

Programming
- Format: Country
- Affiliations: Westwood One

Ownership
- Owner: NRG Media (sale to Midwest Communications pending); (Raven License Sub, LLC)
- Sister stations: WLKD; WMQA-FM; WOBT; WRHN; WRLO-FM

History
- First air date: April 17, 1984
- Former call signs: WZTT (1984–1994)
- Former frequencies: 97.5 MHz (1994–2009)
- Call sign meaning: Hodag, a mythical creature that supposedly lives in Rhinelander

Technical information
- Licensing authority: FCC
- Facility ID: 55211
- Class: C1
- ERP: 100,000 watts
- HAAT: 168.0 meters (551.2 ft)
- Transmitter coordinates: 45°22′50.00″N 89°11′22.00″W

Links
- Public license information: Public file; LMS
- Webcast: Listen live
- Website: www.whdg.com

WHDG (97.3 FM) is a commercial radio station broadcasting a country music format in Rhinelander, Wisconsin, United States. The station is currently owned by NRG Media through licensee Raven License Sub, LLC and features programming from Westwood One.

== History ==
The station went on the air as WZTT on April 17, 1984. On July 8, 1994, the station changed its call sign to the current WHDG.

On July 19, 2009, the station moved from their longtime frequency of 97.5 to 97.3 to accommodate the frequency of Glenmore-licensed station WTAQ-FM on 97.5, which serves the Green Bay market and signed on in February 2010.
