= WGYL =

Radio station in Vero Beach, Florida

- Vero Beach, Florida; United States
- Broadcast area: Melbourne–Cocoa–Fort Pierce–Stuart, Florida
- Frequency: 93.7 MHz
- RDS: 937GYL
- Branding: 93.7 GYL

Programming
- Format: Hot adult contemporary

Ownership
- Owner: Treasure & Space Coast Radio; (Vero Beach Broadcasters, LLC)
- Sister stations: WJKD; WOSN; WTTB

History
- First air date: November 1970; 55 years ago
- Call sign meaning: "We're Glad You're Listening"

Technical information
- Licensing authority: FCC
- Facility ID: 58946
- Class: C2
- ERP: 50,000 watts
- HAAT: 146 meters (479 ft)
- Transmitter coordinates: 27°36′4.00″N 80°23′33.00″W

Links
- Public license information: Public file; LMS
- Webcast: Listen live
- Website: 937wgyl.com

WGYL (93.7 MHz) is a commercial radio station licensed to Vero Beach, Florida, and serving the radio markets of Melbourne-Cocoa-Fort Pierce-Stuart. It airs an hot adult contemporary radio format. The station is owned by Treasure and Space Coast Broadcasters, with the license held by Vero Beach Broadcasters, LLC. The offices and studios are on 16th Street in Vero Beach. The transmitter is off First Place, near Old Dixie Highway, also in Vero Beach.

The station partners with WPTV in West Palm Beach to provide weather information.

== History ==
WGYL signed on the air in November 1970. It originally was a Class A station, broadcasting on 93.5 MHz, a frequency reserved at that time for lower powered FM stations. WGYL's effective radiated power was 3,000 watts, a fraction of the 50,000 watts it runs today. It broadcast a beautiful music format of mostly soft instrumental remakes of popular songs.

In 1987, the station was sold to Treasure Coast Broadcasters, teamed up with AM 1490 WTTB, and the two stations remain co-owned. During the late 1980s, WGYL gradually increased the number of vocal songs and decreased the instrumentals; by the early 1990s, the station had made the transition to a soft adult contemporary format as "The Breeze." In the early 1990s, the station got a big boost in power, increasing to 50,000 watts, coupled with a move one spot up the dial to 93.7 MHz.

Through the early 2000s, the station to a mainstream AC format. On September 15, 2015, WGYL changed its format to hot adult contemporary, branded as "93.7 WGYL." The station's moniker became "Today's Best Music!"
