= WTNV =

- Tiptonville, Tennessee; United States
- Broadcast area: Dyersburg, Tennessee
- Frequency: 97.3 MHz
- Branding: Eagle 97.3

Programming
- Format: Country
- Affiliations: Fox News Radio; Compass Media Networks

Ownership
- Owner: Burks Broadcasting; (Dr. Pepper Pepsi-Cola Bottling Company of Dyersburg, LLC)
- Sister stations: WASL, WTRO

History
- Former call signs: WOGY (2006)

Technical information
- Licensing authority: FCC
- Facility ID: 165320
- Class: A
- ERP: 1,900 watts
- HAAT: 180.0 meters (590.6 ft)
- Transmitter coordinates: 36°16′11.00″N 89°19′25.00″W

Links
- Public license information: Public file; LMS
- Webcast: Listen Live
- Website: eagle973.net

WTNV (97.3 FM, "Eagle 97.3") is a radio station broadcasting a country music format. Licensed to Tiptonville, Tennessee, United States, and based in Dyersburg, Tennessee, the station is currently owned by Burks Broadcasting, through licensee Dr. Pepper Pepsi-Cola Bottling Company of Dyersburg, LLC (dba Burks Beverage).
