= WOSN =

Radio station in Indian River Shores, Florida

- Indian River Shores, Florida; United States
- Broadcast area: Treasure Coast
- Frequency: 97.1 MHz
- Branding: 97.1 Ocean FM

Programming
- Format: Soft adult contemporary

Ownership
- Owner: Treasure & Space Coast Radio; (Vero Beach Broadcasters, LLC)
- Sister stations: WGYL; WJKD; WTTB

History
- First air date: 1996; 30 years ago
- Former call signs: WAAE (1996–1996)
- Call sign meaning: Ocean

Technical information
- Licensing authority: FCC
- Facility ID: 63823
- Class: C3
- ERP: 23,000 watts
- HAAT: 106 meters (348 ft)

Links
- Public license information: Public file; LMS
- Website: wosnfm.com

WOSN (97.1 FM) is a commercial radio station owned by Treasure & Space Coast Radio. It broadcasts a soft adult contemporary radio format, switching to Christmas music for part of November and December. Licensed to Indian River Shores, Florida, the station serves the Treasure Coast including Vero Beach and Fort Pierce. The station license is held by Vero Beach Broadcasters.

The studios and offices are on 16th Street in Vero Beach. The transmitter is off 77th Street, also in Vero Beach. It has an effective radiated power (ERP) of 23,000 watts.

== History ==
In 1996, the station signed on the air as WAAE. It was owned by Centennial Broadcasting of Florida with studios on 43rd Street in Vero Beach. Within months, it had switched its call sign to WOSN, representing the word "Ocean." The station originally had an adult standardsformat. WOSN derived some of its programming from Westwood One America's Best Music satellite service.

Jeff Rollins, who had been with America's Best Music, hosted a local morning show from 6 am. to noon. Weekend programming included Herb Oscar Anderson, formerly of WABC in New York City, Saturdays at 7 pm.

In early 2017, WOSN updated its format to soft adult contemporary music. Current on-air personalities include Hamp Elliott, Bob Soos, Jim Davis, Rick Lane, Juan O'Reilly, and Bill Dake (host of the Sunday Smooth Jazz Brunch).
