= WTTB =

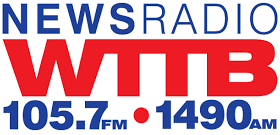
- Vero Beach, Florida; United States
- Broadcast area: Treasure Coast
- Frequency: 1490 kHz
- Branding: Newsradio 1490

Programming
- Format: Talk radio
- Affiliations: Westwood One; Premiere Radio Networks

Ownership
- Owner: Treasure & Space Coast Radio; (Vero Beach Broadcasters, LLC)
- Sister stations: WGYL; WJKD; WOSN

History
- First air date: June 7, 1954
- Call sign meaning: "Where The Tropics Begin"

Technical information
- Licensing authority: FCC
- Facility ID: 58947
- Class: C
- Power: 1,000 watts
- Transmitter coordinates: 27°37′12.00″N 80°25′1.00″W
- Translator: 105.7 W289CF (Vero Beach)

Links
- Public license information: Public file; LMS
- Website: wttbam.com

WTTB (1490 kHz) is a commercial AM radio station licensed to Vero Beach, Florida, and serving the Treasure Coast. It broadcasts a talk radio format, calling itself "Newsradio 105.7 and 1490." The station is owned by Treausure & Space Coast Radio with the license held by Vero Beach Broadcasters, LLC.

WTTB is powered at 1,000 watts, non-directional. It is also heard on 250 watt FM translator W289CF at 105.7 MHz in Vero Beach.

== Programming ==
While most of WTTB's programming is nationally syndicated talk shows, there are two local hours each weekday featuring Treasure Coast news and information, at 8 a.m. and 6 p.m. Hosts heard on WTTB include Sean Hannity, Glenn Beck, Brian Kilmeade, Dan Bongino, Jim Bohannon, Doug Stephan, "America in The Morning" and "Coast to Coast AM with George Noory." Weather is supplied by WPTV Channel 5.

== History ==
WTTB is one of the oldest radio stations along the Treasure Coast. It signed on the air on June 7, 1954. Although it is widely believed the station's slogan, Where the tropics begin, originated with WTTB, Dr. John Leroy Hutchison has been credited for coining the phrase back in the 1920s–nearly three decades before WTTB went on the air. The phrase was used in the 2009 television series pilot for CBS's Harper's Island.

During the 1960s, 70s and 80s, the station featured a full service, middle of the road format of popular music, news and sports. By the 1990s, it had ended its music programs and became all-talk.

== See also ==
- List of radio stations in Florida
- Treasure Coast
- WPTV
