= KWRT =

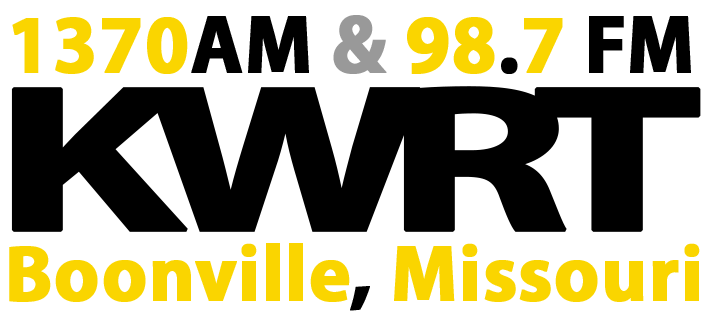
- Boonville, Missouri; United States
- Broadcast area: Columbia, Missouri
- Frequency: 1370 kHz
- Branding: KWRT 1370 AM and 98.7 FM

Programming
- Format: True Country
- Affiliations: Dial Global Networks, AP Radio

Ownership
- Owner: Billings Broadcasting LLC.
- Sister stations: KWJK

Technical information
- Licensing authority: FCC
- Facility ID: 5225
- Class: D
- Power: 1,000 watts day 84 watts night
- Transmitter coordinates: 38°56′44.00″N 92°46′14.00″W
- Translator: 98.7 K254DE (Boonville)

Links
- Public license information: Public file; LMS
- Webcast: Listen Live
- Website: 1370kwrt.com

KWRT (1370 AM) is an American radio station broadcasting a True Country format. Licensed to Boonville, Missouri, United States, the station serves the Columbia, Missouri, area. The station is currently owned by Billings Broadcasting LLC and features programming from Dial Global Networks and AP Radio.

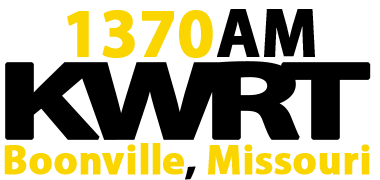
Logo before translator sign on
