= WJBW =

Radio station in Florida, United States

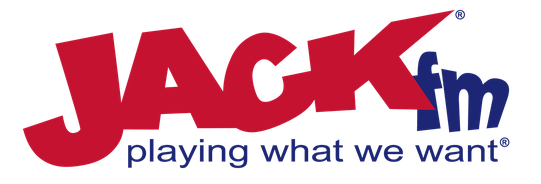
- Jupiter, Florida; United States
- Frequency: 1000 kHz
- Branding: 93.7 Jack FM

Programming
- Format: Adult hits

Ownership
- Owner: Little Dog Media Group

History
- First air date: September 23, 1992
- Former call signs: WMLZ (1992–1997); WJBW (1997–1999); WDBE (1999–2001); WDBF (2001)

Technical information
- Licensing authority: FCC
- Facility ID: 32963
- Class: D
- Power: 650 watts (day}; 17 watts (night)
- Transmitter coordinates: 26°56′20.00″N 80°7′0.00″W
- Translator: 93.7 W229DG (West Palm Beach)

Links
- Public license information: Public file; LMS

WJBW (1000 AM, 93.7 Jack FM) is a radio station airing an Adult hits format licensed to serve Jupiter, Florida. The station is owned by Little Dog Media Group .

== History ==
The station went on the air as WMLZ on September 23, 1992. On August 14, 1997, the station changed its call sign to WJBW. On April 13, 1999, it changed to WDBE. On April 14, 2001, it changed yet again to WDBF. On November 6, 2001, it reverted WJBW.

As of August 12, 2026, Little Dog Media Group acquired WJBW, and flipped to Adult Hits as 93.7 Jack FM.
