= BOB fm (Hertfordshire) =

Coordinates: 51.8722°N 0.2113°W

- England
- Broadcast area: Knebworth, Hertford, Ware, Hatfield, Hitchin, Letchworth Garden City, Stevenage, Welwyn Garden City & Watton-at-Stone

Programming
- Format: Adult Hits, Top 40, Pop Music

Ownership
- Owner: Communicorp; (Shadow Radio Holdings)

History
- First air date: 3 March 2001 (as HertBeat FM)
- Last air date: 31 May 2019 (as BOB fm)
- Former frequencies: 106.7 MHz, 106.9 MHz; RDS: BOB_fm

BOB fm was an Independent Local Radio station broadcasting to north Hertfordshire in the United Kingdom. Programming originated from studios at the Old Pump House in Knebworth Park. Launched as Hertbeat FM in 2001, it was subsumed into Heart Hertfordshire on 31 May 2019 shortly after acquisition by media group Communicorp.

== History ==
=== Early Years: Radio Hertford and Hertbeat FM ===
In October 1998, following seven years of lobbying of the Radio Authority Radio Hertford was granted a restricted service licence to broadcast for a two-week period to Hertford and surrounding areas.

The Radio Authority then invited applications to apply for a long-term Hertford licence. The Radio Hertford consortium submitted a bid to broadcast as Hertbeat FM competing with a rival entrant, Stag FM, backed by The Daily Mail Radio Group. Citing Radio Hertford's lobbying of the Radio Authority, trial broadcast and emphasis on local content, the HertBeat FM bid was awarded a licence in February 2000. The station proposed "an imaginative, music-led service, targeted at discerning 25 to 54-year olds, with intelligent speech that emphasises local news and information."

The Old Pump House at Knebworth Park was converted into radio studios and production offices. Broadcasting commenced on 3 March 2001 with the inaugural show presented by Robbie Owen, founder and a director of the company, his shows continued throughout the life of the station and on for a period under the new management along with Steve Folland, also amongst the original lineup who continued presenting at the station until November 2013. Other programmes included The Ultimate 80's which was presented by Nigel Cayne. The Hertbeat FM slogan was "Broadcasting to Hatfield, Hertford, Stevenage, Ware and Welwyn Garden City this is 1067 &9 Hertbeat FM".

July 2005 saw Hertbeat FM owner Radio Hertford (Commercial) acquired by Shadow Radio Holdings, led by Brett Harley, resulting in a change of directors.

The station continued offering locally oriented content, music and request shows using a roster of presenters through the day and night.

=== Jack FM ===
On 10 May 2010 HertBeat abruptly rebranded as Jack FM – at that time the third Jack FM licensee operating in the UK. Amongst the reasons for terminating HertBeat was confusion with encroaching rival network Heart.

The Jack format was mostly automated, initially only "Jack's Breakfast" with Steve Folland surviving as a presenter-led show but later complemented with a Saturday "Interactive Brunch" topical news show presented by newsreader Chris Hubbard and a Sunday "All Eighties" music show with Brett Harley. The rest of the schedule included music, snippets from "Jack's Breakfast", news and other local content.

In common with the other UK Jack stations many links between segments were provided by the acerbic Voice of Jack, Paul Darrow, recorded at Jack FM Oxfordshire, often tailored for the local audience. Unlike HertBeat, Jack FM rejected listener's requests, a stance reinforced by the brand slogan, "Playing what we want".

In November 2013, as the Jack FM period drew to a close Steve Folland departed the station, replaced by industry veteran Graham Mack.

=== BOB fm ===
The station's preparations to broadcast using DAB in addition to FM, triggered another rebranding due to lack of exclusivity of the Jack FM moniker on the DAB multiplex and potential clashes with the growing number of stations then operating as Jack FM franchises.

From January to March 2014 listeners were encouraged to suggest new names for the station. Unlike the sudden transformation to Jack FM, the plan to rename the station was trailed extensively.

The rebranding was announced on 10 March 2014. The final song played by the station as Jack FM Hertfordshire was "Things Can Only Get Better" by D:Ream, airing shortly before 0800.

At 0808 the station was transformed into BOB fm. The inaugural song was "Hit the Road Jack" by Ray Charles.

The station emulated Jack FM's automated format, with links and catchphrase "Turn your knob to BOB", provided by Voice of BOB, Jim McCabe.

There was no connection to other broadcasters operating as Bob FM outside the United Kingdom.

BOB fm's DAB service ceased in August 2018.

=== Incorporation into Heart Hertfordshire ===
In April 2019, Shadow Radio Holdings was purchased by Communicorp.

Earlier in the year Communicorp had acquired Watford-based Heart Hertfordshire, which broadcasts in south Hertfordshire, from Adventure Radio. The takeover of BOB fm allowed Heart Hertfordshire to extend its reach throughout the county. A transition began in May with Heart-style jingles, slogans and music interspersed amongst its output. Frequent trailers proclaimed "Heart is coming."

On 31 May 2019, the final live presented show, "BOB's Breakfast" with Brett Harley and Chris Hubbard ended with "Are You with Me" by Lost Frequencies. BOB fm ceased broadcasting at 4pm, handing over to Heart Hertfordshire for the station's drivetime show from Watford. The closure of BOB fm coincided with programming changes across the wider Heart radio network. The station still retains local news, traffic updates and advertising - with Chris Hubbard continuing to head up the station's Breakfast News.

== Ofcom complaints ==
- In 2006 Hertbeat ran advertisements for Stevenage Borough Council during an election period that media regulator Ofcom determined breached rules regarding political content.
- During the 2014 Scottish independence referendum a publicity stunt, involving an on-air rant against Scots and a ban on Scottish music by presenter Graham Mack prompted almost 50 complaints to Ofcom. Ofcom determined the complaints did not warrant investigation.
- A lively conversation in May 2018 between a caller and Graham Mack regarding a local speed camera patrol was reported to Ofcom. The investigation deemed the broadcast to be in breach of rules regarding potential to cause offence. Graham Mack departed the station during July 2018 shortly before the Ofcom adjudication in August to become Programme Director at London-based Fix Radio. Brett Harley replaced Graham Mack as host of BOB's Breakfast.

== Awards ==
Graham Mack won "Best Radio Personality" Finalist at the New York Festivals International Radio Awards in 2017. BOB fm developed a reputation for the quality of its local news, under the leadership of News Editor Chris Hubbard. Chris Hubbard won "Newsreader of the Year" at the Independent Radio News (IRN) Awards, having previously been twice shortlisted. The IRN also awarded the accolade of "News Team of the Year" to the station in 2013 and 2016. Its journalists and reports have also been shortlisted for or won several honours.
