= CJZN-FM =

Radio station in Victoria, British Columbia

Coordinates: 48°35′40″N 123°32′42″W

- Victoria, British Columbia; Canada
- Broadcast area: Greater Victoria
- Frequency: 91.3 MHz
- Branding: The Zone @ 91-3

Programming
- Format: Modern rock
- Affiliations: Victoria Royals

Ownership
- Owner: Jim Pattison Group
- Sister stations: CKKQ-FM

History
- First air date: January 18, 1950
- Former call signs: CKDA (1950–1995); CKXM (1995–2000); CKXM-FM (2000–2001)
- Former frequencies: 1340 kHz (1950–1954); 1280 AM (1954–1957); 1220 AM (1957–1986); 1200 AM (1986–2000)
- Call sign meaning: ZN for "Zone"

Technical information
- Class: C
- ERP: 1,766 watts (average); 3,500 watts (peak) horizontal polarization only
- HAAT: 494 metres (1,621 ft)

Links
- Website: thezone.fm

CJZN-FM (The Zone @ 91-3) is a Canadian broadcast radio station in Victoria, British Columbia, Canada. CJZN broadcasts a modern rock format at 91.3 on the FM band. The station can also be heard in the interior Northwest of Washington. The signal overpowers KBCS from Bellevue Community College, which is a public radio station.

== History ==
CJZN signed on for the first time on January 18, 1950, as CKDA, initially broadcasting on 1340 AM at 250 watts under the ownership of Capital Broadcasting System Ltd. (headed by founder David Armstrong). On August 1, 1954, CKDA moved to 1280 AM and increased its power to 5,000 watts; in 1955, CKDA-FM was signed on as a simulcast of CKDA, and was the studio transmitter link to the off-shore transmitter site. On September 18, 1957, the AM station moved to 1220 kHz and doubled its power to 10,000 watts.

In compliance with new broadcaster regulations regarding simulcasting, on March 21, 1965, CKDA-FM ended its simulcast of its AM sister and became CFMS-FM, airing an easy listening format from noon to midnight seven days a week. In 1966, CKDA increased its power to 25,000 watts and in 1971 to 50,000 watts, and moved to 1200 AM on July 1, 1986. The station dropped its oldies format for an all-'70s music format in 1994. CKDA and CFMS founder David Armstrong died on April 22, 1985, after which point his widow, Sheridan Armstrong, took over running the stations.

In August 1995, the OK Radio Group Ltd. purchased CKDA from Capital Broadcasting and relaunched it as CKXM in October 1995, broadcasting a country music format as 1200 CKXM Country. At that time, CKXM and its sister station CKKQ-FM were located at 3795 Carey Road in Victoria. CKKQ was on the second floor while CKXM was on the first floor.

In May 1999, both CKXM and CKKQ moved to the top floor of 2750 Quadra Street, a three-storey Victoria office building purchased by the OK Radio Group Ltd. in the fall of 1998.

In March 2000, CKXM moved from the AM band to the FM band at a frequency of 91.3, maintaining its country music format and rebranded as The New X 91 Three. The AM signal continued until May 2000.

On June 21, 2001, CKXM changed its call sign to the current CJZN and relaunched as The Zone @ 91-3 with a modern rock format. The first song played was Blink 182's Rock Show.

With the shift in format, the station introduced a Band Of The Month promotion supporting local Victoria artists. Some of those artists include: Jets Overhead, Armchair Cynics, Moneyshot, Acres of Lions, Leeroy Stagger, Kincaide, Theset, and Vince Vaccaro.

On December 1, 2006, CJZN and CKKQ came under the ownership of the Jim Pattison Group.

== Rebroadcasters ==
Rebroadcasters of CJZN-FM
City of licence	Identifier	Frequency	Power	Class	RECNet	CRTC Decision
Sooke	CJZN-FM-1	97.1 FM	64 watts	A	Query	2000-79
