= WRKX =

Coordinates: 41.383°N 88.855°W

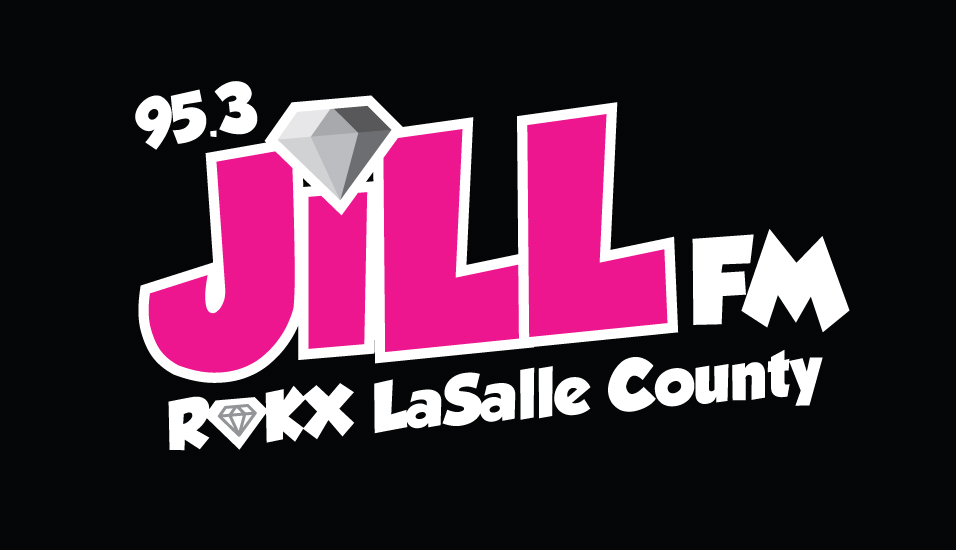
- Ottawa, Illinois; United States
- Broadcast area: LaSalle / Ottawa
- Frequency: 95.3 MHz
- Branding: 95.3 Jill FM

Programming
- Format: Classic rock

Ownership
- Owner: NRG Media; (NRG License Sub, LLC)
- Sister stations: WCMY

History
- First air date: August 15, 1964 (as WOLI at 98.3)
- Former call signs: WOLI (1964–1976)
- Former frequencies: 98.3 MHz (1964–1975)

Technical information
- Licensing authority: FCC
- Facility ID: 70304
- Class: A
- ERP: 4,300 watts
- HAAT: 61 meters (200 ft)

Links
- Public license information: Public file; LMS
- Webcast: Listen live
- Website: 1430wcmy.com/jillfm/

WRKX (95.3 FM, "Jill FM") is a radio station broadcasting a classic rock format. Licensed to Ottawa, Illinois, the station covers Northern Illinois, including LaSalle, and Ottawa. It is owned by NRG Media.

== History ==
The station began broadcasting on August 15, 1964, as WOLI, and broadcast at 98.3 MHz. WOLI aired a MOR format. By 1975, the station had begun airing a rock/top 40 format. In 1975, the station's frequency was changed to 95.3 MHz, and in September 1976, its call sign was changed to WRKX.

By 1977, the station had begun airing a country music format. The station continued airing a country music format into the 1980s. By 1985, the station had begun airing an adult contemporary format. In August 1991, the station's format was changed to classic rock. In early 1993, the station's format was changed to hot AC. The station was branded "K95.3", "The River". By 2010, the station's format had changed to adult hits, as "95.3 SAM FM", carrying Westwood One's S.A.M.: Simply About Music programming until the discontinuation of the network in August 2015, at which point the station became "95.3 Jack FM". On September 1, 2025, the station changed its format to classic rock, branded as "95.3 Jill FM".
