= KVLX =

- Franklin, Texas; United States
- Broadcast area: College Station area
- Frequency: 103.9 MHz

Programming
- Format: Contemporary Christian
- Network: K-Love

Ownership
- Owner: Educational Media Foundation

History
- First air date: June 26, 1986
- Former call signs: KCRM (1982–1993); KHLR (1993–2001); KXCS (2001–2007); KJXJ (2007–2018)

Technical information
- Licensing authority: FCC
- Facility ID: 72718
- Class: C3
- ERP: 8,700 watts
- HAAT: 167.5 m (550 ft)
- Transmitter coordinates: 30°53′5″N 96°32′29″W

Links
- Public license information: Public file; LMS
- Website: www.klove.com

KVLX (103.9 FM, "K-LOVE") is a radio station owned by Educational Media Foundation (EMF) licensed to Franklin, Texas with studios in Bryan, Texas. The station carries EMF's K-LOVE contemporary Christian music format. The transmitter is located in Hearne, Texas.

== History ==
The station first existed as KCRM from June 1, 1982 to December 27, 1993, before changing its call sign to KHLR. On April 9, 2001, the station's call sign became KXCS, which it kept until receiving the call sign of KJXJ on March 29, 2007.

=== KXCS ===
KXCS used the slogans "103.9 XCS, Everything That Rocks" and "Aggieland's New Rock Alternative, 103.9 The X", and once carried the Lex and Terry and Loveline programs.

=== Transition to KJXJ ===
On the evening of March 19, 2007, DJs announced that the station was changing from the Rock/Alternative Rock format. The last DJs that night were Kira McKinney (on-air moniker: "The Queen of Rock") to 10 PM, and Dex Peck from 10 PM-midnight. The last songs under the old format: "I Ran (So Far Away)" by A Flock of Seagulls; "Snakes on a Plane (Bring It)" by Cobra Starship; "Joker and the Thief" by Wolfmother; "Teenage Dirtbag" by Wheatus; and "Another One Bites the Dust" by Queen, dedicated by Dex to a list of staffers.

The transition day of March 20 was a confusing and motley collection of music not conforming to a single genre. Across the course of the day, listeners heard a bizarre mixture of rap, classic rock, show tunes, TV theme songs, reggae, easy listening, and others. Shortly after midnight, the audio feed abruptly cut off in the middle of a long string of Irish Drinking Songs, and suddenly new programming came over the air, identifying the broadcast as a Jack FM station. On April 3, 2007, this station began identifying itself as KJXJ.

=== Return to rock ===
logo used under previous format

On September 20, 2010, KJXJ abandoned the Jack format and became "Rock 103.9."

=== ESPN Aggieland ===
On March 2, 2015, KJXJ changed their format from rock to sports, branded as "ESPN Aggieland".

=== 103.9 The Wolf ===
On October 17, 2016, KJXJ changed their format from sports to classic rock, branded as "103.9 The Wolf".

=== Sale to Educational Media Foundation ===
On March 29, 2018, it was announced that Educational Media Foundation would purchase KJXJ from Brazos Valley Communications for $325,000. On April 6, a modification was filed with the FCC which changed the facility from commercial to non-commercial status, as required by law, given EMF's status as a non-commercial operator. The purchase closed on June 26, 2018, at which point EMF changed the station's call sign to KVLX, as "103-9 The Wolf" transitioned to Bryan-College Station's full powered "K-Love" affiliate.
