= WLLY-FM =

Radio station in Palm Beach Gardens, Florida

- Palm Beach Gardens, Florida; United States
- Broadcast area: West Palm Beach metropolitan area
- Frequency: 99.5 MHz (HD Radio)
- RDS: LALEY995
- Branding: La Ley 99.5

Programming
- Language: Spanish
- Format: Regional Mexican
- Subchannels: HD2: SupaJamz Radio (Caribbean music); HD3: Mega 107.1 (Bilingual CHR); HD4: Simulcast of WWRF (Mainstream rock)

Ownership
- Owner: Glades Media Group; (Glades Media Company LLP)
- Sister stations: WWRF

History
- First air date: July 2, 1979
- Former call signs: WAFC (1979–1984); WAFC-FM (1984–2010)
- Former frequencies: 106.3 MHz (1979–2001)
- Call sign meaning: "La Ley" (Spanish for "The law")

Technical information
- Licensing authority: FCC
- Facility ID: 24230
- Class: A
- ERP: 6,000 watts
- HAAT: 100 meters (330 ft)
- Transmitter coordinates: 26°45′43″N 80°4′41″W
- Translators: HD2: 103.7 W279DG (West Palm Beach); HD3: 107.1 W296AW (Mangonia Park)

Links
- Public license information: Public file; LMS
- Webcast: Listen live; HD3: Listen live
- Website: www.wllyfm.com; HD2: supajamz.com; HD3: mega1071.com

WLLY-FM (99.5 FM, "La Ley 99.5") is an American commercial radio station licensed to Palm Beach Gardens, Florida. Owned by Glades Media Group, It serves the West Palm Beach market, and airs an regional Mexican radio format.

The station's studios and offices are located on South Congress Avenue in Palm Springs, and the transmitter, a distinctive Landmark tower, is located on Hill Avenue in West Palm Beach.

== History ==
=== WAFC-FM ===
WLLY-FM launched as WAFC-FM 106.3 in Clewiston, Florida, on July 2, 1979. It was owned by Tri-County Stereo and broadcast a modern country format. In 2001, WAFC-FM moved to 99.5 MHz and upgraded to a Class C3 station.

=== WLLY-FM ===
In 2009, WAFC-FM moved to Clewiston to Palm Beach Gardens, Florida and downgraded back to Class A, and The station flipped to a Regional Mexican format branded as "La Ley 99.5". allowing It to enter the West Palm Beach radio market, On May 13, 2010, WAFC-FM changed their call letters to WLLY-FM.

== HD Radio ==
WLLY-FM is licensed to broadcast in the HD Radio format. On September 6, 2018, WLLY-FM launched a classic hip hop format on its HD3 subchannel, branded as "Yo! 107.1" (simulcast on translator W296AW 107.1 FM Mangonia Park). That translator and the format are owned by Black Media Works, which used the translator to rebroadcast WJFP in Fort Pierce, Florida. In June 2025, WLLY-FM added the HD4 subchannel of WWRF simulcast.

On September 21, 2026, WLLY-HD3 changed their format from classic hip hop to EDM-leaning bilingual CHR, branded as "Mega 107.1".
