= KCUA (FM) =

- Maeser, Utah; United States
- Frequency: 92.5 MHz
- Branding: 92.5 Jack FM

Programming
- Format: Adult hits
- Affiliations: Cumulus Media

Ownership
- Owner: David Barton; (Country Gold Broadcasting, Inc.)

History
- First air date: June 26, 1990

Technical information
- Licensing authority: FCC
- Facility ID: 13483
- Class: C3
- ERP: 840 watts
- HAAT: 506 meters
- Transmitter coordinates: 40°32′16″N 109°41′57″W

Links
- Public license information: Public file; LMS
- Webcast: Listen Live
- Website: KCUA Online

KCUA (92.5 FM, "Jack FM") is a radio station broadcasting an adult hits format. Licensed to Maeser, Utah, United States, the station is currently owned by David Barton, through licensee Country Gold Broadcasting, Inc., and features programming from Cumulus Media.

== History ==
The station went on the air as KCUA on June 26, 1990.
