= WTRO (AM) =

- Dyersburg, Tennessee; United States
- Frequency: 1450 kHz
- Branding: WTRO 101.7 & 1450

Programming
- Format: Oldies
- Affiliations: ABC News Radio

Ownership
- Owner: Burks Broadcasting; (Dr Pepper Pepsi-Cola Bottling Company of Dyersburg, LLC)
- Sister stations: WTNV, WASL

History
- First air date: 1957
- Former call signs: WDSG
- Call sign meaning: Former call letters of Defunct station in same city on 1330 AM

Technical information
- Licensing authority: FCC
- Facility ID: 57203
- Class: C
- Power: 1,000 watts unlimited
- Transmitter coordinates: 36°3′2.00″N 89°22′7.00″W
- Repeater: 101.7 W269CE (Dyersburg)

Links
- Public license information: Public file; LMS
- Webcast: Listen live
- Website: wtroradio.net

WTRO (1450 AM) is a radio station broadcasting an oldies music format. Licensed to Dyersburg, Tennessee, United States, the station is currently owned by Burks Broadcasting, through licensee Dr Pepper Pepsi-Cola Bottling Company of Dyersburg, LLC (dba Burks Beverage).
