= WJKD =

- Vero Beach, Florida; United States
- Broadcast area: Treasure Coast
- Frequency: 99.7 MHz
- Branding: 99.7 Jack FM

Programming
- Format: Variety hits
- Affiliations: Jack FM

Ownership
- Owner: Treasure & Space Coast Radio; (Vero Beach Broadcasters, LLC)
- Sister stations: WGYL, WOSN, WTTB

History
- First air date: March 27, 1992; 33 years ago
- Former call signs: WWDO (1992–1995); WPAW (1995–2001); WGNX (2001–2006)
- Call sign meaning: Jack Florida

Technical information
- Licensing authority: FCC
- Facility ID: 70001
- Class: C2
- ERP: 50,000 watts
- HAAT: 134 meters (440 ft)
- Transmitter coordinates: 27°44′7.00″N 80°27′27.00″W

Links
- Public license information: Public file; LMS
- Website: 997jackfm.com

WJKD (99.7 FM) is a radio station licensed to Vero Beach, Florida, and serving the Treasure Coast. It broadcasts a variety hits radio format, carrying the syndicated Jack FM service. The station is owned by Treasure & Space Coast Radio with the license held by Vero Beach Broadcasters, LLC.

WJKD has an effective radiated power (ERP) of 50,000 watts. Its transmitter is on 77th Avenue at 66th Street in Winter Beach, Florida.

== History ==
The station signed on the air on March 27, 1992, as WWDO-FM. From 1995 to 2001, the station carried a country music format, and branded itself as Panther Country 99.7, with the call sign, WPAW.

On March 5, 2001, the station changed to a 1980s hits format. and rebranded as 99.7 GNX to reflect the new call letters WGNX, and its slogan "The Music of Generation X". In 2003, WGNX added a few hits from the 1970s and 1990s to its playlist, making it more like a variety hits station, while still imaging around Generation X. In 2004, WGNX tried playing alternative rock music on Saturday nights. However, the idea did not go over well, and the station cancelled the show.

In December 2006, WGNX rebranded as 997 Jack FM, and changed its call letters to WJKD. Jack FM's playlist features hit music across multiple genres (mostly pop and rock) from the 1960s to the present day. The slogan, Playing What We Want, promotes Jack FM as having a larger playlist with more variety than most commercial radio stations.
