= KYJK =

- Missoula, Montana; United States
- Broadcast area: Missoula, Montana
- Frequency: 105.9 MHz
- Branding: '105.9 Jack FM

Programming
- Format: Adult hits

Ownership
- Owner: Missoula Broadcasting Company, LLC
- Sister stations: KDTR; KKVU

History
- First air date: May 5, 2005
- Former call signs: KKNS-FM (2005–2006)
- Call sign meaning: "Jack"

Technical information
- Licensing authority: FCC
- Facility ID: 162326
- Class: C2
- ERP: 1,950 watts
- HAAT: 635 meters (2,083 ft)
- Transmitter coordinates: 46°48′5.7″N 113°58′25.5″W

Links
- Public license information: Public file; LMS
- Website: www.jackfmmissoula.com

KYJK (105.9 FM, "105.9 Jack FM") is a commercial radio station licensed to Missoula, Montana, owned by Missoula Broadcasting Company, LLC. KYJK airs an adult hits music format, using the trademarked "Jack FM" handle.
