= WASL (FM) =

- Dyersburg, Tennessee; United States
- Broadcast area: Dyersburg, Tennessee
- Frequency: 100.1 MHz
- Branding: 100.1 Jack FM

Programming
- Format: Variety hits
- Affiliations: Jack FM network Premiere Networks

Ownership
- Owner: Burks Broadcasting; (Dr Pepper Pepsi-Cola Bottling Company of Dyersburg, LLC)
- Sister stations: WTRO, WTNV

History
- First air date: 1968
- Former call signs: WTRO-FM (1968–1975)

Technical information
- Licensing authority: FCC
- Facility ID: 17509
- Class: C2
- ERP: 26,000 watts
- HAAT: 206 meters (676 ft)
- Transmitter coordinates: 36°6′0.00″N 89°29′12.00″W

Links
- Public license information: Public file; LMS
- Webcast: Listen live
- Website: 100jackfm.com

WASL (100.1 FM, "Jack FM") is a commercial radio station broadcasting a variety hits format. Licensed to Dyersburg, Tennessee, United States, the station is owned by Burks Broadcasting, through licensee Dr Pepper Pepsi-Cola Bottling Company of Dyersburg, LLC (dba Burks Beverage).

== History ==
On March 5, 2015 WASL changed their format from mainstream rock (branded as "SL100") to variety hits, branded as "100 Jack FM".
