= CKKQ-FM =

Radio station in Victoria, British Columbia

Coordinates: 48°35′40″N 123°32′42″W

- Victoria, British Columbia; Canada
- Broadcast area: Greater Victoria
- Frequency: 100.3 MHz
- Branding: 100.3 The Q

Programming
- Format: Classic rock

Ownership
- Owner: Jim Pattison Group
- Sister stations: CJZN-FM

History
- First air date: December 12, 1987; 38 years ago

Technical information
- Licensing authority: CRTC
- Class: C
- ERP: 47,600 watts (average); 100,000 watts (peak horiz.)
- HAAT: 494 metres (1,621 ft)
- Repeater: 94.7 CKKQ-FM-1 (Sooke)

Links
- Webcast: Listen live
- Website: theq.fm

CKKQ-FM (100.3 MHz) 100.3 The Q is a commercial FM radio station in Victoria, British Columbia, Canada. It is owned by the Jim Pattison Group with studios on Quadra Street. It broadcasts a classic rock radio format.

CKKQ is a Class C station with an effective radiated power (ERP) of 47,600 watts (100,000 watts peak horizontal polarization). The transmitter tower is atop Malahat Ridge, off the Trans-Canada Highway in Bamberton.

== History ==
=== Rock station Q-100 ===
In April 1987, the OK Radio Group Ltd. (known at the time as Victoria Communications Ltd.) was granted a construction permit to start a new FM station. CKKQ signed on the air on December 12, 1987, as "Q-100", with a rock format. The first song played was The Rolling Stones' "Start Me Up".

The station has broadcast a rock format since its inception. It has had a more classic rock sound since 2001, when sister station CKXM AM/-FM became CJZN-FM "The Zone @ 91.3" airing an alternative rock format. For a time, CKKQ had an adult album alternative (AAA) lean until The Jim Pattison Group took over the station from OK Radio.

In May 1999, CKKQ and its sister station moved to the top floor of 2750 Quadra Street. It is a three-storey Victoria office building purchased by the OK Radio Group Ltd. in the fall of 1998 and equipped with new radio studios.

=== Transmitter and Pattison ownership ===
Thanks to the prime position of CKKQ's transmitter on the Malahat Ridge, its signal reaches up Vancouver Island as far north as Nanaimo, onto the Lower Mainland as far east as Langley and into Washington as far south as Everett. In 2000, CKKQ added a transmitter in Sooke on 94.7 MHz with the call sign CKKQ-FM-1.

On December 1, 2006, CKKQ and CJZN-FM came under the ownership of the Jim Pattison Broadcast Group LP.

=== The Q Morning Show ===
One of the original 26 employees, Ed Bain has spent more than three decades of his career at CKKQ hosting The Q Morning Show. Bain was born in 1955. The QMS (short for Q Morning Show) lineup consists of Bain and news/sports announcer Cliff LeQuesne. While there have been multiple producers, newscasters and sports announcers, Ed Bain has been the one constant on the show since CKKQ's launch.

Bain is also the CHEK-TV weather forecaster. He became well known in Victoria from public appearances for CKKQ, both in person and as part of outdoor advertising. Bain's visibility greatly improved when, in 2001, he became the full-time weekday weather reporter for Victoria television station CHEK-TV. He injects much of the same humour to his weather forecasts that he is known for on The Q Morning Show, albeit slightly toned down for his television audience.
