= WGGH =

Coordinates: 37°43′47″N 88°53′44″W

- Marion, Illinois; United States
- Broadcast area: Marion-Carbondale, Illinois
- Frequency: 1150 kHz
- Branding: "Monster Radio FM 98.5 AM 1150"

Programming
- Format: Talk
- Affiliations: Genesis Communications Network; Salem Radio Network; Townhall; USA Radio Network; Westwood One; Motor Racing Network

Ownership
- Owner: Fishback Media Inc.

History
- First air date: September 24, 1949

Technical information
- Licensing authority: FCC
- Facility ID: 70253
- Class: D
- Power: 5,000 watts day; 44 watts night
- Translator: (98.1 MHz) W251DC (Marion)

Links
- Public license information: Public file; LMS
- Webcast: Listen Live
- Website: wggh.net

WGGH (1150 AM, "Monster Radio") is a radio station licensed to serve the community of Marion, Illinois, United States. The station, established in 1949, is currently owned and operated by Fishback Media, Inc. WGGH broadcasts a mix of conservative talk and Christian talk to the greater Marion-Carbondale area. The station signed on an FM translator signal on 98.5 in May 2018.

== Programming ==
WGGH airs a mix of local and syndicated news and talk programming with a conservative or religious bent. Notable weekday programming includes The Dennis Miller Show in late mornings, a block of local news and ministry programs in early afternoons, plus Focus on the Family and The Dave Ramsey Show in late afternoons. Weekend programming includes local sports, legal, and religious discussion programs, plus a variety of church services and more classic country music. WGGH also broadcasts the high school football games of the Marion Wildcats.

== History ==
WGGH began daytime-only broadcast operations on September 24, 1949, with 500 watts of power under the ownership of general manager Hartley Grisham and chief engineer George W. Dodds, a partnership doing business as the Marion Broadcasting Company. Dodds bought out Grisham to become sole owner of the station in 1955. At the same time, Dodds relocated WGGH to its current broadcast facility and got authorization from the Federal Communications Commission (FCC) to increase the station's signal strength to 5,000 watts.

In May 1991, station owner George W. Dodds, trading as Marion Broadcasting Company, reached an agreement to sell WGGH to Tri-State Christian TV, Inc. The FCC dismissed this application on January 13, 1992. In February 1992, Dodds reached a new sale agreement with Vine Broadcasting, Inc., and filed a new application with the FCC. The FCC approved the transfer of the broadcast license on April 7, 1992, and the transaction was formally consummated on June 9, 1992. After this sale and more than 40 years of station ownership, Dodds retired from broadcasting. He died in May 2005.

Johnny and Elaine Gomez, owners of Vine Broadcasting, maintained the station's longtime religious broadcasting format. After 15 years of ownership, Vine Broadcasting agreed to sell WGGH to Fishback Media, Inc., in June 2007. The transfer gained FCC approval on August 28, 2007, and the transaction was consummated on September 17, 2007. New owner and Marion native Jimmy "Fish" Fishback retained the station's Southern Gospel format until switching to its current format on November 4, 2008. Fishback is a veteran broadcaster, voice artist, and syndicated radio host. His credits include promos for Showtime's Masters of Horror and providing the imaging voice of "V Rock" in Grand Theft Auto: Vice City Stories.

Longtime St. Louis television personality "Uncle Erv" Coppi got his start in broadcasting at WGGH. His on-air duties included spinning big band records to create the illusion of live concert broadcasts.

== Community involvement ==
Each Christmas season, WGGH decorates its broadcast facilities with a computer-controlled light show and encourages visitors to donate canned good for a local food pantry or money for a nearby children's home. In addition to its regular programming, WGGH also serves the community by broadcasting high school homecoming parades, greetings to the troops, local high school sports, plus synchronized music for the town's Fourth of July fireworks show.
