= Al Wasl =

Al Wasl may refer to:

- Al Wasl, a historical reference to the emirate of Dubai
- Al Wasl, Dubai, a locality within the modern emirate of Dubai
- Al Wasl Road, D 92 an intra-city route in Dubai
- Al Wasl SC, a Dubai-based multi-sports Club
- Al-Wasl F.C., a football club in the United Arab Emirates
