= CHST-FM =

Radio station in London, Ontario

Coordinates: 42°56′59″N 81°15′52″W

- London, Ontario; Canada
- Broadcast area: Southwestern Ontario
- Frequency: 102.3 MHz
- Branding: Jack 102.3

Programming
- Format: Adult hits

Ownership
- Owner: Rogers Radio; (Rogers Media, Inc.)

History
- First air date: 2000

Technical information
- Class: C1
- ERP: 20,400 watts average 100,000 watts peak
- HAAT: 128.8 metres (423 ft)

Links
- Website: jack1023.com

CHST-FM (102.3 MHz) is a Canadian radio station in London, Ontario. The station uses the on-air brand and format Jack 102.3. CHST broadcasts from the CFPL-TV tower in Southwest London. Due to CHST's low ERP relative to some London area radio stations, its broadcast signal covers only Middlesex, Elgin, and Oxford counties. The station's coverage to the west is impeded by co-channel WGRT in Port Huron, Michigan.

== History ==
Approved by the CRTC in 1999, CHST was launched by CHUM Limited in 2000. It originally used the brand Star 102.3 with a hot adult contemporary format, but was rebranded as the adult hits format Bob FM in July 2003.

On June 21, 2010, CTVglobemedia announced it had entered into an agreement to sell the station to Rogers Media. The sale was approved by the CRTC on December 22, 2010.

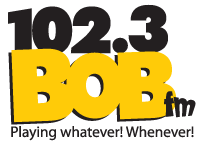
"Bob FM" logo under Rogers ownership, 2010-2014

On September 12, 2012, Rogers received approval to increase the station's effective radiated power from 5,840 to 20,400 watts (directional antenna with a maximum ERP from 12,100 to 100,000 watts), and change its class from B1 to C1.

Following the acquisition, the station continued to use the "Bob" name (which was associated with Bell Media stations) until August 28, 2014, when it adopted the Jack FM brand (as with other Rogers-owned adult hits stations).

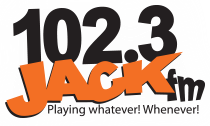
Former "Jack FM" logo
