= CHTT-FM =

Radio station in Victoria, British Columbia

Coordinates: 48°25′17″N 123°30′40″W

- Victoria, British Columbia; Canada
- Broadcast area: Greater Victoria
- Frequency: 103.1 MHz
- Branding: Jack 103.1

Programming
- Format: Adult hits

Ownership
- Owner: Rogers Radio; (Rogers Media, Inc.)
- Sister stations: CIOC-FM

History
- First air date: April 1, 1923
- Former call signs: CFCL (1923–1925); CFCT (1925–1941); CJVI (1941–2000)
- Former frequencies: 410 metres (1923–1925); 910 kHz (AM) (1925–1928); 630 kHz (1928–1933); 1430 kHz (1933–1935); 1450 kHz (1935–1941); 1480 kHz (1941–1945); 900 kHz (1945–2000)
- Call sign meaning: From previous "Hot" branding

Technical information
- Class: B
- ERP: 9,400 watts average 20,000 watts peak
- HAAT: 147.4 metres (484 ft)

Links
- Webcast: Listen Live
- Website: jack1031.ca

CHTT-FM (103.1 FM) is a commercial radio station licensed in Victoria, British Columbia, Canada. The station is owned by Rogers Radio, a division of Rogers Sports & Media, and airs an adult hits format branded as "Jack 103.1". Its studios are at 817 Fort Street in Downtown Victoria.

The transmitter is on Fulton Road in Colwood. The signal can be heard around lower Vancouver Island and in some sections of Washington state.

== History ==
=== CFCL, CFCT, CJVI ===
The station began broadcasting on April 1, 1923. It was originally on the AM band and had the call sign CFCL. It aired on 410 meters (later on 910 kHz) with 500 watts of power. It was owned by the Centennial Methodist Church and offered Christian radio programming. In 1924, the CFCL studios relocated from the church to the Fletcher Brothers store on Douglas Street in Downtown Victoria. CFCL dropped its religious programming in 1925 when George Deauville bought the station and acquired a new licence for it. He changed its call letters to CFCT and moved its studios to the Bank of Toronto (now part of Toronto-Dominion Bank) building on Douglas Street.

CFCT moved around on the AM band several times during the next 16 years as it switched to 630 kHz in 1928, to 1430 (with a power reduction to 50 watts) in 1933, and then to 1450 in 1935. It increased power back to 500 watts in 1939. With the enactment of the North American Regional Broadcasting Agreement (NARBA) in 1941, it switched to 1480 kHz on March 29, 1941. The Victoria Times-Colonist bought CFCT on October 1, 1941 and sold a half-interest in the station to Taylor, Pearson & Carson Ltd. The two entities formed the Island Broadcasting Co. as CFCT's parent company and changed its call letters to CJVI. It became a charter affiliate of the Canadian Broadcasting Corporation's Dominion Network shortly after its formation in January 1944. When the Dominion Network dissolved in 1962, the station transferred its affiliation to the main CBC radio network.

=== 900 AM ===
CJVI moved to 900 AM on May 15, 1945. Taylor, Pearson & Carson acquired majority ownership of CJVI in 1951, and its studios relocated to its present location at 817 Fort Street in downtown Victoria in 1952. CJVI increased its power to 5,000 watts on July 28, 1954 at 2:26 PM. The boost increased its coverage on Vancouver Island to north of Nanaimo, south to Seattle and east to the Lower Mainland as far as Chilliwack. Power was further increased to 10,000 watts in April 1957. Harold Carson, part of the Taylor, Pearson & Carson firm that owned CJVI, died in 1959, and his company became Selkirk Communications that year.

In 1970, Selkirk acquired 100% ownership of CJVI. It switched to a country format in November 1972 and began branding as VI 90 on January 22, 1979. The country format was dropped for a mix of soft adult contemporary and adult standards music in January 1984 as CJVI began broadcasting in AM stereo. The format switched to full service adult contemporary about a year later. More oldies music was gradually brought into the programming until CJVI had an all-oldies format by 1988. Maclean-Hunter Ltd. bought CJVI parent Selkirk Communications in 1989 and transferred the ownership to Rogers Media immediately afterward. CJVI dropped its CBC affiliation in 1991 (one of the last privately owned former affiliates to do so).

On September 1, 1995, CFMS-FM was purchased by Rogers from then-owner Capital Broadcasting, paired up with CJVI and renamed CIOC-FM on December 11. On April 1, 1997, CJVI dropped its oldies format for a talk radio format, identifying on-air as "AM 900, Victoria's Information Superstation." It dropped that format and returned to oldies music on July 10, 1999.

=== Move to FM ===
On September 2, 2000, CJVI moved to the FM dial. It exchanged frequencies and bands with Camosun College station CKMO. It began broadcasting on 103.1 MHz and became CHTT-FM. At the same time, college radio station CKMO began broadcasting on 900 AM. In 2012, CKMO went dark and the licence was handed in.

CHTT-FM played a Top 40/CHR format branded as "Hot 103." The first song heard on Hot 103 was "Bye, Bye, Bye" by N'Sync. In 2003, the format shifted to hot adult contemporary.

=== Jack FM twice ===
On January 29, 2004, after playing "Love Song" by Sky, CHTT flipped to adult hits branded as Jack FM. The first song played on "Jack" was "Sharp Dressed Man" by ZZ Top.

On February 24, 2015, CHTT flipped back to Top 40/CHR as KiSS 103.1. The last song played on "Jack FM" was "Hit the Road, Jack" by The Stampeders, while the first song on "KiSS" was "Uptown Funk" by Mark Ronson and Bruno Mars.

On August 7, 2019, all of the "KiSS" on-air staff were let go, and the station began promoting a major change to come the following week. On August 15, after playing a block of "goodbye"-themed songs ending with "Bye, Bye, Bye" by N'Sync, CHTT changed its format back to adult hits and returned to its former "Jack" branding. The first song on the newly relaunched "Jack" was "Bohemian Rhapsody" by Queen.
