= KWJK =

- Boonville, Missouri; United States
- Broadcast area: Columbia, Missouri
- Frequency: 93.1 MHz
- Branding: 93.1 Jack FM

Programming
- Format: Adult hits
- Affiliations: Jack FM network

Ownership
- Owner: Billings Broadcasting LLC.
- Sister stations: KWRT

History
- First air date: 1998-07-17 (as KBHO)
- Former call signs: KBHO (1998–2000); KWRT-FM (2000–2005)

Technical information
- Licensing authority: FCC
- Facility ID: 86486
- Class: C3
- ERP: 7,200 watts
- HAAT: 126 meters
- Transmitter coordinates: 38°56′31.00″N 92°34′32.00″W

Links
- Public license information: Public file; LMS
- Webcast: Listen live
- Website: 931jack.fm

KWJK (93.1 FM, "Jack FM") is a radio station broadcasting an adult hits format. Licensed to Boonville, Missouri, United States, the station serves the Columbia, Missouri, area. The station is currently owned by Billings Broadcasting LLC.

== Station History ==
=== 1999-2005: Adult Standards ===
The station was originally owned by Big Country of Missouri, Inc., and was issued the KBHO call sign on July 17, 1998. The KWRT-FM call sign was assigned on June 14, 2000, and coincided with a format change to adult standards as "Casino 93.1." Casino 93.1 was originally simulcast on then-sister station KWRT-AM, and featured the Jones Radio Network's "Music of Your Life" satellite feed.

=== 2005-present: Adult Hits ===
In October 2005, the station dropped adult standards in favor of the ABC Satellite Network's Jack FM feed. In January 2011, Billings Broadcasting LLC purchased KWJK.

For a few years, the station aired a local talk show in the morning, The Tom Bradley Show. Today, the station has no DJs and runs the syndicated version of the Jack FM format that airs across the country.
