= Adult hits =

Radio format focused on older adult contemporary, pop, and mainstream rock hits

Adult hits (sometimes also called variety hits) is a radio format drawing from popular music from the early 1990s to the present. The format typically focuses on classic hits, but blended with adult contemporary, pop, and rock hits from the 1990s through at least the 2010s, and is synonymous with franchised brands such as Jack FM and Bob FM.

== History ==
Forerunners of the adult hits format appeared on radio during the 1970s. At the time, enough of a backlog of popular music from the rock and roll era had developed to support a format based on them; oldies stations, however, were still very rare, and instead, stations that did not want to bind themselves to the current top 40 playlist would mix in current hits with the hits of the past two decades. This hybrid format began to fall out of favor in the 1980s as self-contained oldies stations rose to prominence. The Adult Hits format dates back to 1990 when 98.9 WMMO was launched in Orlando, Florida. Another predecessor was the short-lived "rhythm and rock" format run by KYOT in Phoenix, Arizona in the early 1990s. Adult hits stations target adults 25–54, and more specifically at 35- to 44-year-olds. Freeform could also be seen as another forerunner due to the freedom of music choice the DJ's had, very similar to what makes up the core basis of the adult hits format.

A large number of adult hits stations utilize male names as their branding. The practice was popularized by the franchised Jack FM and Bob FM brands, and has been widely imitated with other common male names.

=== Related formats ===
- "Traditional country" is a format of country music that focuses primarily on country hits from the 1980s through the 2000s, with a particular focus on neotraditional, country pop, and country rock, as well as contemporary songs that fit within these styles (including newer songs by artists who were prominent during that era). The format generally avoids Bluegrass music, as well as "bro-country" songs (which carry stronger influence from pop and hip-hop).
- A Spanish-language variation of the format, "Jose FM", is syndicated by Entravision.

== Formatting ==
The adult hits format draws from a wide playlist of broad appeal, consisting primarily of adult contemporary, pop, and rock hits from the early 1990s through at least the mid-2010s—including but not limited to pop-punk, post-grunge, emo, pop ballad, and dance pop, among others. The size of their music library and their focus on the 25-54 demographic provide a contrast to other stations, which may heavily play certain popular songs throughout the day. While the format initially consisted of 1970s and 1980s pop and rock when it began in the early 2000s, most of the pre-1990 catalog has since moved to the classic hits format.

Due to its broad nature, the adult hits format can be easily automated. This means that the station can be run with little to no on-air personalities (a trait that, in some cases, may be openly promoted by the station), leaving only staff involved in station operations, advertising sales, and promotional presences. However, some adult hits stations may still maintain a full airstaff.

== Radio stations ==
=== Canada ===
Bell Media and Rogers Media operate chains of adult hits stations under the Bounce Radio and Jack FM brands respectively.

Location	Call sign	Frequency	Brand Name
Belleville, Ontario	CJOJ	95.5 FM	"95-5 Hits FM"
Calgary, Alberta	CJAQ	96.9 FM	"Jack 96.9"
Chatham/Windsor, Ontario	CKUE	95.1 and 100.7 FM	"Cool FM"
Edmonton, Alberta	CKNG	92.5 FM	"92.5 The Chuck"
Halifax, Nova Scotia	CFLT	92.9 FM	"Jack 92.9"
London, Ontario	CHST	102.3 FM	"Jack 102.3"
Stratford, Ontario	CJCS	107.1 FM	"107.1 Juice FM"
Montreal, Quebec	CKDG*	105.1 FM	"Mike FM"
Grande Prairie, Alberta	CIKT	98.9 FM	"Q99"
Regina, Saskatchewan	CKCK	94.5 FM	"Jack 94.5"
Saskatoon, Saskatchewan	CFWD	96.3 FM	"96.3 Cruz FM"
St. John's, Newfoundland and Labrador	CKSJ	101.1 FM	"Coast 101.1"
Sudbury, Ontario	CHNO	103.9 FM	"Rewind 103.9
Vancouver, British Columbia	CJAX	96.9 FM	"Jack 96.9"
Vaudreuil-Dorion, Quebec	CJVD	100.1 FM	"CJVD 100,1"
Victoria, British Columbia	CHTT	103.1 FM	"Jack 103.1"
Winnipeg, Manitoba	CFWM	99.9 FM	"Bounce Radio 99.9"

- CKDG: Adult hits only during drive times. All other times station serves as a multicultural station.

=== United States ===
Location	Call sign	Frequency	Brand Name
Abilene, Texas	KTJK	106.3 FM	"The Raider"
Albuquerque, New Mexico	KDRF	103.3 FM	"Ed FM"
Altoona, Pennsylvania	WYUP	107.1 FM / 1400 AM	"Jack FM"
Anchorage, Alaska	KBBO-FM	92.1 FM	"BOB FM"
Appleton, Wisconsin	WYDR	94.3 FM	"Jack FM"
Auburn, Alabama	WQNR	99.9 FM	"Kate FM"
Austin, Texas	KBPA	103.5 FM	"Bob FM"
Bad Axe, Michigan	WLEW-FM	102.1 FM	"Cruise 102.1"
Bakersfield, California	KGFM	101.5 FM	"Big FM"
Baltimore, Maryland	WQSR	102.7 FM	"Jack FM"
Bloomington-Normal, Illinois	WBBE	97.9 FM	"Bob FM"
Boise, Idaho	KSRV-FM	96.1 FM	"Bob FM"
Bonham, Texas	KFYN	103.9 FM / 1420 AM	"Rewind 103.9"
Boston, Massachusetts	WBGB	103.3 FM	"Big 103"
Bowling Green, Kentucky	WKLX	100.7 FM	"Sam FM"
Calabash, North Carolina	WYNA	104.9 FM	"Bob FM"
Cambria, California	KCJZ	105.3 FM	"Bob FM"
Cape Cod, Massachusetts	WFRQ	93.5 FM	"Frank FM"
Casper, Wyoming	KRVK	107.9 FM	"Jack FM"
Charleston, South Carolina	WAVF	101.7 FM	"Chuck FM"
Charlotte, North Carolina	WLKO	102.9 FM	"The Lake"
Chico, California	KBQB	92.7 FM	"Bob FM"
Cleveland, Ohio	WHLK	106.5 FM	"The Lake"
Clinton, Iowa	KMCN	94.7 FM	"Mac FM"
Columbia, Missouri	KWJK	93.1 FM	"Jack FM"
Columbia, South Carolina	WLTY	96.7 FM	"Steve FM"
Columbus, Ohio	WODC	93.3 FM	"The Bus"
Dallas, Texas	KJKK	100.3 FM	"Jack FM"
Decatur, Illinois	WEJT	105.1 FM	"Jack FM"
Des Moines, Iowa	KDRB	100.3 FM	"The Bus"
Dyersburg, Tennessee	WASL	100.1 FM	"Jack FM"
Edwards, California	KGBB	103.9 FM	"Bob FM"
Emporia, Kansas	KANS	96.1 FM	"Bob FM"
Elko, Nevada	KLKO	93.7 FM	"Jack FM"
Erie, Pennsylvania	WXBB	94.7 FM	"Bob FM"
Eugene, Oregon	KEUG	105.5 FM	"Bob FM"
Fairbanks, Alaska	KTDZ	103.9 FM	"Ted FM"
Fargo, North Dakota	KRWK	101.9 FM	"Jack FM"
Fayetteville, North Carolina	WFLB	96.5 FM	"Bob FM"
Fort Myers, Florida	WJGO	102.9 FM	"Bob FM"
Fort Wayne, Indiana	WWFW	103.9 FM	"Wayne FM"
Grand Forks, North Dakota	KGFK	95.7 FM/1590 AM	"The Forks"
Greensboro, North Carolina	WSMW	98.7 FM	"98.7 Simon"
Hampton Roads-Norfolk, Virginia	WNOB	93.7 FM	"Bob FM"
Hartford, Connecticut	WHCN	105.9 FM	"The River"
Hendersonville, North Carolina	WMYI	102.5 FM	"The Lake"
Hudson, Wyoming	KTUG	105.1 FM	"Jack FM"
Jackson, Tennessee	WMXX-FM	103.1 FM	"Kool Mix 103.1"
Johnstown, Pennsylvania	WKGE	101.3 FM / 850 AM	"Jack FM"
Jonesboro, Arkansas	KDRS-FM	92.7 FM	"Jack FM"
Joplin, Missouri	KMXL	95.1 FM	"Mike FM"
Kalamazoo, Michigan	WVFM	106.5 FM	"Jack FM"
Kansas City, Missouri	KCKC	102.1 FM	"Bob FM"
Knoxville, Tennessee	WNFZ	94.3 FM	"Jack FM"
Lafayette, Indiana	WBPE	95.3 FM	"Bob FM"
Lansing, Michigan	WHZZ	101.7 FM	"Mike FM"
Lakeland, Florida	WWRZ	98.3 FM	"Max FM"
Las Vegas, Nevada	KYMT	93.1 FM	"Neon 93.1"
Lexington, Kentucky	WLXX	101.5 FM	"Jack FM"
Lincoln, Nebraska	K277CA	103.3 FM	"Mix 103.3"
Little Rock, Arkansas	KCON	92.7 FM	"Jack FM"
Lompoc, California	KBOX	104.1 FM	"Pirate Radio"
Los Angeles, California	KCBS-FM	93.1 FM	"Jack FM"
Loudonville, New York	WVCR	88.3 FM	"The Saint"
Louisa, Virginia	WOJL	105.5 FM	"Sam FM"
Madison, Wisconsin	WXXM	92.1 FM	"Rewind 92.1"
Milwaukee, Wisconsin	WRIT-FM	95.7 FM	"BIG FM"
Minneapolis-St. Paul, Minnesota	KZJK	104.1 FM	"Jack FM"
Missoula, Montana	KYJK	105.9 FM	"Jack FM"
Morgantown, West Virginia	WZST	100.9 FM	"Jack FM"
Muncie, Indiana	WERK	104.9 FM	"WERK-FM"
Myrtle Beach, South Carolina	WYNA	104.9 FM	"Bob FM"
Nashville, Tennessee	WCJK	96.3 FM	"Jack FM"
Norwalk/Sandusky/Port Clinton, Ohio	WLKR-FM	95.3 FM	"95-3 WLKR"
Ottawa, Illinois	WRKX	95.3 FM	"Jack FM"
Owensboro, Kentucky	WTCJ	98.7 FM / 106.7 FM / 1230 AM	"Jack FM"
Panama City, Florida	WASJ	105.1 FM	"Bob FM"
Pearl, Mississippi	WPBP-LP	104.3 FM	"Power 104.3 The Pirate"
Philadelphia, Pennsylvania	WBEN-FM	95.7 FM	"Ben FM"
Phoenix, Arizona	KYOT	95.5 FM	"The Mountain"
Pittsburgh, Pennsylvania	WRRK	96.9 FM	"Bob FM"
Portland, Oregon	KYCH	97.1 FM	"Charlie FM"
Pueblo, Colorado	KTSC-FM	89.5 FM	"Rev89"
Rainier, Oregon	KPPK	98.3 FM	"The Peak"
Raleigh, North Carolina	WBBB-FM	96.1 FM	"96-1 BBB"
Redding, California	KESR	107.1 FM	"Bob FM"
Redwood Falls, Minnesota	KLGR-FM	97.7 FM	"Jack FM"
Rhinelander, Wisconsin	WRHN	100.1 FM	"Jack FM"
Rochester, New York	WFKL-FM	93.3 FM	"Fickle 93.3"
Rock Springs, Wyoming	KSIT	99.7 FM	"Jack FM"
Rolla, Missouri	KDAA	103.1 FM	"Sam 103.1 (FM)"
Russellville, Arkansas	KCAB	97.1 FM / 980 AM	"Bob FM"
Saginaw, Michigan	WMJO	97.3 FM	"Joe FM"
Sag Harbor, New York	WLNG	92.1 FM	"92.1 WLNG"
San Antonio, Texas	KJXK-FM	102.7 FM	"Bob FM"
San Diego, California	KFBG	100.7 FM	"Big FM"
Seattle, Washington	KJAQ	96.5 FM	"Jack FM"
Sedalia, Missouri	KSDL	92.3 FM	"Bob FM"
Sisseton, South Dakota	KJKQ	99.5 FM	"Jack FM"
Smyrna, Delaware	WRDX	92.9 FM	"Tom-FM"
Spokane, Washington	KBBD	103.9	"Bob FM"
Springfield, Illinois	WCVS-FM	96.7 FM	"Bob FM"
Springfield, Missouri	KRZD	107.5 FM / 1550 AM	"Bob FM"
St. Louis, Missouri	WARH	106.5 FM	"The Arch"
Sterling, Colorado	KSRX	97.5 FM	"Bob FM"
Susanville, California	KAJK	96.3 FM	"Jack FM"
Topeka, Kansas	KSAJ-FM	98.5 FM	"Jack FM"
Traverse City, Michigan	WZTC	104.5 FM	"Bob FM"
Twin Falls, Idaho	KIKX	104.7 FM	"Bob FM"
Tyler, Texas	KOOI	106.5 FM	"Jack FM"
Vero Beach, Florida	WJKD	99.7 FM	"Jack FM"
Victoria, Texas	KTXN-FM	98.7 FM	"Jack FM"
Watertown, New York	WBLH	92.5 FM	"Tunes 92.5"
Wausau, Wisconsin	WOZZ	94.7 FM / 102.9 FM	"Jack FM"
West Plains, Missouri	KSPQ	93.9 FM	"Jack FM"
Wichita, Kansas	KBOB-FM	97.1 FM	"Bob FM"
Wichita Falls, Texas	KWFB	100.9 FM	"Jack FM"
Williston, North Dakota	KDSR	101.1 FM	"Jack FM"
Winfield, Kansas	KSOK-FM	95.9 FM	"Bob FM"

=== Mexico ===
Location	Call sign	Frequency	Brand Name
Mexico City	XHRED-FM	88.1 FM	"Universal 88.1"
Mexico City	XHDFM-FM	106.5 FM	"Mix 106.5"

=== Philippines ===
Location	Call sign	Frequency	Brand Name
Quezon City	DWDM-FM	95.5 FM	"EAGLE FM 95.5"
Pasig	DZRJ-FM	100.3 FM	"RJFM 100.3"
Caloocan City	DWNU	107.5 FM	"Wish 107.5"

=== Europe ===
- Oxfordshire, England – Jack FM
- Cambridgeshire, England – Affinity
- West Leicestershire, England – Oak FM
- North Yorkshire, England – Coast & County Radio
- The Netherlands – Jack FM
- Gdynia, Poland – Jack FM
- Berlin, Germany – Jack FM
- Vienna, Austria – Radio 88.6

=== New Zealand ===
- New Zealand (Nationwide) – Classic Hits FM

=== Russia ===
- Moscow, Russia – KEKC 89.9
- Saint Petersburg, Russia – KEKC 91.1

== Satellite radio ==
- Sirius Satellite Radio – Sirius Super Shuffle channel 12
- XM Satellite Radio – Pink channel 24

== See also ==
- Adult album alternative
- Adult contemporary music
- Classic hits
- Freeform (radio format)
- Jack FM
- Oldies
