= KFMU-FM =

Radio station in Oak Creek, Colorado

- Oak Creek, Colorado; United States
- Frequency: 104.1 MHz
- Branding: Colorado's Finest, Heritage Rock; Solar Powered Radio

Programming
- Format: Adult Album Alternative (AAA)

Ownership
- Owner: Patricia MacDonald Garber and Peter Benedetti; (AlwaysMountainTime, LLC)

History
- Former call signs: KFMU (1975–1980)

Technical information
- Licensing authority: FCC
- Facility ID: 34434
- Class: C3
- ERP: 1,400 watts
- HAAT: 327.0 meters (1,072.8 ft)
- Transmitter coordinates: 40°14′10″N 106°52′30″W
- Translator: 105.5 K288BQ (Steamboat Springs)

Links
- Public license information: Public file; LMS
- Webcast: Listen Live
- Website: kfmuradio.com

KFMU-FM (104.1 FM) is a radio station broadcasting an Adult Album Alternative (AAA) music format. Licensed to Oak Creek, Colorado, United States, the station is currently owned by Patricia MacDonald Garber and Peter Benedetti, through licensee AlwaysMountainTime, LLC, Eli "The Prize Guy" Campbell is on the air weekdays 6a-12n, Kasey Lane is on weekdays 12pm-6pm and KFMU airs the Putumayo World Music Hour, Acoustic Cafe and Elwood's Bluesmobile every weekend.
