= Maeser, Utah =

- CDP
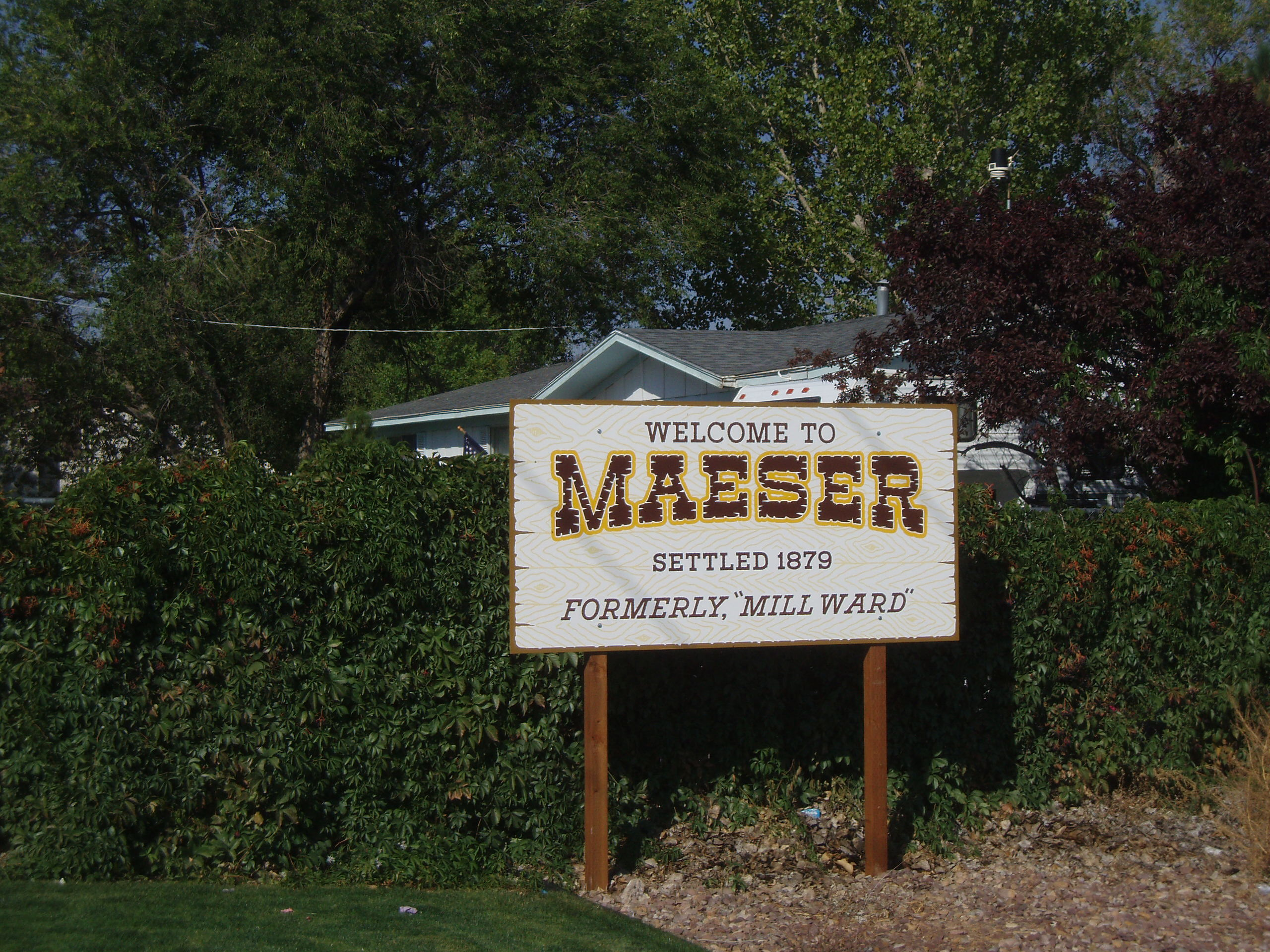
- Welcome sign

- Location in Uintah County and the state of Utah
- Coordinates: 40°27′58″N 109°34′53″W
- Country: United States
- State: Utah
- County: Uintah
- Named for: Karl G. Maeser

Area
  - Total: 6.5 sq mi (16.8 km^{2})
  - Land: 6.5 sq mi (16.8 km^{2})
  - Water: 0 sq mi (0.0 km^{2})
- Elevation: 5,600 ft (1,707 m)

Population (2020)
  - Total: 4,081
  - Density: 629/sq mi (242.9/km^{2})
- Time zone: UTC-7 (Mountain (MST))
  - Summer (DST): UTC-6 (MDT)
- ZIP code: 84078
- Area code: 435
- FIPS code: 49-47180
- GNIS feature ID: 1430036

Maeser (/ˈmeɪzər/ MAY-zər) is a census-designated place (CDP) in Uintah County, Utah, United States. The population was 4,081 at the 2020 census, an increase over the 2010 figure of 3,601. The village is named after Karl Maeser, an educator.

== History ==
Maeser was first settled in 1878. It became an incorporated municipality in 1935, but disincorporated on July 9, 1970.

== Geography ==
According to the United States Census Bureau, the CDP has a total area of 6.5 square miles (16.8 km^{2}), all land.

The community is west of U.S. Route 191 in the Ashley National Forest.

== Demographics ==
Historical population
Census	Pop.	Note	%±
1940	428		—
1950	643		50.2%
1960	929		44.5%
1970	1,248		34.3%
1980	2,216		77.6%
1990	2,598		17.2%
2000	2,855		9.9%
2010	3,601		26.1%
2020	4,081		13.3%
Source: U.S. Census Bureau

=== 2020 census ===
As of the 2020 census, Maeser had a population of 4,081. The median age was 32.1 years. 34.6% of residents were under the age of 18 and 12.9% of residents were 65 years of age or older. For every 100 females there were 93.3 males, and for every 100 females age 18 and over there were 90.2 males age 18 and over.

80.9% of residents lived in urban areas, while 19.1% lived in rural areas.

There were 1,354 households in Maeser, of which 40.3% had children under the age of 18 living in them. Of all households, 65.0% were married-couple households, 13.3% were households with a male householder and no spouse or partner present, and 18.2% were households with a female householder and no spouse or partner present. About 18.4% of all households were made up of individuals and 9.0% had someone living alone who was 65 years of age or older.

There were 1,481 housing units, of which 8.6% were vacant. The homeowner vacancy rate was 1.9% and the rental vacancy rate was 14.1%.

Racial composition as of the 2020 census
Race	Number	Percent
White	3,665	89.8%
Black or African American	11	0.3%
American Indian and Alaska Native	46	1.1%
Asian	16	0.4%
Native Hawaiian and Other Pacific Islander	14	0.3%
Some other race	88	2.2%
Two or more races	241	5.9%
Hispanic or Latino (of any race)	294	7.2%

=== 2000 census ===
As of the census of 2000, there were 2,855 people, 900 households, and 766 families residing in the CDP. The population density was 439.7 people per square mile (169.8/km^{2}). There were 954 housing units at an average density of 146.9/sq mi (56.8/km^{2}). The racial makeup of the CDP was 96.99% White, 0.07% African American, 1.02% Native American, 0.25% Asian, 1.09% from other races, and 0.60% from two or more races. Hispanic or Latino of any race were 2.35% of the population.

There were 900 households, out of which 46.3% had children under the age of 18 living with them, 76.6% were married couples living together, 5.8% had a female householder with no husband present, and 14.8% were non-families. 13.1% of all households were made up of individuals, and 6.4% had someone living alone who was 65 years of age or older. The average household size was 3.16 and the average family size was 3.48.

In the CDP, the population was spread out, with 36.3% under the age of 18, 7.1% from 18 to 24, 24.9% from 25 to 44, 21.4% from 45 to 64, and 10.4% who were 65 years of age or older. The median age was 32 years. For every 100 females, there were 97.2 males. For every 100 females age 18 and over, there were 98.3 males.

The median income for a household in the CDP was $40,779, and the median income for a family was $43,625. Males had a median income of $40,857 versus $25,100 for females. The per capita income for the CDP was $14,975. About 6.1% of families and 6.5% of the population were below the poverty line, including 6.4% of those under age 18 and 5.7% of those age 65 or over.

== See also ==
- List of census-designated places in Utah
