= NRG Media =

American media company

NRG Media, LLC
- Type: Private
- Industry: Entertainment
- Founded: 2005; 21 years ago
- Headquarters: Cedar Rapids, Iowa
- Key people: Mary Quass (CEO & president)
- Products: Radio
- Revenue: ▲$125 million+USD
- Number of employees: 450+/-
- Website: nrgmedia.com

NRG Media, LLC is a media company headquartered in Cedar Rapids, Iowa and was founded in 2005.

== History ==
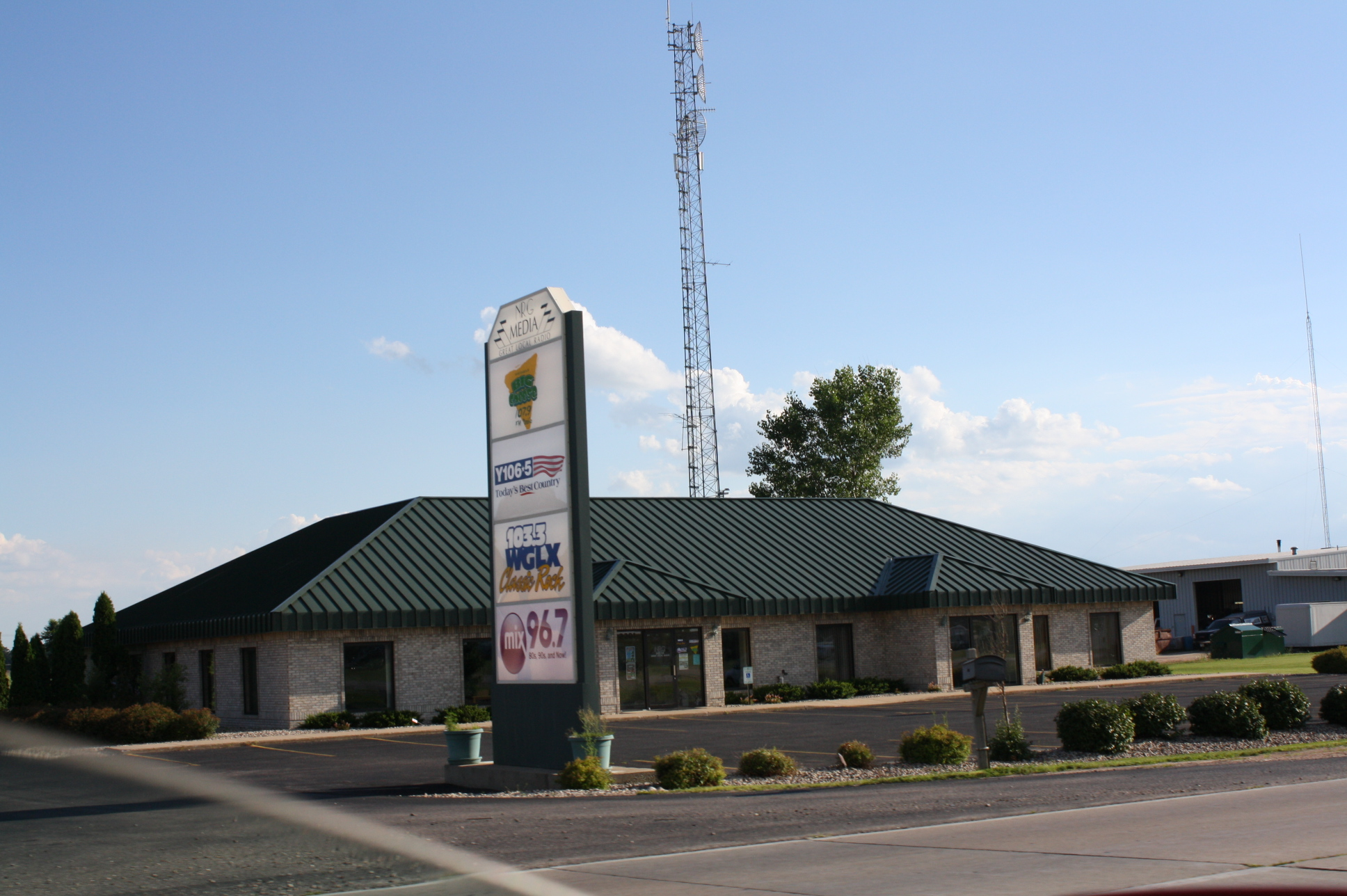
Studios in Wausau-Stevens Point, Wisconsin

NRG Media was founded on March 1, 2005, as a result of a merger of NewRadio Group and the radio assets of Waitt Media. At its inception it was the seventh largest radio company in the USA. As of July 2026, NRG owns and operates 20 radio stations across the midwestern states.

Mary Quass is NRG Media's President/CEO. Mentoring and Inspiring Women in Radio (MIW) Group named Mary Quass the 2017 MIW Trailblazer.

Since 2023, NRG began to downsize its portfolio by selling its stations to other Media Companies. In February, NRG sold its Salem stations to South Central Illinois Multimedia for $500,000 which included WJBD, WSIQ and its translator W221DU 92.1. On March 7, 2024, NRG Sold its Dixon Cluster to Shaw Media for $950,000.

On July 18, 2025, NRG Media sold KMMQ and its translator K258DC 99.5 to Munoz Media for $400,000. On November 26, 2025, NRG Media sold its Central Nebraska stations to Usher Media Group for $3.75 Million. In February 2, 2026, NRG Media sold its 5 stations Omaha cluster to Usher Media Group for $2.15 Million while Nebraska Public Media acquired KOOO for $1.2 Million.

On March 19, 2026. NRG Media sold its Wisconsin stations to Midwest Communications for $2.5 Million. On March 31, 2026, Connoisseur Media announced its intent to purchase NRG Media's Lincoln cluster $5.75 Million.

On September 18. 2026, NRG Media sold its Headquarters stations to Civic Media for $1.1 Million which is currently under LMA.

== Former properties ==
- Waitt Radio Networks (purchased by Triton Media Group)
