= KOBM =

KOBM may refer to:

- KOBM-FM, a radio station (97.3 FM) licensed to serve Blair, Nebraska, United States
- KXCB, a radio station (1420 AM) licensed to Omaha, Nebraska, which held the call sign KOBM from 2019 to 2022
- KIBM, a radio station (1490 AM) licensed to Omaha, Nebraska, which held the call sign KOBM from 2018 to 2019
