= KSPI =

KSPI may refer to:

- KSP Interstellar a Mod for the computergame Kerbal Space Program
- The ICAO code for Abraham Lincoln Capital Airport
- KSPI (AM), a radio station (780 AM) located in Stillwater, Oklahoma, United States
- KSPI-FM, a radio station (93.7 FM) located in Stillwater, Oklahoma, United States
