= KQCH =

Contemporary hit radio station in Omaha

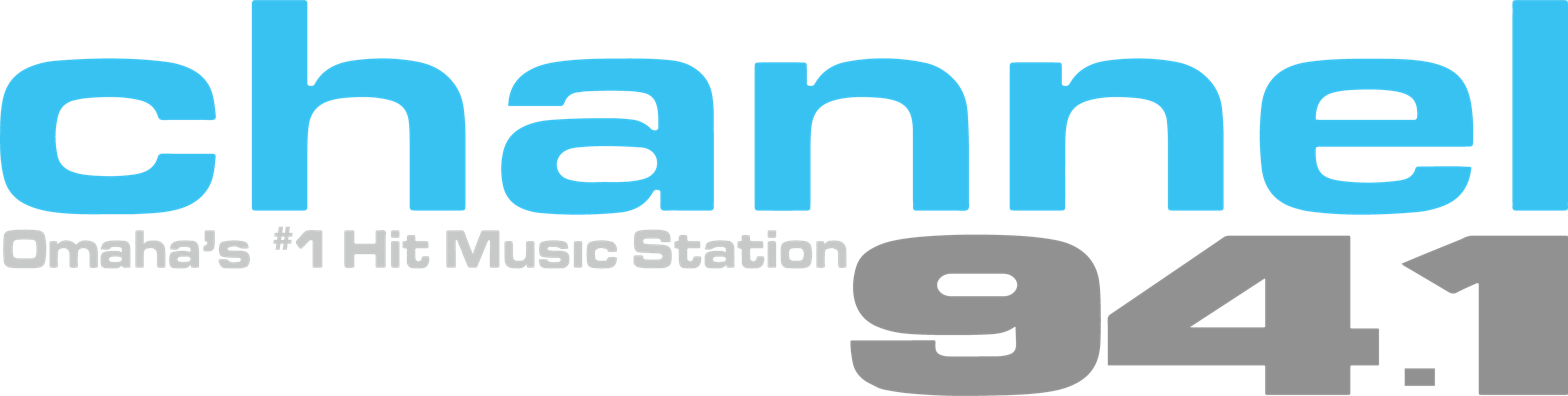
- Omaha, Nebraska; United States
- Broadcast area: Omaha–Council Bluffs metropolitan area
- Frequency: 94.1 MHz (HD Radio)
- Branding: Channel 94-1

Programming
- Format: Contemporary hit radio
- Affiliations: Premiere Networks

Ownership
- Owner: SummitMedia; (SM-KQCH, LLC)
- Sister stations: KEZO-FM; KKCD; KSRZ; KXSP

History
- First air date: 1959
- Former call signs: KMEO (1959–1968); KOWH-FM (1968–1979); KYNN-FM (1979–1983); WOW-FM (1983–2001); KMXM (2001–2002)
- Call sign meaning: "Omaha's Channel" (Q in place of O)

Technical information
- Licensing authority: FCC
- Facility ID: 50314
- Class: C
- ERP: 100,000 watts
- HAAT: 361 meters (1,184 ft)
- Transmitter coordinates: 41.304°N 96.028°W

Links
- Public license information: Public file; LMS
- Webcast: Listen live
- Website: www.channel941.com

KQCH (94.1 FM) is a contemporary hit radio station in Omaha, Nebraska, serving the Omaha–Council Bluffs metropolitan area. It is owned by SummitMedia. KQCH's studios are located on Mercy Road in Omaha's Aksarben Village, while its transmitter is located off North 72nd Avenue and Crown Point at the Omaha master antenna farm.

== History ==
The 94.1 frequency was originally KOAD, owned by the Omaha World-Herald, and launched on 94.3 FM in 1941. This lasted until 1949, when it moved to 94.1 and went silent. In 1959, it returned to the air as KMEO, where it had a middle of the road format until 1968, when it became album-oriented rock station KOWH-FM. By the early 1970s, KOWH-FM switched formats to R&B. This lasted until April 1979, when it was sold to Great Empire Broadcasting and flipped to country music as KYNN-FM. In September 1983, it became WOW-FM and retained the country format, where it enjoyed a successful 17-year run. Journal Broadcasting would buy out Great Empire in 1999. On October 10, 2000, WOW-FM changed its call letters and re-branded to KSSO, "Kiss Country", which prompted a cease and desist letter from Clear Channel Communications – who had previously trademarked and service-marked the "Kiss" name and had recently launched a "Kiss" station in nearby Lincoln, Nebraska. A couple of months later, they modified the call letters and became KMXM "Max Country" on January 2, 2001.

KQCH's origins began on May 21, 1999, when KESY (97.7 FM) flipped from adult contemporary to rhythmic contemporary as "Channel 97.7". The station became a serious challenger to KQKQ-FM during its three years on the 97.7 frequency. On May 3, 2002, at noon, Journal Broadcasting moved KQCH from 97.7 to 94.1 as "Channel 94.1". The station continued in a rhythmic direction until 2004, when it shifted to a more mainstream (and slightly adult-leaning) direction after KQKQ flipped to adult Top 40. In early September 2012, KQCH received direct competition when iHeartMedia (then Clear Channel)'s KQBW flipped to Top 40.

Journal Communications and the E. W. Scripps Company announced on July 30, 2014, that the two companies would merge to create a new broadcast company under the E. W. Scripps Company name that owned the two companies' broadcast properties, including KQCH. The transaction was completed in 2015. Scripps exited radio in 2018; the Omaha stations went to SummitMedia in a four-market, $47 million deal completed on November 1, 2018.
