= Koterba =

Koterba is a surname. Notable people with the surname include:

- Ed Koterba (1919–1961), American journalist
- Jeff Koterba (born 1961), American editorial cartoonist
