= Omaha World-Herald =

Daily newspaper published in Omaha, Nebraska

- Type: Daily newspaper
- Format: Broadsheet
- Owner: Lee Enterprises
- Founded: August 24, 1885; 140 years ago
- Headquarters: 1314 Douglas Street; Suite 1500; Omaha, Nebraska 68102
- Country: United States
- Circulation: 58,514 Daily; 63,319 Sunday (as of 2023)
- ISSN: 2641-9653
- OCLC number: 1585533
- Website: omaha.com

The Omaha World-Herald is a daily newspaper in the midwestern United States, the primary newspaper of the Omaha-Council Bluffs metropolitan area.

It was locally owned from its founding in 1885 until 2020, when it was sold to the newspaper chain Lee Enterprises by its most recent local owner, Warren Buffett, chairman of Omaha-based Berkshire Hathaway.

For more than a century, it circulated daily throughout Nebraska – a state that is 430 miles (690 km) long. It also circulated daily throughout all of Iowa, and in parts of Kansas, South Dakota, Missouri, Colorado, and Wyoming. It retrenched during the 2008 financial crisis, ending far-flung circulation and restricting daily delivery to an area in Nebraska and Iowa within an approximately 100-mile (160 km) radius of Omaha.

== Background ==
The newspaper was the world's last to print both daily morning and afternoon editions, a practice it ended in March 2016.

The World-Herald was the largest employee-owned newspaper in the United States from 1979 until 2011: Omaha construction magnate Peter Kiewit bought the newspaper and its television station, the local ABC affiliate, in 1962 for $40.1 million from Omaha-based World Publishing Co. Upon Kiewit's death in 1979, he arranged for the paper to be spun off to its employees. At the time, the newspaper reported daily circulation of 235,589 and Sunday circulation of 301,682.

Upon his death, Kiewit, who had run a Fortune 500 construction and mining company, also had arranged to keep 20 percent of the resulting Omaha World-Herald Co. in the hands of the Peter Kiewit Foundation. The foundation's hold of 20 percent of the company's shares kept the newspaper from being easily sold to an out-of-town competitor – the fate of many major metropolitan newspapers during the 1970s through the 1990s: Its ownership structure was called "the most bullet-proof in the industry" when it came to corporate takeovers.

In 2011, Omaha native Warren Buffett purchased the paper for $200 million through his holding company, Berkshire Hathaway. The newspaper's stock had clocked a compound annual growth rate of 18% from 1985 through 2007, but the 2008 financial crisis affected it financially. Employees were said to be ready to cash out, with the blessing of the Kiewit Foundation: Even as the newspaper had been able to maintain a circulation penetration rate in its home market that ranked as the U.S.'s seventh-highest, its circulation by the time of the sale had fallen to 170,455 daily and 228,344 on Sunday.

Buffett's BH Media Group was unable to turn around the precipitous fall in circulation and advertising revenue, and Buffett eventually threw in the towel, selling The World-Herald and its other stable of newspapers to Lee Enterprises for $140 million in cash in January 2020. Buffett had said the previous year that newspapers were "toast." Buffett financed the Lee purchase, which also refinanced Lee's debt so that Berkshire would become its sole lender, for $576 million at a 9 percent interest rate. The transaction did not include the newspaper's physical property, which Lee entered into an agreement to lease from Berkshire.

As of 2020, The World-Herald for the first time since its founding in 1885 is no longer locally owned. Lee is based in Davenport, Iowa. The New York Stock Exchange warned Lee in 2020 that its stock was at risk of de-listing because of its persistently low share price below $1.00 a share; it re-listed its stock on the Nasdaq exchange in 2021 and has said it has a plan for re-focusing its newspapers to digital.

The newspaper's newsroom staff has shrunk substantially, from more than 200 in 2015 to 118 at the beginning of 2018 – to 62 by the end of 2020, according to its news staff's union.

The newspaper closed its Washington, D.C. bureau in 2020. It was among the first – if not the first – metropolitan newspapers from outside the capital area to open its own Washington bureau, with archives dating back to at least 1893 carrying bylines from The World-Herald's bureau in the capital.

In November 2025, The World-Herald moved to a six day printing schedule, eliminating its printed Monday edition.

== Broadcasting ==
The World-Herald brought the ABC network to Omaha in 1957 when it opened its television station. The ABC affiliate, which the newspaper brought to air on Sept. 15, 1957, was broadcast on Channel 7 under the call letters KETV. KETV was marketed as "Omaha World-Herald Television," and was owned by Herald Corp., a fully owned subsidiary of The World-Herald's publisher, World Publishing Co. It was the Omaha area's third television station, behind WOWT and KMTV-TV.

Peter Kiewit and Sons, Inc., the construction and mining company that had bought The World-Herald's holding company in 1962 for $40 million, sold the KETV television station in 1976 to St. Louis-based Pulitzer Inc., the parent company of the St. Louis Post-Dispatch, for $9 million in cash. Pulitzer eventually spun its broadcast division off to Hearst Communications, KETV's current owner.

The newspaper operated the KOWH and KOAD-FM radio stations from their founding in 1941. On KOWH, the Top 40 radio format was invented by Todd Storz, who had bought the radio stations from The World-Herald and operated them under the Mid-Continent Broadcasting Co. name.

== Pulitzer Prizes ==
The World-Herald has won three Pulitzer Prizes, including the esteemed Pulitzer Prize for Public Service, awarded in 1943.

- 1920 Pulitzer Prize for Editorial Writing: Harvey E. Newbranch for an editorial entitled "Law and the Jungle", which decried the lynching of a black man on the lawn of the Douglas County Courthouse. Newbranch was the first editorial writer to win a Pulitzer under his own name—as opposed to awards for unsigned staff editorials—in opinion writing.
- 1943 Pulitzer Prize for Public Service: For its initiative and originality in planning a statewide campaign for the collection of scrap metal for the war effort. The Nebraska plan was adopted on a national scale by the daily newspapers, resulting in a united effort which succeeded in supplying American war industries with necessary scrap material.
- 1944 Pulitzer Prize for Photography: Earle L. Bunker for his photo entitled "Homecoming".

== History and Supreme Court Case ==
The newspaper was founded in 1885 by U.S. Sen. Gilbert M. Hitchcock, as the Omaha Evening World. The first issue was published on August 24, 1885. It purchased George L. Miller's Omaha Herald in 1889.

The paper was established as an independent political voice but quickly moved to the Democratic Party column. Former U.S. Secretary of State, U.S. Rep. and three-time presidential candidate William Jennings Bryan, a Democrat and onetime member of the Populist Party, was its editor in 1894–1896. Hitchcock, meanwhile, served three terms in the U.S. House of Representatives and, starting in 1911, two Senate terms. The World-Herald was a more objective voice than the Omaha Bee, which tended to sensationalize news to drum up sales. (Note: The Omaha Daily Bee was founded in 1871; Hearst acquired the newspaper, then named the Bee-News, in 1928. In 1937 Hearst sold the Bee-News to the World-Herald, which discontinued its publication.)

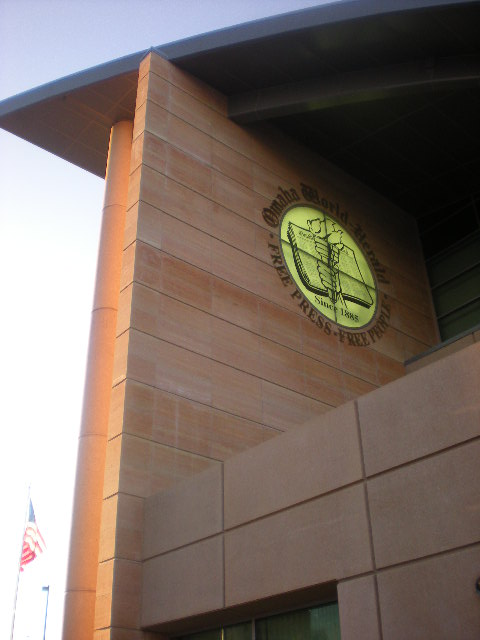
The World-Herald's "Free Press - Free People" logo on its printing plant, named the Freedom Center

Hitchcock's son-in-law, Henry Doorly, took control of the paper after his death in 1934. The editorial page began leaning Republican after Hitchcock's death. Over his lifetime, Doorly served 58 years at the paper.

In 1962, the World Publishing Company, owned solely by heirs of the Hitchcock/Doorly families, was on the verge of selling The World-Herald to the Newhouse chain, but instead accepted an offer from local construction magnate Peter Kiewit. When he died, Kiewit left provisions in his will to ensure that the paper would remain locally owned, with a large part of the plan securing employee ownership.

On May 8, 1974, the World-Herald was the first paper in the United States to call for Richard Nixon to resign after the full content of the White House tapes became known. The newspaper, whose conservative editorial page had endorsed Nixon three times, called for his resignation under the headline: "A Matter of Morality: Nixon Should Resign." Time magazine 12 days later called the World-Herald's editorial "startling" and labeling it seeming "apostasy."

Throughout the mid to late 20th Century, the newspaper was a major force for press freedom: Former publisher Harold Andersen, who ran the company from 1966 until 1989, was chairman of the World Press Freedom Committee, chairman of the International Federation of Newspaper Publishers and chairman of the American Newspaper Publishers Association. He also was a longtime board member of The Associated Press.

Most significantly, the newspaper was the lead in the landmark 1976 Supreme Court case Nebraska Press Association vs. Stuart, which was seen as one of the "Big Three" cases pertaining to the press and freedom of speech; the others were New York Times Co. vs. Sullivan and New York Times Co. vs. the United States. As for its case, The World-Herald was said to be "adamant" about taking the issue all the way to the Supreme Court after a Nebraska judge, Hugh Stuart, had tried to implement a gag order on reporting the details of a local criminal trial.

The Supreme Court decision, which was unanimous, strongly underlined the First Amendment concept of "no prior restraint". World-Herald Editor G. Woodson Howe was head of the association, which was funded in large part by the World-Herald. The case was argued by E. Barrett Prettyman and Floyd Abrams.

Chief Justice of the United States Warren E. Burger wrote the opinion of the court. "Prior restraints on speech and publication are the most serious and least tolerable infringement on First Amendment Rights," he wrote. "The press does not simply publish information about trials, but guards against the miscarriage of justice by subjecting the police, prosecutors, and judicial processes to extensive public scrutiny and criticism," he said in the opinion.

== Expansion ==
The World-Herald Co. during the 1980s and 1990s substantially expanded its business from its sole newspaper: In 1990 it purchased the Brookings Register and Huron Plainsman in South Dakota for an undisclosed price. In 1993 it purchased the Carlsbad Current-Argus in New Mexico for an undisclosed price. In 1994, it purchased The Record in Stockton, California, for an undisclosed price; it sold the newspaper in 2004 to Dow Jones, publisher of The Wall Street Journal, for $144 million. In 1999, it purchased the Ames Tribune in Iowa for an undisclosed price from former NBC News President Michael Gartner.

The newspaper also partially owned the world's largest elections equipment maker and election operations servicing company, Omaha-based Election Systems and Software. It sold its share of the business, which it purchased in 1986, in 2011 for an undisclosed amount.

On November 30, 2011, the Omaha World-Herald Company announced that Berkshire Hathaway, headed by Omaha native Warren Buffett, would buy the newspaper for $200 million, including debt. Also included in the sale were the World-Herald subsidiary newspapers in Council Bluffs, Iowa, Kearney, Nebraska, Grand Island, Nebraska, York, Nebraska, North Platte, Nebraska and Scottsbluff, Nebraska.

In 2012 it purchased the Waco Tribune and the Bryan-College Station Eagle, both in Texas, for an undisclosed price. In 2012 the company now under Berkshire Hathaway ownership purchased all of the assets of the Media General company, including the Richmond Times-Dispatch and the Tulsa World, for $142 million in cash; the deal did not include Media General's Tampa Tribune property. The company also purchased WPLG-TV, the ABC affiliate in Miami, under Berkshire Hathaway ownership.

In January 2020, Lee Enterprises announced an agreement with Berkshire Hathaway to acquire BH Media Group's publications and The Buffalo News for $140 million. The deal did not include the WPLG-TV television station in Miami, which Berkshire continued to own as of 2021.

== Website, printing plant and headquarters ==
The Omaha World-Herald operates the website Omaha.com, the Omaha area's most popular website by all measures of traffic. In April 2021, it saw monthly unique visits to its website of 2.51 million.

The company dubs its downtown Omaha print production center the John Gottschalk Freedom Center, named after a former publisher of the newspaper who also was national president of the Boy Scouts of America from 2008 to 2010.

The Freedom Center also houses its three printing presses, which can each print 75,000 papers per hour, and are considered to be some of the most advanced in the world.

The facility was opened in August 2001, and cost almost $125 million to build. It consists of three structures designed by HDR, Inc. They include a five-level, 321,000-square-foot (29,800 m^{2}) press hall featuring three MAN Roland presses from Germany; a 20,000-square-foot (1,900 m^{2}) paper-storage facility capable of storing 3,000 rolls of newsprint and a 600-stall parking garage. Large portions of the exterior are glass, allowing downtown traffic to see the storage facility and presses.

The storage facility/press hall is connected by a tunnel than runs underneath 13th Street in Omaha. Most newspaper facilities of this size have been built on greenfield sites: The Omaha World-Herald was dedicated to keeping its newspaper facilities downtown, which required a more vertical structure, and the tunnel. Transfer Vehicle System (TVS) robotic vehicles are used to deliver newsprint to the press.

The presses weigh 1,661 U.S. tons and can produce 75,000 newspapers per hour. The John Gottschalk Freedom Center produces four editions of the Omaha World-Herald daily, in addition to a Sunday edition and daily editions of the Daily NonPareil for neighboring Southwest Iowa.

Construction of the modern facility served as the impetus for redesigning the layout of the actual newspaper.

In 2006, the company purchased the 16-story former Northwestern Bell/Qwest Communications building in downtown Omaha as a new base for its news, editorial, circulation and business operations.

In 2026, it was announced that the facility would close, and that the World-Herald would instead contract its printing to a USA Today Co. owned facility in Des Moines, Iowa.

== Controversies ==
Former publisher Harold Anderson had reportedly supported Lawrence E. King Jr. and the Franklin Community Federal Credit Union. John DeCamp alleged in 1990 that five men, including King, Anderson, and former World-Herald reporter Peter Citron, of involvement in the Franklin child prostitution ring allegations. He also accused the World-Herald of improperly investigating the scandal. Anderson, Citron, and World-Herald editor G. Woodson Howe denied DeCamp's allegations. However, Citron was convicted of sexual assault against two children later that year. Citron was fired from the paper after his arrest.

== Notable staff ==
- Gilbert M. Hitchcock: founder, editor (Omaha World)
- George L. Miller: founder (Omaha Herald)
- Thomas Tibbles: assistant editor (Omaha Herald)
- Elia W. Peattie: Chief editorial writer, 1889–1896
- William Jennings Bryan: Editor, 1894–1896
- Henry Doorly: Editor, publisher, 1934–1950
- Peter Kiewit: Owner, 1963–1979
- Harvey E. Newbranch: Writer, winner of 1920 Pulitzer Prize for editorial writing at the paper
- Paul Henderson: reporter, winner of the Pulitzer Prize for Investigative Reporting in 1982 when working at The Seattle Times
- John Gottschalk: Former publisher and CEO; former World-Herald Co. chairman; philanthropist
- Terry J. Kroeger: Former publisher and CEO of both BH Media Group and The Omaha World-Herald Co. Now owner of Smith Kroeger Advertising based in Omaha, Nebraska.
- Jeff Koterba: Editorial cartoonist since 1989
- James Keogh: Reporter
- Ed Koterba, writer and photographer
- Jim Minge: Entertainment and broadcast news columnist, 1993–2000
- Rainbow Rowell: Author (1995–2012)

== See also ==
- Omaha Daily Bee
- History of Omaha, Nebraska
