= KBBX-FM =

Radio station in Nebraska City, Nebraska

- Nebraska City, Nebraska; United States
- Broadcast area: Omaha, Nebraska; Lincoln, Nebraska
- Frequency: 97.7 MHz (HD Radio)
- Branding: Lobo 97.7 FM

Programming
- Format: Regional Mexican
- Subchannels: HD3: KIBM simulcast
- Affiliations: News Channel Nebraska (weather)

Ownership
- Owner: Flood Communications of Omaha, LLC

History
- First air date: 1980
- Former call signs: KNCY-FM (1980–1995); KOSJ (1995–1998); KESY (1998–1999); KQCH (1999–2002)

Technical information
- Licensing authority: FCC
- Facility ID: 47957
- Class: C1
- ERP: 100,000 watts
- HAAT: 298 meters (978 ft)
- Translator: HD3: 106.7 K294DJ (Lincoln)

Links
- Public license information: Public file; LMS
- Webcast: Listen live
- Website: lobo977.com

KBBX-FM (97.7 MHz, "Lobo 97.7") is a radio station broadcasting a regional Mexican format. Licensed to Nebraska City, Nebraska, United States, the station serves the Omaha and Lincoln metropolitan areas. The station is owned by Flood Communications of Omaha, LLC. KBBX-FM's studios are located on John Galt Boulevard in Omaha, while its transmitter is located just north of Weeping Water, Nebraska.

== History ==
=== Easy listening (1980–1995) ===
The station signed on in 1980 as KNCY-FM, and aired an easy listening format.

=== Rock (1995) ===
In February 1995, KNCY-FM flipped to a rock format as KNBQ; however, this would only last a short time.

=== Smooth jazz (1995–1998) ===
In September 1995, the station flipped to smooth jazz as KOSJ. The flip brought the format back to the market for the first time since 1991, when KKCD flipped to classic rock. The format, however, still was not met with acceptance in the market.

=== Soft adult contemporary (1998–1999) ===
On January 9, 1998, the frequency became home to KESY's soft AC format after their former frequency flipped to modern AC as KSRZ.

=== Rhythmic hits (1999–2002) ===
On May 21, 1999, the station flipped to a rhythmic-leaning Top 40 format, branded as "Channel 9-7-7", and adopted the new call sign KQCH. Despite the station's limited signal, KQCH was a ratings success.

=== Spanish (2002–present) ===
As part of a major format shuffle, on May 3, 2002, at Noon, KQCH's format moved to the more powerful 94.1 FM frequency. After a week of simulcasting, and airing a loop redirecting listeners to the new frequency, on May 10, 97.7 adopted sister KBBX's regional Mexican format as "Radio Lobo." The station would adopt the KBBX-FM call sign on the same day as the switch.

In 2004, KBBX-FM won the prestigious Crystal Award from the National Broadcasters Association for outstanding community service. Radio Lobo was the very first Spanish radio station in American history to win this award. Each spring and fall for the past 11 years, Radio Lobo coordinates and hosts Nebraska's only Bilingual Latino Career Fair. Businesses and services that need to hire bilingual employees of all levels get to meet hundreds of bilingual Latinos looking progress in their careers.

Journal Communications later sold the station to Connoisseur Media in 2006, and then to Flood Communications in 2014.

In May 2024, KBBX activated HD Radio operations.

== Achievements ==
2004- Crystal Award from the National Broadcasters Association for outstanding community service.

2005- Nebraska Broadcasters Association awarded KBBX-FM the Gold Award for service to Business Industry, Government or Education.

2006- KBBX-FM helped raise $79,054 for The Kids of St. Judes.

2007- Barrientos Scholarship Foundation Third Annual Latino Heritage Awards named KBBX-FM Business of the Year.

2012- KBBX-FM received Station of the Year by Medallas de Cortez.

2012- Omaha mayor Jim Suttle proclaimed March 22, 2012 Radio Lobo Day.

2015- Greater Omaha Chambers awarded KBBX-FM with the Small Business Award.

KBBX-FM also helps the Children's Miracle Network Radiothon and for years has gained recognition from the Children's Hospital and Medical Center.
