= KSRZ =

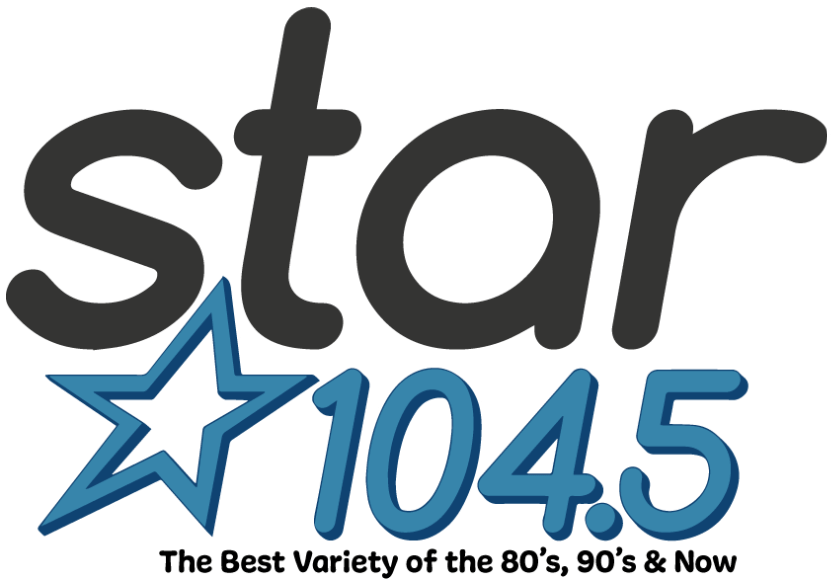
- Omaha, Nebraska; United States
- Broadcast area: Omaha-Lincoln-Council Bluffs
- Frequency: 104.5 MHz (HD Radio)
- Branding: Star 104.5

Programming
- Format: Adult contemporary

Ownership
- Owner: SummitMedia; (SM-KSRZ-FM, LLC)
- Sister stations: KEZO-FM; KKCD; KQCH; KXSP

History
- First air date: May 12, 1972
- Former call signs: KOOO-FM (1972–1979); KESY-FM (1979–1997)
- Call sign meaning: Star

Technical information
- Licensing authority: FCC
- Facility ID: 50308
- Class: C0
- ERP: 100,000 watts
- HAAT: 331.7 meters (1,088 ft)
- Transmitter coordinates: 41°18′16″N 96°1′42.1″W

Links
- Public license information: Public file; LMS
- Webcast: Listen live
- Website: www.104star.com

KSRZ (104.5 FM, "Star 104.5") is a commercial radio station licensed to Omaha, Nebraska, United States. Owned by SummitMedia, it airs an adult contemporary format, with studios located on Mercy Road in Omaha's Aksarben Village.

KSRZ's transmitter is sited at the Omaha master antenna farm on North 72nd Street and Crown Point.

== History ==
The station signed on the air in May 12, 1972, as KOOO-FM, the sister station to KOOO (1420 AM, now KXCB). The two stations broadcast a country music format and were owned by Pier San of Nebraska, Inc. KOOO-FM's power was only 31,000 watts, a fraction of its current output.

In 1979, the station changed its call letters to KESY, and flipped to a largely automated beautiful music format. It played quarter-hour sweeps of soft instrumental music, mostly cover versions of popular adult songs with Broadway and Hollywood show tunes. Throughout the early 1980s, KESY was used as the audio on a local Limelight Movie Channel when it signed off the air for the night.

By the late 1980s, the audience for easy listening music was aging, so KESY added more vocals to its playlist to entice younger listeners. In 1989, KESY evolved to soft adult contemporary music, adopted the moniker "Y 104", and used live DJs.

On January 9, 1998, KESY moved to the 97.7 FM frequency. After a few days of simulcasting, 104.5 FM flipped to modern adult contemporary (which emphasizes on more modern rock hits targeting a female audience) as "Star 104.5", with new call letters KSRZ. The format later evolved to a more broad-based hot adult contemporary format.

By 2008, KSRZ repositioned to a mainstream adult contemporary format, with a heavy reliance on songs from the 1980s.

Journal Communications and the E. W. Scripps Company announced on July 30, 2014, that the two companies would merge to create a new broadcast company under the E. W. Scripps Company name that owned the two companies' broadcast properties, including KSRZ. The transaction was completed in 2015. Scripps exited radio in 2018; the Omaha stations went to SummitMedia in a four-market, $47 million deal completed on November 1, 2018.
