= KIBM =

Oldies radio station in Omaha, Nebraska, United States

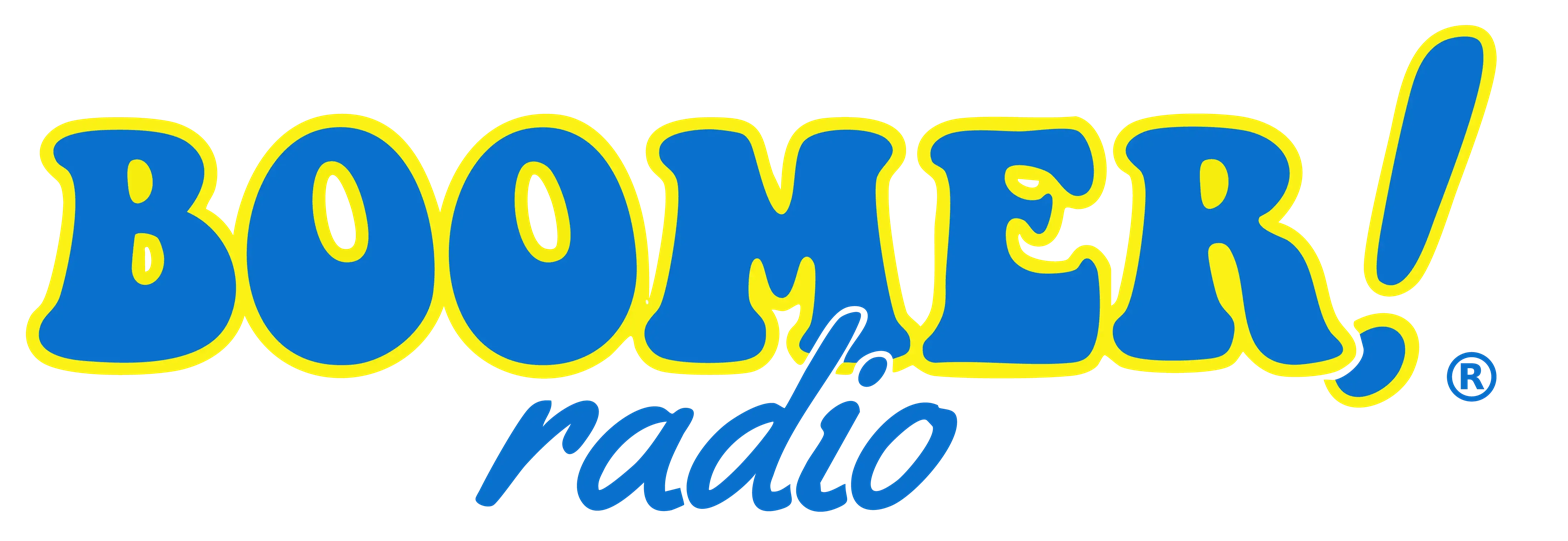
- Omaha, Nebraska; United States
- Broadcast area: Omaha–Council Bluffs metropolitan area
- Frequency: 1490 kHz
- Branding: Boomer Radio

Programming
- Format: Oldies
- Affiliations: Chicago Cubs; Omaha Beef

Ownership
- Owner: Steven Seline; (Walnut Radio, LLC)
- Sister stations: KCRO; KFMT-FM; KHUB; KOBM-FM; KXCB; WOW

History
- First air date: March 1942
- Former call signs: KONB (1940–1941, CP); KBON (1941–1970); KLNG (1970–1977); KYNN (1977–1985); KEDS (1985–1987); KEZO (1987–1996); KOSR (1996–2005); KOMJ (2005–2018); KOBM (2018–2019)
- Call sign meaning: "Boomer"

Technical information
- Licensing authority: FCC
- Facility ID: 74104
- Class: C
- Power: 970 watts (day); 900 watts (night)
- Transmitter coordinates: 41°18′47″N 96°0′37.1″W
- Translators: 94.5 K233CO (Omaha); 104.1 K281DG (Omaha); 106.7 K294DJ (Lincoln)
- Repeaters: 1420 KXCB (Omaha); 97.3 KOBM-FM (Blair); 97.7 KBBX-HD3 (Nebraska City)

Links
- Public license information: Public file; LMS
- Webcast: Listen live
- Website: www.myboomerradio.com

KIBM (1490 AM) is a commercial radio station licensed to Omaha, Nebraska, United States, serving the Omaha–Council Bluffs metropolitan area. KIBM airs an oldies format known as "Boomer Radio." It is owned and operated by Steven Seline, through licensee Walnut Radio, LLC. The studios and offices are on Burt Street in Omaha. KIBM's transmitter is sited near South 38th Street and Wright Street in the Hanscom Park neighborhood near Downtown Omaha. Programming is also heard on two FM translators at 94.5 and 104.1 MHz in Omaha.

== History ==
=== Early years ===
The station signed on the air in March 1942. The original call sign was KBON and the power was 250 watts, a fraction of its current output. It was owned by Inland Broadcasting and was a network affiliate of the Mutual Broadcasting System.

After 28 years as KBON, the station changed to KLNG on July 1, 1970, and flipped to an all-news format. By early 1977, KLNG identified as "Newsradio 149". However, on June 1 of that year, KLNG became KYNN and took on a country music format. On April 9, 1985, at 6 a.m., the station flipped to oldies as KEDS. Due to poor ratings, on July 2, 1987, KEDS dropped the oldies format and began simulcasting the album rock format on KEZO-FM. The station took the call sign KEZO.

In October 1993, KEZO began adding more sports-oriented programming by becoming the new affiliate for the Omaha Royals and Omaha Lancers, as well as Nebraska baseball games. It later broke from the simulcast with the FM altogether and flipped to sports radio, the first station of its kind in the Omaha market. The Journal Broadcast Group bought the station in October 1994. KEZO adopted the KOSR call sign on April 1, 1996. The sports format continued until April 25, 2005, when it swapped formats with KOMJ (590 AM), and took on KOMJ's adult standards format and call letters.

=== Cochise Radio Partners ===
The Journal Broadcast Group sold the station to Cochise Radio Partners in 2007, and the intention was for KOMJ's studios to be relocated. But on August 1, 2013, a Federal Communications Commission (FCC) agent attempted to inspect the studios of KOMJ. The on-file address, 10714 Mockingbird Drive, is the studio for Journal's television station, KMTV-TV and their then-radio sisters, and had never been changed, despite Cochise's full relocation of the station. Journal did not lease a studio out to Cochise as part of the sale. Less than a year later, in March 2014, the FCC fined Cochise $17,000, citing with KOMJ's failure to maintain access to their public file (which Journal also did not have on hand) as part of the studio address violation.

On October 17, 2014, Cochise announced the sale of KOMJ to Walnut Radio, LLC for $450,000. The sale between Cochise and Walnut closed on January 2, 2015. Five days later, the station dropped the middle of the road music from its format for adult standards, classic hits, and oldies.

=== Boomer Radio ===
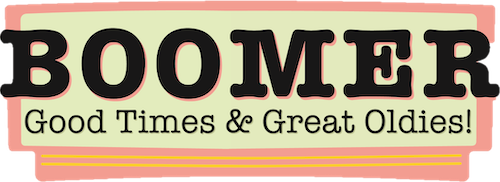
Former logo

At exactly 6:00 p.m. on January 7, "Boomer 1490" (a nod to baby boomers, its core demographic) was officially launched with a live listening party at Gorat's Steakhouse in Omaha. The first song played under the new Boomer format was "Good Vibrations" by The Beach Boys. In June of that year, long time radio legend Dave Wingert became the new Morning Show host. In May 2016, an FM translator was added on 104.1 FM, giving the station an AM/FM combo. The station is now known as "Boomer Radio".

The call sign was changed to KOBM on December 11, 2018. On April 1, 2019, the station changed its call sign to KIBM, with the KOBM call sign moving to 1420 AM (the former KOTK).

== Translator ==
In addition to the main station, KIBM is relayed by two FM translators in the core Omaha metro and suburbs. and one FM translator in Lincoln

Call sign	Frequency	City of license	FID	ERP (W)	HAAT	Class	Transmitter coordinates	FCC info
K233CO	94.5 FM	Omaha, Nebraska	146285	250	98 m (322 ft)	D	41°15′12″N 96°7′8″W	LMS
K281DG	104.1 FM	Omaha, Nebraska	138708	235	120 m (394 ft)	D	41°13′29.6″N 95°57′11.6″W	LMS
K294DJ	106.7 FM	Lincoln, Nebraska	156454	250	76 m (249 ft)	D	40°48′42″N 96°42′11″W	LMS
