= WOW (AM) =

ESPN Radio affiliate in Omaha, Nebraska

- Omaha, Nebraska; United States
- Broadcast area: Omaha-Council Bluffs metropolitan area
- Frequency: 590 kHz
- Branding: WOW AM 590

Programming
- Format: Sports
- Affiliations: ESPN Radio; Westwood One

Ownership
- Owner: Walnut Radio, LLC
- Sister stations: KCRO; KFMT-FM; KHUB; KIBM; KOBM-FM; KXCB

History
- First air date: April 2, 1923
- Former call signs: WOAW (1923–1926); WOW (1926–1999); KOMJ (1999–2005); KXSP (2005–2026)
- Call sign meaning: "Woodmen of the World" (original owners)

Technical information
- Licensing authority: FCC
- Facility ID: 50313
- Class: B
- Power: 5,000 watts
- Transmitter coordinates: 41°18′55″N 95°59′53.1″W

Links
- Public license information: Public file; LMS
- Webcast: Listen live
- Website: www.590wow.com

WOW (590 kHz) is a commercial AM radio station licensed to Omaha, Nebraska, United States. The station is licensed to Walnut Radio, LLC.

WOW is licensed for 5,000 watts, using a non-directional transmitter. Its low frequency, combined with the region's high ground conductivity, allows its signal to be heard in most of the eastern half of Nebraska, as well as parts of Iowa, Missouri, Kansas and South Dakota. It provides grade B coverage as far south as Kansas City as far east as Des Moines, and as far north as Sioux Falls.

== History ==
On April 2, 1923, the station first signed on, owned by the Woodmen of the World life insurance society, using the call sign WOAW. Management originally sought the call letters WOW (for "Woodmen of the World") but they had been assigned to the steamship Henry J. Biddle in 1916. A call sign beginning with "W" was possible in Nebraska because originally the dividing line between "K" and "W" stations followed the western border of Nebraska. WOAW's call sign was issued on November 27, 1922, shortly before the divide was moved to the Mississippi River in January 1923. Moreover, the station was able to claim the WOW call sign on December 16, 1926, after the retirement of the Biddle.

The station eventually became so profitable that it could not remain under the Woodmen society's umbrella without threatening its tax-exempt status. Accordingly, the Woodmen leased the station to a group of local investors who formed Radio Station WOW, Inc., and assigned the license to the group in 1943. The group added a television station (now WOWT) in 1949.

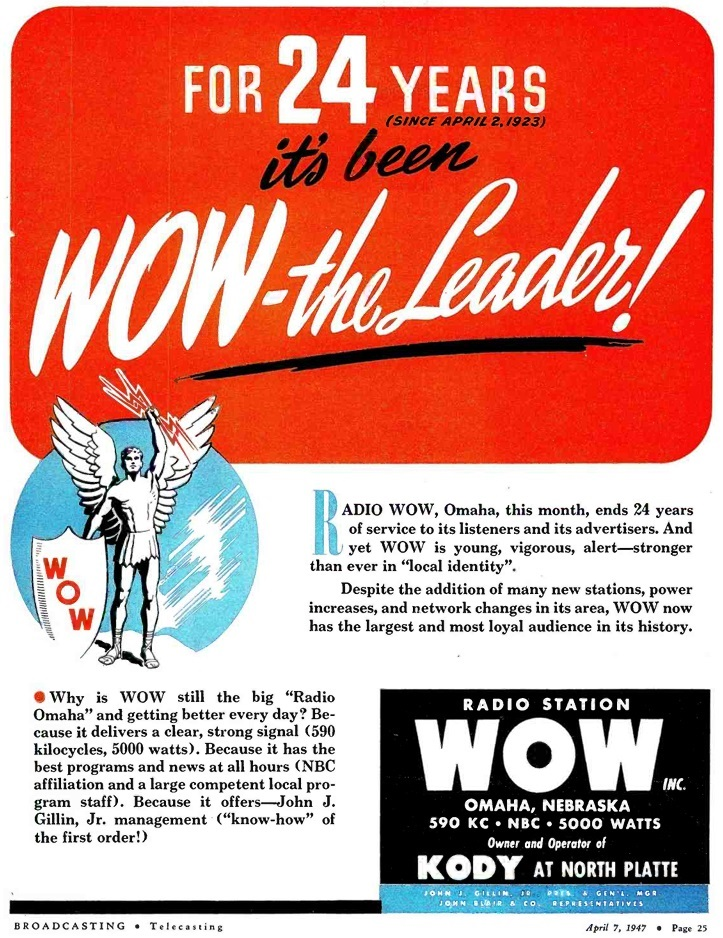
1947 station advertisement.

In 1951, Meredith Corporation bought the WOW stations. In 1955, it dropped WOW's network affiliation with NBC Radio and agreed to switch to CBS Radio as part of a five-station deal covering TV and radio stations in three cities.

Meredith added an FM station in 1961 (now KEZO-FM). WOW became a Top 40 station in the early 1970s, where former Shindig! host Jimmy O'Neill worked for a time. The station switched to a country format in the early 1980s.

Meredith sold WOWT to Chronicle Publishing Company in 1975, but held on to the radio stations until selling to Great Empire Broadcasting in 1983. Journal Broadcast Group bought the radio stations in 1999. On November 22, 1999, the WOW call letters were dropped in favor of KOMJ with adoption of a new format of adult standards, branded as "Magic 590".

On April 25, 2005, KOMJ and then-sister station KOSR (1490 AM) swapped formats, with KOMJ adopting the sports format (as "Big Sports 590") with new call letters KXSP, and 1490 adopting the standards format and KOMJ callsign.

On February 1, 2011, KXSP swapped affiliations with KOZN (1620 AM); KOZN took the Fox Sports Radio affiliation, while KXSP took ESPN. With the affiliation swap, KXSP rebranded as "AM 590 ESPN Radio".

On August 23, 2012, KXSP began airing The Front Stretch Radio Show on Sunday mornings. Originally hosted by Michael Grey, Buddy Ray Jones and Andrew Kosiski, The Front Stretch covered local dirt track racing and NASCAR.

Journal Communications and the E. W. Scripps Company announced on July 30, 2014, that the two companies would merge to create a new broadcast company under the E. W. Scripps Company name that would own the two companies' broadcast properties, including KXSP. The transaction was completed in 2015.

On February 10, 2015, Journal Broadcast Group and the IMG Group announced they had signed a contract for Journal to be the broadcast partner for Nebraska Cornhuskers sports. Effective July 1, 2015, KXSP became the primary station for Nebraska Cornhuskers sports broadcasts, sharing flagship status with Lincoln's KLIN. Co-owned KEZO will simulcast football games, while KKCD will air any volleyball, women's basketball and baseball games that conflict with other athletic events. This ended a nine-decade association between the Huskers and KFAB, the state's most powerful radio station. However, school officials had long felt chagrin at KFAB's unwillingness to air all major sports, and wanted all games to air on a single, powerful station. KXSP's daytime broadcast range is almost as large as that of KFAB's. As mentioned above, this is due to the region's high groundwave conductivity; most 5,000-watt AM stations in the Midwest have daytime footprints comparable to those of full-power FM stations.

Scripps exited radio in 2018; the Omaha stations went to SummitMedia in a four-market, $47 million deal completed on November 1, 2018.

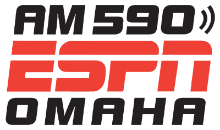
Previous logo

KXSP aired a sports format, and carried the ESPN Radio Network 24 hours a day. Its programming was also carried on the HD2 subchannels of KEZO-FM and KSRZ. Offices and studios were located on Mercy Road in Omaha's Aksarben Village, and the transmitter site was located off Sorensen Parkway in North Omaha. On February 20, 2026, KXSP went silent, after SummitMedia sold the transmitter site.

In April 2026, SummitMedia sold the KXSP license to Walnut Media for $40,000; this sale required an ownership cap waiver as Walnut Media and Hickory Radio had overlapping ownership interests, meaning they would own a combined five AM stations in the Lincoln market. The new owners requested reassignment of the historic WOW call sign, stating that the change to KOMJ in 1999 "by a short-sighted program director ... has haunted the station ever since". This request required waivers of two FCC regulations: Section 73.3550(e), which prohibits the assignment of call signs beginning with the letter "W" to stations located west of the Mississippi River, and Section 73.3550(f), which permits only four letter call signs.

Walnut Media announced the station would resume operations on July 6, 2026, with a mixture of ESPN Radio programming, University of Nebraska Cornhuskers play-by-play, and onetime Omaha sportscaster McGraw Milhaven in late nights. The call sign change to WOW became effective the next day.

== Award ==
WOW received a 1946 Peabody Award for Outstanding Regional Public Service for its program series "Operation Big Muddy".

== See also ==
- List of three-letter broadcast call signs in the United States
