= KFMT-FM =

- Fremont, Nebraska; United States
- Broadcast area: Fremont, Nebraska
- Frequency: 105.5 MHz
- Branding: Mix 105.5

Programming
- Format: Adult contemporary
- Affiliations: ABC News Radio

Ownership
- Owner: Steven W. Seline; (Walnut Radio, LLC)
- Sister stations: KCRO, KHUB, KIBM, KOBM-FM, KXCB, WOW

History
- First air date: 1987
- Call sign meaning: FreMonT

Technical information
- Licensing authority: FCC
- Facility ID: 34549
- Class: A
- ERP: 1,200 watts
- HAAT: 137 meters (449 ft)
- Transmitter coordinates: 41°24′40.00″N 96°31′53.00″W

Links
- Public license information: Public file; LMS
- Webcast: Listen Live
- Website: thebestmix1055.com

KFMT-FM (105.5 MHz) is a radio station broadcasting an adult contemporary format. Licensed to Fremont, Nebraska, United States, the station serves the Fremont area with fringe coverage to west Omaha. The station is currently owned by Steven W. Seline, through licensee Walnut Radio, LLC.

Previous logo
