= The Todd and Tyler Radio Empire =

The Todd-n-Tyler Radio Empire
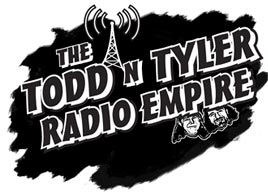
- Genre: Talk
- Running time: 5 hours
- Country of origin: United States
- Home station: KEZO-FM
- Syndicates: Westwood One
- Starring: Todd Brandt, Mike Tyler
- Original release: 1993 – present
- Website: http://www.tntradioempire.com
- Podcast: http://www.art19.com/shows/todd-n-tyler-radio-empire-podcast

The Todd-n-Tyler Radio Empire is a morning drive time radio comedy and talk show based at KEZO-FM in Omaha, Nebraska. It features Mike Tyler and Todd Brandt. The show is syndicated by Westwood One and is heard in Nebraska, Kansas, Oklahoma and Idaho. As of 2011 it was the #1 rated morning program in the Omaha radio market.

== Format ==
The show offers humorous comments on current events, popular culture, reading reddit articles, and life events.

== History ==
Tyler and Brandt first teamed up at WSJW in Harrisburg, Pennsylvania, in February 1993. Previously, Tyler hosted the afternoon show and Brandt was part of the "Starview Morning Show". The duo moved to KEZO in Omaha in August 1993. It became the top-rated morning show in Omaha in 1995 and maintained that spot with the male 25-54 demographic. The show began syndication in November 2006.

Stations
Affiliate	Call letters	City	Started Broadcasting	On Air (Local Time)
Z92	KEZO-FM	Omaha, Nebraska	August 1993	5am - 10am Mon-Fri, Best of the Week 6am-10am Saturday
T95	KICT-FM	Wichita, Kansas	November 2006	5am - 10am Mon-Fri
Pete 94.3	KSPI	Stillwater, Oklahoma		5am - 10am Mon-Fri
104.1 The Blaze	KIBZ	Lincoln, Nebraska	February 2012	5am - 10am Mon-Fri
Rock 103	K227CQ	Sandpoint, Idaho	July 2021	6am - 9am Mon-Fri
Rock 95	KGFK	Grand Forks, North Dakota		5am - 10am Mon-Fri
97.7 The Dawg	KSNP	Burlington, Kansas	January 2026	5am - 10am Mon-Fri

== Cast ==
- Mike Tyler (Mike Kyle). Hometown: Mechanicsburg, Pennsylvania. Attended Millersville University of Pennsylvania. Tyler did several radio jobs in the York/Harrisburg/Lancaster, Pennsylvania market, before moving to Omaha. He has since moved back to Pennsylvania and works remote.
- Todd Brandt. Hometown: Rugby, North Dakota. Attended Moorhead State College (now Minnesota State University, Moorhead) and Tempe Normal School (now Arizona State University). Brandt had radio stints in his hometown, starting on the air as a high school freshman. He has worked in Fargo, North Dakota, Phoenix, Arizona, Spokane, Washington, Portland, Oregon, Louisville, Kentucky, Harrisburg, Pennsylvania, and Omaha, Nebraska.
- Big Pussy (Producer). Hometown: Villisca, Iowa. As a child, he spent most of his childhood on a farm in Iowa, where he raised all sorts of livestock (primarily goats) and competed in 4H. He moved to Omaha, where he attended school at the University of Nebraska-Omaha.
- Nick Allen. Hometown: Omaha, Nebraska. Former comedian, entry level pharmacy tech and insurance agent became 'full time' on the show in January 2020. He was previously known as 'Midweek Nick Allen' coming on the show, 'Midweek.'

== Previous cast members ==
- Jeremy Campbell (Producer). Producer of the show until 2006.
- Donnie Dodge (Producer). Left in 2002 to become a firefighter.
- The Beastmaster (Producer). Producer in the mid 90s.
- Travis Justice (Sports). Former sportscaster and TV news anchor.
- Lisa Volenec (News Chick). Former KPTM anchor.
- Brian Huston (News Chick). Republican lawn care proprietor.
- Trisha Meuret (News Chick). Former KETV reporter.
- Craig Evans (News Guy). Former news guy and heart of the show in the mid 90s and from 2004 to 2022. Let go for budget reasons in June 2022.

== Recognition ==
- 106th face on the Barroom Floor - Omaha Press Club 2006, roasted at the induction by Larry the Cable Guy
- nominated for the 2006 Medium Market Personality of the Year NAB Marconi Radio Award.
- NBA Hall of Fame - Nebraska Broadcasters Association (2021)
