= KOBM-FM =

Oldies radio station in Blair, Nebraska

Partial simulcast of KIBM, Omaha
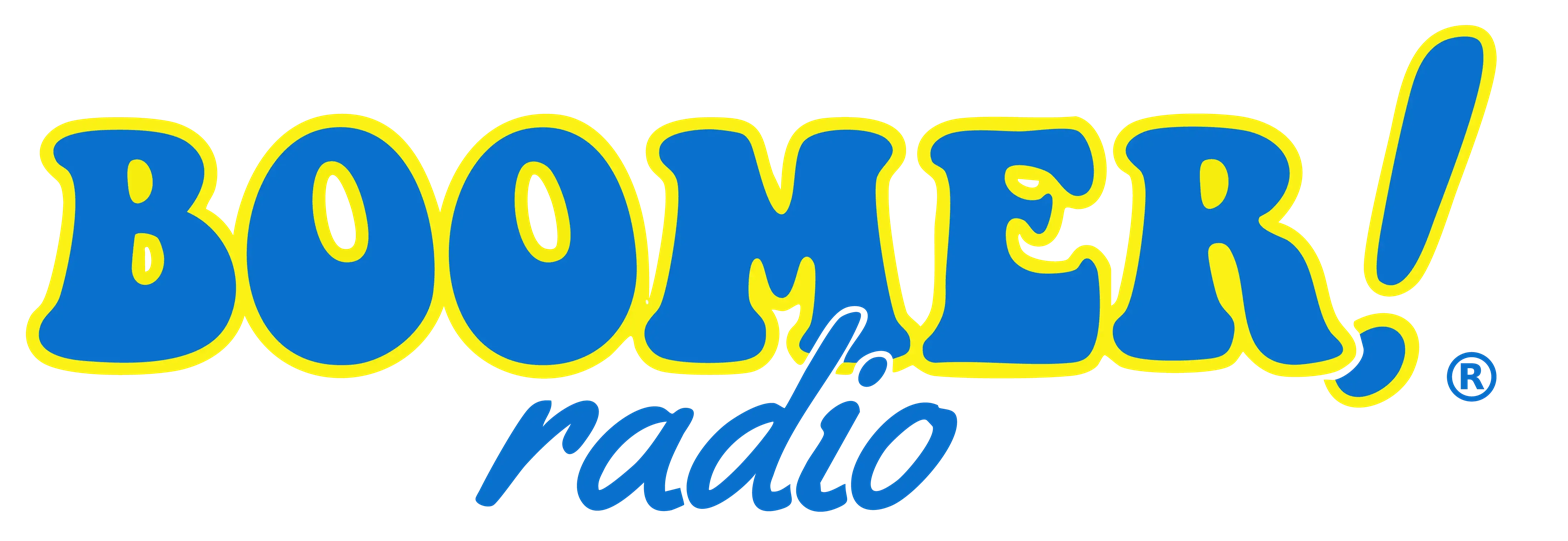
- Blair, Nebraska; United States
- Broadcast area: Fremont, Nebraska
- Frequency: 97.3 MHz
- Branding: Boomer Radio

Programming
- Format: Oldies
- Affiliations: Chicago Cubs; Omaha Beef

Ownership
- Owner: Steven W. Seline; (Walnut Radio, LLC)
- Sister stations: KCRO; KFMT-FM; KHUB; KIBM; KXCB; WOW

History
- First air date: September 10, 2001 (as KBLR-FM)
- Former call signs: KBLR-FM (2001–2018)
- Call sign meaning: "Omaha's Boomer"

Technical information
- Licensing authority: FCC
- Facility ID: 87840
- Class: C3
- ERP: 25,000 watts horiz; 24,500 watts vert
- HAAT: 92 meters (302 ft)
- Transmitter coordinates: 41°38′20.9″N 96°12′32″W

Links
- Public license information: Public file; LMS
- Webcast: Listen live
- Website: www.myboomerradio.com

KOBM-FM (97.3 MHz) is a radio station broadcasting an oldies format, partially simulcasting Omaha-based KIBM (1490 AM). Licensed to Blair, Nebraska, United States, the station serves the Blair and Fremont areas with fringe coverage to the northern Omaha metro area. The station is currently owned by Steven W. Seline, through licensee Walnut Radio, LLC. In addition to KIBM, sister stations to KOBM-FM are KHUB and KFMT-FM, both licensed to Fremont.

== History ==
The station signed on September 10, 2001, as KBLR-FM, carrying a satellite-fed adult contemporary format as "Blair Radio". The station was initially owned by Baer Radio, before being sold to Waitt Radio; the adult contemporary programming had previously aired on Waitt-owned KISP (101.5 FM), prior to that station's concurrent move from Blair to the Sioux City, Iowa, market. On December 31, 2002, at Noon, KBLR-FM began to target Omaha by flipping to urban contemporary as "Hot 107.7 & 97.3", and used a translator in Omaha at 107.7 FM (K299AK) to simulcast the station, as KBLR-FM is a rimshot signal from the north. Despite this arrangement, ratings for the station were very high. However, with the pending loss of K299AK due to a a new sign-on from Malvern, Iowa, on the same frequency, the format was moved to 106.9 FM on December 29, 2006, evolved to a rhythmic CHR, and rebranded as "Power 106.9". KBLR-FM/K299AK simulcasted the new frequency until February 1, 2007, when it reverted to targeting the northern rural areas of the Omaha market by flipping to country music as "Country 97.3". Waitt would later sell the station to Steven Seline's Walnut Radio. The station has since rebranded to "Real Country 97.3".

On December 6, 2018, KBLR-FM switched to a partial simulcast of oldies-formatted KOMJ (1490 AM) in Omaha, branded as "Boomer Radio". The call letters were changed to KOBM-FM on December 11, 2018.
