= KSPI (AM) =

- Stillwater, Oklahoma; United States
- Frequency: 780 kHz
- Branding: Pete 94.3

Programming
- Format: Adult hits - Mainstream rock

Ownership
- Owner: Stillwater Broadcasting, LLC
- Sister stations: KGFY, KSPI-FM, KVRO

History
- First air date: June 1, 1947; 79 years ago

Technical information
- Licensing authority: FCC
- Facility ID: 63441
- Class: D
- Power: 250 watts days only
- Transmitter coordinates: 36°4′56″N 97°3′13″W
- Translator: 94.3 K232FI (Stillwater)

Links
- Public license information: Public file; LMS
- Webcast: Listen Live
- Website: stillwaterradio.net/pete/pete-line-up

KSPI (780 AM "Pete 94.3") is a commercial radio station in Stillwater, Oklahoma. It airs an adult hits - mainstream rock radio format and is owned by Stillwater Broadcasting, LLC. In morning drive time, KSPI carries the syndicated Todd-n-Tyler Radio Empire show from KEZO-FM in Omaha.

By day, KSPI is powered at 250 watts. Because 780 AM is a clear channel frequency reserved for Class A WBBM Chicago, KSPI must leave the air at night to avoid interference. Programming is heard around the clock on FM translator 94.3 K232FI.

== History ==
KSPI signed on the air on June 1, 1947. In November, it added an FM station, KSPI-FM at 93.7 MHz.

On October 1, 2016, KSPI changed its format from sports radio to adult hits and mainstream rock, branded as "Pete 94.3".

== Translators ==
Call sign	Frequency	City of license	FID	ERP (W)	HAAT	Class	FCC info
K232FI	94.3 FM	Stillwater, Oklahoma	146422	250	24.4 m (80 ft)	D	LMS
