= 1916 United States Senate election in Nebraska =

- November 7, 1916
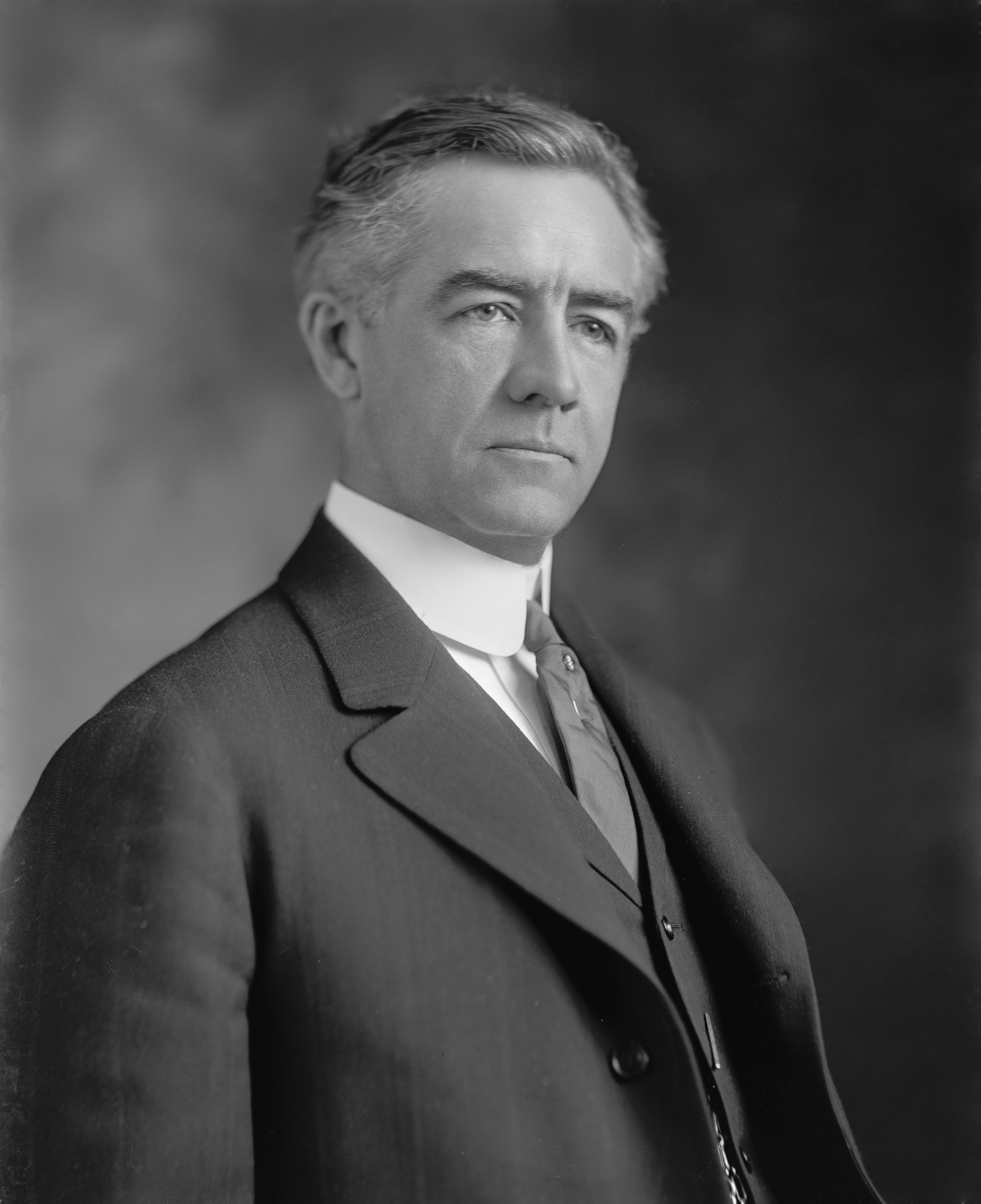

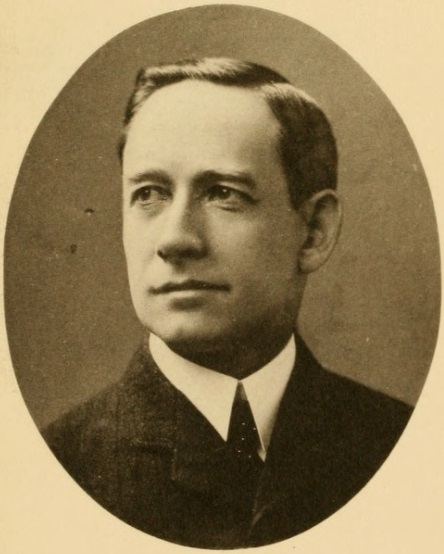
Nominee	Gilbert Hitchcock	John L. Kennedy
Party	Democratic	Republican
Popular vote	143,082	131,359
Percentage	49.98%	45.88%
- County results Hitchcock: 40–50% 50–60% 60–70% Kennedy: 40–50% 50–60% Tie: 40–50%
U.S. senator before election
Gilbert Hitchcock
Democratic
Elected U.S. Senator
Gilbert Hitchcock
Democratic

The 1916 United States Senate election in Nebraska took place on November 7, 1916. Incumbent Senator Gilbert Hitchcock, a Democrat, sought re-election in his first popular election. He won the Democratic primary and the cross-endorsement of the People's Independent party and faced former Congressman John L. Kennedy in the general election. Hitchcock won re-election as Democratic President Woodrow Wilson handily won the state in the presidential election.

== Democratic primary ==
=== Candidates ===
- Gilbert Hitchcock, incumbent Senator
- Ignatius J. Dunn, former Omaha City Attorney

=== Results ===
Democratic primary results
Party	Candidate	Votes	%
Democratic	Gilbert M. Hitchcock (inc.)	50,852	66.09%
Democratic	Ignatius J. Dunn	26,090	33.91%
Democratic	Write-ins	7	0.01%
Total votes		76,949	100.00%

== Republican primary ==
=== Candidates ===
- John L. Kennedy, former U.S. Representative from Nebraska's 2nd congressional district
- Chester Hardy Aldrich, former Governor of Nebraska

=== Results ===
Republican primary results
Party	Candidate	Votes	%
Republican	John L. Kennedy	47,445	53.60%
Republican	Chester H. Aldrich	41,077	46.40%
Total votes		88,522	100.00%

== Progressive primary ==
=== Candidates ===
- Walter O. Henry

=== Results ===
Progressive primary results
Party	Candidate	Votes	%
Progressive	Walter O. Henry	242	100.00%
Total votes		242	100.00%

On July 21, 1916, the Progressive Party withdrew its nominations and endorsed the slate of Republican candidates.

== Socialist primary ==
=== Candidates ===
- E. E. Olmstead

=== Results ===
Socialist primary results
Party	Candidate	Votes	%
Socialist	E. E. Olmstead	124	99.20%
Socialist	Write-ins	1	0.80%
Total votes		125	100.00%

== Prohibition primary ==
=== Candidates ===
- D. B. Gilbert

=== Results ===
Prohibition primary results
Party	Candidate	Votes	%
Prohibition	D. B. Gilbert	15	71.43%
Prohibition	Write-ins	6	28.57%
Total votes		21	100.00%

== People's Independent primary ==
=== Candidates ===
- Gilbert Hitchcock, incumbent Senator

=== Results ===
People's Independent primary results
Party	Candidate	Votes	%
Populist	Gilbert M. Hitchcock (inc.)	160	87.91%
Populist	Write-ins	22	12.09%
Total votes		182	100.00%

== General election ==
1916 United States Senate election in Nebraska
Party	Candidate	Votes	%
Democratic	Gilbert M. Hitchcock (inc.)	143,082	49.98%
Republican	John L. Kennedy	131,359	45.88%
Socialist	E. E. Olmstead	7,425	2.59%
Prohibition	D. G. Gilbert	4,429	1.55%
Total votes		286,295	100.00%
Democratic hold			
