= The Record Herald =

Newspaper in Waynesboro, Pennsylvania, US

- Type: Daily newspaper
- Format: Broadsheet
- Owner: USA Today Co.
- Editor: Randy Parker
- Founded: July 2, 1894, as Blue Ridge Zephyr
- Headquarters: 30 Walnut Street, Waynesboro, Pennsylvania 17268, United States
- OCLC number: 13048395
- Website: TheRecordHerald.com

The Record Herald is an American daily newspaper published in Waynesboro, Pennsylvania. It was established as Blue Ridge Zephyr when it started publishing on July 2, 1894. It is presently owned by USA Today Co.

In addition to the borough of Waynesboro, The Record Herald covers several communities in Franklin County, Pennsylvania, including Antrim Township, Blue Ridge Summit, Greencastle, Mont Alto and Washington Township. It also circulates across the state line in Cascade, Maryland, and environs.

== Echo Pilot ==
The Record Herald has a satellite bureau in Greencastle and also produces a weekly newspaper, the Echo Pilot, serving that borough.

== Notable staff ==
- Ed Koterba, reporter, columnist, and feature writer from 1946 until 1952
