= 1930 United States Senate election in Nebraska =

- November 4, 1930
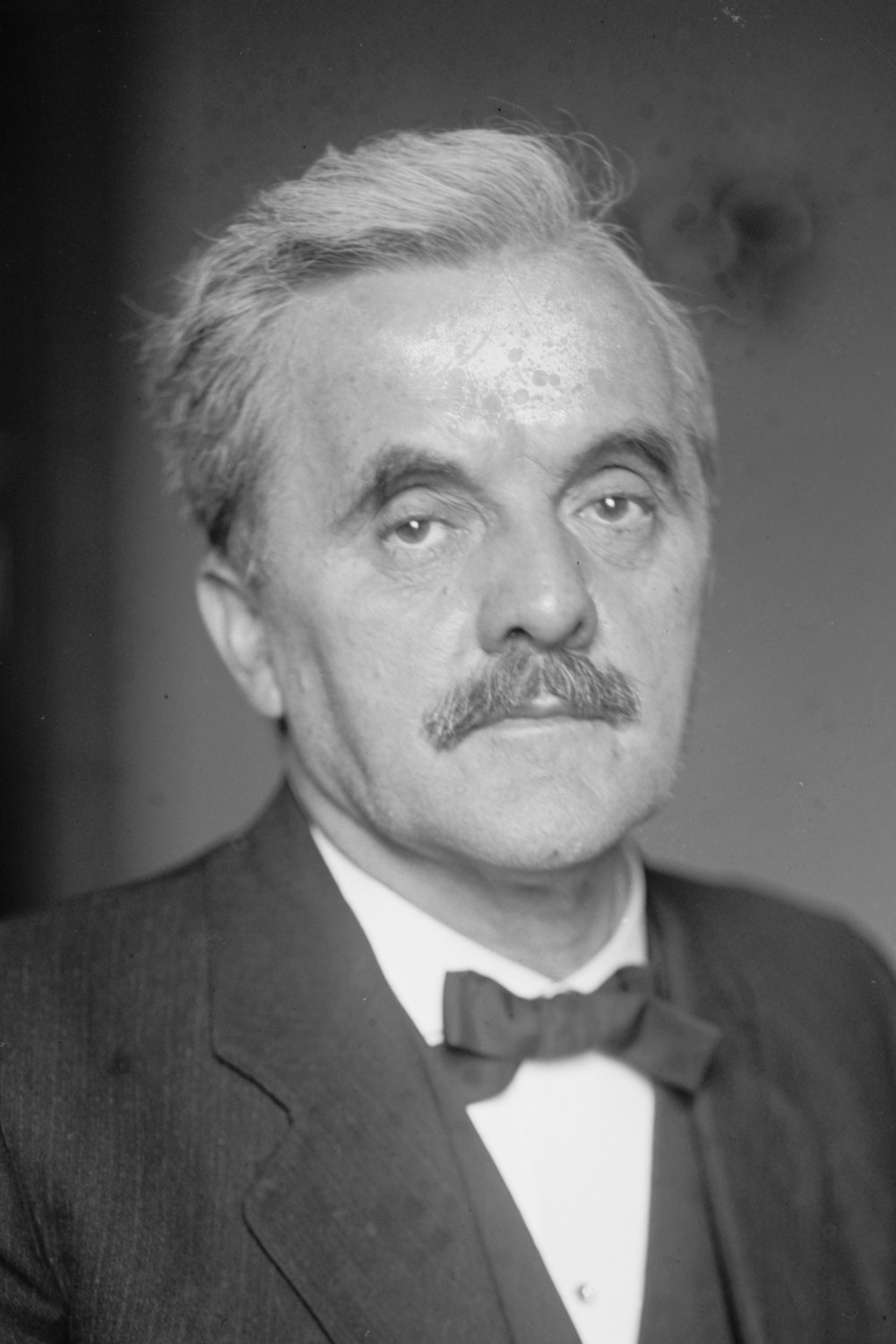

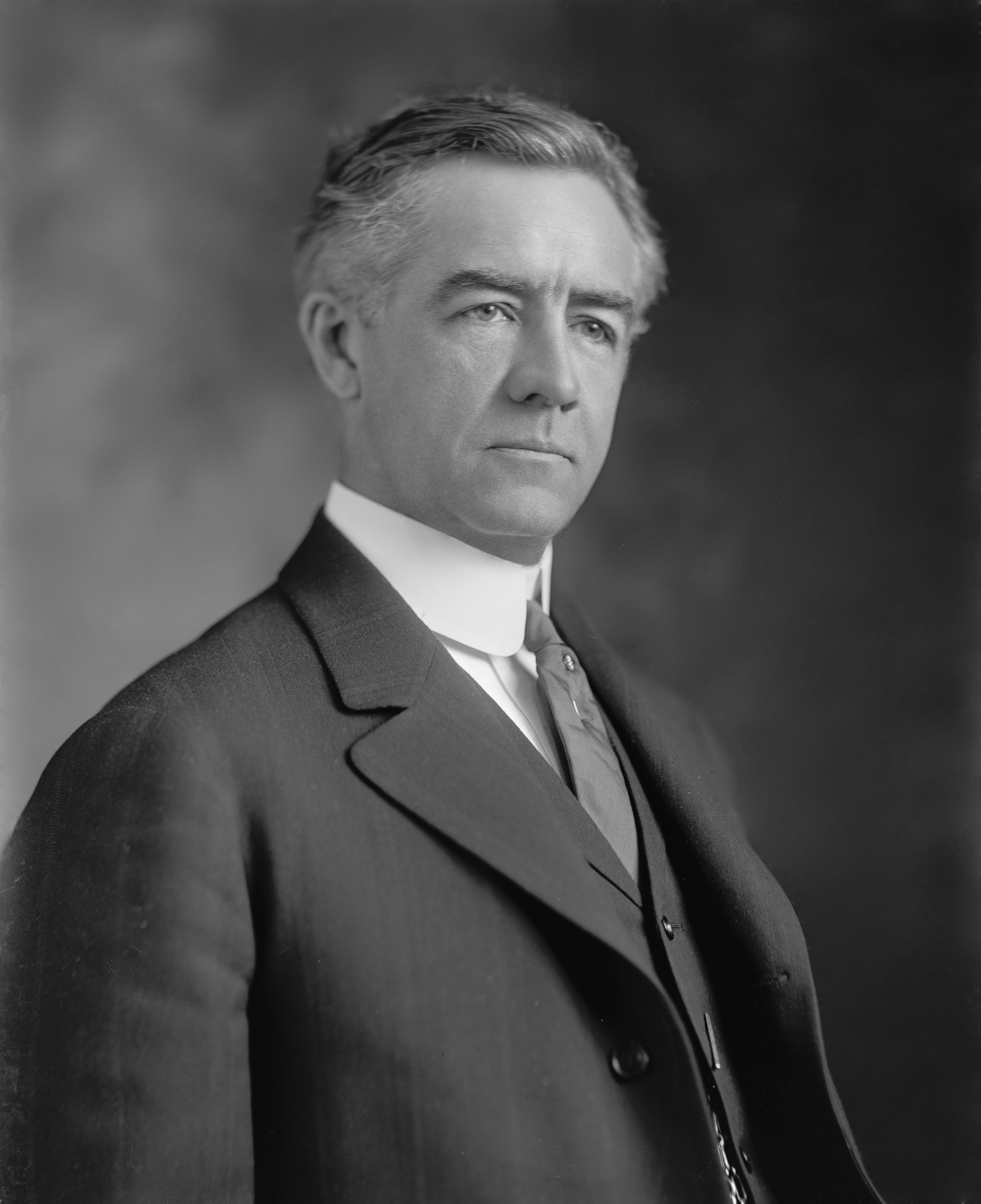
Nominee	George W. Norris	Gilbert Hitchcock
Party	Republican	Democratic
Popular vote	247,118	172,795
Percentage	56.84%	39.74%
- County results Norris: 40–50% 50–60% 60–70% 70–80% Hitchcock: 50–60%
U.S. senator before election
George W. Norris
Republican
Elected U.S. Senator
George W. Norris
Republican

The 1930 United States Senate election in Nebraska took place on November 4, 1930. Incumbent Republican Senator George W. Norris ran for re-election to a fourth term. He was challenged by former Senator Gilbert Hitchcock, the Democratic nominee, whom he handily defeated.

== Republican primary ==
=== Candidates ===
- George W. Norris, incumbent Senator
- W. M. Stebbins, Nebraska State Treasurer
- Aaron C. Read, attorney

=== Results ===
Republican primary results
Party	Candidate	Votes	%
Republican	George W. Norris (inc.)	108,471	57.26%
Republican	W. M. Stebbins	74,486	39.32%
Republican	Aaron C. Read	6,458	3.41%
Republican	Scattering	5	0.00%
Total votes		189,420	100.00%

== Democratic primary ==
=== Candidates ===
- Gilbert Hitchcock, former U.S. Senator
- Jennie Mather Callfas, physician

=== Results ===
Democratic primary results
Party	Candidate	Votes	%
Democratic	Gilbert Hitchcock	60,346	78.51%
Democratic	Jennie Mather Callras	16,417	21.36%
Democratic	Scattering	105	0.14%
Total votes		147,486	100.00%

== General election ==
=== Candidates ===
- George W. Norris, incumbent Senator (Republican)
- Gilbert Hitchcock, former U.S. Senator (Democratic)
- Beatrice Fenton Craig (Independent)

Beatrice Fenton Craig, a retired schoolteacher, initially filed to run in the Republican primary against Norris, but withdrew in favor of W. M. Stebbins. However, after Stebbins lost the primary to Norris, Craig re-entered the race as an independent candidate.

=== Results ===
1930 United States Senate election in Nebraska
Party	Candidate	Votes	%	±%
Republican	George W. Norris (inc.)	247,118	56.84%	−5.72%
Democratic	Gilbert Hitchcock	172,795	39.74%	+2.30%
Independent	Beatrice Fenton Craig	14,884	3.42%	—
Write-in		7	0.00%	—
Majority		74,323	17.10%	−8.02%
Total votes		434,804	100.00%	
Republican hold				
