= KGFY =

- Stillwater, Oklahoma; United States
- Frequency: 105.5 MHz
- Branding: Cowboy Country

Programming
- Format: Country music

Ownership
- Owner: Stillwater Broadcasting, LLC
- Sister stations: KSPI-FM, KSPI, KVRO

Technical information
- Licensing authority: FCC
- Facility ID: 22267
- Class: A
- ERP: 4,200 watts
- HAAT: 119.8 meters (393 ft)
- Transmitter coordinates: 36.17972°N 97.01056°W

Links
- Public license information: Public file; LMS
- Webcast: Listen live
- Website: stillwaterradio.net/kgfy-fm/kgfy-fm-line-up

KGFY is a radio station airing a country music format licensed to Stillwater, Oklahoma, broadcasting on 105.5 FM. The station is owned by Stillwater Broadcasting, LLC.
