= Gilbert Hitchcock =

American politician (1859–1934)

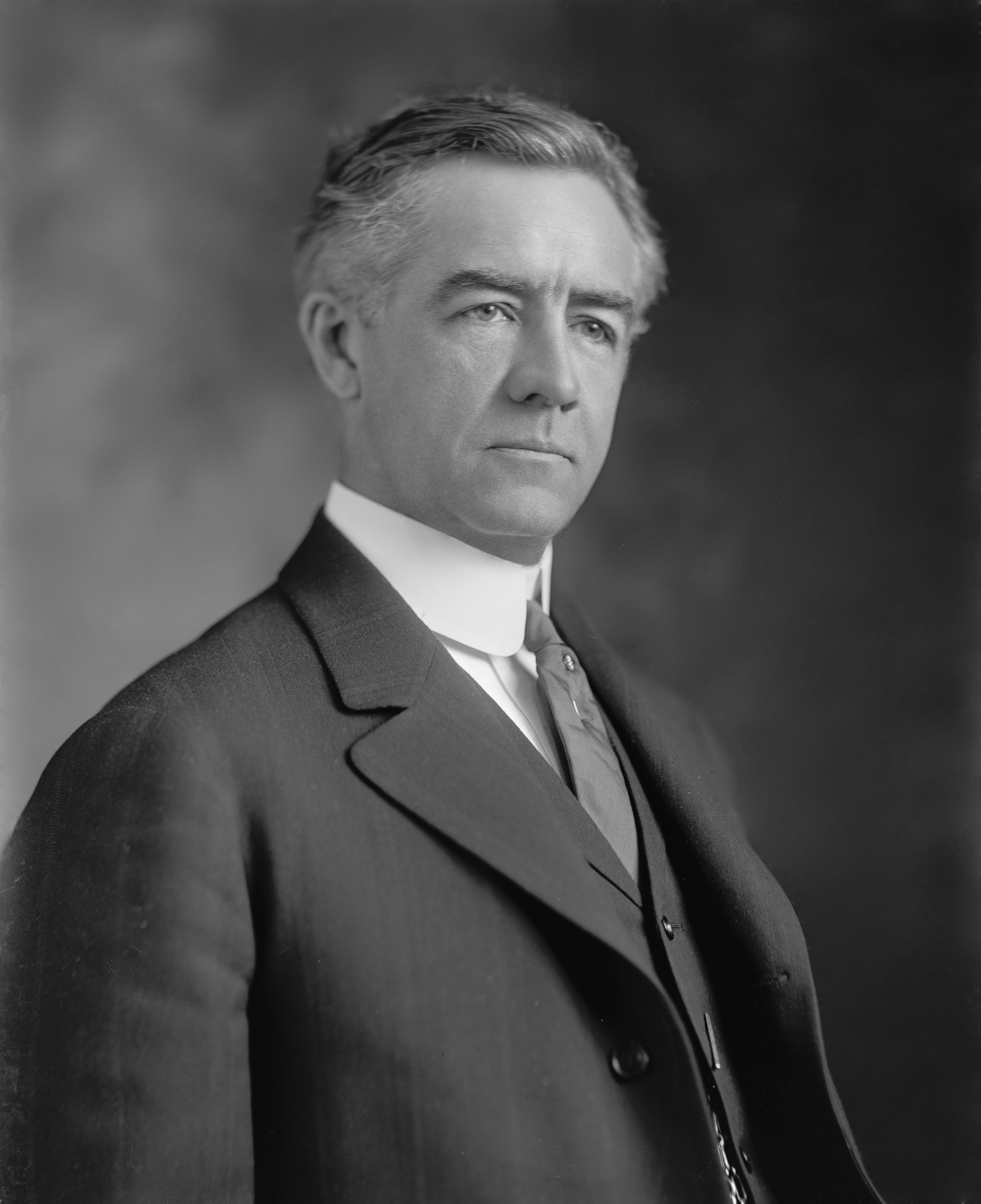
- Hitchcock, 1905–1934

Acting Chairman of the Senate Democratic Caucus
- In office November 12, 1919 – April 27, 1920
- Deputy: Peter G. Gerry
- Preceded by: Thomas S. Martin
- Succeeded by: Oscar Underwood (Senate Democratic Leader)

United States Senator from Nebraska
- In office March 4, 1911 – March 3, 1923
- Preceded by: Elmer Burkett
- Succeeded by: Robert B. Howell

Member of the U.S. House of Representatives from Nebraska's 2nd district
- In office March 4, 1907 – March 3, 1911
- Preceded by: John L. Kennedy
- Succeeded by: Charles O. Lobeck
- In office March 4, 1903 – March 3, 1905
- Preceded by: David Henry Mercer
- Succeeded by: John L. Kennedy

Personal details
- Born: Gilbert Monell Hitchcock; September 18, 1859 Omaha, Nebraska, U.S.
- Died: February 3, 1934 (aged 74) Washington, D.C., U.S.
- Resting place: Forest Lawn Memorial Park
- Party: Democratic
- Spouses: Jessie Crounse (m. 1883; died 1925) Martha Harris (m. 1927)
- Relatives: Lorenzo Crounse (Father-in-law)
- Education: University of Michigan, Ann Arbor (LLB)
- Gilbert Hitchcock's voice Gilbert Hitchcock speaks about World War I and his support for the creation of the League of Nations (recorded c. 1920)

Gilbert Monell Hitchcock (September 18, 1859 – February 3, 1934) was an American U.S. representative and senator from Nebraska, and the founder of the Omaha World-Herald newspaper.

== Life and career ==
Born in Omaha, Nebraska, Hitchcock was the son of U.S. Senator Phineas Warren Hitchcock of Nebraska. He attended the public schools of Omaha and the gymnasium at Baden-Baden, Germany. He graduated in 1881 from the law department of the University of Michigan at Ann Arbor, where he was admitted to the Zeta Psi fraternity; he was then admitted to the bar and commenced practice in Omaha in 1882. He continued the practice of law until 1885, when he established and edited the Omaha Evening World; four years later, he purchased the Nebraska Morning Herald and consolidated the two into the morning and evening editions of the Omaha World-Herald.

On August 30, 1883, he married Jessie Crounse, the daughter of Nebraska Supreme Court justice and future governor Lorenzo Crounse.

His first wife died on May 8, 1925, and on June 1, 1927, he married Martha Harris, of Memphis, TN.

His family had traditionally been Republicans, but Gilbert broke tradition and became a Democrat in response to agricultural issues and the leadership of fellow Nebraskan William Jennings Bryan.

Hitchcock was an unsuccessful Democratic candidate for the United States House of Representatives in 1898. Four years later, he ran again, and this time was successful, serving from 1903 to 1905. He lost reelection after one term in 1904, but returned to Congress in 1906, serving two more terms from 1907 to 1911.

Hitchcock did not seek reelection to the House in 1910, instead choosing to run for the United States Senate. He was elected to the Senate by the legislature on January 18, 1911. His election made him the first Democrat to ever be elected or serve as a Senator from Nebraska. He was reelected in 1916, making him the first person popularly-elected to the Senate from Nebraska after the ratification of the Seventeenth Amendment. During his two terms, he was the chairman of the Committee on the Philippines from 1913 to 1918, the Committee on Foreign Relations from 1918 to 1919, and the Committee on Forest Reservations and Game Protection from 1919 to 1921. As Chairman of the Foreign Relations Committee, he was a leading advocate of the League of Nations and the Treaty of Versailles.

Hitchcock lost his bid for a third Senate term to Republican Robert B. Howell in 1922. After the end of his Senate service, he resumed newspaper work in Omaha. In 1930, he ran to return to the Senate, but was soundly defeated by incumbent Republican George W. Norris. Hitchcock retired from active business in 1933 and moved to Washington, D.C., where he died on February 3, 1934. He was interred in Forest Lawn Memorial Park in Omaha. Gilbert M. Hitchcock Elementary School and Hitchcock Park in Omaha were named in his honor.

The newspaper was then led by his son-in-law Henry Doorly, husband of Hitchcock's daughter Margaret.

Collections of Senator Hitchcock's papers are housed at the Library of Congress and Nebraska State Historical Society.

In 1984 Hitchcock was inducted into the Nebraska Hall of Fame.

== See also ==
- Hitchcock Park
- Omaha World Herald
- Henry Doorly

U.S. House of Representatives
Preceded by David Henry Mercer	Member of the U.S. House of Representatives from Nebraska's 2nd congressional district 1903–1905	Succeeded by John L. Kennedy
Preceded by John L. Kennedy	Member of the U.S. House of Representatives from Nebraska's 2nd congressional district 1907–1911	Succeeded by Charles O. Lobeck
U.S. Senate
Preceded by Elmer Burkett	U.S. Senator (Class 1) from Nebraska; 1911–1923; Served alongside: Norris Brown, George W. Norris	Succeeded by Robert B. Howell
Preceded by Simon Guggenheim	Chair of the Senate Philippines Committee; 1913–1918	Succeeded by John F. Shafroth
Preceded by William J. Stone	Chair of the Senate Foreign Relations Committee; 1918–1919	Succeeded by Henry Cabot Lodge
Preceded by George P. McLean	Chair of the Senate Forest Reservations Committee; 1919–1921	Position abolished
Party political offices
First	Democratic nominee for U.S. Senator from Nebraska (Class 1); 1916, 1922	Succeeded by Richard Lee Metcalfe
Preceded by Thomas S. Martin	Chair of the Senate Democratic Caucus (Acting); 1919–1920	Succeeded by Oscar Underwood as Senate Democratic Leader
Preceded by J. J. Thomas	Democratic nominee for U.S. Senator (Class 2) from Nebraska; 1930	Succeeded by Terry Carpenter
