= KKCD =

- Omaha, Nebraska; United States
- Broadcast area: Omaha, Nebraska
- Frequency: 105.9 MHz (HD Radio)
- Branding: Classic Rock 105.9

Programming
- Format: Classic rock

Ownership
- Owner: SummitMedia; (SM-KKCD, LLC)
- Sister stations: KEZO-FM, KQCH, KSRZ, KXSP

History
- First air date: August 11, 1990 (as KKVU)
- Former call signs: KUKF (1990–1990); KKVU (1990–1991)

Technical information
- Licensing authority: FCC
- Facility ID: 74103
- Class: C2
- ERP: 50,000 watts
- HAAT: 146 meters
- Transmitter coordinates: 41°12′4″N 95°57′12″W

Links
- Public license information: Public file; LMS
- Webcast: Listen live
- Website: classicrock1059.fm

KKCD (105.9 FM) is a radio station broadcasting a classic rock format. Licensed to Omaha, Nebraska, United States, the station serves the Omaha area. The station is owned by SummitMedia. KKCD's studios are located on Mercy Road in Omaha's Aksarben Village, while its transmitter is located near South 27th Street and Q Street (near the Kennedy Freeway), about three miles south of Downtown Omaha.

== History ==
=== Smooth jazz (1990–1991) ===
The station went on the air on August 11, 1990, calling itself "The View" and broadcasting a smooth jazz format. It had earlier sought the calls KUKF, but changed to KKVU a month before signing on.

=== Classic rock (1991–present) ===
The station initially met acceptance, but soon struggled in the ratings, and on November 9, 1991, the station flipped formats to classic rock as "CD 105.9", and changed their call sign to KKCD. Notable radio personalities include Donna Mason, Otis XII and Steve King, who was the longest running morning show host in the station's history before he was let go on February 1, 2019.

Journal Communications and the E. W. Scripps Company announced on July 30, 2014 that the two companies would merge to create a new broadcast company under the E.W. Scripps Company name that owned the two companies' broadcast properties, including KKCD. The transaction was completed in 2015. Scripps exited radio in 2018; the Omaha stations went to SummitMedia in a four-market, $47 million deal completed on November 1, 2018.

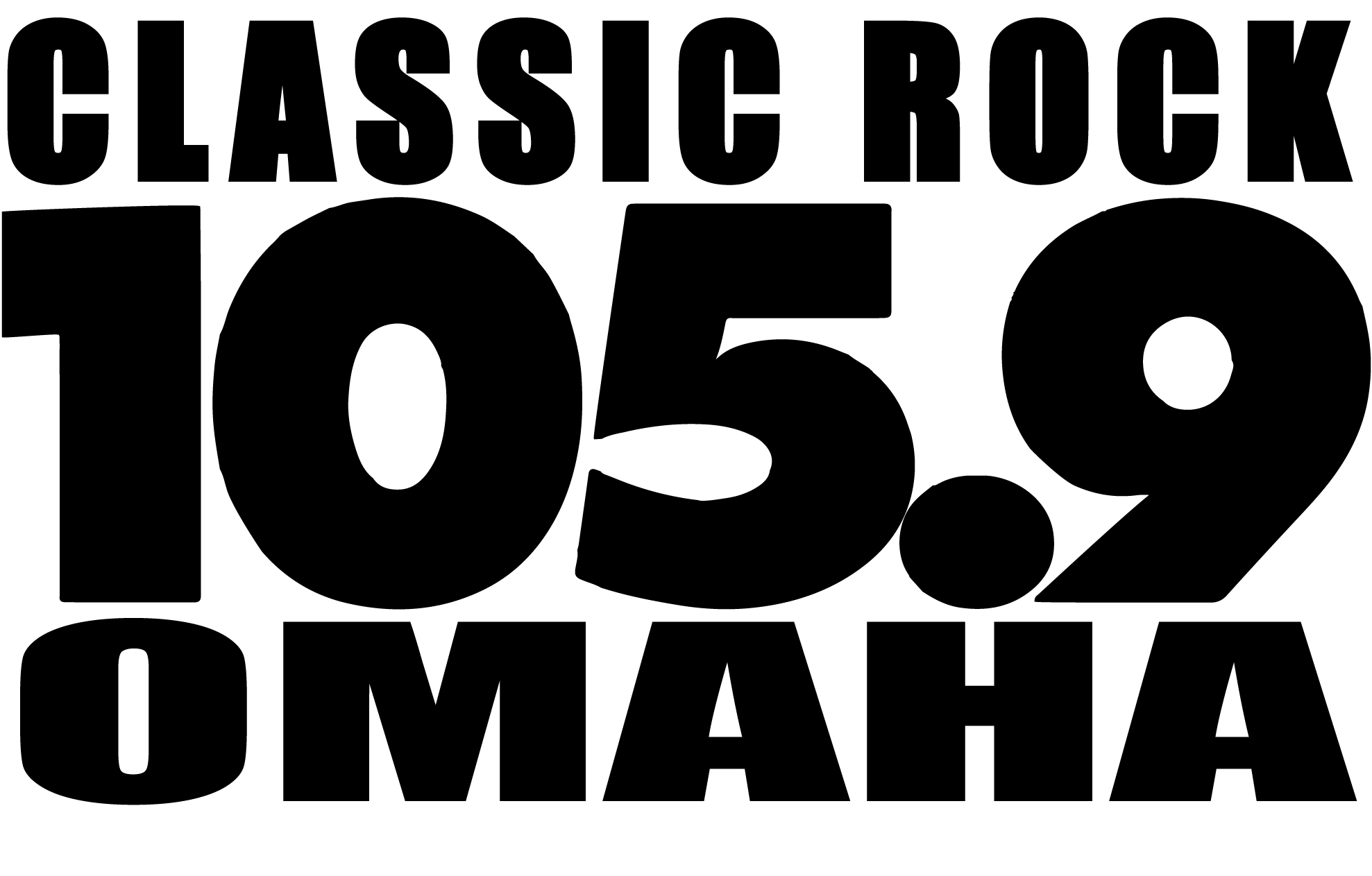
Previous logo

In February 2020, KKCD rebranded as simply "Classic Rock 105.9".
