= KCRO =

Radio station in Nebraska, US

- Omaha, Nebraska; United States
- Frequency: 660 kHz
- Branding: 660 AM KCRO

Programming
- Format: Christian radio
- Affiliations: Salem Radio Network

Ownership
- Owner: Steve Seline; (Hickory Radio, LLC)
- Sister stations: KFMT-FM; KHUB; KIBM; KOBM-FM; KXCB; WOW

History
- First air date: April 19, 1922
- Former call signs: WAAW (1922–1939); KOWH (1939–1960, 1971–1979); KMEO (1960–1968); KOZN (1968–1971)
- Call sign meaning: "Christian Radio Omaha"

Technical information
- Licensing authority: FCC
- Facility ID: 54902
- Class: D
- Power: 1,000 watts (day); 54 watts (night)
- Transmitter coordinates: 41°18′47″N 96°0′36″W

Links
- Public license information: Public file; LMS
- Webcast: Listen live
- Website: kcro.com

KCRO (660 AM) is a commercial radio station in Omaha, Nebraska. KCRO is owned by Hickory Radio and airs a Christian format. The studios are located on Burt Street (near North 120th Street and Dodge Road in West Omaha), while the transmitter site is located behind Roncalli Catholic High School near Sorensen Parkway in Northwest Omaha. Founded in 1922, it is Nebraska's oldest radio station.

KCRO operates with 1,000 watts power during daytime hours. Because AM 660 is a clear channel frequency (reserved for 50,000-watt Class A station WFAN in New York City), KCRO must greatly reduce power to 54 watts at night to avoid interference. It uses a non-directional antenna at all times.

Programming was additionally heard on 60-watt FM translator station K293CJ at 106.5 MHz. The translator has since been moved to Lincoln, and changed frequencies to 106.7 FM.

== Programming ==
KCRO airs national religious leaders such as Jim Daly, Chuck Swindoll and David Jeremiah as well as local preachers. On weekends, KCRO airs southern gospel music. KCRO is a brokered time radio station, where hosts pay Hickory Radio for 15 to 30-minute blocks of time, and may use their shows to seek donations to their ministries. Most hours begin with world and national news from Salem Radio Network.

== History ==
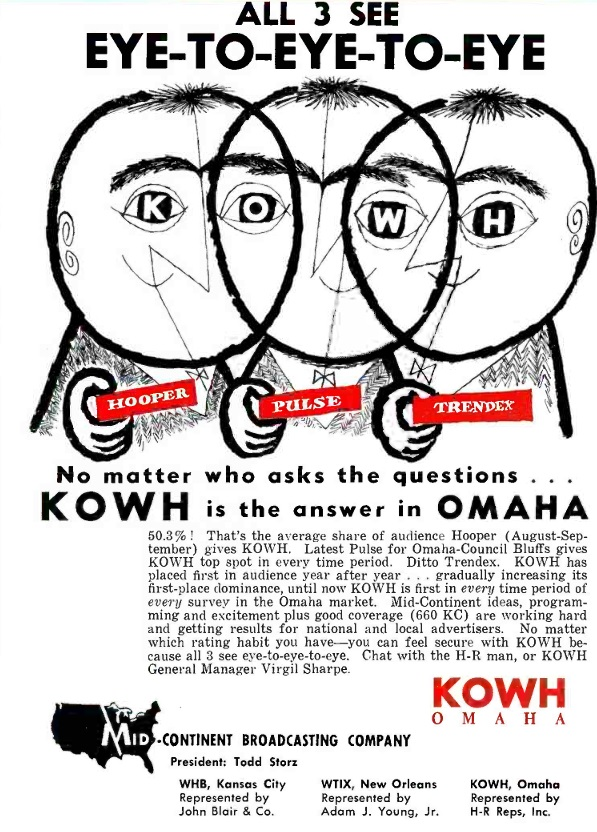
1955 station advertisement

The station was first licensed, as WAAW, on April 19, 1922, and debuted the same day, making it among the first radio stations in Nebraska, and the oldest surviving one. The call letters were randomly assigned from a sequential roster of available call signs. Also, until the January 1923 adoption of the Mississippi River as the dividing line, radio stations in Nebraska received call letters starting with "W" rather than "K". The station broadcast agricultural reports and crop prices.

On November 11, 1928, as part of a major allocation implemented by the Federal Radio Commission's General Order 40, WAAW was assigned to 660 kHz, restricted to daytime-only operation.

In 1939, the station call letters were changed to KOWH. In 1946, KOWH put one of the first FM stations on the air in Omaha, KOAD (later KTGL).

By the 1950s, the owner was Mid Continent Broadcasting. In an advertisement in the 1950 edition of Broadcasting Yearbook, KOWH stated it was "The Toast of The Midwest". It claimed a broadcast area of 215 miles (350 km) in diameter, and offered advertisers "more coverage". It touted 660 AM as a "clear channel frequency", neglecting to note that a New York City station was the frequency's dominant station, thus KOWH had to sign off at night.

KOWH played an important role in U.S. radio programming history. In May 1952, the station became what is considered the first Top 40 station. It was owned and operated by radio pioneer Todd Storz, who crafted a radio format that played the top hits every couple of hours, using high-energy disc jockeys, aimed at young listeners. KOWH's success encouraged the spread of Top 40 stations across the country.

As contemporary music listening switched to the FM band, KOWH carried a country music format, and later an urban adult contemporary format. On the first day of 1960, the station's call sign was changed to KMEO, which was switched to KOZN in 1968, then back to KOWH in 1971. In April 1979, KOWH became a Christian radio station, and changed its call sign to KCRO in August of that year.

In 2005, the station was bought for $3.1 million by the Salem Media Group.

In July 2018, Hickory Radio agreed to purchase KCRO, co-owned talk radio station KOTK, and two translators from Salem Media. The purchase was consummated on October 31, 2018, at a price of $1.375 million.

== See also ==
- List of initial AM-band station grants in the United States
