= KVRO =

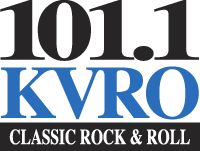
- Stillwater, Oklahoma; United States
- Broadcast area: Stillwater, Oklahoma
- Frequency: 101.1 MHz
- Branding: 101.1 KVRO

Programming
- Format: Classic hits

Ownership
- Owner: Stillwater Broadcasting, LLC
- Sister stations: KSPI-FM, KSPI, KGFY

History
- First air date: April 12, 1997 (as KXPX on 98.1)
- Former call signs: KXPX (1994–1998)
- Former frequencies: 98.1 MHz (1997–2008)

Technical information
- Licensing authority: FCC
- Facility ID: 51822
- Class: A
- ERP: 6,000 watts
- HAAT: 100 meters (330 ft)
- Transmitter coordinates: 36°13′6″N 97°9′43″W

Links
- Public license information: Public file; LMS
- Webcast: Listen Live
- Website: stillwaterradio.net

KVRO (101.1 FM) is a radio station broadcasting a classic hits music format. Licensed to Stillwater, Oklahoma, United States. The station is currently owned by Stillwater Broadcasting, LLC. It is the home for Stillwater Oklahoma high schools sports broadcasts. The call sign KVRO was the originally used for the Oklahoma State campus radio station that operated at 105.5 MHz in the 60s, 70s, and 80s and is now KGFY 105.5, a sister station. The current KVRO signed on in 1998.
