= John L. Kennedy =

American politician

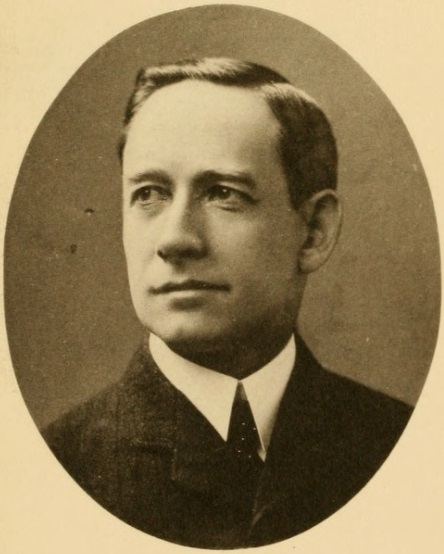
- From Nebraskans, 1854-1904

Member of the U.S. House of Representatives from Nebraska's 2nd district
- In office March 4, 1905 – March 3, 1907
- Preceded by: Gilbert Hitchcock
- Succeeded by: Gilbert Hitchcock

Personal details
- Born: October 27, 1854 Ayrshire, Scotland
- Died: August 30, 1946 (aged 91) Pacific Palisades, Los Angeles, California
- Party: Republican

John Lauderdale Kennedy (October 27, 1854 – August 30, 1946) was an American Republican Party politician.

Born in Ayrshire, Scotland on October 27, 1854, he immigrated in 1874 to the United States and settled and farmed in LaSalle County, Illinois. He attended Knox College in Galesburg, Illinois in 1879 and then graduated from the law department of the University of Iowa in Iowa City in 1882. He passed the bar and briefly set up practice in Omaha, Nebraska being elected as a Republican to the Fifty-ninth United States Congress. He served from March 4, 1905, to March 3, 1907, unsuccessfully running for reelection in 1906.

He resumed practicing law in Omaha and became a member and chairman pro tempore of the board of fire and police commissioners for the city of Omaha in 1907 and 1908. He was the chairman of the Republican State committee in 1911 and 1912. He ran unsuccessfully for election to the United States Senate from Nebraska in 1916.

He was the Federal fuel administrator for Nebraska from October 1917 to March 1919. He was also the president of the United States National Bank from 1920 to 1925 and president of the Omaha Chamber of Commerce in 1924 and 1925. He retired in January 1933 and moved to Pacific Palisades, California, where he died August 30, 1946. He was buried in Forest Lawn Cemetery in Glendale, California.

Party political offices
| First | Republican nominee for U.S. Senator from Nebraska (Class 1); 1916 | Succeeded by Robert B. Howell |
U.S. House of Representatives
| Preceded by Gilbert Hitchcock (D) | Member of the U.S. House of Representatives from Nebraska's 2nd congressional district March 4, 1905 – March 3, 1907 | Succeeded by Gilbert Hitchcock (D) |
