= KXCB =

Mostly simulcasts KIBM Omaha
- Omaha, Nebraska; United States
- Broadcast area: Omaha-Council Bluffs metropolitan area
- Frequency: 1420 kHz
- Branding: Boomer In The Bluffs

Programming
- Format: Oldies

Ownership
- Owner: Steven W. Seline; (Hickory Radio, LLC)
- Sister stations: KCRO; KFMT-FM; KHUB; KIBM; KOBM-FM; WOW

History
- First air date: March 20, 1957
- Former call signs: KOOO (1957–1979); KESY (1979–1980); KOOO (1980–1984); KROM (1984–1986); KESY (1986–1990); KLAO (1990); KESY (1990–1995); KBBX (1995–2002); KHLP (2002–2005); KOTK (2005–2019); KOBM (2019–2022)
- Call sign meaning: Council Bluffs

Technical information
- Licensing authority: FCC
- Facility ID: 50307
- Class: B
- Power: 1,000 watts (day); 330 watts (night)
- Transmitter coordinates: 41°11′59″N 95°54′35″W
- Translator: 106.5 K293CX (Council Bluffs, Iowa)

Links
- Public license information: Public file; LMS
- Webcast: Listen live
- Website: www.boomerinthebluffs.com

KXCB (1420 AM) is a commercial radio station licensed to Omaha, Nebraska, United States, serving the Omaha–Council Bluffs metropolitan area. It features an oldies format, owned by Steven Seline, through licensee Hickory Radio, LLC. The studios and offices are on Burt Street near North 120th Street and Dodge Road in West Omaha.

The transmitter is in Council Bluffs, off South 36th Street, near the Missouri River. Programming is also heard on 250-watt FM translator K293CX at 106.5 MHz in Council Bluffs. KXCB mostly serves as a simulcast of KIBM (1490 AM) and the "Boomer Radio" network, but breaks away from the network for news, features, and sports aimed at the Council Bluffs side of the market.

== History ==
=== Early years ===
The station signed on the air on March 20, 1957. The original call sign was KOOO and it was a daytimer, broadcasting at 500 watts but required to go off the air at night. It aired a country music format. It later began simulcasting with 104.5 FM, which went on the air on May 12, 1972, as KOOO-FM.

By 1978, KOOO had changed to a news/talk format, with 104.5 FM moving to easy listening music. In March 1979, 1420 AM flipped to an easy listening format and was renamed KESY, again simulcasting with 104.5, which had the KESY-FM call letters.

In 1980, the AM reverted to the old KOOO call sign and adopted an adult standards format, using the ”Music of Your Life” service. In 1984, the call sign changed to KROM. In late 1985, the AM once again became KESY with an easy listening format, and resumed simulcasting with the FM. By late 1989, KESY AM and FM shifted to soft adult contemporary.

For a brief two-week period in June 1990, the calls became KLAO before reverting to KESY. On January 1, 1995, the station changed its call sign to KBBX, and flipped to an urban oldies format.

=== Journal Communications and Salem Media ===
Journal Communications purchased KBBX in January 1998, and changed the programming to Regional Mexican music in April of that year. On May 10, 2002, as part of a major format shuffle, the format moved to then-sister station 97.7 FM. After two weeks of simulcasting, the AM station became KHLP with an advice talk format.

In April 2005, it was announced that Journal had sold KHLP to Salem Communications, and in December of that year, the station switched to conservative talk as "Newstalk 1420 KOTK". On September 4, 2008, KOTK flipped to a Spanish Christian radio format with the slogan "La Luz" (The Light).

On April 4, 2016, KOTK switched back to conservative talk, branded as "94.5/1420 The Answer".

=== Hickory Radio ===
In July 2018, Hickory Radio purchased the station from Salem Media Group.

On March 31, 2019, KOTK flipped to a simulcast of co-owned KOBM (1490 AM), airing an oldies format branded as "Boomer Radio". The following day, KOTK changed call letters to KOBM, with 1490 AM adopting the KIBM call letters.

On December 20, 2022, the station changed its call sign to KXCB. On February 1, 2023, KXCB dropped the KIBM simulcast and became a country music station aimed at Council Bluffs, Iowa, branded as "Bluffs Country 106.5".

On June 1, 2026, citing stiff competition from the two Omaha country stations, KXCB flipped back to the "Boomer Radio" oldies format. While most programming again originates from "Boomer" flagship KIBM, "Boomer In The Bluffs" retained KXCB's Council Bluffs-oriented elements, including six daily newscasts, a "Belonging in the Bluffs" feature, a weekly interview with the mayor of Council Bluffs, and Iowa Hawkeyes football.
