= Henry Doorly =

Barbadian-American editor and publisher

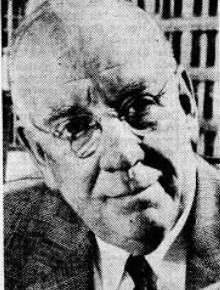
- Doorly in 1945
- Born: November 9, 1879; Barbados
- Died: June 21, 1961 (aged 81); Omaha, Nebraska, US
- Resting place: Forest Lawn Memorial Park, Omaha, Nebraska, US
- Education: Harrison College
- Occupations: Editor, Publisher; Omaha World-Herald
- Spouse: Margaret Hitchcock Doorly (1884–1964)

Henry Doorly (November 9, 1879 – June 21, 1961) was the chairman of the World Publishing Company and publisher of the Omaha World-Herald in Nebraska, founded by his father-in-law, U.S. Senator Gilbert Hitchcock. Doorly worked for the company for 58 years, and became a highly influential figure in the city. Shortly after his death, Omaha's zoo was renamed in his memory in 1963.

== Early years ==
Born in Barbados to Martin E. Doorly and Catherine Isabella Carrington, Doorly was educated at Harrison College in Bridgetown. From 1896 to 1898 he studied civil engineering in the West Indies. Doorly arrived in Omaha by 1900 as a surveyor with the Union Pacific Railroad. He spent two years working as a draftsman with the U.S. Army Corps of Engineers in Omaha. On September 7, 1904, Doorly married Margaret Hitchcock in Omaha, becoming the son-in-law of World-Herald publisher and politician Gilbert Hitchcock.

== Omaha World-Herald ==
Beginning as a reporter for the Omaha World-Herald, Doorly failed miserably, retaining his job only because he was the publisher's daughter's fiancé. Doorly became successful after moving to advertisement sales, advancing to advertising manager and then business manager for the newspaper.

Doorly took control of the newspaper in 1934 when his father-in-law, Gilbert M. Hitchcock, died. Reflecting the changing nature of the major American political parties and Doorly's personal disenchantment with the New Deal in the 1930s, he implemented the newspaper's editorial page shift toward a Republican Party policy stance.

Under Doorly's guidance, the paper soon standardized advertisement policies and procedures. To enforce brevity and variety, Doorly had a daily "Item Count" conducted to count the number of stories in each news category, including local news, society, and international sections. The staff consequently produced as many as 450 separate news stories a day.

=== Omaha Bee-News ===
In 1937, William Randolph Hearst sold Doorly the Bee-News, his main competitor in Omaha.

== Scrap drives ==
During World War II, Doorly used his position to lead a national campaign educating newspaper editors and publishers in promoting steel recycling to support the war.

== Legacy ==
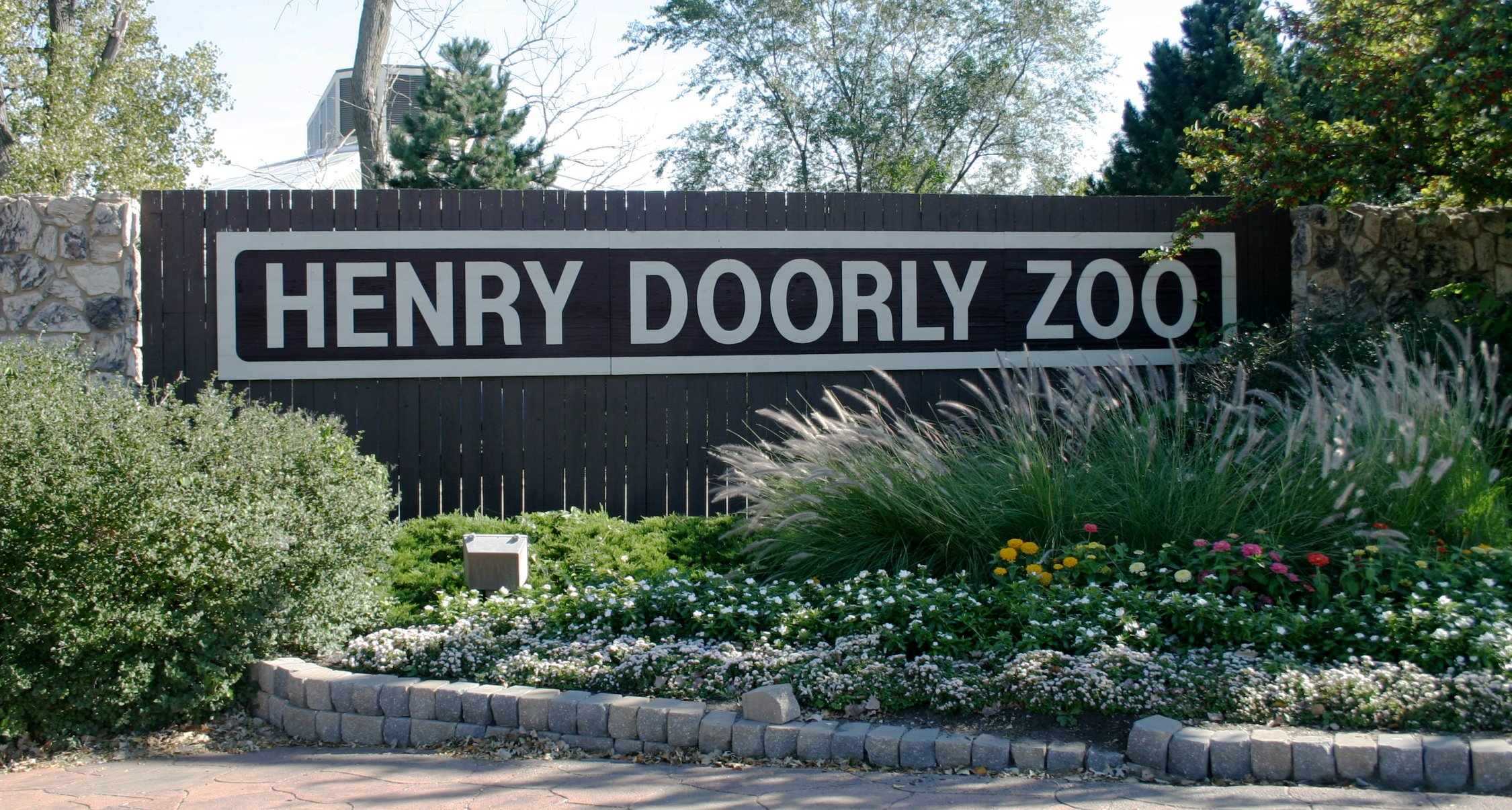
Sign for the Henry Doorly Zoo in Omaha, Nebraska

Doorly retired from the paper in 1950 and from World Publishing in 1955, leaving control of both newspapers to Walter E. Christiansen. He died in 1961 of an apparent heart attack.

In 1963, his widow Margaret Hitchcock Doorly donated $750,000 (approximately $8.18 million in 2026 dollars) to the Omaha Zoological Society. It was organized in 1953 to improve the Riverview Park Zoo and to provide administrative help to the city. With her donation, Doorly stipulated that the zoo be renamed in memory of her late husband.

Doorly and his wife are buried in Forest Lawn Memorial Park in Omaha.

== See also ==
- History of Omaha
