= Ed Koterba =

American journalist

- Born: Edward Victor Koterba; 17 May 1919; Omaha, Nebraska
- Died: 27 June 1961 (aged 42); La Push, Washington
- Occupation: journalist
- Relatives: Jeff Koterba (nephew), Artie Koterba

Edward Victor Koterba (17 May 1919 – 27 June 1961) was an American journalist known for his nationally syndicated columns "A Bit of Washington" and "Assignment Washington" as well as his investigative journalism for The Washington Post.

== Life and career ==
Koterba, the son of Czech immigrants, was born and raised in Omaha, Nebraska. After graduating from Omaha South High School in 1935, his first newspaper job was as a copy boy for the Omaha World-Herald. He briefly attended the University of Omaha in 1939, studying journalism and music while still working part-time for the Omaha World-Herald as a junior reporter and photographer. In 1940, he began working in Washington D.C. as a secretary in the War Department, and then as a secretary for Union Pacific Railroad.

He was drafted into the army in 1942, and primarily worked in military intelligence posts serving as a Russian and Czech interpreter. His language abilities were key in his placement at Camp Ritchie, Maryland, where he became one of the Ritchie Boys. After the war, he settled in Waynesboro, Pennsylvania, where he married Dorothy Chafont in September 1945. He was discharged from active duty in 1946, and began working for The Record Herald in Waynesboro (which at that time was run by his father-in-law, Floyd Chalfont). During his time at The Record Herald, he served as a reporter and editor, writing a popular daily column called "In Our County" under the pseudonym "Hank Hayseed".

When he was hired as a reporter and feature writer for the Washington Times-Herald in 1952, Koterba and his wife moved to Bethesda, Maryland with their young son. In his downtime, Koterba also began to write a daily column about the lighter side of political life in Washington, D.C. First called "Jottings from Washington" and later "A Bit of Washington", it was initially syndicated to The Record Herald, but was eventually syndicated nationally. When The Washington Post bought the Washington Times-Herald in 1954, they kept Koterba on as reporter and feature writer. His first big feature for the Post was a six-part exposé on gambling and election irregularities in Southern Maryland, which ran on the paper's front page and eventually led to two grand jury investigations.

Koterba left The Washington Post in 1955 to concentrate on his column "A Bit of Washington". He also became a frequent contributor to Roll Call and began writing a second column called "On Tour," in which he chronicled his family's adventures on their trailer tours of the United States. It was picked up by the Hall Syndicate in 1958, who billed Koterba as a "modern Ernie Pyle" and had plans to send him to various far-flung US Armed Forces bases around the world to cover the life of the GIs stationed there. The project came to an end in 1959 when Scripps Howard offered Koterba a job as their nationally syndicated Washington columnist, replacing Frederick Othman following his death in December 1958. The new column, "Assignment Washington" ran until Koterba's own death in 1961 at the age of 42. He was killed on 27 June 1961, along with four other people (including journalist Ned Trimble of the Kansas City Star) in a private plane crash off the coast of La Push, Washington.

On the day following the plane crash, John F. Kennedy opened his press conference on the Berlin Crisis with a tribute to Koterba:

I want to first of all express my regret at the information I've just received in regard to the death of our colleague in these press conferences and a fine newspaper man, Ed Koterba, who, I understand, was killed in a plane crash last night. He was a most--he was an outstanding newspaperman who was associated with Scripps-Howard, and we want to express our sympathy to members of his family and also to the papers with which he was associated. I want to say personally that I'm extremely sorry to have heard the news.

Koterba's name is inscribed on the Newseum's Journalists Memorial, along with over 2000 journalists from around the world who died in the course of their duties. In 2016, Koterba's son (who was nine years old at the time of his death) published The Essential Ed Koterba, a collection of his father's columns and articles spanning the course of his career.
