= KEZO-FM =

- Omaha, Nebraska; United States
- Broadcast area: Omaha–Council Bluffs metropolitan area
- Frequency: 92.3 MHz (HD Radio)
- Branding: Z-92

Programming
- Format: Mainstream rock

Ownership
- Owner: SummitMedia; (SM-KEZO-FM, LLC)
- Sister stations: KKCD; KQCH; KSRZ

History
- First air date: May 15, 1961 (as WOW-FM)
- Former call signs: WOW-FM (1961–1971); KFMX (1971–1973); KEZO (1973–1987)
- Call sign meaning: "Easy Omaha" (refers to previous format)

Technical information
- Licensing authority: FCC
- Facility ID: 74105
- Class: C0
- ERP: 95,000 watts
- HAAT: 360.9 meters (1,184 ft)
- Transmitter coordinates: 41°18′16″N 96°1′42.1″W

Links
- Public license information: Public file; LMS
- Webcast: Listen live
- Website: www.z92.com

KEZO-FM (92.3 MHz) is a commercial radio station in Omaha, Nebraska. It is owned by SummitMedia. KEZO airs a mainstream rock radio format. KEZO's studios are located on Mercy Road in Omaha's Aksarben Village, and the station's transmitter is off North 72nd Street and Crown Point at the Omaha master antenna farm.

Todd-n-Tyler (Mike Tyler and Todd Brandt) host the station's morning show, with the program syndicated to other radio stations.

== History ==
On May 15, 1961, the station signed on as WOW-FM, a sister station to WOW (590 AM, now KXSP). After initially simulcasting the AM station, it switched to broadcasting beautiful music. It became a Top 40 station for a short time in the early 1970s under the call letters KFMX. The station then switched back to easy listening music, and, in 1973, changed its call letters to KEZO, standing for "Easy Omaha". The station flipped to rock music at 9 a.m. on September 6, 1978, still keeping its KEZO call letters but using the identification "Z-92".

Notable former Z-92 announcers include Otis XII of the group Ogden Edsl and his long-time partner Diver Dan Doomey. A popular long-running feature of their morning show was Space Commander Wack, produced by Ralph Caldwell who was also the voice of announcer Yerzik Narge. Other recurring characters included the Mean Farmer and Lance Stallion, Radio Detective. Some notable DJs include Chuck Yates, Joe Blood, Rick Setchell, and Tim Bourke.

Journal Communications and the E. W. Scripps Company announced on July 30, 2014, that the two companies would merge to create a new media company under the E.W. Scripps Company name that would own the two companies' broadcast properties, including KEZO-FM. The transaction was completed in 2015. Scripps exited radio in 2018; the Omaha stations went to SummitMedia in a four-market, $47 million deal completed on November 1, 2018.
