= KSPI-FM =

- Stillwater, Oklahoma; United States
- Frequency: 93.7 MHz
- Branding: Hot 93.7

Programming
- Format: Hot adult contemporary

Ownership
- Owner: Stillwater Broadcasting, LLC
- Sister stations: KSPI, KGFY, KVRO

History
- First air date: November 1, 1947

Technical information
- Licensing authority: FCC
- Facility ID: 63438
- Class: C2
- ERP: 16,000 watts
- HAAT: 270 meters (890 ft)
- Transmitter coordinates: 36.10833°N 97.19639°W

Links
- Public license information: Public file; LMS
- Webcast: Listen live
- Website: stillwaterradio.net/kspi-fm/kspi-fm-line-up

KSPI-FM is a radio station airing a Hot AC format licensed to Stillwater, Oklahoma, broadcasting on 93.7 FM. The station is owned by Stillwater Broadcasting, LLC. It has broadcast Oklahoma State football and men's basketball since its sign-on and also carries OSU wrestling and baseball.
