= Jeff Koterba =

American cartoonist

Jeffrey Arthur Koterba
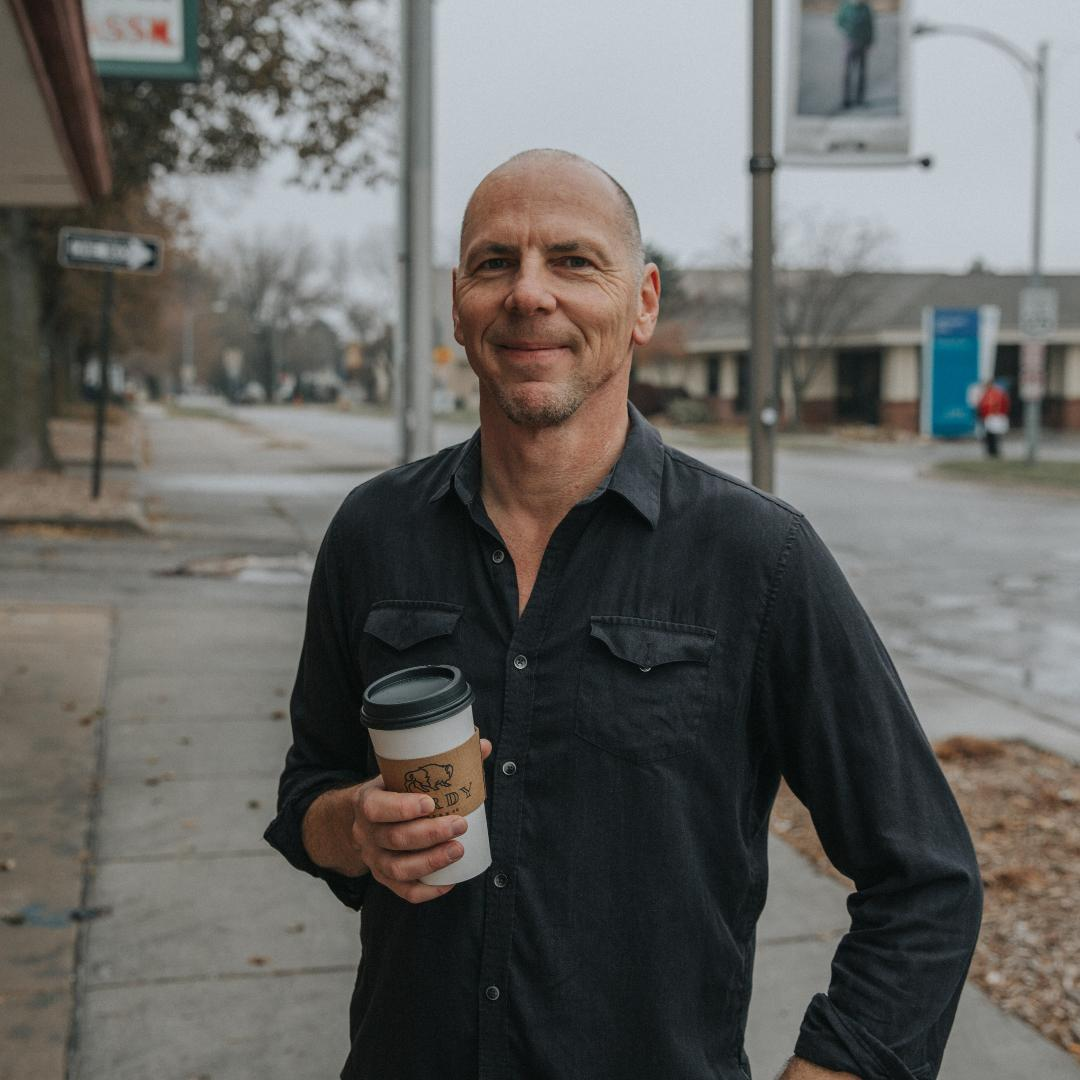
- Born: May 6, 1961; Omaha, Nebraska
- Occupations: Editorial Cartoonist & Musician
- Relatives: Ed Koterba (uncle)

Jeffrey Koterba (born May 6, 1961) is an American editorial cartoonist based in Omaha, Nebraska. He was the editorial cartoonist for the Omaha World-Herald from 1989 until September 2020 and his work is syndicated nationwide to over 850 newspapers by Cagle Cartoons.

== Biography ==
Koterba started drawing editorial cartoons for the Omaha South High School newspaper. While at the University of Nebraska at Omaha he was the editorial cartoonist of the college newspaper, the Gateway. In college, he also drew cartoons for the suburban Omaha newspaper, the Bellevue Leader. After college he drew sports cartoons on a part-time basis for the Kansas City Star from 1986 to 1989 where his work also regularly appeared in the Los Angeles Times. He was hired by the Omaha World-Herald in 1989 as the editorial cartoonist, filling a 9-year void at that position. While at the World Herald, Koterba has occasionally written editorials and feature stories. Koterba describes himself as "passionate centrist".

== Work ==
His work regularly appears in many major U.S. newspapers, including The New York Times, Chicago Tribune, USA Today, The Atlanta Journal-Constitution, The Washington Post and CNN. He has also been featured in many magazines and high-profile websites. His cartoons regularly appear in the Best Editorial Cartoons of the Year, and Best Political Cartoons of the Year publications. Koterba also regularly appears on panels discussing his craft. In 2009, he was part of an editorial cartooning panel at San Diego Comic-Con. He has appeared as a panelist discussing his cartooning on Fox News and has been a featured guest on Public Radio International's Michael Feldman's Whad'Ya Know?.

Koterba has written for The Huffington Post, ABC News, and The Daily Beast. In 2009, he was named a finalist in the Great Plains Journalism Awards for a three-part essay he wrote for the Omaha World Herald titled "Ink and Ash". His fiction has appeared in Parcel, and his graphic nonfiction has appeared in Ecotone. Koterba has given two TEDx talks where he's discussed Tourette's syndrome, vulnerability, and cartooning.

Koterba is the lead singer, guitarist and songwriter for the Omaha-based swing and jump-blues band the Prairie Cats, who have released three albums. The Prairie Cats have been featured at the South by Southwest music festival, the Hudson River Festival, have toured nationally, and appears in the motion picture Lucky featuring Ann-Margret, Colin Hanks, and Ari Graynor. They have been included on several Sony/BMG compilations in Europe alongside the likes of Tony Bennett, Natalie Cole, and Frank Sinatra.

He has published three collections of his cartoons including a book on Nebraska Cornhuskers football cartoons he drew while in college. In October 2009, Houghton Mifflin Harcourt published Koterba's memoir, Inklings, which deals with his dysfunctional childhood and his lifelong love of cartooning and music.

Many of his original cartoon drawings are regularly available for sale on eBay.

On April 5, 2010, two original Koterba cartoons blasted off into space aboard Space Shuttle Discovery compliments of astronaut Clayton Anderson.

Koterba was laid off by the Omaha World Herald on September 18, 2020, after 31 years of employment.

== Awards ==
In 1983 Koterba was awarded the Mark of Excellence Award for college cartooning from the Society of Professional Journalists. In 1996 he was a finalist for the H.L. Mencken Award, placed second in the 2000 and 2012 National Headliner Awards and in 2002 he was a finalist for Editorial Cartoonist of the Year (Reuben Award) from the National Cartoonists Society. In 2009, 2010, 2013, 2016, and 2017 Koterba won first place for editorial cartooning in the Great Plains Journalism Awards.

On May 6, 2010, Koterba was honored by the Omaha Press Club as his "Face" was put on the Barroom Floor. He was the 125th "Face" in a tradition dating back to 1971. Past honorees have ranged from local politicians, business leaders and members of the press to national figures with Omaha ties such as Warren Buffett, Johnny Carson, and President Gerald Ford. The "Face on the Barroom Floor" is a drawing of Koterba and his life that is encased on the barroom floor to be walked upon and admired by members until a new "Face" is unveiled. His "Face" will then be moved to a lofty position on the club's walls.

In 2018 Koterba was nominated for a Heartland Chapter Emmy Award for his work in connection with KMTV television on a segment concerning the cartooning process.

== Personal life ==
Koterba has Tourette syndrome and also survived a lightning strike in high school. He has one child, Josh Koterba, who is a singer and a songwriter. Koterba lives in the Benson neighborhood area of Omaha, Nebraska.

Koterba is friends with filmmaker Alexander Payne and was an extra in Payne's 2002 film About Schmidt. However, his scene was deleted. A Koterba cartoon also appeared in Payne's 1999 film Election.

Koterba is friends with astronaut Clayton Anderson and has featured him in several cartoons.

In March 2012, "Voluntary Gestures" a short film by Canadian filmmaker Stefan Morel on Koterba and his experience with Tourette's syndrome, debuted at the Omaha Film Festival. Not only is Koterba the central figure in the movie, he penned drawings for the film and with his son Josh, wrote and composed original music for it.

== Books ==
- The Big Red Cartoon Book (1985)
- Illustrator, To Spank or Not to Spank(1994), Rosemond, John, author
- Jeff Koterba Back from the Drawing Board (1995)
- Inklings (2009)
- Koterba: Drawing You In (2014)
