= KHUB =

- Fremont, Nebraska; United States
- Broadcast area: Fremont, Nebraska
- Frequency: 1340 kHz
- Branding: The Big Dog

Programming
- Format: Country
- Affiliations: ABC News Radio

Ownership
- Owner: Steven W. Seline; (Walnut Radio, LLC)
- Sister stations: KFMT-FM

History
- First air date: December 22, 1939
- Former call signs: KORN (1939–1949); KFGT (1949–1958)

Technical information
- Licensing authority: FCC
- Facility ID: 34550
- Class: C
- Power: 500 watts (day); 250 watts (night)
- Transmitter coordinates: 41°25′58.00″N 96°27′16.00″W
- Translator: 98.9 K255DF (Fremont)

Links
- Public license information: Public file; LMS
- Website: thebestmix1055.com

KHUB (1340 AM) is a radio station broadcasting a country music format. Licensed to Fremont, Nebraska, United States, the station serves the Fremont area with fringe coverage to west Omaha. The station is currently owned by Steven W. Seline, through licensee Walnut Radio, LLC, and features programming from ABC News Radio.

== History ==
In October 1938, Lloyd Thomas, a former NBC official, announced at Hotel Pathfinder that Fremont needed its own radio station. On October 4, 1939, the Nebraska Broadcasting Corporation announced its intent to erect a radio station in Fremont after receiving FCC approval. On October 28, it was announced that the radio station would be named KORN. On November 5, it was announced that the stations studios would be located in Hotel Pathfinder. Construction of the transmission tower was originally meant to happen on December 13, 1939. However, due to shipping delays, construction did not start until December 16.

The station officially launched on December 22, 1939. Federal Communications Commission records state that the station was licensed on September 23, 1947. The call letters were later changed to KFGT. In 1958, the station took the callsign KHUB; it had originally belonged to a station in Watsonville, California, now KOMY (coincidentally, also on 1340 kHz).

On January 1, 2014, KHUB changed its format from news/talk to classic hits. On February 1, 2018, KHUB changed its format from classic hits to country, branded as "The Big Dog", simulcasting on FM translator K255DF 98.9 FM Fremont.
