= Aksarben Village =

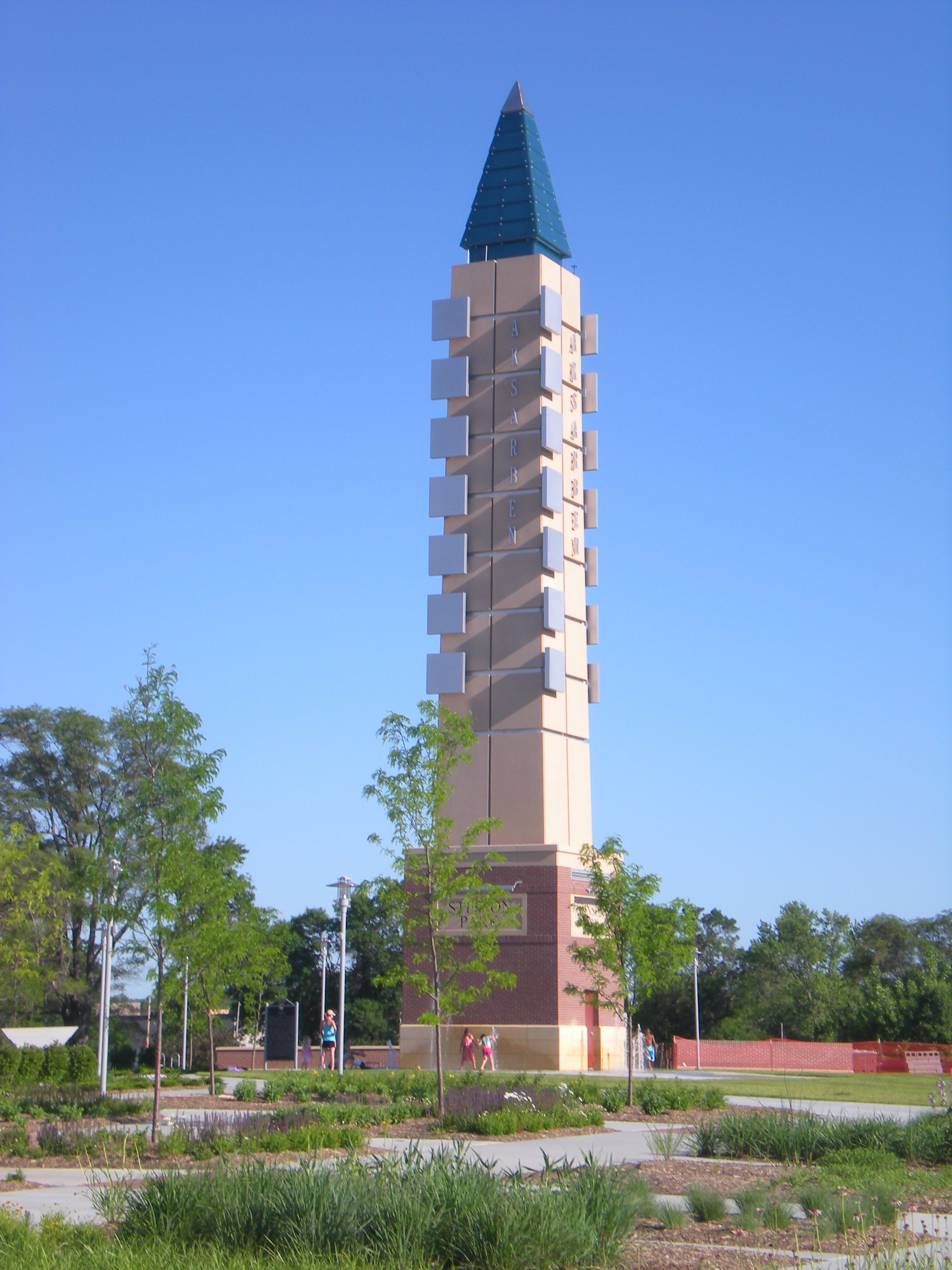
- The Obelisk in Stinson Park in 2010

General information
- Status: Completed
- Location: Omaha, Nebraska, U.S.
- Coordinates: 41.238°N 96.015°W
- Completed: 2008; 18 years ago

Location in the United States
Location in Nebraska

Aksarben Village is a mixed-use development in Omaha, Nebraska, United States. Measuring over one million square feet (93,000 m^{2}), it is on the land of the former Ak-Sar-Ben coliseum and horse track. Aksarben is Nebraska spelled backwards.

There is over 750,000 sq ft (70,000 m^{2}) of space for research and business office and 250,000 sq ft (23,000 m^{2}) of retail and entertainment space. There are over five hundred housing units and a 135-room hotel. There is also a 4.5-acre (1.8 ha) park that features a 90-foot (27 m) obelisk.

== History ==
Aksarben was one of the "model communities" designed in the mid-1930s by the Resettlement Administration, one of Franklin D. Roosevelt's New Deal federal agencies, under the direction of Rexford G. Tugwell. The community was intended to be a "'dream city' of thirty-eight green-shuttered houses, each on seven acres of land twenty miles west of Omaha on the Platte River." This plan failed to materialize, as the imagined dream city failed to attract residents. Aksarben quickly became deserted, as Henry C. Glissman, a nearby farmer who observed this project, had predicted: "[I]n time these homes will all be abandoned and stand as a gruesome monument to a government's inefficiency and folly in fostering a movement that to a practical mind has the earmarks of failure from the start."

After the Knights of Ak-Sar-Ben turned over the land to Douglas County in the 1990s, the county first tried to keep the horse track and coliseum open, but both failed. The land was then turned over to the Aksarben Future Trust who now owns the land.

On June 26, 2005, plans were announced to turn the land into a pedestrian friendly mixed-use development combined with the south campus of University of Nebraska Omaha, Aksarben Campus, and the already built First Data Campus. Construction began in 2006 and the first businesses began to open in 2008.

== Developments ==
Aksarben Village is home to some of Omaha's major companies. Blue Cross Blue Shield of Nebraska has built and is occupying a 10-story building that opened in 2010 to house their headquarters. First Data built two office buildings there in the mid-2000s. Other business that have opened offices include DLR Group, Grubb & Ellis/Pacific Realty, and Olsson.

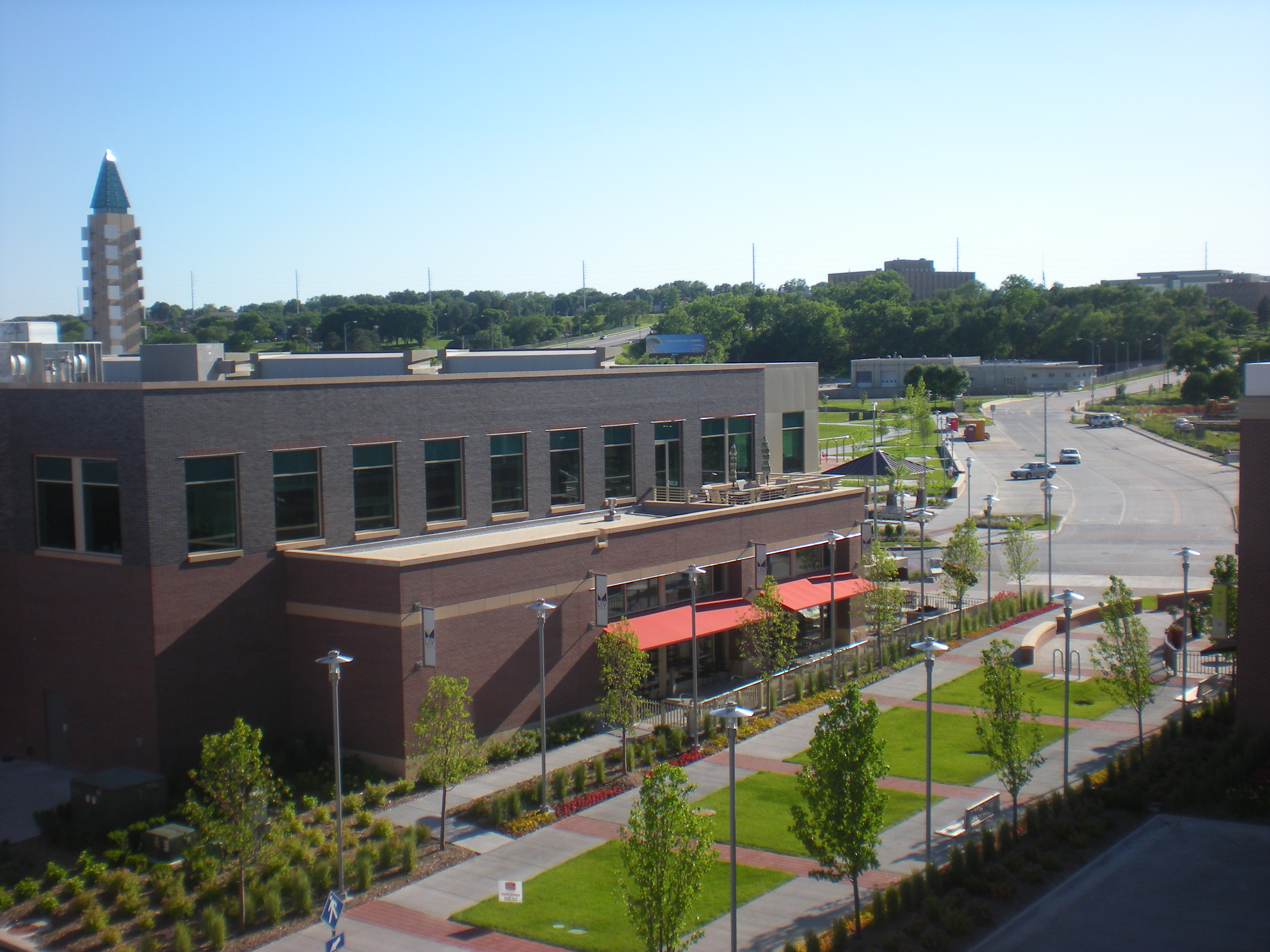
Additional developments in Aksarben Village.

Several restaurants such as Jones Bros. Cupcakes, Godfather's Pizza and Juice Stop have opened, as well as a bank, a Voodoo Taco, a Spirit World wine and liquor seller, a hair salon, and multiple bars and lounges. Two apartment complexes have opened, Broadmoor and the Pinhook Flats, named in reference to the historic horse track which used to occupy the land. Together the apartments add over 500 housing units to the development.

A 135-room Marriott Hotel opened in 2008; Aksarben Cinema, a 10-screen movie theater debuted in late 2010 and shortly after an Aspen Athletic Club fitness center opened in the same complex. Mojo Steakhouse and Ales, a full-service restaurant and bar, opened in 2011 in the same complex.

The University of Nebraska Omaha has built their south campus, Aksarben Campus, at the north end of Aksarben Village. The university has added ten three-story dormitory buildings, Scott Village, which opened in 2003 and houses 480 units. The Scott Technology Center and the Peter Kiewit Institute are world class educational and research facilities that partner with UNO and are located on campus. The university has also built the new Baxter Arena at the south end of Aksarben Village.

Within Aksarben Village is Stinson Park, a multi-acre neighborhood and community park named after Kenneth E. Stinson, a former chairman of the Knights of Ak-Sar-Ben and Kiewit Corporation.

== See also ==
- List of geographic names derived from anagrams and ananyms
