= Mass media in Omaha, Nebraska =

This is a list of mass media serving the Omaha metropolitan area in Omaha, Nebraska, and Council Bluffs, Iowa.

== Radio ==
Start dates are for the frequency/station license, not for callsign or programming that may have moved from license to license. Omaha radio stations gets 25 Analog FM stations, 11 Digital HD Radio FM stations including 10 subchannels Like HD-2 and HD-3, 11 Analog AM stations, and 1 Digital HD Radio AM Station affiliated KFAB.

=== AM ===
AM radio stations
Frequency	HD	Call sign	Name	Format	Owner	City
660 AM	No	KCRO	Omaha's Christian Talk	Christian Talk	Hickory Radio	Omaha, Nebraska
1020 AM	No	KMMQ	La Preciosa	Spanish (Regional Mexican)	NRG Media	Plattsmouth/Omaha
1110 AM	1	KFAB	NewsRadio 1110	News/Talk	iHeartMedia, Inc.	Omaha, Nebraska
1180 AM	No	KZOT	Yacht Rock	Rock	Usher Media Group	Bellevue/Omaha
1290 AM	No	KOIL	Koil News Talk	News/Talk	Usher Media Group	Omaha, Nebraska
1340 AM	No	KHUB	The Big Dog	Country	Walnut Radio	Fremont, Nebraska
1420 AM	No	KXCB	Bluffs Country 106.5	Country	Hickory Radio	Omaha, Nebraska
1490 AM	No	KIBM	Boomer Radio	Oldies	Walnut Radio	Omaha, Nebraska
1560 AM	No	KLNG	--	Christian	Wilkins Communications	Council Bluffs, Iowa
1620 AM	No	KOZN	The Zone; Fox Sports Radio	Sports	Usher Media Group	Bellevue/Omaha

=== FM ===
FM radio stations
Frequency	HD	Call sign	Name	Format	Owner	City
88.1 FM	No	KMLV	K-LOVE	Contemporary Christian Music	Educational Media Foundation	Ralston/Omaha
88.9 FM	No	KYFG	Spirit Catholic Radio	Christian	VSS Catholic Communications	Omaha, Nebraska
89.7 FM	No	KIWR	89.7 The River	College/Alternative	Iowa Western Comm. Coll.	Council Bluffs, Iowa
90.7 FM	3	KVNO	Classical 90.7	Classical	Univ. of Nebraska at Omaha	Omaha, Nebraska
91.5 FM	1	KIOS	Omaha Public Radio/NPR	Public radio	Omaha Public Schools	Omaha, Nebraska
92.3 FM	2	KEZO	Z92	Active rock	SummitMedia	Omaha, Nebraska
92.7 FM	No	K224DJ	My Bridge Radio	Christian rebroadcasts KRKR	My Bridge Radio	La Vista/Omaha
93.3 FM	2	KFFF	93.3 The Wolf	Classic country	iHeartMedia, Inc.	Bennington/Omaha
93.7 FM	No	K229BI	Bott Radio Network	Christian rebroadcasts KLCV	Community Broadcasting	Omaha, Nebraska
94.1 FM	1	KQCH	Channel 94.1	Top 40 (CHR/Pop)	SummitMedia	Omaha, Nebraska
94.5 FM	No	K233CO	Boomer Radio	Oldies rebroadcasts KIBM (AM)	Walnut Radio	Omaha, Nebraska
96.1 FM	2	KISO	96.1 KISS FM	Top 40 (CHR/Pop)	iHeartMedia, Inc.	Omaha, Nebraska
97.3 FM	No	KOBM-FM	Boomer Radio	Oldies	Walnut Radio	Blair, Nebraska
97.7 FM	2	KBBX-FM	Lobo 97.7	Spanish (Regional Mexican)	Flood Communications of Omaha LLC	Nebraska City/Omaha
98.5 FM	No	KQKQ	Sweet 98.5	Hot AC	Usher Media Group	Council Bluffs, Iowa; Omaha-Council Bluffs metropolitan area
99.9 FM	2	KGOR	Super Hits 99.9	Classic Hits; Oldies	iHeartMedia, Inc.	Omaha, Nebraska
100.7 FM	No	KGBI-FM	100.7 KGBI FM	Contemporary Christian music	University of Northwestern – St. Paul	Omaha, Nebraska
101.9 FM	No	KOOO	101.9 FM	News/Talk	Nebraska Public Media	La Vista/Omaha
102.7 FM	No	KVSS	Spirit Catholic Radio	Christian	VSS Catholic Communications	Omaha, Nebraska
103.7 FM	3	KXKT	Kat 103.7	Country	iHeartMedia, Inc.	Glenwood/Omaha
104.5 FM	2	KSRZ	Star 104.5	Hot AC; 80's	SummitMedia	Omaha, Nebraska
105.5 FM	No	KFMT	Gold 105.5	Classic rock	NRG Media	Fremont, Nebraska
105.9 FM	1	KKCD	Classic Rock 105.9	Classic rock	SummitMedia	Omaha, Nebraska
106.9 FM	No	KOPW	Country One 106.9	Country	Usher Media Group	Plattsmouth/Omaha
107.7 FM	No	KIMI	Air1	contemporary worship music	Educational Media Foundation	Malvern, Iowa/Omaha

== Television ==
Omaha TV stations gets 8 full-powered Digital channels including 30 subchannels, 1 low-powered Digital channel including 2 subchannels, and 1 Audio-only subchannel as KBBX-FM. In Spring 2022 KXVO channel 15 was launched and became the first television station in the State of Nebraska and Western Iowa to use ATSC 3.0 including 2 subchannels are KXVO (ROAR), and KPTM (Fox) and 3 DRM subchannels both are KMTV-TV (CBS), WOWT (NBC) and KETV (ABC), and 5 Internet streaming subchannels are KYNE (PBS), T2, Pickleball TV, GameLoop, and ROXi.

Television stations in the Omaha Metro area (Ascending order)
Virtual Ch. ATSC	Call	City	Owner	Start	Digital Ch. RF	DTV HD	Audio	Nickname	Programming
3.1	KMTV	Omaha	E. W. Scripps Company	1949	31	1080i	5.1 (SAP) (AD)	3 News Now	CBS
3.2	KMTV	Omaha	E. W. Scripps Company	1949	31	720p	Stereo	Grit	Grit
3.3	KMTV	Omaha	E. W. Scripps Company	1949	31	480i	Stereo	LAFF-TV	Laff
3.4	KMTV	Omaha	E. W. Scripps Company	1949	31	480i	Stereo	Mystery	Ion Mystery
3.5	KMTV	Omaha	E. W. Scripps Company	1949	31	480i	Stereo	CourtTV	Court TV
6.1	WOWT	Omaha	Gray Television	1949	22	1080i	5.1 (SAP) (AD)	First Alert 6	NBC
6.2	WOWT	Omaha	Gray Television	1949	22	480i	Stereo	COZI	Cozi TV
6.3	WOWT	Omaha	Gray Television	1949	22	480i	Stereo	HandI	H&I
6.4	WOWT	Omaha	Gray Television	1949	22	480i	Stereo	ION TV	Ion Television
6.5	WOWT	Omaha	Gray Television	1949	22	480i	Stereo	StartTV	Start TV
6.6	WOWT	Omaha	Gray Television	1949	22	480i	Stereo	The 365	The 365
6.7	WOWT	Omaha	Gray Television	1949	22	480i	Stereo	Outlaw	Outlaw
7.1	KETV	Omaha	Hearst Television	1957	20	1080i	5.1 (SAP) (AD)	Newswatch 7	ABC
7.2	KETV	Omaha	Hearst Television	1957	20	480i	Stereo	KETV-ME	Me-TV
7.3	KETV	Omaha	Hearst Television	1957	20	480i	Stereo	STORYTV	Story
7.4	KETV	Omaha	Hearst Television	1957	20	480i	Stereo	ION PLUS	Ion Plus
7.5	KETV	Omaha	Hearst Television	1957	20	480i	Stereo	getTV	GetTV
7.6	KETV	Omaha	Hearst Television	1957	20	480i	Stereo	QVC	QVC
15.1	KXVO	Omaha	Mitts Telecasting (operated through SSA by Sinclair Broadcast Group)	1995	29	480i	Stereo	ROAR	Roar
15.2	KXVO	Omaha	Mitts Telecasting (operated through SSA by Sinclair Broadcast Group)	1995	29	480i	Stereo	The Nest	The Nest
15.3	KXVO	Omaha	Mitts Telecasting (operated through SSA by Sinclair Broadcast Group)	1995	29	480i	Stereo	Charge!	Charge!
26.1	KYNE; NEB PUBLIC MEDIA	Omaha	Nebraska Public Media Foundation	1965	17	1080i	Stereo (SAP)	NE-PBS	PBS
26.2	KYNE; NEB PUBLIC MEDIA	Omaha	Nebraska Public Media Foundation	1965	17	1080i	Stereo (SAP)	NE-W	World
26.3	KYNE; NEB PUBLIC MEDIA	Omaha	Nebraska Public Media Foundation	1965	17	720p	Stereo (SAP)	NE-C	Create
26.4	KYNE; NEB PUBLIC MEDIA	Omaha	Nebraska Public Media Foundation	1965	17	480i	Stereo (SAP)	NE-KIDS	PBS Kids
26.5	KYNE; NEB PUBLIC MEDIA	Omaha	Nebraska Public Media Foundation	1965	17	480i	Stereo (SAP)	NE-FNX	FNX
27.1	KOHA-LD	Omaha	Flood Communications of Omaha LLC	1992	30	1080i	Stereo	Telemundo Nebraska	Telemundo
27.2	KOHA-LD	Omaha	Flood Communications of Omaha LLC	1992	30	720p	Stereo	NCN-S	News Channel Nebraska (Ind.)
27.3	KOHA-LD	Omaha	Flood Communications of Omaha LLC	1992	30	480i	Stereo	DayStar	Daystar
27.4	KOHA-LD	Omaha	Flood Communications of Omaha LLC	1992	30	Audio-only	Stereo	Lobo 97.7	KBBX-FM
32.1	KBIN; IOWA PBS	Council Bluffs	Iowa Public Broadcasting Board	1975	33	1080i	Stereo	IOWA PBS	PBS
32.2	KBIN; IOWA PBS	Council Bluffs	Iowa Public Broadcasting Board	1975	33	720p	Stereo (SAP)	IOWA PBS Kids	PBS Kids
32.3	KBIN; IOWA PBS	Council Bluffs	Iowa Public Broadcasting Board	1975	33	480i	Stereo	IOWA PBS World	World
32.4	KBIN; IOWA PBS	Council Bluffs	Iowa Public Broadcasting Board	1975	33	480i	Stereo	IOWA PBS Create	Create
36.1	KHIN; IOWA PBS	Red Oak	Iowa Public Broadcasting Board	1975	35	1080i	Stereo	IOWA PBS	PBS
36.2	KHIN; IOWA PBS	Red Oak	Iowa Public Broadcasting Board	1975	35	720p	Stereo (SAP)	IOWA PBS Kids	PBS Kids
36.3	KHIN; IOWA PBS	Red Oak	Iowa Public Broadcasting Board	1975	35	480i	Stereo	IOWA PBS World	World
36.4	KHIN; IOWA PBS	Red Oak	Iowa Public Broadcasting Board	1975	35	480i	Stereo	IOWA PBS Create	Create
42.1	KPTM	Omaha	Sinclair Broadcast Group	1986	26	720p	5.1; Stereo (SAP) (AD)	FOX42	Fox
42.2	KPTM	Omaha	Sinclair Broadcast Group	1986	26	480i	Stereo	MyNetTV Dabl	MyNetworkTV; Dabl
42.3	KPTM	Omaha	Sinclair Broadcast Group	1986	26	720p	Stereo	CW	CW
42.4	KPTM	Omaha	Sinclair Broadcast Group	1986	26	480i	Stereo	Comet	Comet

== Print ==
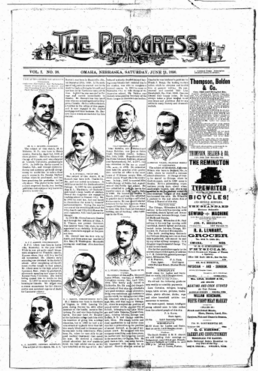
Cover page of The Progress, June 21, 1890

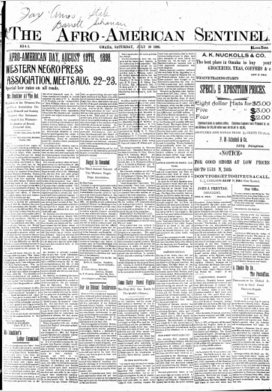
Cover page of The Afro-American Sentinel, Saturday, July 30, 1898

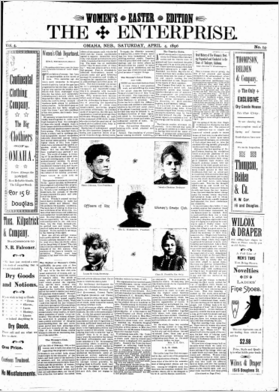
Cover of The Enterprise, April 4, 1896

The Omaha World-Herald, the Omaha Bee, and by 1900 the Omaha Daily News had developed into the city's most influential journals.

The African American community in Omaha has had several newspapers serve it. The first was the Progress, established in 1889 by Ferdinand L. Barnett. Cyrus D. Bell, an ex-slave, established the Afro-American Sentinel in 1892. In 1893 George F. Franklin started publishing the Enterprise, later published by Thomas P. Mahammitt. It was the longest lived of any of the early African American newspapers published in Omaha. The best known and most widely read of all African American newspapers in the city was the Omaha Monitor, established in 1915, edited and published by Reverend John Albert Williams. It stopped being published in 1929. In 1906, Lucille Skaggs Edwards published, The Women's Aurora, making her the first black woman to publish a magazine in Nebraska. George Wells Parker, co-founder of the Hamitic League of the World, founded the New Era in Omaha from 1920 through until 1926. The Omaha Guide was established by B.V. and C.C. Galloway in 1927. The Guide, with a circulation of over twenty-five thousand and an advertisers' list including business firms from coast to coast, was the largest African American newspaper west of the Missouri River. The Omaha Star, founded by Mildred Brown, began publication in 1938, and continues today as the only African American newspaper in Omaha.

=== Current ===
Current newspapers and online newspapers in the Omaha Metro area alphabetical
Name	Description
Daily Nonpareil	Council Bluffs and western/southwestern Iowa daily newspaper established in 1857
The Daily Record	Monday through Friday, daily business and legal newspaper, Omaha, established in 1886
Douglas-Sarpy County Post-Gazette	Newspaper based in Elkhorn covering local news from western Douglas and Sarpy counties. Predecessors include the Waterloo Gazette (1881), Douglas County Gazette (1934), and the Douglas County Post-Gazette (1983).
metroMAGAZINE	A greater Omaha lifestyle, dining, entertainment and events magazine
Omaha Star	Founded in 1938, today it is Nebraska's longest-running and only African American newspaper
Omaha World-Herald	Omaha's local daily newspaper
Current publishers and printing in the Omaha Metro area alphabetical
Name	Description
Aradius Group	Omaha commercial printing, publishing, direct mail and creative service. Originally, Omaha Printing Company, established 1858.

=== Historic ===
Historic newspapers in the Omaha Metro area alphabetical
Name	Description
Arrow	Founded in 1854, it was the first newspaper in Omaha
Nebraskian	Founded in 1854
Times	Founded in 1857
Democrat	Founded in 1858
Republican	Founded in 1858 under Dr. Gilbert C. Monell and from 1859 to 1861 was under E. D. Webster
Telegraph	Founded in 1860
Daily Herald	Founded in 1865 under Dr. George L. Miller
Daily Evening Tribune	Founded in 1870 with Phineas W. Hitchcock as a chief stockholder
Evening Bee	Founded in 1871
Den Danske Pioneer	The Danish Pioneer was founded in Omaha in 1872 and printed in the city until 1958
Bee	Founded in 1874, bought by World-Herald in 1937 and closed
The Evening World	Founded in 1885; purchased The Daily Herald in 1889
The Progress	Founded in 1889 by Ferdinand L. Barnett as an African-American newspaper
Afro-American Sentinel	Founded in 1892 by Cyrus D. Bell as an African-American newspaper
Enterprise	Founded in 1893 by George F. Franklin, later published by Thomas P. Mahammitt as an African-American newspaper
The Women's Aurora	Founded in 1906 by Lucille Skaggs Edwards
Omaha Tribune	Founded in 1912 as a national German-language weekly; publishing company still operates in Omaha as the Interstate Printing Company
Omaha Monitor	Founded in 1915 by Father John Albert Williams as an African-American newspaper
New Era	Founded in 1920 by George Wells Parker as an African-American newspaper
Omaha Guide	Founded in 1927 by B.V. and C.C. Galloway as an African-American newspaper
