= KOOO =

- La Vista, Nebraska; United States
- Broadcast area: Lincoln–Omaha, Nebraska
- Frequency: 101.9 MHz

Programming
- Format: Public radio

Ownership
- Owner: Nebraska Public Media

History
- First air date: June 22, 1958
- Former call signs: KFMQ (1958–1992); KYNN (1992–1994); KGDE (1994–1998); KZFX (1998–2002); KLTQ (2002–2007)
- Former frequencies: 95.3 MHz (1958–1973)
- Call sign meaning: "The Big O" (former station branding)

Technical information
- Licensing authority: FCC
- Facility ID: 35067
- Class: C
- ERP: 100,000 watts
- HAAT: 365 meters (1,198 ft)
- Transmitter coordinates: 41°03′1.00″N 96°11′33.00″W

Links
- Public license information: Public file; LMS
- Website: nebraskapublicmedia.org

KOOO (101.9 FM) is a radio station licensed to La Vista, Nebraska, United States. The station serves the Lincoln and Omaha areas. The station is currently owned by Nebraska Public Radio. Its transmitter site is located southwest of Springfield, Nebraska.

== History ==
The station was assigned the call sign KFMQ-FM beginning in 1958, and was located on 95.3 FM. In 1973, KFMQ moved to 101.9 FM. The station was initially licensed to Lincoln.

=== Rock (1973–1992) ===
Beginning in 1973, 101.9 FM was known as "Q102, Nebraska's Rock & Roll Legend", carrying an Album Rock format.

=== Country (1992–1995) ===
The country format lasted until noon on October 3, 1992, when, without warning, the format was dropped and flipped to "Omaha's Young Country, 101.9 KYNN". While the "Hit Kicker" began to gnaw its way up the ratings chart, the station failed to make money, with Midwest Communications selling the station to Mitchell Broadcasting, owner of KKAR, KOIL, and KQKQ.

=== Alternative (1995–1998) ===
On February 17, 1995, at midnight, KYNN began stunting with an automated countdown. At 6 p.m. on February 21, KYNN became Nebraska's first alternative rock station as "101.9/107.7 The Edge", with a translator on K299AK (107.7 FM) to better cover Omaha (at the time, the station's transmitter was located southeast of Eagle, Nebraska; the transmitter would be moved to its current location in late 2001, while K299AK would later simulcast KBLR-FM's then-urban contemporary format until 2007, when that format moved to KCTY and the translator was discontinued due to a new sign-on from Malvern, Iowa), with the new call sign KGDE.

=== Classic hits (1998–2002) ===
On April 10, 1998, at 3 p.m., "The Edge" signed off and began stunting by playing "It's the End of the World as We Know It (And I Feel Fine)" by R.E.M on a loop until 7 p.m. that evening, then went into a simulcast of Sweet 98, before flipping to classic hits as "101.9 The Fox" on the 13th at 5:30 a.m., with new call sign KZFX adopted on April 24.

=== Adult contemporary (2002–2007) ===
"The Fox" ended on February 1, 2002, as 101.9 began stunting with the song "Winter Wonderland" on a loop until flipping to adult contemporary as "Lite Rock 101.9" on the 4th at 9 a.m., with new call sign KLTQ to go along with the change.

=== Adult hits (2007–2014) ===
The format lasted until 3 p.m. on December 26, 2007, when 101.9 flipped to Adult Hits as "101.9 The Big O", and adopted its current call sign two days later. The original KOOO had been an AM radio station in Omaha.

=== Classic rock (2014–2020) ===
On August 11, 2014, 101.9's website was replaced by a picture of a genie's lamp, with the words, "WHAT'S YOUR WISH?". At the same time, KOOO removed all imaging on the former "Big O." The new format, according to website registration, was to be country as 101.9 The Hog. These rumors were confirmed, as 101.9 began running liners the following day saying that the following day at 4 PM, "your wish will come true". 1019thehog.com also ran a countdown clock to the same time, saying the similar "Your Wish Comes True [*] days [*] hours [*] minutes [*] seconds August 13, 2014". However, in a similar way as WLTQ in Milwaukee did so in 2004, KOOO instead flipped to 80s-based Classic rock as 101.9 The Keg at the promised time. The last song on "The Big O" was "Goodbye" by Night Ranger, while the first song on "The Keg" was "Kickstart My Heart" by Mötley Crüe. The station would evolve towards a more broad-based rock hits direction (similar to its previous adult hits format) with the addition of 1980s' pop, and 1990s' and early-2000s' rock tracks.

=== Adult hits/Classic alternative (2020–2026) ===
Logo as The Keg

On January 13, 2020, KOOO shifted their format back to a straight forward variety hits direction, while retaining the "Keg" moniker.

In January 2026, KOOO shifted to a classic alternative rock format, while retaining the "Keg" moniker.

=== Sale to Nebraska Public Media (2026-) ===
On February 2, 2026, as part of NRG Media selling their Omaha stations to Usher Media Group, Nebraska Public Media announced that it acquired KOOO from NRG for $1.2 million. Upon the completion of the sale on May 13, 2026, KOOO flipped to a hybrid news/talk and adult album alternative format. The last song played on the "Keg" was "It's the End of the World as We Know It (And I Feel Fine)" by R.E.M.
