= KTWI =

KTWI may refer to:

- KTWI-LP, a low-power radio station (94.3 FM) licensed to serve Liberal, Kansas, United States
- KFFF (FM), a radio station (93.3 FM) licensed to serve Bennington, Nebraska, United States, which held the call sign KTWI from 2008 to 2012
