= KHUS =

KHUS may refer to:

- KHUS (FM), a radio station (98.1 FM) licensed to serve Huslia, Alaska, United States
- KFFF (FM), a radio station (93.3 FM) licensed to serve Bennington, Nebraska, United States, which held the call sign KHUS from 2004 to 2008
