= Tom Becka =

American talk radio personality

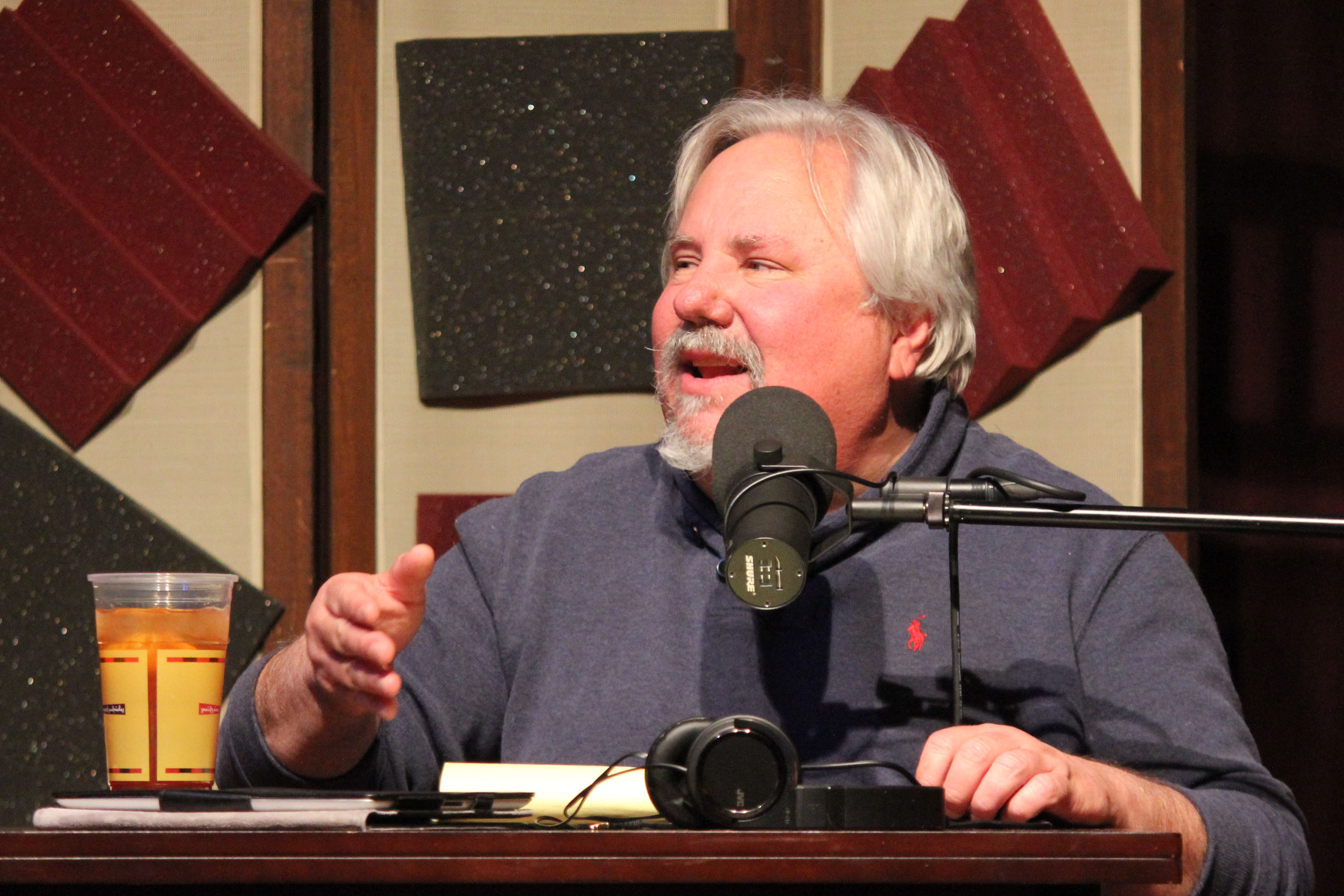
Tom Becka at the Pizza Shoppe in Benson, Omaha, Nebraska.

Tom Becka (born 1955) is an American talk radio personality who has hosted shows on KMBZ and KCMO in Kansas City, and KFAB and KOIL in Omaha as well as a short-lived stint at KRWK in Fargo, North Dakota. Before his career as a talk show host, Tom spent five years on the road as a stand-up comic.
