= 1290 AM =

AM radio frequency

The following radio stations broadcast on AM frequency 1290 kHz: 1290 AM is a Regional broadcast frequency

== In Argentina ==
- Interactiva in Ciudad Madero
- LRI371 Amanecer in Reconquista, Santa Fe
- LRJ212 Murialdo in Guaymallén, Mendoza
- Provinciana in San Miguel

== In Canada ==
Call sign	City of license	Daytime power (kW)	Nighttime power (kW)	Transmitter coordinates
CFRW	Winnipeg, Manitoba	10	10	49.7994°N 97.275°W
CJBK	London, Ontario	10	10	42.8708°N 81.0669°W

== In Mexico ==
- XEDA-AM in La Magdalena Atlazol, DF
- XEIX-AM in Jiquilpan, Michoacán

== In the United States ==
Call sign	City of license	Facility ID	Class	Daytime power (kW)	Nighttime power (kW)	Transmitter coordinates
KALM	Thayer, Missouri	51106	D	1	0.056	36.556389°N 91.551389°W
KAZA	Gilroy, California	54572	D	1.5	0.019	37.163333°N 121.641111°W
KBMO	Benson, Minnesota	54253	D	0.33	0.024	45.318333°N 95.563333°W
KCUB	Tucson, Arizona	56051	B	1	1	32.276944°N 110.980556°W
KDMS	El Dorado, Arkansas	19089	D	0.5	0.12	33.237222°N 92.665°W
KGVO	Missoula, Montana	71751	B	5	5	46.829722°N 114.079167°W
KIVY	Crockett, Texas	66253	B	2.5	0.175	31.305556°N 95.451667°W
KKDD	San Bernardino, California	10134	B	5	5	34.124167°N 117.237222°W
KMMM	Pratt, Kansas	37126	B	5	0.5	37.642778°N 98.6775°W
KOIL	Omaha, Nebraska	542	B	5	5	41.188889°N 96.005833°W
KOUU	Pocatello, Idaho	28255	D	50	0.024	42.9575°N 112.429444°W (nighttime); 42.957778°N 112.429444°W (nighttime)
KOWB	Laramie, Wyoming	24700	B	5	1	41.283333°N 105.581389°W
KPAY	Chico, California	22975	B	5	5	39.710556°N 121.787778°W
KRGE	Weslaco, Texas	11081	B	5	5	26.21°N 97.909167°W
KUMA	Pendleton, Oregon	57756	B	5	5	45.673611°N 118.746667°W
KUOA	Siloam Springs, Arkansas	35729	D	5	0.031	36.191111°N 94.566111°W
KWFS	Wichita Falls, Texas	6639	D	5	0.073	33.960556°N 98.561667°W
KZSB	Santa Barbara, California	57731	D	0.5	0.122	34.418611°N 119.686111°W
WBTG	Sheffield, Alabama	60607	D	1	0.079	34.774167°N 87.670556°W
WCBL	Benton, Kentucky	53943	D	5	0.053	36.858611°N 88.336389°W
WCHK	Canton, Georgia	10694	B	10	0.5	34.252222°N 84.463611°W
WDZY	Colonial Heights, Virginia	21723	D	25	0.041	37.258333°N 77.394444°W
WFBG	Altoona, Pennsylvania	38269	B	5	1	40.455556°N 78.397222°W
WHIO	Dayton, Ohio	14244	B	5	5	39.678889°N 84.130278°W
WHKY	Hickory, North Carolina	65918	B	50	1	35.726389°N 81.300556°W
WIRL	Peoria, Illinois	13040	B	5	5	40.623333°N 89.590833°W
WJBI	Batesville, Mississippi	4050	D	0.73	0.091	34.303611°N 89.983056°W
WJCV	Jacksonville, North Carolina	8183	D	5	0.047	34.766111°N 77.391111°W
WJNO	West Palm Beach, Florida	1917	B	10	4.9	26.763889°N 80.204722°W
WKBK	Keene, New Hampshire	36833	B	5	5	42.946111°N 72.309167°W
WKLB	Manchester, Kentucky	3964	D	5	0.034	37.1375°N 83.780556°W
WKLJ	Sparta, Wisconsin	61681	D	5	0.059	43.968333°N 90.859722°W
WLBY	Saline, Michigan	41081	D	0.5	0.026	42.204722°N 83.788611°W
WLYV	Bellaire, Ohio	3038	D	1	0.033	40.035833°N 80.771111°W
WNBF	Binghamton, New York	72372	B	9.3	5	42.058056°N 75.954167°W
WNIL	Niles, Michigan	48912	D	0.5	0.044	41.822778°N 86.284167°W
WNWW	West Hartford, Connecticut	25073	D	0.49	0.011	41.796667°N 72.797222°W
WPCF	Panama City Beach, Florida	13012	D	0.27	0.055	30.178889°N 85.781944°W
WPVD	Providence, Rhode Island	48308	D	0.4	0.016	41.855833°N 71.444722°W
WRJM	Greenfield, Wisconsin	63597	B	5	5	42.919722°N 87.988056°W
WTKS	Savannah, Georgia	8589	B	5.3	5	32.089167°N 81.146111°W
WTYL	Tylertown, Mississippi	68657	D	1		31.130556°N 90.136944°W
WVOW	Logan, West Virginia	38268	B	5	1	37.856111°N 81.971944°W
WWHM	Sumter, South Carolina	43833	D	1	0.012	33.923889°N 80.286667°W
WWTX	Wilmington, Delaware	14373	D	2.5	0.032	39.734167°N 75.528889°W
WXKL	Sanford, North Carolina	72127	D	1	0.04	35.450278°N 79.158333°W
WYEA	Sylacauga, Alabama	70638	D	1	0.05	33.195278°N 86.233889°W

== In Uruguay ==
- CX 38 Emisora del Sur in Montevideo
