= Nebraska Educational Tower Holdrege =

High guyed TV mast

Coordinates: 40°23′5″N 99°27′32″W

The Nebraska Educational Tower Holdrege is a 1,066 ft (324.8 m) high guyed TV mast in Holdrege, Nebraska, USA. It is the transmission site for Nebraska Educational Telecommunications stations KLNE-TV and KLNE-FM, both licensed to Lexington.

The tower was built in 1965, but destroyed on November 27, 2005, after an aircraft collision. The tower was rebuilt on June 15, 2007.

== See also ==
- List of masts
