= KZOT =

- Bellevue, Nebraska; United States
- Broadcast area: Omaha metropolitan area
- Frequency: 1180 kHz
- Branding: Yacht Rock 1180

Programming
- Format: Soft rock

Ownership
- Owner: Usher Media Group; (Usher Media of Omaha, LLC)
- Sister stations: KOIL; KOPW; KOZN; KQKQ-FM

History
- First air date: April 26, 1989
- Former call signs: KNPE (1984–1987); KKAR (1987–1993); KOIL (1993–2003); KYDZ (2003–2009); KOIL (2009–2012)
- Call sign meaning: Zone Two (former branding)

Technical information
- Licensing authority: FCC
- Facility ID: 43237
- Class: B
- Power: 25,000 watts (day); 1,000 watts (night)
- Transmitter coordinates: 41°16′12.00″N 95°47′10.00″W

Links
- Public license information: Public file; LMS
- Webcast: Listen live
- Website: yachtrock1180.com

KZOT (1180 AM, "Yacht Rock 1180") is a radio station licensed to serve Bellevue, Nebraska, owned by Usher Media Group. It airs a soft rock format.

KZOT's studios are located at 50th Avenue and Dodge Street in Midtown Omaha. By day, KZOT transmits with 25,000 watts. Because 1180 AM is a clear channel frequency, with primary station WHAM Rochester, New York, KZOT must reduce power at night to 1,000 watts to avoid interference. It uses a directional antenna with a four-tower array. Its transmitter site is on Sunnydale Road in Council Bluffs, Iowa, near Interstate 80.

== History ==
This station received its original construction permit from the Federal Communications Commission (FCC) on May 21, 1984, for a new station licensed to Bellevue, Nebraska and transmitting on 1180 kHz. The new station was assigned the callsigns KNPE on August 15. On January 22, 1987, while still under construction, the station was granted the call sign KKAR. After several extensions, two transfers, and a permit renewal, Mitchell Broadcasting Company received a license to cover KKAR's operation on April 26, 1989.

In September 1990, the station applied for an increase in daytime power to 25,000 watts, and the construction permit was granted in February 1991. On August 24, 1993, the station was assigned its first use of the KOIL callsigns, a heritage Omaha broadcast call sign that dates back to 1925, in a swap with the original KOIL, which became KKAR.

=== Expanded Band assignment ===
On March 17, 1997, the FCC announced that 88 stations had been given permission to move to newly available "Expanded Band" transmitting frequencies, ranging from 1610 to 1700 kHz, with KOIL authorized to move from 1180 to 1620 kHz. A construction permit for the expanded band station, also located in Bellevue, was assigned the call letters KAZP (now KOZN) on January 9, 1998. The new station began operating in September 1999.

The FCC's initial policy was that both the original station and its expanded band counterpart could operate simultaneously for up to five years, after which owners would have to turn in one of the two licenses, depending on whether they preferred the new assignment or elected to remain on the original frequency. However, this deadline has been extended multiple times, and operations have remained authorized on both 1180 and 1620 kHz. One restriction is that the FCC has generally required paired original and expanded band stations to remain under common ownership.

=== Later history ===
After a lengthy series of extensions, on June 23, 1998, KOIL was licensed to operate at the increased daytime power of 25,000 watts on 1180 kHz. In August 1999, the station dropped its sports radio programming to become a full-time affiliate of Radio Disney, and the station began broadcasting in C-QUAM AM stereo. Unfortunately, it was short-lived, and the station stopped broadcasting in AM stereo due to technical problems.

In April 2000, Mitchell Broadcasting Company, Inc. applied to transfer KOIL's license to JCM Broadcasting Co., LLC (John C. Mitchell, president). The deal was approved by the FCC on May 19, and the transaction consummated on July 5. In December 2001, an agreement was reached to sell the station to Waitt Radio, Inc. (Norman W. Waitt Jr., chairman) as part of a 16-station deal valued at $36.6 million. The transaction was approved by the FCC on February 26, 2002, and was consummated on March 5.

On April 22, 2003, the station was assigned the call sign KYDZ to better match its status as the local Radio Disney affiliate. The KOIL call sign was moved to sister station KKSC (now KMMQ).

In 2005, the entire Waitt Radio station group, including KYDZ, was transferred to NRG Media, also owned by Norman W. Waitt Jr.

In June 2006, the station's format was flipped to Spanish classic hits, including a blend of Mexican and other Latin American music from the 1970s and 1980s, and given the on-air branding "La Bonita."

On January 1, 2009, the station returned to the historic KOIL call sign as the format flipped to syndicated news/talk. As a news/talk station, notable syndicated programming on KOIL included Morning in America hosted by Bill Bennett, plus syndicated talk shows hosted by Neal Boortz, Clark Howard, Dennis Miller, Dave Ramsey, Rusty Humphries, Lars Larson, and Mike Gallagher.

In June 2012, the station flipped to sports as KZOT, The Zone 2 (with the KOIL call letters concurrently moving back to 1290). The station was positioned as a companion to KOZN The Zone, carrying CBS Sports Radio and syndicated programs such as The Dan Patrick Show, and airing Creighton Bluejays baseball, women's basketball, and women's volleyball, the Kansas City Royals, and the Omaha Storm Chasers—the Royals' Triple-A affiliate.

On November 23, 2025, KZOT dropped its sports format and began stunting with Christmas music as Santa Baby 1180. At midnight on January 2, 2026, KZOT flipped to a soft rock format as Yacht Rock 1180. The station is a spin-off of the yacht rock-centric weekend programming on sister station KOOO, with that station's "Captain" Crash Davis morning show moving to KZOT in the process.
