= KFAB =

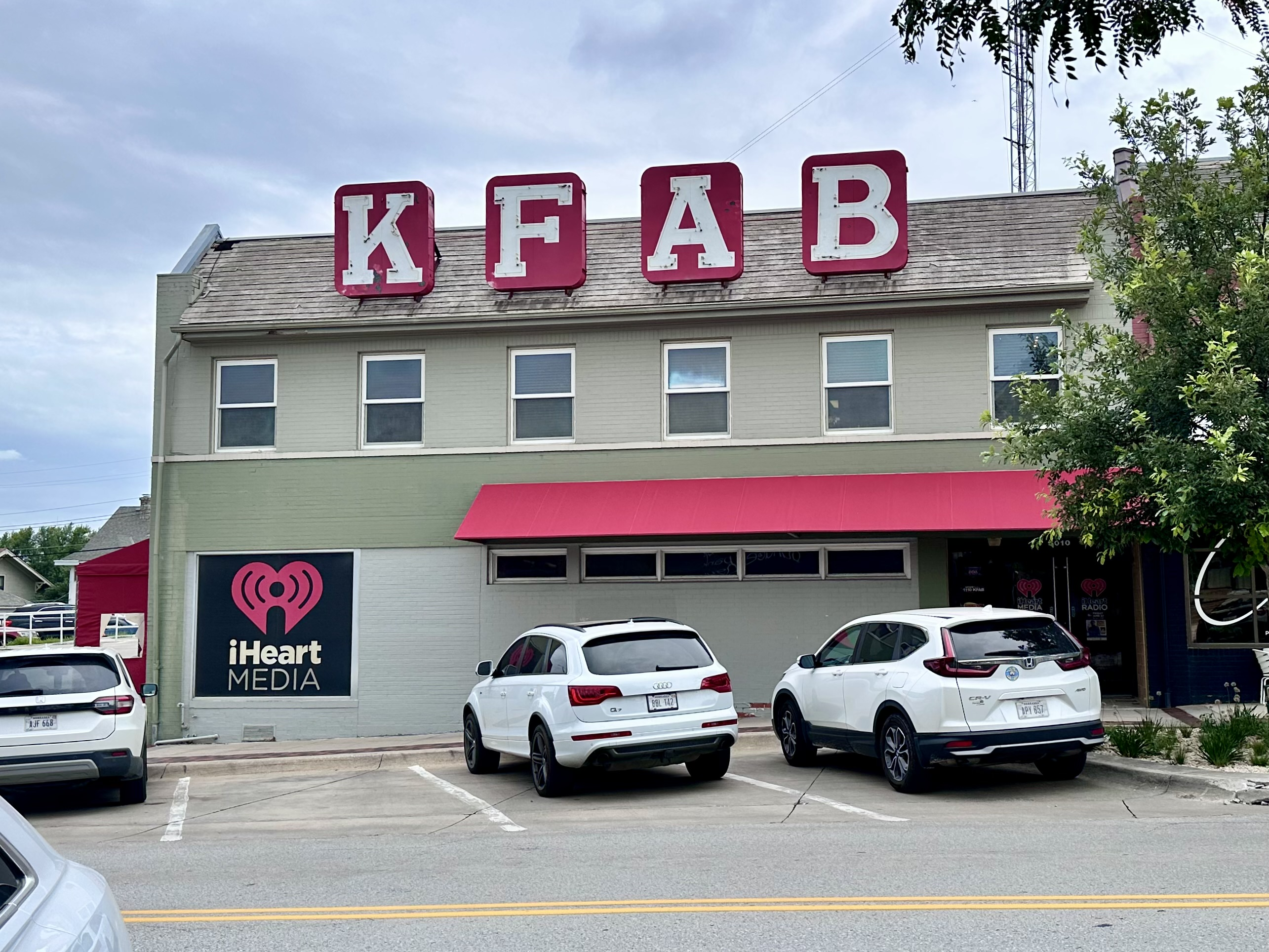
- KFAB headquarters in Dundee
- Omaha, Nebraska; United States
- Broadcast area: Omaha–Council Bluffs metropolitan area; Lincoln metropolitan area
- Frequency: 1110 kHz
- Branding: NewsRadio 1110 KFAB

Programming
- Language: English
- Format: News/talk
- Affiliations: Fox News Radio; Premiere Networks; Radio America

Ownership
- Owner: iHeartMedia; (iHM Licenses, LLC)
- Sister stations: KFFF; KGOR; KISO; KXKT

History
- First air date: December 4, 1924 (in Lincoln, moved to Omaha in 1948)
- Call sign meaning: "Keep Following A Buick" (Original owner was a Buick automobile dealer)

Technical information
- Licensing authority: FCC
- Facility ID: 26931
- Class: A
- Power: 50,000 watts
- Transmitter coordinates: 41°7′11″N 96°0′6″W

Links
- Public license information: Public file; LMS
- Webcast: Listen live (via iHeartRadio)
- Website: kfab.iheart.com

KFAB (1110 kHz) is a commercial AM radio station in Omaha, Nebraska, with studios and offices on Underwood Avenue in Omaha. It broadcasts a news/talk radio format and is owned by iHeartMedia.

KFAB is a Class A clear channel station, operating at 50,000 watts, the maximum power for commercial AM stations, from a transmitter on South 60th Street at Capehart Road in Papillion. A single tower beams the full power during the day. At night, power is fed to a three-tower array in a directional pattern to avoid interfering with WBT Charlotte, the other Class A station on 1110 AM. Due to its high power and Nebraska's excellent ground conductivity, KFAB's daytime signal is heard in most of Eastern Nebraska and Western Iowa, with at least grade B coverage as far as Kansas City, Topeka, Sioux City and Des Moines. At night, even though it must direct its signal north–south to protect WBT, it can be heard across most of the western half of North America with a good radio.

KFAB is licensed by the U.S. Federal Communications Commission to broadcast in the HD Radio (hybrid) format.

== Programming ==
Gary Sadlemyer, with KFAB for more than four decades, hosts "The KFAB Morning News" on weekdays. Local talk shows are heard in late mornings with Scott Voorhees and in late afternoons with Emery Songer. The rest of the weekday schedule is nationally syndicated conservative talk shows from co-owned Premiere Networks: The Clay Travis and Buck Sexton Show, The Glenn Beck Radio Program, The Jesse Kelly Show and Coast to Coast AM with George Noory. One popular Premiere Networks program that isn't heard on KFAB is The Sean Hannity Show. Rival talk station KOIL 1290 AM carries Hannity.

Weekends feature shows on health, money, technology, gardening and cooking. Weekend syndicated programs include The Dana Loesch Show, Armstrong & Getty, The Weekend with Michael Brown, Sunday Night with Bill Cunningham, Somewhere in Time with Art Bell and Our American Stories with Lee Habeeb. Most hours begin with an update from Fox News Radio.

== History ==
=== Early years in Lincoln ===
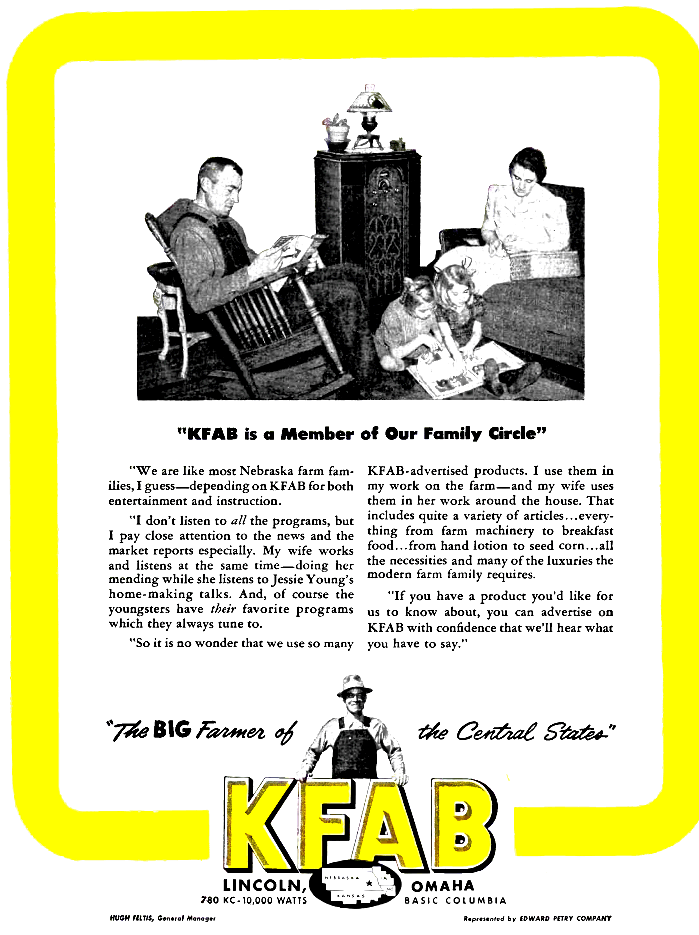
1944 station advertisement.

Just before signing on, the station received its license on November 8, 1924. It was owned by the Nebraska Buick Auto Company in Lincoln. Initially, it was given the call sign KFRR from an alphabetic list maintained by the United States Department of Commerce. However, Nebraska Buick's owner Harold E. Sidles made a request to Washington prior to the station's December 4 debut. He asked for the call letters KFAB, reportedly standing for "Keep Following A Buick".

On November 11, 1928, under the provisions of the Federal Radio Commission's General Order 40, KFAB was reassigned to a "clear channel" frequency of 770 kilocycles. In a shared-time arrangement, it could broadcast unlimited hours during the day but had to divide nighttime operations with Chicago's co-channel WBBM.

KFAB was originally aired NBC Red Network programs. But it became a CBS Radio Network affiliate the week of January 5, 1932. Beginning in 1934, KFAB and WBBM synchronized their transmissions via a telephone line that ran from the WBBM transmitter outside Chicago to the KFAB site near Lincoln, thus allowing simultaneous nighttime operation and providing a nearly coast-to-coast CBS signal on their shared frequency. In March 1941, as part of the implementation of the North American Regional Broadcasting Agreement (NARBA), KFAB and WBBM were shifted to 780 kilocycles.

=== Move to Omaha ===
In 1944, KFAB moved to 1110 kHz, giving WBBM unlimited use of 780 kHz. WJAG in Norfolk, Nebraska was concerned that KFAB's operation on 1110 kHz would cause interference to its signal on 1090 kHz, so KFAB's owners paid the cost of moving WJAG to KFAB's former frequency of 780 kHz.

KFAB relocated to Omaha as part of the frequency swap, originally with 10,000 watts, allowing it to still be heard at city-grade strength in Lincoln. It switched to a directional nighttime pattern to limit interference to WBT in Charlotte, North Carolina. WBT had previously operated full time with a non-directional antenna, and, concurrent with KFAB's reassignment to 1110 kHz, implemented a nighttime directional pattern in order to jointly protect KFAB's signal, with both stations primarily directing their nighttime signals north–south. A few years after moving to Omaha KFAB increased its power to 50,000 watts, allowing it to be heard across much of the western half of the continent at night. However, much of the Iowa side of the market only gets secondary coverage at night due to the need to protect WBT.

From its beginning KFAB has delivered a wide variety of programming, including news, weather, sports and farming reports. It became Nebraska's first 24-hour radio station in 1951. In the 1960s and 1970s, legendary newscaster Walt Kavanagh became famous for his school closing announcements during bad weather. The parents of nearly every school aged child in the area would listen intently as Kavanagh reported which districts were cancelled and which were not on snowy mornings.

In 1948, while still an undergraduate at the University of Nebraska, Johnny Carson worked at KFAB writing and doing shows. In addition to Carson, KFAB was and continues to be the home of some of the state's most popular personalities, including Lyell "Mr. Football" Bremser, Ken Hedrick, John Coleman, Walt Kavanagh, "Texas" Mary, Gary Sadlemyer, Kent Pavelka and Jim Rose, most if not all have been inducted into the Nebraska Broadcasters Hall of Fame.

=== Cornhuskers ===
For most of the time from its earliest days until the 1990s, KFAB dominated the Omaha market. From 1926 to 2015—except for a short break from 1996 to 2001—KFAB was the home of Nebraska Cornhuskers sports. After 1948, it shared flagship status with Lincoln's KOLN/KLIN. However, in February 2015, the Cornhuskers moved their games to WOW (signed at the time as KXSP).

University officials had been disappointed KFAB was not willing to air more than football and men's basketball games. For instance, volleyball and women's basketball games were shunted to KFFF, while baseball games had no radio home. School officials wanted to ensure that all Cornhusker sports would air on a single, powerful station. WOW's daytime coverage is roughly comparable to that of KFAB. Even with the loss of the Huskers, KFAB continued to be one of the highest rated stations in the Omaha/Council Bluffs market. It also retained substantial listenership in Lincoln despite being an out-of-market station.

=== Ownership changes ===
From the 1950s through the 1980s, KFAB was owned by the Seacrest family alongside the Lincoln Journal, now part of the Lincoln Journal Star. In 1959, it added an FM station, KFAB-FM (99.9 FM). At first, KFAB-FM largely simulcast KFAB; in the late 1960s, it switched to beautiful music and later became automated adult contemporary KGOR. On March 19, 1984, KFAB became the first Omaha market to broadcast using AM stereo technology. In 2000, Clear Channel Communications acquired KFAB and KGOR. Clear Channel later changed its name to iHeartMedia, Inc.

In 2005, KFAB became the first Nebraska radio station to broadcast using HD radio technology.
