= WXKL =

- Sanford, North Carolina; United States
- Frequency: 1290 kHz

Programming
- Format: Urban Gospel

Ownership
- Owner: Mary and Mark Dangerfield; (Macadell & Associates, Inc.)

Technical information
- Licensing authority: FCC
- Class: D
- Power: 1,000 watts day 40 watts night
- Transmitter coordinates: 35°27′01″N 79°09′30″W

Links
- Public license information: Public file; LMS
- Website: wxkl1290.com/about

WXKL (1290 AM) is a radio station broadcasting an Urban Gospel radio format. It is licensed to Sanford, North Carolina, and is owned by Mary and Mark Dangerfield, through licensee Macadell & Associates, Inc.

By day, WXKL is powered at 1,000 watts. But to protect other stations on 1290 AM from interference, at night it reduces power to 40 watts. It uses a non-directional antenna.

== History ==
WXKL originally signed on the air on October 2, 1952 as WEYE 1290AM with 1000 watts of power. WEYE operated with 500 watts pre-Sunrise Authority and at sunrise raised power to 1000 watts, and signed off at sunset. The station was first licensed through Waldo W. Primm—after his sale of WWGP, Sanford—and a local investment partner. The WEYE tower and studio were first located on old Spring Lane, now developed with shopping center and custom residences. (Mr. Primm resigned in mid-1950s and moved to Durham, NC, where he became chief engineer for WDNC and engineer for the Duke football network.) The origins of its early programs are unknown, until the early 1960s, when it played top 40 music. Jerry M. Farmer was one of the early station managers and morning hosts. Farmer also was news director and a top salesman of commercial advertising. In 1964, the studios of WEYE moved to the Kendale Shopping Center in Jonesboro Heights Sanford. This move enabled the general populace to look in from street level to the on-air personalities at work. In 1973, WEYE moved to 1819 Lee Avenue.

As time progressed through the 1960s into the 1970s, Jerry M. Farmer left WEYE to teach Radio Television Broadcasting with Central Carolina Technical Institute in Sanford from 1970 to 1997. On December 23, 2013, Jerry Farmer died at the age of 78. He was followed at WEYE by such air personalities as: Ted Harris, Bill Medlin, Frank Parks, Danny Davis, Bruce Strickland, Mike Dennis, and Steve Stevens. WEYE aired "BINGO" in the late 1960s from 10-10:30 AM, hosted by Jerry Farmer. In the 1970s, "Swap Shop", a buy and sell program aired from 10:30-11 AM. In 1976, WEYE began to compete with cross town rival, WWGP, in the area of local news. WEYE hired Lou Merrit, a graduate of Central Carolina Technical Institute's Radio-TV Program. Lou worked local news from 1976–1978, before moving to WFJA-FM sister station of cross town rival, WWGP.

Managers of WEYE were Larry Newcomb, Joe Tucker, Gary Dumars, Bob Manning, and Ken Burch. In 1979, WEYE was sold to Lamar Simmons of Lillington and the call letters were changed to WSBL, later WXKL. Simmons changed the format from top 40 to country music. In the 1960s and 1970s, WEYE carried ABC Contemporary Network News at 54:30 past the hour. Also they carried ABC Sports which allowed them to carry Howard Cosell Comments. When Simmons owned the station, he dropped ABC News and carried news from the North Carolina News Network at 55 past the hour. Simmons sold WXKL to Dr. Samuel David Ciliberto and his wife Betty in the 1980s. The format was changed to Southern Gospel Music and the studios moved to their home, vacating the 1819 Lee Avenue location. In the 1990s, Dr. Ciliberto sold the station to Rev. James Thomas. Rev. Thomas became owner of WXKL in November 1994. Rev. Thomas still operates WXKL playing primarily African American Gospel Music, both live and recorded. Today, WXKL, after a couple of studio move locations, has its studios at 1516 Woodland Avenue in Sanford, NC. Rev. James Thomas lived well into his eighth decade of life and will be remembered as a prominent African American broadcaster in not only Lee County but in the great state of North Carolina. Rev. Thomas died in February 2011.

On January 30, 2013, Rev. Thomas' estate sold the station to Jimmy Johnson's Johnson Broadcast Ventures, Ltd. at a purchase price of $26,000. The transaction was consummated on March 1, 2013.

Later in 2013, Johnson sold WXKL to Mary and Mark Dangerfield's Macadell & Associates, Inc. at a purchase price of $65,000. That transaction was consummated on August 15, 2013.
