= Nebraska Public Media =

Public broadcaster in Nebraska

- statewide Nebraska; United States
- Channels: Digital: see table below

Programming
- Affiliations: Television: PBS (1970–present); APT; Radio: NPR (1989–present); PRX; APM

Ownership
- Owner: KUON: University of Nebraska–Lincoln; Others: Nebraska Educational Telecommunications Commission

History
- First air date: November 1, 1954 (television); October 10, 1989 (radio); 1965 (Statewide network launch)
- Former call signs: NET
- Former affiliations: Television: NET (1954–1970)
- Call sign meaning: all stations, except University of Nebraska as Lincoln affiliate: 2nd letter: see table below Nebraska

Technical information
- Facility ID: see table below
- ERP: see table below
- HAAT: see table below
- Transmitter coordinates: see table below

Links
- Website: nebraskapublicmedia.org

Nebraska Public Media (NPM), formerly Nebraska Educational Telecommunications (NET), is a state network of public radio and television stations in the U.S. state of Nebraska. It is operated by the Nebraska Educational Telecommunications Commission (NETC). The television stations are all members of the Public Broadcasting Service (PBS), while the radio stations are members of National Public Radio (NPR).

The network is headquartered in the Terry M. Carpenter & Jack G. McBride Nebraska Public Media Center on North 33rd Street on the East Campus of the University of Nebraska–Lincoln in Lincoln, and has a satellite studio inside Suite 200 of the College of Public Affairs and Community Service (CPACS) Building on the campus of the University of Nebraska Omaha on Dodge Street in Omaha.

== History ==
=== Television ===
Nebraska was one of the first states in the nation to begin the groundwork for educational broadcasting. The University of Nebraska successfully applied to have channel 18 in Lincoln allocated for educational use in 1951.

Meanwhile, broadcasting pioneer John Fetzer purchased Lincoln's two commercial TV stations, KOLN-TV (channel 12) in August 1953 and KFOR-TV (channel 10) in February 1954. In order to avoid running afoul of Federal Communications Commission (FCC) ownership regulations and to create a commercial broadcast monopoly for himself in the Lincoln market, Fetzer moved KOLN from its sign-on channel 12 to KFOR's channel 10 and offered to donate the channel 12 license to UNL. Since this would allow UNL to use more signal at less cost, the school quickly jumped at this proposal. KUON-TV went on the air on November 1, 1954, from KOLN-TV's studios, where the stations had to take turns using studio space; when KOLN was live, KUON had to broadcast a film, and vice versa. The station joined the nascent National Educational Television network (which had begun operations in May) upon its sign-on. It was operated in trust for UNL until 1956, when the FCC granted the channel 12 license to the school's Board of Regents. In 1957, KUON moved to its own studios in the Temple Building on the UNL campus. In 1960, the Nebraska Council for Educational Television was created by six school districts in Nebraska. By 1961, five VHF and three UHF channels were allocated for educational use in Nebraska—the largest set ever approved for educational use in a single state. In 1963, the state legislature, per a committee's recommendation, approved plans for a statewide NETC-controlled educational television network on the model of Alabama Educational Television. A deal was quickly reached in which Lincoln's KUON-TV would remain under UNL's ownership, but serve as the new network's flagship.

In 1965, KLNE-TV in Lexington became the first station in the new state network, followed a month later (October 1965) by KYNE-TV in Omaha. The network grew quickly; six stations signed on from 1966 to 1968. It began a full seven-day schedule in 1969. The Nebraska Educational Telecommunications Center opened in 1972; it is named for Carpenter, a state senator who introduced legislation in 1969 to fund the center, and McBride, NET's founding general manager for 43 years. (The KLNE-TV and KLNE-FM transmission tower (40.3848101°N 99.4588698°W) is on the site of the World War II prisoner-of-war camp, Camp Atlanta, near Holdrege, Nebraska.) National Educational Television would be absorbed into the Public Broadcasting Service (PBS) in October 1970, and the stations joined the new network.

Nebraska ETV Network logo used from 1975 to 1976. The basic design of this logo would be adopted by NBC in January 1976, prompting a lawsuit.

On June 8, 1975, the network's statewide affiliates would formally adopt the "Nebraska ETV Network" name alongside a new unifying logo—a red stylized abstract "N" formed from two trapezoids, designed by art director William E. "Bill" Korbus. In October of the same year, NBC unveiled a new identity designed by Lippincott & Margulies set to launch at the start of 1976; its centerpiece being a new "N" mark identical to that of Nebraska ETV save for its red-and-blue coloring. Local press began to cover the commission's response to the similarity within the week of NBC adopting the symbol, with the commission moving to sue the network for trademark infringement in February 1976, garnering national press attention. In an out-of-court settlement, NBC donated a color mobile unit and other equipment totaling over $800,000 to Nebraska ETV, alongside an additional $55,000 for the costs of designing and implementing a new logo in exchange for the continued use of the stylized "N" for itself.

Nebraska ETV discontinued its use of the logo in the midst of the dispute, using a plain-text placeholder from April 1, 1976, until its replacement was unveiled on May 25. The new logo, a geometric lowercase "n", was designed by Michael "Mike" Buettner, an employee of the network's art department under the direction of Bill Korbus. Due to mixed reception to the symbol outside of this controversy, NBC would update their N in 1979 by adding a modernized peacock symbol to the center, phasing it out entirely by 1986 for the present-day six-feathered peacock.

Since 1974, NET has operated a studio in Omaha, on the campus of the University of Nebraska Omaha. It is primarily used when KYNE breaks off from the network to broadcast programming of specific interest to the Omaha market.

A CPB study, Study of School Use of Television and Video, found Reading Rainbow (a co-production of NET and Buffalo, New York's WNED-TV until 2006) to be the most used and viewed children's television program in America during the 1990–1991 school year.

In January 2005, Nebraska ETV and Nebraska Public Radio were united under a single name, Nebraska Educational Telecommunications.

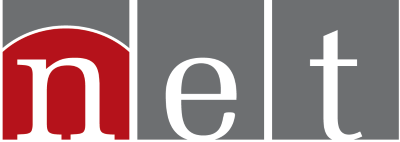
Last logo as NET, used from January 2005 until May 14, 2021.

In May 2021, NET changed its name to Nebraska Public Media to more accurately represent the organization's entire impact.

=== Radio ===
The Educational Television Commission had its mission broadened to radio in 1986, but it was 1989 before it could begin the groundwork for building a statewide public radio network. For many years, there were only two NPR members in the entire state—Omaha's KIOS and Lincoln's KUCV, which had signed on in 1974. In 1989, however, UNL bought KUCV from Union College. KUCV officially relaunched from its new studios on October 10, 1989. In 2001, KUCV moved from 90.9 FM (where it had been since 1980) to 91.1.

In 1990, the commission opened stations in Alliance, Lexington, Columbus, Norfolk, and Hastings. North Platte, Bassett, Merriman, and Chadron followed in 1991. The entire Nebraska Public Radio Network (NPRN) was formally dedicated on October 8 in a special ceremony, broadcast live on NPRN and NETV.

Last logo as NET Radio affiliated with NPR, used in January 2005 until May 14, 2021.

The Nebraska Educational Telecommunications Facilities Corporation was established to facilitate lease/purchase of the GTE SpaceNet 3 transponder.

On February 2, 2026, as part of NRG Media selling their Omaha stations to Usher Media Group, Nebraska Public Media announced that it would acquire KOOO from NRG for $1.2 million. Upon the completion of the sale on May 13, 2026, KOOO flipped to a hybrid news/talk and adult album alternative format.

== Television stations ==
Nebraska Public Media consists of nine full-power TV stations that make up the network; all stations have callsigns beginning with the letter K, as licensed by the Federal Communications Commission (FCC), and ending in NE (the postal abbreviation for Nebraska) except "UON" (University of Nebraska) for the Lincoln station. Combined, they reach almost all of Nebraska, as well as parts of Colorado, Iowa, Kansas, Missouri, South Dakota, and Wyoming. Eight of the stations are owned by the NETC. Flagship station KUON is owned by the University of Nebraska–Lincoln, but is operated by the Commission through a long-standing agreement between the Commission and NU.

Station	City of license	Channel; TV (RF)	Facility ID	ERP	HAAT	Call sign meaning	Transmitter coordinates	First air date	Public license information
KTNE-TV	Alliance	13 (13)	47996	27 kW	466 m (1,529 ft)	Television Nebraska	41°50′27″N 103°3′18″W	September 7, 1966	Public file LMS
KMNE-TV	Bassett	7 (7)	47981	27 kW	453 m (1,486 ft)	Middle Nebraska	42°20′5″N 99°29′2″W	September 1, 1967	Public file LMS
KHNE-TV	Hastings	29 (28)	47987	200 kW	366 m (1,201 ft)	Hastings, Nebraska	40°46′20″N 98°5′21″W	November 18, 1968	Public file LMS
KLNE-TV	Lexington	3 (26)	47975	375 kW	331 m (1,086 ft)	Lexington, Nebraska	40°23′5″N 99°27′30″W (Note: Site of the Nebraska Educational Tower Holdrege.)	September 6, 1965	Public file LMS
KUON-TV	Lincoln	12 (27)	66589	680 kW	245 m (804 ft)	University of Nebraska–Lincoln	41°8′18″N 96°27′21″W	November 1, 1954 (Note: KUON-TV launched on February 18, 1953, as KOLN-TV, changed its callsign to KUON on August 5, 1954, and added the -TV suffix to its callsign on November 1, 1954.)	Public file LMS
KRNE-TV	Merriman	12 (12)	47971	75 kW	322 m (1,056 ft)	Merriman, Nebraska	42°40′37″N 101°42′39″W	December 9, 1968	Public file LMS
KXNE-TV	Norfolk	19 (19)	47995	475 kW	253.2 m (831 ft)	Across Nebraska	42°14′15″N 97°16′41″W	November 10, 1967	Public file LMS
KPNE-TV	North Platte	9 (9)	47973	85 kW	334 m (1,096 ft)	North Platte, Nebraska	41°1′22″N 101°9′14″W	September 12, 1966	Public file LMS
KYNE-TV (Note: KYNE occasionally breaks off from the Nebraska Public Media state network to broadcast local programming. KYNE's programming became digital-only on February 17, 2009.)	Omaha	26 (17)	47974	21.5 kW	283.6 m (930 ft)	Your Nebraska	41°18′32″N 96°1′34.2″W	October 19, 1965	Public file LMS

=== Translators ===
Nebraska Public Media operates 15 translators to widen its coverage area. Four repeat KUON, four repeat KXNE, three repeat KTNE, three repeat KPNE, and one repeats KMNE.

Station	City of license	Channel	Parent station	Facility ID
K23AA	Beatrice	23	KUON	47983
K24GO	Blair	24	KUON	47969
K31OC-D	Broken Bow	7	KMNE	181534
K06JC	Chadron	6	KTNE	47977
K06KR	Crawford	6	KTNE	47991
K34IB	Decatur	34	KXNE	47976
K25OG-D	Falls City	25	KUON	47970
K08LN	Harrison	8	KTNE	47992
K33FO	Max	33	KPNE	48009
K21OI-D	McCook/Culbertson	9	KPNE	47954
K27NI-D	Neligh	27	KXNE	47985
K14MI	Niobrara	14	KXNE	47988
K33AC	Pawnee City	33	KUON	47993
K10JW-D	Verdigre	19	KXNE	47989
K20IJ	Wauneta	20	KPNE	47980

=== Cable and satellite availability ===
Nebraska Public Media is available on nearly all cable systems in Nebraska. Selected cable systems in northern Kansas (specifically Jewell, Phillips, Republic and Smith counties) carry Hastings' KHNE in addition to Smoky Hills PBS; these counties are part of the Hastings/Kearney side of the Lincoln/Hastings/Kearney media market. Additionally, Omaha's KYNE is carried on most cable systems in southwestern Iowa.

On satellite, KUON, KYNE, KPNE, KXNE, and KTNE are carried on the local Lincoln, Omaha, North Platte, Sioux City, and Cheyenne, Wyoming Dish Network feeds, respectively. KTNE is the sole PBS station available to satellite viewers in the Cheyenne market, due to FCC regulations that prohibit Wyoming PBS to be seen in that market, since KWYP-TV in Laramie is located in the Denver television market. KHNE, KYNE, and KXNE are available on the Lincoln, Omaha, and Sioux City DirecTV feeds, respectively.

== Technical information ==
=== Subchannels ===
The signals of Nebraska Public Media's television stations are multiplexed:

Nebraska Public Media multiplex
Subchannel	Res.	Short name	Programming
xx.1	1080i	NE-PBS	PBS
xx.2	1080i	NE-W	World
xx.3	720p	NE-C	Create
xx.4	480i	NE-KIDS	PBS Kids
xx.5	480i	NE-FNX	First Nations Experience

=== Analog-to-digital conversion ===
During 2009, in the lead-up to the analog-to-digital television transition that would ultimately occur in 2009, Nebraska Public Media shut down the analog transmitters of its stations on a staggered basis. Listed below are the dates each analog transmitter ceased operations as well as their post-transition channel allocations:

- KUON-TV shut down its analog signal, over VHF channel 12, in Autumn 2008. The station's digital signal relocated from its pre-transition UHF channel 40 to VHF channel 12.
- KHNE-TV shut down its analog signal, over UHF channel 29, on February 17, 2009, the original date on which full-power television stations in the United States were to transition from analog to digital broadcasts under federal mandate (which was later pushed back to June 12, 2009). The station's digital signal remained on its pre-transition UHF channel 28, using virtual channel 29.
- KLNE-TV shut down its analog signal, over VHF channel 3, on February 17, 2009. The station's digital signal remained on its pre-transition UHF channel 26, using virtual channel 3.
- KMNE-TV shut down its analog signal, over VHF channel 7, in autumn 2008. The station's digital signal relocated from its pre-transition UHF channel 15 to VHF channel 7.
- KPNE-TV shut down its analog signal, over VHF channel 9, in autumn 2008. The station's digital signal relocated from its pre-transition UHF channel 16 to VHF channel 9.
- KRNE-TV shut down its analog signal, over VHF channel 12, in autumn 2008. The station's digital signal relocated from its pre-transition UHF channel 17 to VHF channel 12.
- KTNE-TV shut down its analog signal, over VHF channel 13, in autumn 2008. The station's digital signal relocated from its pre-transition UHF channel 24 to VHF channel 13.
- KXNE-TV shut down its analog signal, over UHF channel 19, in November 2008. The station's digital signal relocated from its pre-transition UHF channel 16 to former UHF analog channel 19.
- KYNE-TV shut down its analog signal, over UHF channel 26, on February 17, 2009. The station's digital signal remained on its pre-transition UHF channel 17, using virtual channel 26.

== Radio stations ==
Nebraska Public Media's radio stations are governed by the NET Commission and the NET Foundation for Radio Board. It consists of all NPR member stations in the state except for KIOS and KVNO in Omaha; those stations are operated by Omaha Public Schools and the University of Nebraska Omaha respectively. The stations' combined footprint covers most of the state outside the Omaha metropolitan area, as well as parts of Iowa, South Dakota, and Kansas. KOOO offers a hybrid NPR news/talk and adult album alternative format; programming on the other 13 stations consists of classical music and NPR news and talk.

Nebraska Public Media Radio can also be heard on the FNX television channel.

There are 14 full-power stations in the state network:

Station	Frequency	City	ERP	HAAT	Callsign meaning
KUCV	91.1 FM	Lincoln (flagship)	100 kW	210 m (689 ft)	Union College (original owner) Voice
KOOO	101.9 FM	La Vista (Omaha)	96 kW	365 m (1,198 ft)	"The Big O" (former station branding)
KCNE-FM	91.9 FM	Chadron	8.4 kW	103 m (338 ft)	Chadron, Nebraska
KGNE-FM	89.3 FM	Broken Bow	12 kW	77 m (253 ft)	Greater Nebraska
KHNE-FM	89.1 FM	Hastings	68 kW	329 m (1,079 ft)	Hastings, Nebraska
KLNE-FM	88.7 FM	Lexington	65 kW	296.8 m (974 ft)	Lexington, Nebraska
KMNE-FM	90.3 FM	Bassett	100 kW	402 m (1,319 ft)	Middle Nebraska
KNNE-FM	90.7 FM	McCook	19 kW (vertical only)	95 m (312 ft)	N Nebraska
KPNE-FM	91.7 FM	North Platte	88 kW	288 m (945 ft)	North Platte, Nebraska
KQNE-FM	89.9 FM	Falls City	3.2 kW	137 m (449 ft)	Quality Radio for Nebraska
KRNE-FM	91.5 FM	Merriman	100 kW	294 m (965 ft)	Merriman, Nebraska
KTNE-FM	91.1 FM	Alliance	100 kW	404 m (1,325 ft)	Towards Nebraska
KUNE-FM	88.7 FM	Columbus	2.1 kW	211 m (692 ft)	U Nebraska
KXNE-FM	89.3 FM	Norfolk	45 kW	300 m (984 ft)	Across Nebraska

The state network also has four low-power repeater/translator signals.

Station	Frequency	City	Parent Station
K209FS	89.7 FM	Columbus	KXNE
K224CH	92.7 FM	Culbertson	KPNE
K208CB	89.5 FM	Harrison	KTNE
K227AC	93.3 FM	Max	KPNE

K209FS went off the air in July 2023 due to the dismantling of its broadcast tower. NPM is seeking a new location for the translator but ultimately will replace it with a higher-power station, KUNE-FM. Later, NPM would sell the K209FS translator to My Bridge Radio and relocate the frequency to 88.1 to allow for sign on of 89.9 KHUY Schuyler, which will also be the parent station of the new translator broadcast.

== Programming ==
Although Nebraska Public Media provides PBS programming, it also produces original programs, such as:

- Nebraska Stories
- Backyard Farmer
- Big Red Wrap Up
- Nebraska Legislation
- Consider This...
- Speaking of Nebraska
- Nebraska Cornhuskers women's volleyball
- Nebraska Cornhuskers baseball
- What If...Nebraska
- High School Bowling
- NSAA High School Championships: a series of high school girls' and boys' championships events on most Saturdays including:
  - Track and Field (3rd Friday and Saturday of May)
  - Basketball (Girls 1st Saturday of March, and Boys 2nd Saturday of March)
  - Football (Monday & Tuesday before Thanksgiving)
  - Soccer (Girls 3rd Monday of May, and Boys 3rd Tuesday of May)
  - Softball (3rd Monday of October)
  - Speech (March or April)
  - Swimming & Diving (Last Saturday of February or some 1st Saturday of March)
  - Volleyball (2nd Saturday of November)
  - Wrestling (Girls 3rd or 4th Wednesday of February and Boys 3rd or 4th Saturday of February).

== News operation ==
The Nebraska Public Media News team was led by News Director Dennis Kellogg until 2022. The news department produces regular "Signature Stories" for air on Nebraska Public Media's radio stations.
