= Backyard Farmer =

American television program

- Created by: George Round and Jack McBride (through KUON-TV)
- Country of origin: United States
- No. of seasons: 69
- No. of episodes: 1,380+

Production
- Running time: 60 minutes
- Production company: University of Nebraska–Lincoln

Original release
- Network: PBS, syndication
- Release: June 1, 1953 – present

Backyard Farmer is a cooperative television program produced by the University of Nebraska–Lincoln Extension and Nebraska Public Media. First broadcast in 1953, the show has run for more than 70 years, making it one of the longest-running programs in American television history. It airs live at 7 PM Central Time every Thursday from April through September on Nebraska Public Media.

The program's content is exclusively home lawn and gardening information with an emphasis on Nebraska flora and climate considerations. The format consists of a panel of experts, usually from Nebraska Extension, that share information and respond to viewer questions.

== Overview ==
The structure of the show consists of a host who fields viewer questions about home lawn and gardening as well as flora and fauna native to Nebraska to a panel of four specialists. The four specialists are experts in the fields of Entomology, Horticulture, Plant Pathology, and Turf Grass and Weeds. Also on the show are segments featuring a plant-of-the-week, live plant and pest samples, as well as a "Lightning Round". During the "Lightning Round" the panelists compete to answer as many viewer questions as possible during a 60-second time frame. During live shows, Backyard Farmer telephone operators field about 200 calls and 100 emails to find good questions for the panel to answer. Most viewer questions revolve around topics including soil preparation, water conservation, organic food production, landscape practices and edible landscapes.

== History ==
Backyard Farmer first aired in 1953 on Lincoln, Nebraska, station KFOR-TV, moving to NET in 1955. (The KFOR license was donated in 1954 to the University of Nebraska by John Fetzer, who also owned competing Lincoln TV station KOLN, to create NET's flagship station, KUON-TV.) The University's KUON-TV station was run out of the basement of the Temple building on campus.

Backyard Farmer was the brainchild of George Round and Jack McBride. George Round was the Director of University Relations. Jack McBride was the founder of the University of Nebraska Television Department and general manager of the Nebraska ETV Network, which consisted of nine stations.

Backyard Farmer was the fourth Nebraska ETV Network program to begin broadcasting on the KUON-TV network. Both George Round and Dwayne Trenkle were the original hosts and moderators. The show consisted of a host and four specialists.

In the 1960s, Backyard Farmer had the highest rating of any educational broadcast in the United States. The show claims to be "The longest running locally produced program in television history."

== Cast ==
=== Current cast (2026 season) ===
Kim Todd, Kait Chapman, Jody Green, Kyle Koch, Wayne Ohnesorg, Dennis Ferraro, Terri James, Amy Timmerman, Kyle Broderick, Loren Giesler, Elizabeth Exstrom, Scott Evans, Dana Freeman and Jeff Culbertson.

Phone Volunteer

Gladys Jeurink - 1977–Present

=== Specialty cast positions ===
Entomologists	Hal Ball; Bob Roselle - 1953–1980; David Keith - 1969–2004; Fred Baxendale - 1985–Present; Jim Kalisch - 1990–Present; Wayne Ohnesorg; Jody Green; Kyle Koch; Kait Chapman
Turf & Weed Specialists	John Furrer; Bob Stougaard; John MacNamara; Roch Gaussoin - 1992–Present; Anne Streich; Brady Kappler; Lowell Sandel; Zac Reicher; Terri James
Plant Pathologists	John Weihing; David Wysong - 1964–1999; John Watkins - 1976–2005; Loren Giesler - 1998–Present; Jennifer Chaky; Stephen Wegulo; Amy Timmerman; Kevin Korus; Kyle Broderick; Mike Boehm
Horticulturists	Wayne Whitney - 1953–1976; Don Steinegger - 1976–2000; John Fech - 2001–2004; Don Janssen; Kelly Feehan; Amy Greiving; Kim Todd - 2004–Present; Jeff Culbertson - 1998–Present; Sarah Browning; Elizabeth Exstrom; Dana Freeman; Scott Evans
Hosts	George Round - 1953–1975; Dwayne Trenkle; Cyril Bish; Emory Nelson; Tom Bare - 1966–1980; Craig Derscheid; Jim Randall; Peggy Lowe; Reggie Carlson - 1988–2000; John Fech - 2001–2004; Kim Todd - 2004–Present
