= KGOR =

Radio station in Omaha, Nebraska

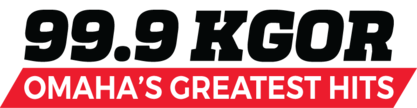
- Omaha, Nebraska; United States
- Broadcast area: Omaha metropolitan area
- Frequency: 99.9 MHz (HD Radio)
- Branding: 99.9 KGOR

Programming
- Format: Classic hits
- Subchannels: HD3: Air1
- Affiliations: Compass Media Networks; Premiere Networks

Ownership
- Owner: iHeartMedia, Inc.; (iHM Licenses, LLC)
- Sister stations: KFAB, KFFF, KISO, KXKT

History
- First air date: 1959 (as KFAB-FM)
- Former call signs: KFAB-FM (1959–1975)

Technical information
- Licensing authority: FCC
- Facility ID: 26928
- Class: C0
- ERP: 115,000 watts
- HAAT: 370 meters (1,210 ft)
- Transmitter coordinates: 41°18′24.6″N 96°1′37.7″W
- Translator: HD3: 104.9 K285GP (Millard)

Links
- Public license information: Public file; LMS
- Webcast: Listen Live; Listen Live (HD3)
- Website: kgor.iheart.com air1.com (HD3)

KGOR (99.9 FM) is a commercial radio station in Omaha, Nebraska, broadcasting a classic hits radio format. It is owned by iHeartMedia, Inc., and licensed as iHM Licenses, LLC. The radio studios and offices are at North 50th Street and Underwood Avenue in Midtown Omaha.

KGOR has an effective radiated power (ERP) of 115,000 watts, the most powerful FM station in Omaha. The transmitter is at the Omaha master antenna farm on North 72nd Street near Crown Point Avenue. KGOR is licensed by the Federal Communications Commission to broadcast using HD Radio technology. The HD3 digital subchannel airs contemporary worship music from "Air1," feeding FM translator K285GP at 104.9 MHz in Millard, Nebraska.

== History ==
=== MOR (1959-196?) ===
In 1959, KFAB-FM signed on the air. At first, it simulcasted co-owned KFAB. The two stations broadcast a middle of the road format with popular music, news and sports. From the 1950s through the 80s, KFAB-AM-FM were co-owned with the Lincoln Journal Star.

=== Beautiful music (1960s-1970s) ===
In the late 1960s, KFAB-FM broke away from the AM station. It carried a beautiful music format, featuring quarter-hour sweeps of mostly instrumental cover versions of popular music.

=== Adult contemporary (197?-1988) ===
In the 1970s, KFAB-FM switched to an automated adult contemporary format. The station changed its call sign to KGOR in 1975 to differentiate it from KFAB.

The station was the original home of the morning program Out of Bed with Jack and Fred, which premiered in 1986. It went on to be a long-running program on Omaha radio, and was the highest rated morning show for several years. Jack Swanda and Fred Brooks left KGOR for AC competitor KEFM in July 1989 due to a contract dispute.

=== Oldies (1988-2000s) ===
On November 21, 1988, KGOR flipped from AC to oldies, the first FM station in the format in Omaha. (KOIL (1290 AM) was the first all oldies station in 1986.) KGOR became one of the highest rated stations in the city, ranking in the top five in the Arbitron ratings. The format started out playing music from the 1950s-1960s, before moving to 1960s-1970s by the mid 1990s.

In 2000, KGOR and co-owned KFAB were acquired by Clear Channel Communications, the forerunner to today's iHeartMedia.

=== Classic hits (2000s-present) ===
KGOR shifted away from its "oldies" branding in the early 2000s, trying to avoid the word "Old." It started calling itself a "classic hits" station, focusing on the 1960s-1980s, mostly playing 1970s titles. By the 2010s, the playlist shifted to mostly 1980s hits, with some 70s and 90s titles included.

== HD3 translator ==
Call sign	Frequency	City of license	FID	ERP (W)	HAAT	Class	Transmitter coordinates	FCC info
K285GP	(104.9 MHz) FM	Millard, Nebraska	148229	70	308 m (1,010 ft)	D	41°18′25″N 96°1′38.1″W	LMS
