= KVNO =

Classical music public radio station in Omaha, Nebraska

- Omaha, Nebraska; United States
- Frequency: 90.7 MHz (HD Radio)

Programming
- Format: Classical music
- Subchannels: 90.7 HD1: Classical; 90.7 HD2: Student "MavRadio"; 90.7 HD3: News/talk "News Radio"

Ownership
- Owner: University of Nebraska Omaha; (The Board of Regents of the University of Nebraska)

History
- First air date: August 27, 1972
- Call sign meaning: "Voice of the University of Nebraska at Omaha"

Technical information
- Licensing authority: FCC
- Facility ID: 69395
- Class: C2
- ERP: 8,900 watts
- HAAT: 197 meters
- Transmitter coordinates: 41.307°N 96.027°W

Links
- Public license information: Public file; LMS
- Webcast: Listen Live
- Website: kvno.org

KVNO (90.7 FM) is a radio station with a classical music format in Omaha, Nebraska, United States. It is owned by the University of Nebraska Omaha (UNO) and broadcasts from studios on the university's Dodge Street campus and a transmitter facility co-sited with television station KMTV-TV. The station is a media operations unit of UNO's College of Communication, Fine Arts and Media; KVNO's broadcasting license is held by the University of Nebraska Board of Regents. HD Radio subchannels of KVNO provide feeds of MavRadio, the student-run radio station at UNO, and a subchannel primarily consisting of BBC World Service output.

A fine arts and classical music station throughout its history, KVNO began broadcasting in August 1972. Traditionally reliant on its own program productions, the station is one of two public radio outlets in Omaha proper, with KIOS-FM 91.5 providing NPR news and talk programming.

== History ==
On July 28, 1969, UNO applied to the Federal Communications Commission (FCC) for a construction permit to build a new noncommercial radio station in Omaha. By the time the application was made, the idea of an FM radio station for the university campus had been debated for several years. However, the wait was prolonged by opposition from WOW-TV (channel 6), an Omaha television station that feared interference to its operation from the proposed station; the delay caused the sponsor of the station at UNO to leave and be replaced. In the interim, a radio studio was set up on campus, with broadcasting being made to the student center and cafeteria.

The FCC granted the construction permit to the university on April 7, 1971. Though the designations KUNO (in use in Corpus Christi, Texas) and KRNO were used in articles predating the permit grant, the call letters KVNO—"Voice of the University of Nebraska at Omaha", which also happened to look like "UNO"—were assigned. In March 1972, antenna construction took place on the KETV tower at 72nd Street and Crown Point Avenue, while the former Adolph Storz home at 66th and Dodge streets was selected to house the studios.

KVNO began broadcasting on August 27, 1972, originally on the air for eight hours a day. 24-hour broadcasting began in 1982, when the station also began airing programs from NPR and American Public Radio. By the mid-1980s, KVNO aired mostly jazz music, part of an agreement among the three public radio stations at the time in Omaha and Council Bluffs—KVNO, KIOS-FM 91.5, and KIWR 89.7—to reduce overlap in format; at that time, KIWR was primarily a classical music station. In order to further eliminate duplicated programs, KVNO dropped the use of NPR; it added newscasts that were provided for it by radio station WOW (590 AM).

In March 1988, UNO razed the Storz house from which KVNO had broadcast since its inception; the station had been slated to move to a new performing arts building, but the timeline was accelerated after a 4,000-pound (1,800 kg) piece of the structure's ceiling fell in, and KVNO was instead relocated to the engineering building.

Over time, KVNO became known for its long-tenured air personalities, some of them Omaha broadcasting veterans. Frank Bramhall, a television meteorologist for WOWT who had previously been heard on KIOS-FM, spent 14 years hosting mornings under the title Breakfast with Bramhall before he was dismissed in 1993; Bramhall challenged the move as age and religious discrimination, with UNO finding such claims unsubstantiated. Another Omaha TV meteorologist, Dale Munson, joined the KVNO announcing staff immediately upon retiring from WOWT in 1991 and hosted afternoons for six years. Bill Watts hosted Prime Time Jazz for 21 years until his death in 1996 of heart failure. Watts's death was followed by the end of the station's Friday and Saturday evening blues program and, in turn, with the expansion of classical music programming on Fridays. A local jazz show, Jazzsource, remained on the schedule until it was discontinued in 2006. Between 1985 and 1999, Tom May hosted the program River City Folk, which was also syndicated nationally; as part of KVNO's evolution toward a full-time classical format, the program left the station in 1999 and joined the lineup of KIOS-FM.

On July 4, 2003, KETV's tower collapsed. KVNO was out of service for two weeks until it returned at reduced power from a temporary antenna on the UNO bell tower. A month later, the station returned to full power after KMTV donated space on its mast for use by KVNO. HD Radio broadcasting began in 2009, with a second subchannel carrying MavRadio, the student radio station at UNO. A third HD subchannel was added in 2012, featuring the BBC World Service as well as additional syndicated jazz and blues shows.

== Programming ==
KVNO was traditionally self-reliant in terms of programming. It was not until January 2000 when the station debuted its first syndicated program, From the Top. The station's weekday schedule is mostly locally produced, with the exception of Performance Today and several specialty programs from American Public Media and WFMT; most of the station's weekend specialty programs are syndicated.

Previously, KVNO and NET Radio, the public radio service for Nebraska outside the Omaha area, simulcast programming in afternoons (from Lincoln) and overnight (from Omaha). This programming exchange began in 2012 as a way to save money.

At various points in station history, KVNO has diverged from its format to air UNO athletic events. This first occurred in late 1972, months after KVNO went on the air. After being exclusively on AM stations beginning in 1983, Mavericks sports returned to KVNO in 1988 for several years. In 2009, UNO athletics returned again to KVNO, also airing at times on the station's new HD2 news subchannel. The news was not communicated beforehand to station supporters. When audience members were told at a chamber music concert, there were "audible gasps in the hall"; the move upset station supporters and resulted in one person resigning from the station's community advisory board.
