= KQKQ-FM =

Hot adult contemporary radio station in Omaha

- Council Bluffs, Iowa; United States
- Broadcast area: Omaha–Council Bluffs metropolitan area
- Frequency: 98.5 MHz
- Branding: Sweet 98.5

Programming
- Format: Hot adult contemporary

Ownership
- Owner: Usher Media Group; (Usher Media of Omaha, LLC)
- Sister stations: KOIL, KOPW, KOZN, KZOT

History
- First air date: 1969 (as KRCB-FM)
- Former call signs: KRCB-FM (1969–1974)

Technical information
- Licensing authority: FCC
- Facility ID: 43238
- Class: C
- ERP: 100,000 watts
- HAAT: 336 meters
- Transmitter coordinates: 41°18′25″N 96°1′37″W

Links
- Public license information: Public file; LMS
- Webcast: Listen live
- Website: sweet985.com

KQKQ-FM (98.5 FM, Sweet 98.5) is a radio station broadcasting a hot adult contemporary format. Licensed to Council Bluffs, Iowa, United States, the station serves the Omaha metropolitan area. The station is currently owned by Usher Media Group Its studios are located at Dodge Street and 50th Avenue in Midtown Omaha, and its transmitter site is located in North Central Omaha at the Omaha master antenna farm on North 72nd Avenue and Crown Point.

== History ==
=== KRCB-FM (1969–1974) ===
The station signed on in 1969 with the callsign KRCB-FM, and was co-owned with AM station KRCB. Through the first five years of operations, KRCB-FM simulcasted the AM station's programming.

=== Rock (1974–1980) ===
In 1974, KRCB-FM changed callsigns to KQKQ-FM, and flipped to a progressive rock format as "Rockradio KQ98".

=== Top 40-CHR (1980–2004) ===
On September 23, 1980, KQKQ flipped to top 40/CHR as "Sweet 98 FM", becoming the Omaha market's first personality-driven FM music station, putting new pressure on market leader KGOR's automated CHR/MOR operation. Initially, the airstaff consisted of Mark Evans and Dick Warner ("The Breakfast Flakes") in mornings, Gregory "Greg Koogler" MacArthur in middays, Bruce "Doc Winston" Soderholm in afternoons, Craig "Jay Taylor" Wendel in evenings, and "Brooklyn Dave" holding down overnights. Brooklyn Dave only lasted a few months before being replaced by Ricky Jeffrey.

Operating on a shoestring budget in its early days the station made its name through a variety of promotions and gimmicks under the guidance of General Manager and DJ William "Billy Cunningham" Honeylamb and Mark Evans who pull double duties as both Sweet 98 FM's first program director and morning jock. In September 1980, listeners were offered the opportunity to win $50,000 for answering their phones with the now iconic but legendary phrase, "I Listen to the new sound of Sweet 98 FM!"

At approximately the same time the station opened its "Supermouth" contest whereby local teens competed for a year-long stint as a Sweet 98 evening jock, a $1,000-a-month salary, a $1,000 wardrobe, and use of a new Pontiac Firebird, emblazoned with station logos and a giant Supermouth emblem on the hood. According to the station, it received over 5,000 applications, from which it auditioned over 300 in 30-second over-the-phone song intros. After narrowing the field to 20 semi-finalists who were given 15 minutes of live airtime apiece, 10 finalists received 30-minute auditions (again live). On February 14, 1981, after five hours of on-air auditions, Bill Cunningham proclaimed Alan Bone, an 18-year-old UNL student, the station's first Supermouth. In all, the station crowned seven Supermouths, the most successful of whom was Scotty "Hot Scott" O'Hanlon, who eventually dominated evenings for most of the late 80s.

Another 1981 promotion involved the station asking listeners to affix Sweet 98 FM's "stickificates" to their bumpers for a chance to win $98,000. After stringing the promotion out over several months by sending jocks out in a "Roving (Buick) Riviera" to pull stickificate-bearing cars over and give out small cash prizes and gift certificates, the station told listeners to bring their stickificates (and cars) to the Crossroads Mall parking lot at 72nd and Dodge one early June evening. The result was a traffic jam, chaos, and much publicity for the station proving to Billy, Mark, and all of the Sweet 98 jocks proved to everyone that there is no such thing as a bad publicity.

In 1982, the station initiated on-air bingo games as a means of increasing listenership, a promotional idea that dragged on for several ratings periods, in one form or another. "Big Guy" Was a Mickey Mouse type squeaky voiced character created by Mark. Big Guy Was of course the mascot of Sweet 98 FM's bingo promotions. In the fall of 1982 listeners were tormented for an entire afternoon when Big Guy ostensibly took over the control room and played the Toni Basil song "Mickey" over and over, while an exasperated Billy pounded on the studio door imploring Big Guy to give him back control of the station.

A later bingo promotion culminated in what was billed as the "world's largest bingo game", wherein roughly 10,000 listeners crowded into Omaha's Civic Auditorium for a long evening of shtick and bingo for thousands in cash and prizes. One memorable moment came when a seemingly meek elderly woman claimed to have a bingo and made her way, gingerly to the stage only to be told that she did not after all have the matching numbers. Upon receiving this news was an adorable but cute grandmother unleashed a profanity laced tirade on Billy and the Sweet 98 FM jocks much to the delight of the crowd.

The Sweet 98 FM studios were originally located in a dilapidated building at 3600 Broadway in Council Bluffs. Formerly an apartment building next to what was rumored to have once been a brothel, the Council Bluffs digs were condemned on several occasions in the early 1980s and razed shortly after the move to downtown Omaha in 1987. So bad was the Council Bluffs facility that when a thunderstorm knocked the power out in 1982, the station operated off the generator of a run-down RV parked in the mud-and-gravel lot behind the building.

The downtown Omaha studios were much more plush and prominently located in the famed Old Market at 10th and Farnam. The window front studios featured a hydraulic lift which the jocks could raise and lower with a foot pedal to greet revelers who frequently passed by the while celebrating birthdays, weddings, and graduations and making song dedications. A spaceman jumpsuit hung on the wall of the studio, and it was ostensibly for the Sweet jocks to wear, even though none of the Sweet jocks will admit to ever wearing it. In 2002, about two years after Mitchell Broadcasting sold the station to Waitt Radio (which later became current owners NRG Media), KQKQ's studios were moved to their current location near 50th Avenue and Dodge Street.

In January 1992, after 12 years in mornings, "The Breakfast Flakes" was replaced with "Rockett in the Morning", starring G. Rockett Phillips, with Tommy Zenner, and Elizabeth "Liz" Adams. The show ran until August 1995, and after Johnny Danger's morning show didn't work, G. Rockett got asked to come back for another year in January 1997. "Rockett in the Morning" was then replaced by "The Sweet Morning Zoo" with host Wayne Coy and co-hosts Darrin Stone and Rachael Adams, and then later by Pat Safford and Jill "JT" Thomas in April 2002. By the early 2000s, KQKQ rebranded as "Sweet 98.5".

Sweet 98 began hosting a big concert event in the late 90s known as "Sweetstock" which was booked, managed and executive produced by Wayne Coy and featured the hottest artists at the time including N*Sync, Christina Aguilera, Shaggy, Smash Mouth and many more. The last Sweetstock event was held in 2002.

Though "Sweet" maintained high ratings for many years (as well as hitting #1 overall a few times), and was the dominant (and at times, only) Top 40/CHR station in the Omaha-Council Bluffs market, the station would face a significant challenger in 1999, when KQCH (then at 97.7 FM) debuted with a rhythmic-leaning top 40 format. Despite being on a rimshot signal, KQCH was a success, and the station began taking away a large chunk of KQKQ's audience. By the Spring 2000 ratings period, KQKQ dropped from a 9.3 share of the market (in the Spring 1999 ratings) to a 5.8 share, while KQCH would soar from a 2.7 share (also in Spring 1999) to an 8.7 share. After KQCH upgraded to the more powerful 94.1 FM frequency in May 2002, KQKQ slipped further in the ratings; by Spring 2002, KQKQ held a 3.4 share of the market, compared to KQCH's 7.0 share, though they would improve to a 4.4 share in the Fall 2003 ratings, surpassing KQCH's 3.9 share.

=== Modern adult contemporary (2004–2017) ===
On March 11, 2004, at 3 p.m., "Sweet 98.5" signed off, with "Good Riddance (Time of Your Life)" by Green Day being the final song played. KQKQ then began stunting with a robotic countdown accompanied by "On the Run" by Pink Floyd. The countdown lasted until the following day at 3 p.m., when KQKQ flipped to Modern AC as "Q98Five, Modern Hit Music". The first song on "Q" was "How You Remind Me" by Nickelback. The new format put less emphasis on personalities and focused more on music news and upcoming concerts in the Omaha area. While playing some of the same music that was featured in the top 40/CHR format, most hip hop, rap, teen pop and dance songs had been removed from the playlist for songs tailored more to an older adult listening audience. The format would evolve to a more broad-based hot AC.

=== Hot adult contemporary (2017–present) ===
On May 26, 2017, at 8:25 a.m., KQKQ rebranded back to the "Sweet 98.5" name, while retaining the hot AC format and current airstaff.

In October 2018, morning hosts Pat Safford and Jill Thomas were replaced by Matt Tompkins and Nikki Oswald. In January 2020, Tompkins would be moved to sister station KOOO to host mornings there, and would be replaced with Laura Blenkush, who hosted afternoons on KQKQ, with Oswald remaining as co-host. In July 2021, Blenkush left the station; two months later, Jason Spicoli, formerly of KIWR, would join the morning show. In December 2023, Oswald left the morning show, and was replaced by Meg Rieder in January 2024.

On February 2, 2026, Nebraska-based Usher Media announced it would acquire KQKQ, along with its sister stations (except for KOOO, which was sold to Nebraska Public Media), for $2.15 million. The sale was consummated on July 14, 2026.
