= KISO (FM) =

Contemporary hit radio station in Omaha, Nebraska

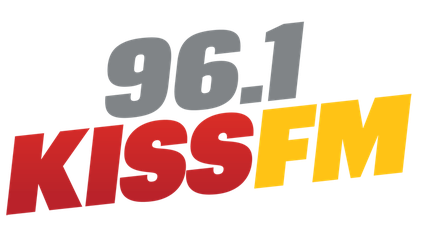
- Omaha, Nebraska; United States
- Broadcast area: Omaha metropolitan area
- Frequency: 96.1 MHz (HD Radio)
- Branding: 96.1 KISS FM

Programming
- Format: Top 40 (CHR)
- Subchannels: HD2: Rock 94.9 (Mainstream rock)
- Affiliations: Premiere Networks

Ownership
- Owner: iHeartMedia, Inc.; (iHM Licenses, LLC)
- Sister stations: KFAB, KFFF, KGOR, KXKT

History
- First air date: September 1976
- Former call signs: KEFM (1976–2005); KQBW (2005–2012)
- Call sign meaning: KISs Omaha

Technical information
- Licensing authority: FCC
- Facility ID: 71411
- Class: C0 (main and auxiliary antenna 2); C (auxiliary 1)
- ERP: 82,000 watts
- HAAT: 331 meters (1,086 ft)
- Transmitter coordinates: 41.308889°N 96.026139°W
- Translator: HD2: 94.9 K235CD (Omaha)

Links
- Public license information: Public file; LMS
- Webcast: Listen Live; Listen Live (HD2)
- Website: 961kissonline.iheart.com; rock949omaha.iheart.com (HD2)

KISO (96.1 MHz, "96.1 KISS FM") is a contemporary hit radio station in Omaha, Nebraska, owned by iHeartMedia, Inc. The studios are near North 50th Street and Underwood Avenue in Midtown Omaha. In AM drive time, it carries Elvis Duran and the Morning Show from co-owned WHTZ New York.

KISO has an effective radiated power (ERP) of 82,000 watts. The transmitter tower is at North 72nd Street and Crown Point at the Omaha master antenna farm. KISO is licensed by the Federal Communications Commission (FCC) to broadcast using HD Radio technology. The HD2 subchannel carries a mainstream rock format, known as "Rock 94.9", which feeds FM translator K235CD, broadcasting on 94.9 MHz.

== History ==
=== KCOM, KICN, KOIL-FM and KEFM ===
The 96.1 FM frequency signed on the air in September 1976. It originally broadcast from Council Bluffs, Iowa. The change in its city of license was made after a station known as KFAM had gone dark. (This was probably KFMX Council Bluffs which switched off in 1952. OmahaRadioHistory.com) In 1959, a station known as KCOM surfaced at 96.1 when a couple of hobbyists used the frequency to broadcast classical music, with an Omaha broadcast license. Their studios were in the Rorick Apartments with a tower on top of the building, where it remained through the Burden years until toppled in a 1980 storm.

During the Burden years, KICN was the FM sister station to KOIL 1290 AM. Although a simulcast with KOIL, the KICN call letters were being preserved from Burden's Denver property on 710 that didn't succeed and was sold off. During this time, 1290 KOIL was a very popular Top 40 station, with 96.1 used as an FM simulcast.

In 1967, the FM station began using the call sign KOIL-FM. At the time, the FCC was encouraging AM-FM simulcasts to offer different programming. KOIL-FM became a beautiful music station. It was an automated operation, playing quarter-hour sweeps of soft, instrumental music. In 1974 that it switched its call letters to KEFM.

=== New Country ===
In 1976, the Burden stations were shut down by the FCC due to violations. But KEFM returned to broadcasting in December of that same year with the same beautiful music format.

Then in December 1978, the easy listening sounds ended. KEFM switched to "New Country". By 1980, KEFM was positioning itself as "96-One". On January 28, 1981, KEFM's tower fell to the ground due to a storm, and would go silent for the next two years.

=== AC format ===
On October 21, 1983, KEFM went back on the air, which began 20 years under the ownership of the Webster family. Instead of country music, it returned with an adult contemporary format as "Lite 96."

A slight repositioning of "Lite 96" was made in May 1999, when the station became "Mix 96.1". Owner John Webster decided to get out of the radio business almost 20 years to the date of KEFM's resurrection. The station was sold to San Antonio-based Clear Channel Communications, a forerunner to today's iHeartMedia. Webster left with $10 million. Clear Channel obtained Omaha's last locally owned, stand-alone commercial FM station.

=== KQBW Classic Rock ===
Clear Channel's attempts to rebuild the slow erosion of KEFM's AC ratings failed, so it was time for a change. At 5 a.m. on September 22, 2005, an "All Christmas" format was launched as a stunt. (KEFM had done a Christmas music format prior to Thanksgiving in 2004.)

The next afternoon, at 4:00 p.m., KEFM flipped to classic rock as "The Brew" using the call sign KQBW. The music centered mostly on 1980s rock, with core artists including Aerosmith, Bon Jovi, Van Halen and AC/DC, while flavoring the format with 1970s bands such as Boston and Lynyrd Skynyrd and 1990s music from acts like Stone Temple Pilots and Pearl Jam. It also featured a good helping of 1980s pop-rock, such as John Cougar Mellencamp, Bryan Adams, and Pat Benatar. KQBW was one of five radio stations that used "The Brew" branding, alongside sister stations in Oklahoma City, New Orleans, Columbus and Portland, Oregon. It was the second outlet to use the brand after WQBW in Milwaukee.

KQBW debuted its on-air lineup on October 4, 2005. It initially consisted of The Morning Brew with Mookie & Michelle (5:30-10am), "Crash" Davis (10am-3pm), "Steve-O" (3–7 pm) and Lucy Chapman (7–11 pm). The Brew later rounded out its airstaff with weekenders Marty Simpson and "Bam-Bam". On-air features of "The Brew" included "6-Packs of Brew Music", "The 90s At Noon" and "The Friday Free-For-All".

In January 2007, the Brew shuffled its lineup, moving Steve-O to middays, Crash Davis to evenings, and adding afternoon driver Ethan Stone and weekend talent Lester St. James, formerly of the Brew's rival, Z-92. St. James departed the station in the summer of 2007. Also in January 2007, the station changed its positioning statement from "Everything Rock, the 80s and More" to "The Biggest Variety of Rock Hits", as the focus shifted toward a more expanded playlist of 1990s and even early 2000s music, like Three Doors Down and Creed.

In February 2008, the Brew changed its on-air staff again, shifting Ethan Stone to mornings (joining Michelle as "The New Morning Brew"), moving Mookie to middays, and Crash Davis to afternoons.

=== KISO Top 40 ===
On September 2, 2012, at 6:20 p.m., KQBW changed its format to Top 40 (CHR) as "96-1 KISS FM". Simultaneously, the "Brew" name and format moved to the station's HD2 subchannel. A number of other iHeart Top 40 CHR stations use the KISS-FM brand, including KIIS-FM Los Angeles, KHKS Dallas and WXKS-FM Boston.

On September 12, 2012, KQBW changed call letters to KISO to match the "KISS FM" moniker. On November 11, 2014, the HD2 subchannel was re-launched as "Christmas 94.9". On December 26, 2014, at Midnight, after playing "Rockin' Around the Christmas Tree" by Brenda Lee, the HD2 signal, simulcast on translators 94.9 K235CD and 102.3 K272FE (as well as the latter frequency being simulcast on 93.3-HD2), flipped to mainstream rock as "Rock 94.9/102.3". The first song on "Rock" was "Cum On Feel the Noize" by Quiet Riot.

== HD2 translator ==
Call sign	Frequency	City of license	FID	ERP (W)	HAAT	Class	Transmitter coordinates	FCC info
K235CD	(94.9 MHz) FM	Omaha, Nebraska	138619	110	178 m (584 ft)	D	41°15′26″N 95°57′52″W	LMS
