= WJCV =

- Jacksonville, North Carolina; United States
- Frequency: 1290 kHz

Programming
- Format: Southern Gospel

Ownership
- Owner: Down East Broadcasting

Technical information
- Licensing authority: FCC
- Class: D
- Power: 5,000 watts day 47 watts night
- Transmitter coordinates: 34°45′58″N 77°23′28″W
- Translator: 98.3 W252BO (Jacksonville)

Links
- Public license information: Public file; LMS
- Webcast: Listen Live
- Website: wjcv.com

WJCV (1290 AM) is a radio station broadcasting a Southern Gospel format. It is licensed to Jacksonville, North Carolina. The station is owned by Down East Broadcasting.
