= KXKT =

Radio station in Glenwood, Iowa

- Glenwood, Iowa; United States
- Broadcast area: Omaha-Council Bluffs
- Frequency: 103.7 MHz (HD Radio)
- Branding: Kat 103.7

Programming
- Format: Country music
- Affiliations: Premiere Networks

Ownership
- Owner: iHeartMedia, Inc.; (iHM Licenses, LLC)
- Sister stations: KFAB, KFFF, KGOR, KISO

History
- First air date: 1980; 46 years ago
- Former call signs: KJAN-FM (1980–1988); KOMJ (1988–1990)
- Call sign meaning: KXKaT

Technical information
- Licensing authority: FCC
- Facility ID: 69686
- Class: C0
- ERP: 100,000 watts
- HAAT: 331 meters (1,086 ft)
- Transmitter coordinates: 41°18′32″N 96°1′34.1″W

Links
- Public license information: Public file; LMS
- Webcast: Listen Live
- Website: thekat.iheart.com

KXKT (103.7 FM) is an American radio station broadcasting a country music format. Licensed to Glenwood, Iowa, United States, the station serves the Omaha area. The station is owned by iHeartMedia, Inc. and licensed as iHM Licenses, LLC. KXKT's studios are located at 50th Street and Underwood Avenue in Midtown Omaha, while its transmitter is located at the Omaha master antenna farm at North 72nd Street and Crown Point.

== History ==
=== Rock/Top 40 (1980–1992) ===
KXKT started as KJAN-FM, an album rock station. It gradually moved to Top 40, competing against KQKQ-FM ("Sweet 98"). The call letters changed to KOMJ in 1988 and then to KXKT in 1990. With the tower originally in Atlantic, Iowa, "103.7 The Kat" struggled against the heritage and popular "Sweet 98."

=== Alternative (1992) ===
In April 1992, the station began adding more alternative rock music in the playlist. By summer of 1992, the station turned to a more straight forward alternative playlist.

=== Country (1992–present) ===
However, at Midnight on October 6, 1992, KXKT would abruptly flip to country as "KT-103". The last song before the flip was "If I Can't Change Your Mind" by Sugar, while the first song under the country format was by Travis Tritt. "KT-103, Omaha's Continuous Country" kept the same on-air staff (many who had never played country music before) as well as the "Kat" branding, a rarity in the radio industry, where flipping formats usually results in new on-air staffs and branding.

KXKT is licensed by the U.S. Federal Communications Commission to broadcast in the HD (hybrid) format.

former logo
