= KOZN =

Coordinates: 41°11′21″N 96°00′20.1″W

- Bellevue, Nebraska; United States
- Broadcast area: Omaha metropolitan area
- Frequency: 1620 kHz
- Branding: 1620 The Zone

Programming
- Format: Sports
- Affiliations: Fox Sports Radio; Kansas City Royals; NFL on Westwood One Sports

Ownership
- Owner: Usher Media Group; (Usher Media of Omaha, LLC)
- Sister stations: KOIL, KZOT, KQKQ-FM, KOPW

History
- First air date: September 1999; 27 years ago (as KAZP)
- Former call signs: KAZP (1998–2001)
- Call sign meaning: K Omaha ZoNe

Technical information
- Licensing authority: FCC
- Facility ID: 87182
- Class: B
- Power: 10,000 watts day 1,000 watts night

Links
- Public license information: Public file; LMS
- Webcast: Listen live
- Website: 1620thezone.com

KOZN (1620 AM, "1620 The Zone") is a radio station licensed to Bellevue, Nebraska and serving the Omaha metropolitan area. Owned by Usher Media Group, it broadcasts a sports radio format.

Its studios are located at Dodge Street and 50th Avenue in Midtown Omaha, while its transmitter is located on Harrison Street at South 60th Street in Bellevue. By day, KOZN is powered at 10,000 watts non-directional. At night, it reduces its power to 1,000 watts to avoid interfering with other stations on the 1620 AM band.

== Programming ==
KOZN has local sports programming Monday through Friday from 6:00 a.m. to 8:00 p.m. Weekdays begin with Happer & Schaefer followed by Middays With Matt in middays, Unsportsmanlike Conduct, hosted by John Bishop and Josh Peterson, in afternoon drive time, and After Hours with Jimmie Allen in early evenings. Other local shows includeThe Creighton Athletics Hour, Severe Reaction with Mike'l Severe, and pre and postgame shows for Nebraska Cornhuskers football and Creighton University basketball and baseball.

KOZN features mostly local sports talk shows with Fox Sports Radio heard late nights and weekends. KOZN carries Westwood One NFL Football and NCAA Basketball, as well as some Kansas City Royals baseball games. KOZN originates and produces all game broadcasts of the NCAA Men's College World Series, held each June in Omaha, and distributed nationally by Westwood One. Play by play is provided by eight-time Nebraska Sportscaster of the Year Kevin Kugler.

== History ==
KOZN originated as the AM expanded band "twin" of an existing station on the standard AM dial. On March 17, 1997 the Federal Communications Commission (FCC) announced that 88 stations had been given permission to move to newly available "Expanded Band" transmitting frequencies, ranging from 1610 to 1700 kHz. KOIL (now KZOT) in Bellevue was authorized to move from 1180 to 1620 kHz. An application to construct the expanded band station, also located in Bellevue, was filed by Mitchell Broadcasting on June 16, 1997, which was assigned the call letters KAZP on January 9, 1998. This station on 1620 AM began broadcasting September 1999, and its call letters were changed to KOZN on October 3, 2001.

The FCC's initial policy was that both the original station and its expanded band counterpart could operate simultaneously for up to five years, after which owners would have to turn in one of the two licenses, depending on whether they preferred the new assignment or elected to remain on the original frequency. However, this deadline has been extended multiple times, and broadcasting on both 1180 and 1620 kHz has remained authorized. One restriction is that the FCC has generally required paired original and expanded band stations to remain under common ownership.

The original morning team of John Desjardins and Mike Steele, aka "Louie & The Animal" was called The Cage. It was replaced by the Bruno-Golic Morning Show when the station debuted the ESPN Radio full-time lineup. Unsportsmanlike Conduct began with Kevin Kugler and Bob Bruce in 2000, and has been on the air continually since. As of February 1, 2011, 1620 The Zone discontinued its affiliation with ESPN Radio, switching to Fox Sports Radio. ESPN programming is now heard nights and weekends on KXSP 590 AM in Omaha.

From 2012 to 2025, the station operated a sister outlet, KZOT, which primarily carried the Infinity Sports Network lineup, as well as Creighton Bluejays baseball, women's basketball, and women's volleyball, and Omaha Storm Chasers baseball.
