= KLNG =

- Council Bluffs, Iowa; United States
- Broadcast area: Omaha and Lincoln areas
- Frequency: 1560 kHz

Programming
- Format: Christian radio

Ownership
- Owner: Wilkins Communications Network, Inc.

History
- First air date: 1947
- Former call signs: KSWI (1947–1963); KRCB (1963–1978); KQXV (1978–1979)

Technical information
- Licensing authority: FCC
- Facility ID: 72464
- Class: D
- Power: 10,000 watts (day); 2,100 watts (critical hours); 332 watts (post-sunset; sign-off 2 hours after Council Bluffs sunset)
- Transmitter coordinates: 41°12′28″N 95°54′24″W
- Translator: 101.5 K268DI (Council Bluffs)

Links
- Public license information: Public file; LMS
- Webcast: Listen live
- Website: wilkinsradio.com/our-stations/klng-1560am-omaha-ne

KLNG (1560 AM) is a radio station broadcasting a Christian radio format. Licensed to Council Bluffs, Iowa, United States, the station serves the Omaha-Lincoln-Council Bluffs area. The station is licensed to Wilkins Communications Network, Inc.

== History ==
The station went on the air as KSWI (for "Southwest Iowa") in 1947. The station at the time was owned by the Council Bluffs Nonpareil newspaper and the studios were located in the Strand Theater in Council Bluffs. Around 1963 or 1964, the station was purchased by Abe Slusky, the studios were moved to a location at 546 Mynster Street, and the call letters were changed to KRCB ("Radio Council Bluffs"). In July 1967, Slusky sold KRCB to Michigan lawyer James J. Conroy. In March 1969, KRCB adopted a Top 40 format, and would add an FM sister station, KRCB-FM (98.5), that same year. The polka music programming that had been a popular feature on KSWI was given new life on KRCB in 1970 as "The Big Joe Polka Show"; hosted by Joe Siedlick and airing on Sunday mornings. On October 25, 1978, KRCB's callsign was changed to KQXV (the "XV" being the Roman numeral for 15, to represent the station's approximate position on the AM dial). On April 11, 1979, the callsign was changed again, this time to KLNG. The KLNG calls originally were assigned to 1490 AM, which had a news/talk format in the 1970s. In June 1988, KLNG would change to Christian programming.

KRCB-FM would become KQKQ-FM in 1974, and flipped to progressive rock as "KQ98." In September 1980, KQKQ-FM flipped to a Top 40/CHR format as "Sweet 98," which would go on to become one of the Omaha market's most popular stations for the next 23 years. In April 1989, KQKQ-FM and KLNG's common ownership would be severed, as Mitchell Broadcasting would sell KLNG to Wilkins Communications. Currently, KQKQ-FM airs a hot adult contemporary format branded as "Sweet 98.5."

Former logo
