= KOPW =

Radio station in Plattsmouth–Omaha, Nebraska

Coordinates: 41.155°N 95.762°W

- Plattsmouth, Nebraska; United States
- Broadcast area: Omaha-Council Bluffs
- Frequency: 106.9 MHz
- Branding: Country One 106.9

Programming
- Format: Country

Ownership
- Owner: Usher Media Group; (Usher Media of Omaha, LLC)
- Sister stations: KOIL, KOZN, KQKQ-FM, KZOT

History
- First air date: 1992
- Former call signs: KOTD-FM (1992–1999); KCTY (1999–2006)
- Call sign meaning: Omaha's Power (former Branding)

Technical information
- Licensing authority: FCC
- Facility ID: 52801
- Class: C3
- ERP: 25,000 watts
- HAAT: 100 meters (330 ft)

Links
- Public license information: Public file; LMS
- Webcast: Listen live
- Website: countryoneomaha.com

KOPW (106.9 FM, "Country One") is a commercial radio station licensed to Plattsmouth, Nebraska, United States, and serving the Omaha-Council Bluffs radio market. Owned by Usher Media Group, with studios at 50th and West Dodge in Midtown Omaha, it airs a country music format.

KOPW's transmitter is located on Ashton Road in Council Bluffs, Iowa.

== History ==
The station signed on the air in 1992 as KOTD-FM and had an adult standards format. That lasted until November 1999.

In 1999, the station was sold to Waitt Media (later NRG Media). The new owners flipped the station to adult album alternative (AAA) as KCTY ("106-9 The City"). By September 2000, KCTY shifted to a more mainstream alternative rock format in the hopes of boosting ratings.

On March 12, 2004, at 3 p.m., after stunting with a 24-hour robotic countdown accompanied by "On the Run" by Pink Floyd, the station flipped to All-80s Hits as "Retro 106.9".

Just 14 months later, on May 26, 2005, at noon, the station flipped to adult hits as "106-9 Bob FM." The first song on "Bob FM" was "Get This Party Started" by P!nk.

As 2002 ended, KOTD's sister station, KBLR-FM, which aired adult contemporary music, began to target the market with an Urban Contemporary format as "Hot 107.7 & 97.3." It was the first commercial station in the state of Nebraska to play Hip Hop and R&B music full-time. But it was signal-challenged from the start, since KBLR-FM, licensed to Blair, Nebraska, barely covered the metro area, while the 107.7 frequency was a low-powered FM translator. Despite the signal deficiencies, the format created the highest ratings and revenue in the history of those signals, and was home of the Russ Parr Morning Show during its tenure.

On December 29, 2006, at 3 p.m., NRG turned KCTY into the all-new KOPW ("Power 106.9"). Based from KBLR playing Hip Hop/R&B, the Urban format tilted over to Rhythmic is "in fashion" with the frequency move.

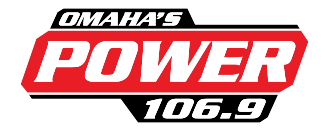
Previous logo

With KOPW going Rhythmic, it now puts them in direct competition with Top 40 Mainstream competitors KQCH (who, incidentally, started out as a Rhythmic when they debuted in May 1999), and since 2012, KISO. At first, KOPW was reported to R&R as an urban contemporary station, but has since evolved to a broader Rhythmic direction, and in October 2009, was added to both Mediabase and Nielsen BDS' Rhythmic panels.

On February 2, 2026, Usher Media announced that it would acquire KOPW alongside its five stations that NRG currently owns for $2.15 million. The sale was consummated on July 14, 2026.

On August 13, 2026, at 3 p.m., KOPW flipped to country, branded as "Country One 106.9."

=== Morning shows ===
From October 2007 until April 5, 2019, KOPW served as the Omaha affiliate for the syndicated, Los Angeles-based "Big Boy’s Neighborhood." It aired in mornings, until NRG decided not to renew its contract with Premiere Networks. On April 8, 2019, the station became local in all day parts with the debut of “Chef West & The Morning Scramble” hosted by Tay ‘Mr. West’ Westberry (who is also a professional chef, hence the nickname) and former American Idol season 13 contestant (and YouTube blogger) Alyssa Siebken. The show lasted nearly a year; Westberry and Siebken would be moved to afternoons, with mornings going jockless for a time.

On February 24, 2021, NRG announced that KOPW would pick up the syndicated "Breakfast Club" for mornings beginning March 1. "The Breakfast Club" is syndicated by Premiere Networks and is based at WWPR New York. It is led by Charlamagne tha God and DJ Envy.

== See also ==
- Houston Alexander
