= KIOS-FM =

- Omaha, Nebraska; United States
- Broadcast area: Omaha–Council Bluffs metropolitan area
- Frequency: 91.5 MHz (HD Radio)
- Branding: Omaha Public Radio, 91.5 KIOS

Programming
- Format: Public radio, talk and jazz
- Affiliations: NPR; BBC World Service

Ownership
- Owner: Omaha Public Schools; (Douglas County School District 001)

History
- First air date: September 15, 1969
- Call sign meaning: "Instruction Omaha Schools"

Technical information
- Licensing authority: FCC
- Facility ID: 17416
- Class: C1
- ERP: 55,000 watts
- HAAT: 169 meters (554 ft)
- Transmitter coordinates: 41.288°N 95.994°W

Links
- Public license information: Public file; LMS
- Webcast: Listen live
- Website: kios.org

KIOS-FM (91.5 FM, "Omaha Public Radio") is a noncommercial educational radio station licensed to Omaha, Nebraska, United States, and serving the Omaha–Council Bluffs metropolitan area. Owned by the Omaha Public Schools (OPS), it is the market's primary member station of National Public Radio (NPR), carrying a mixed format of news, information, and jazz. The studios are located inside the Career Center (building number 14) within the south side of the Teacher and Administration Center (TAC) building on the headquarters of OPS on Burt Street in the Midtown/Gifford Park neighborhood of Omaha northwest of downtown, and the transmitter tower is located between the campuses of Benson High School and Monroe Middle School at 52nd and Maple streets in the Benson neighborhood of the city’s northwest side.

The station signed in on September 1969 and was the second noncommercial station in Omaha. Initially primarily intended as a teaching tool for students in radio broadcasting programs in Omaha high schools, it became a charter member of NPR in 1971 and shifted its emphasis toward news and information programming. KIOS-FM has an annual budget of $1.2 million and employs 15 people.

== History ==
On October 4, 1967, Omaha Public Schools applied to the Federal Communications Commission (FCC) for a new radio station to serve the Omaha area. It initially proposed to build a commercial station on 104.5 MHz, feeling an assignment any lower would cause interference concerns to WOW-TV (channel 6), but the application was granted instead for a noncommercial outlet on 91.5 MHz on March 27, 1968. KIOS-FM began broadcasting programming on September 15, 1969.

The original format primarily consisted of daytime educational programs for use in the city schools, classical music, and variety programming. The studios and transmitter were originally at Central High School, and most of the students taking broadcasting classes utilizing KIOS attended that school. In 1974, KIOS-FM began subcarrier broadcasts of a regional radio reading service for the blind, Radio Talking Book, which was the sixth such service in the United States.

In 1975, the KIOS transmitter was moved to its present location at Benson High School, a higher site—the highest parcel OPS owned—that allowed increased coverage. That same year, the studios moved to Technical High School—now the headquarters of OPS—as part of a centralization of the radio and television production programs in the district. As KIOS shifted to providing mostly public radio programming, and to provide additional opportunities for hands-on experience, student training switched to a new carrier current station inside Technical High School in 1977.

In a time before Morning Edition, the station aired a morning classical music program hosted by longtime Omaha broadcaster Frank Bramhall, who also served as a Top 40 DJ and television meteorologist; Bramhall would move to KVNO (90.7 FM) in 1979. KIOS-FM began soliciting public donations in 1982 in the face of declining allocations from OPS and the Corporation for Public Broadcasting.

Despite the addition of Love Notes, a jazz show hosted by Omaha musician Preston Love, KIOS experienced operational turmoil in the early 1980s during the managerial tenure of Frank Coopersmith, who proposed changes in programming that included big band music in response to declining ratings; Coopersmith had been hired by OPS in part because KVNO had surpassed KIOS. Listeners and members of the station's community advisory board protested the reshuffle as moving KIOS-FM away from its information and education remit. Coopersmith was fired in 1984 in what he alleged was a political move to remove employees seen as close to the recently dismissed superintendent of Omaha schools; other district employees called him "abrasive" as a manager and insubordinate. While the station began 24-hour broadcasting for the first time in 1985, this was curtailed for a time five years later due to school board budget cuts.

In 1985, an agreement among the three NPR-aligned stations then serving Omaha and Council Bluffs—KIOS-FM, KIWR, and KVNO—resulted in KIOS adopting its current news and information emphasis.
