= KIMI (FM) =

Air 1 radio station in Malvern, Iowa

- Malvern, Iowa; United States
- Broadcast area: Omaha-Council Bluffs
- Frequency: 107.7 MHz
- Branding: Air1

Programming
- Format: Worship music
- Affiliations: Air1

Ownership
- Owner: Educational Media Foundation

History
- Former frequencies: 107.9 MHz (2011–2023)

Technical information
- Licensing authority: FCC
- Facility ID: 189501
- Class: A
- ERP: 1,200 watts
- HAAT: 124.0 meters (406.8 ft)
- Transmitter coordinates: 40°13′55″N 95°58′18″W

Links
- Public license information: Public file; LMS

KIMI (107.7 MHz) is a contemporary worship music FM radio station licensed to Malvern, Iowa, United States, serving the Omaha–Council Bluffs metropolitan area. The station is owned by the Educational Media Foundation and carries its Air1 network.

== Construction permit ==
This frequency (107.7 MHz) was supposed to be the planned construction permit (CP) for station KGGG, but the application was cancelled and deleted in 2010, over issues with the Federal Aviation Administration over its transmitter location. KIMI's owners have long tried to move its transmitter closer to Omaha, but have been continually rebuffed by the FCC and FAA, due to the 107.7 frequency causing interference to the nearby aircraft band utilized by Offutt Air Force Base and Eppley Airfield, Omaha's civil commercial airport.

On June 15, 2012, KIMI filed an application to modify the existing U.S. Federal Communications Commission (FCC) CP. It had been planned to be 6,000 watts at 107.9 MHz. The station moved to 107.7 MHz, changed the city of license to Sidney, Iowa, moved to a new transmitter site, increased ERP to 50,000 watts, and increased HAAT to 124 meters.

107.7 KIMI signed on around February 9, 2013 testing with classic rock music.

In late April 2016, it was announced that 107.7 KIMI was being sold to the Educational Media Foundation and slated as a satellite of 92.7 KYRA FM in Thousand Oaks, California to service the Omaha, NE Metro area with Christian Rock from the nationally syndicated Air1 network. As of October 2016, the station was granted a special authority to operate with reduced power of 110 watts. It had been broadcasting a commercial-free classic rock format since October 14, 2016. The sale of KIMI by Kona Coast Radio to EMF, at a price of $100,000, was consummated on October 11, 2017.
