= KMMQ =

Radio station in Plattsmouth, Nebraska

- Plattsmouth, Nebraska; United States
- Broadcast area: Omaha, Nebraska
- Frequency: 1020 kHz
- Branding: La Nueva 99.5 y 1020 AM

Programming
- Format: Spanish Variety

Ownership
- Owner: Munoz Media; (Munoz Media, LLC)

History
- First air date: October 26, 1970
- Former call signs: KOTD (1970–2002); KKSC (2002–2003); KOIL (2003–2009)
- Call sign meaning: "Mas Musica Q"

Technical information
- Licensing authority: FCC
- Facility ID: 52802
- Class: B
- Power: 50,000 watts (day); 1,400 watts (night)
- Transmitter coordinates: 41°05′12″N 95°42′46″W
- Translator: 99.5 K258DC (Omaha)

Links
- Public license information: Public file; LMS
- Webcast: Listen Live
- Website: lanuevaomaha.com

KMMQ (1020 AM, "La Nueva 99.5 y 1020") is a radio station licensed to serve Plattsmouth, Nebraska. The station is owned by Munoz Media. KMMQ's transmitter site is located near Glenwood, Iowa.

KMMQ broadcasts a Spanish Variety music format to the Omaha metropolitan area.

== History ==
This station began broadcasting on October 26, 1970, as daytime-only KOTD with 250 watts of power on 1000 kHz under the ownership of the Platte Broadcasting Company, Inc. The station was run by J.P. Warga as president and general manager. By 1979, the station was being run by Charles Warga as president and general manager and Jo Warga as comptroller.

In August 1994, KOTD applied to the FCC to change frequencies to the current 1020 kHz and increase daytime power to 1,000 watts. The construction permit was granted in October 1994 and the station received its license to cover for the new frequency and signal power on August 22, 1996.

In April 1998, Platte Broadcasting Company, Inc., reached an agreement to transfer the broadcast license for this station to Warga Broadcasting, LLC. The deal was approved by the FCC on April 28, 1998, and the transaction was consummated on May 8, 1998.

In November 2000, Warga Broadcasting, LLC (Charles Warga, member/manager) agreed to sell KOTD to Waitt Radio, Inc. (Norman W. Waitt Jr., chairman/owner) for a reported sale price of $750,000. The deal was approved by the FCC on December 20, 2000, and the transaction was consummated on January 17, 2001.

In May 2001, KOTD applied to the FCC for another power increase, this time to the current 50,000 watt daytime authorization. In March 2002, the permit was amended to add 1,400 watt nighttime operation as well. The station received its updated license on June 4, 2002.

On February 14, 2002, the station changed its call letters to KKSC. In April, the station flipped to a country music format that targeted Sarpy County. On April 22, 2003, the station adopted the legendary KOIL call sign, flipped to classic country as "KOIL Country 1020 AM", and moved their studio from Bellevue to Omaha.

In 2005, the entire Waitt Radio station group was transferred to NRG Media, also owned by Norman W. Waitt Jr. Internal corporate transfers in 2005 and 2006 saw the license pass to Waitt Omaha, LLC, then to Waittcorp Investments, LLC, before current license holder NRG Media, LLC, on March 14, 2006.

From January 2006 to January 2009, the station broadcast with Radio Disney Network.

On January 1, 2009, the station was assigned new call letters KMMQ as the KOIL call sign was moved to a sister station on 1180 AM.

In July 2025, NRG Media announced that KMMQ and K258DC would be sold to Munoz Media, a group led by former station program director Jose Munoz. The sale was consummated on November 3, 2025.

Former logo
