= KFFF (FM) =

- Bennington, Nebraska; United States
- Broadcast area: Omaha-Council Bluffs
- Frequency: 93.3 MHz (HD Radio)
- Branding: 93.3 The Wolf

Programming
- Format: FM/HD1: Classic country
- Subchannels: HD2: Regional Mexican "102.3 El Patron"

Ownership
- Owner: iHeartMedia; (iHM Licenses, LLC)
- Sister stations: KFAB, KGOR, KISO, KXKT

History
- First air date: 1991; 35 years ago (as KRRK)
- Former call signs: KRRK (1989–1996); KTNP (1996–2000); KRQC (2000–2004); KHUS (2004–2008); KTWI (2008–2012)

Technical information
- Licensing authority: FCC
- Facility ID: 163
- Class: C3
- ERP: 1,000 watts
- HAAT: 361 meters (1,184 ft)
- Transmitter coordinates: 41°18′16″N 96°01′42″W
- Translators: 102.3 K272FE (Omaha, relays HD2)

Links
- Public license information: Public file; LMS
- Webcast: Listen Live; Listen Live (HD2)
- Website: wolfradio933.iheart.com 1023elpatron.iheart.com (HD2)

KFFF (93.3 FM) is a radio station with a classic country format. Licensed to Bennington, Nebraska, United States, the station serves the Omaha area. The station is currently owned by iHeartMedia and licensed as iHM Licenses, LLC. The station's studios are located on Underwood Avenue in Omaha, while their transmitter is located at the Omaha master antenna farm at North 72nd Street and Crown Point.

== History ==
=== Active rock (1991–1996) ===
KFFF started out as "K-Rock", KRRK, on June 10, 1991, which played active rock music. The station broadcast out of the Ranch Bowl, a bowling alley/concert venue.

=== Modern adult contemporary (1996–1999) ===
In late June 1996, the station flipped formats to Modern Adult Contemporary as "The Point", and changed their call letters to KTNP. "The Point" tried to capitalize on the popularity of post-grunge at the time, playing music from bands like Matchbox 20, Goo Goo Dolls and Collective Soul, among others. In addition, KTNP was networked with sister station KKNB in Lincoln, with the stations occasionally simulcasting programming. However, the station suffered from poor ratings, as it struggled to compete against similarly formatted (and a more powerfully signaled) KSRZ.

=== Back to active rock (1999–2004) ===
The station was overwhelmed with requests by fans to go back to being K-Rock, and the station returned to the old format at 4 p.m. on August 12, 1999, and changed to new call letters KRQC. Legal issues caused the station to change their name to "The Dam" at 5 p.m. on New Year's Eve, 2001, but the new rock format remained.

=== Country (2004–present) ===
On March 18, 2004, at 10 a.m., KRQC flipped formats to Classic Country as "US 93.3" with new call letters KHUS. On November 19, 2007, after three days of stunting, it flipped formats again to new country as "93.3 The Twister", and changed their call letters to KTWI.

On December 16, 2011, at 3 p.m., KTWI began stunting with Christmas music, branded as "Jingle 93.3". The station reverted to classic country on January 2, 2012, becoming "93.3 The Wolf". On January 12, 2012, KTWI changed their call letters to KFFF.

== Programming ==
KTWI carried a New Country format between 2008 and 2011 as "Twister 93.3". It was home to Big D and Bubba in the mornings, the Matt and Ben Show in the afternoon and Sadie G. in the evenings. KTWI is the home of Nebraska Cornhuskers Women's volleyball and basketball.

== KFFF-HD2 ==
On October 31, 2014, KFFF launched a Christmas music format on its HD2 sub channel, branded as "Christmas 102.3" (in reference to being relayed on FM translator K272FE 102.3 FM). At Midnight on December 26, 2014, K272FE/KFFF-HD2 (and fellow translator K235CD 94.9 FM, which is relayed on sister station KISO's HD2 sub-channel) flipped to a mainstream rock format as "Rock 94.9/102.3." On May 27, 2016, KFFF-HD2/K272FE split from the simulcast and flipped to Regional Mexican, branded as "102.3 El Patron".

=== Translator ===
Call sign	Frequency	City of license	FID	ERP (W)	HAAT	Class	Transmitter coordinates	FCC info
K272FE	(102.3 MHz) FM	Omaha, Nebraska	138406	99	178 m (584 ft)	D	41°15′25.4″N 95°57′03.8″W	LMS
