= KOIL =

Radio station in Omaha, Nebraska

- Omaha, Nebraska; United States
- Broadcast area: Omaha-Council Bluffs metropolitan area
- Frequency: 1290 kHz
- Branding: News Talk 1290 KOIL

Programming
- Format: Talk radio
- Affiliations: ABC News Radio; Compass Media Networks; Fox News Talk; Premiere Networks; Salem Radio Network; Westwood One; Junior ice hockey; Kansas City Chiefs Radio Network; Omaha Lancers

Ownership
- Owner: Usher Media Group; (Usher Media of Omaha, LLC)
- Sister stations: KOPW; KOZN; KQKQ-FM; KZOT

History
- First air date: July 10, 1925; (original license); December 16, 1976; (interim operation); January 13, 1983; (relicensed)
- Former call signs: KOIL (1925–1993); KKAR (1993–2012)
- Call sign meaning: "Oil" (original owner was the Mona Oil Company of Council Bluffs, Iowa)

Technical information
- Licensing authority: FCC
- Facility ID: 542
- Class: B
- Power: 5,000 watts
- Transmitter coordinates: 41°11′20.0″N 096°00′22.1″W

Links
- Public license information: Public file; LMS
- Webcast: Listen live
- Website: newstalk1290koil.com

KOIL (1290 kHz) is a commercial radio station, licensed to Omaha, Nebraska. It airs a talk radio format and is owned by Usher Media Group. The station's studios are on Dodge Street at 50th Avenue in Midtown Omaha.

KOIL is a Class B station powered at 5,000 watts, it uses a directional antenna with a three-tower array at night to protect other stations on 1290 AM. Its transmitter site is off Harrison Street, near Big Papillion Creek in Bellevue, Nebraska.

== Programming ==
KOIL's schedule is mostly nationally syndicated talk shows. Weekdays begin with two news magazines, America in the Morning with John Trout and This Morning, America's First News with Gordon Deal. The rest of the weekday schedule includes Brian Kilmeade and Friends, The Sean Hannity Show, The Mark Levin Show, The Chris Plante Show, Ground Zero with Clyde Lewis and America at Night with Rich Valdés.

Weekends feature shows on money, health, the law, technology, guns and home repair. Syndicated weekend programs include The Kim Komando Show, Bill Handel on The Law and At Home with Gary Sullivan. KOIL airs live sports including Kansas City Chiefs football and Omaha Lancers junior ice hockey. Most hours begin with an update from ABC News Radio.

== History ==
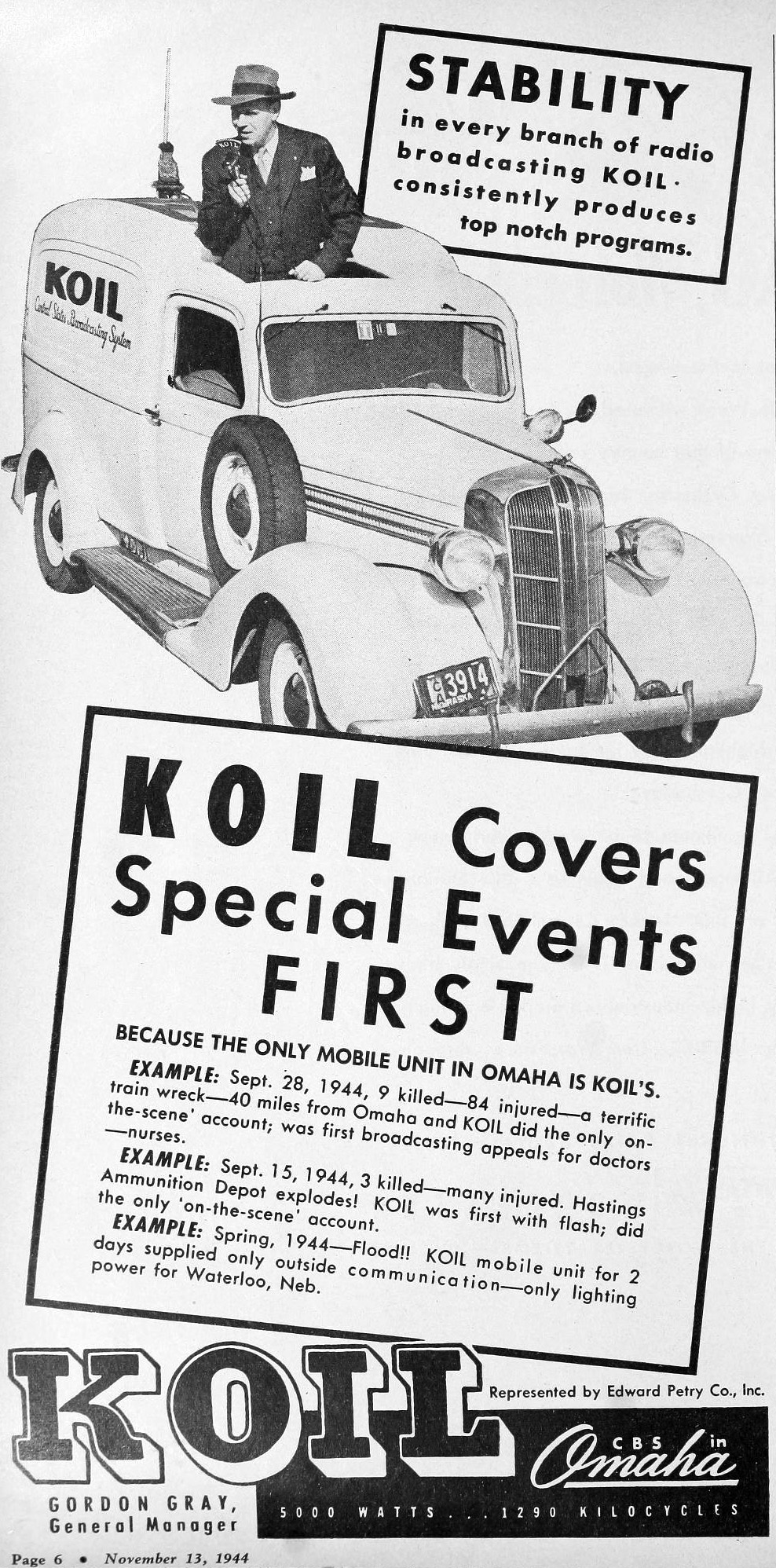
1944 station advertisement.

=== Establishment ===
KOIL was initially licensed to the Monarch Manufacturing Company of Council Bluffs, Iowa on 1080 kHz. Its owner was an oil company, hence the "OIL" in the call letters. It was one of the earliest stations in the Omaha area, and signed on the air on July 10, 1925.

KOIL was one of the stations that participated in the first CBS network radio broadcast on September 18, 1927. On November 11, 1928, with the implementation of the Federal Radio Commission's General Order 40, it was assigned to 1260 kHz. Its affiliation switched to the NBC Blue Network on December 1, 1931. KOIL carried its schedule of dramas, comedies, news and sports during the "Golden Age of Radio". The station moved to Omaha in 1937, and was assigned to 1290 kHz in March 1941, under the provisions of the North American Regional Broadcasting Agreement.

KOIL was purchased by salesman and promoter Don Burden in 1953. As network programming moved from radio to television, the station adopted a Top 40 format. It was a popular station for Omaha's teens and young adults. It became part of Burden's Star Stations.

=== License cancelation ===
The Federal Communications Commission (FCC) began an investigation into allegations involving Burden and his stations. They included reports of bribes Burden made to officials in charge of renewing the licenses of his stations, supervision of on-air contests, and lack of candor with the FCC.

Star Stations was forced to surrender its radio licenses, and KOIL was ordered to go off the air as of 12:01 am. September 2, 1976. The last two songs played by DJ Gene Shaw were Neither One of Us (Wants to Be the First to Say Goodbye) by Gladys Knight & The Pips. This was followed by the very last song, Simon & Garfunkel's "The Sound of Silence." The engineer on duty who turned off the transmitter after 51 years was Don Eliason. On Tom Becka's last segment, he also played the song as he signed off.

=== Interim operation ===
After KOIL's license was canceled, there were multiple applications filed to continue operations, either temporarily under an Interim Operation authorization, or as a relicensed station. On November 24, the FCC awarded an Interim Operation authorization to Beneficial Broadcasting Inc. Beneficial, headed by Nathan Novak, was the sole applicant to apply for only Interim Operation, and also pledged to donate all profits to charity. On December 16, 1976, the station, still KOIL, resumed broadcasting.

=== Relicensing ===
While the Interim Operation of the station was ongoing, the FCC held competitive hearings among the applicants for a permanent relicencing of the station. A May 1981 ruling favored Nebraska-Iowa Broadcasting, but a January 1982 review changed the decision to Omaha Broadcasting. Following a merger of the applicants, the new license was ultimately granted to NewKOIL, Inc., which took over operations on January 13, 1983. Although technically this was a new station, its continued operation as KOIL on 1290 kHz meant that it was considered to be the same station as the original KOIL established in 1925. In February 1988, KOIL was sold to Valley Radio, Inc.. By this point, KOIL aired an oldies format.

In December 1990, KOIL dropped local programming and began airing the "Pure Gold" oldies format from Satellite Music Networks. By May 1993, KOIL was simulcasting FM sister station KXKT, was the Omaha-Council Bluffs affiliate for the Kansas City Royals Radio Network, and aired an evening sports talk show. The station would go off the air for several months due to a lightning strike that caused a fire. In August, after Valley Broadcasting sold the station to Aegeus, Inc. (which was owned in part by John Mitchell, president and principal owner of Mitchell Broadcasting, the owner of KKAR and KQKQ), the station returned to the air, with KOIL moving to 1180 AM (and flipping to an adult standards format), while 1290 AM became KKAR, and adopted a news/talk format.

In April 2003, KKAR moved to 1020 AM, replacing KKSC (now KMMQ). The call sign resumed broadcasting on 1180 kHz in January 2009. On June 4, 2012, KOIL was returned to 1290 AM and rebranded as "The Mighty 1290" KOIL.

On May 8, 2026, NRG Media transferred its Omaha cluster to Usher Media for $2.15 Million.
