= List of television stations in Nebraska =

This is a list of broadcast television stations that are licensed in the U.S. state of Nebraska.

== Full-power ==
- Stations are arranged by media market served and channel position.

Full-power television stations in Nebraska
Media market	Station	Channel	Primary affiliation(s)	Notes	Refs
Grand Island–Hastings–Kearney	KLNE-TV	3	PBS	(Note: Licensed to Lexington, Nebraska.) (Note: Satellite of KUON-TV.)	
Grand Island–Hastings–Kearney	KNHL	5	MyNetworkTV and MeTV, The CW on 18.1	(Note: Licensed to Hastings, Nebraska.)	
Grand Island–Hastings–Kearney	KMNE-TV	7	PBS	(Note: Licensed to Bassett, Nebraska.)	
Grand Island–Hastings–Kearney	KGIN	11	CBS, NBC on 11.2	(Note: Satellite of KOLN.)	
Grand Island–Hastings–Kearney	KHGI-TV	13	ABC, Fox on 13.2	(Note: Licensed to Kearney, Nebraska.)	
Grand Island–Hastings–Kearney	KHNE-TV	29	PBS		
Lincoln	KSNB-TV	4	NBC, CBS on 18.1, The CW on 18.2	(Note: Licensed to York, Nebraska.)	
Lincoln	KLKN	8	ABC		
Lincoln	KOLN	10	CBS, NBC on 10.2		
Lincoln	KUON-TV	12	PBS		
Lincoln	KFXL-TV	51	Fox		
North Platte	KNOP-TV	2	NBC, Fox on 2.2		
North Platte	KWNB-TV	6	ABC, Fox on 6.2	(Note: Licensed to Hayes Center, Nebraska.) (Note: Satellite of KHGI-TV.)	
North Platte	KPNE-TV	9	PBS		
North Platte	KRNE-TV	12	PBS	(Note: Licensed to Merriman, Nebraska.)	
Omaha	KMTV-TV	3	CBS		
Omaha	WOWT	6	NBC		
Omaha	KETV	7	ABC		
Omaha	KXVO	15	Roar		
Omaha	KYNE-TV	26	PBS		
Omaha	KPTM	42	Fox, MyNetworkTV and Dabl on 42.2, The CW on 42.3		
Scottsbluff	KNEP	4	ABC, NBC on 2.1	(Note: Licensed to Sidney, Nebraska.) (Note: Satellite of KOTA-TV.)	
Scottsbluff	KSTF	10	CBS, NBC on 10.2, The CW on 10.3	(Note: Satellite of KGWN-TV.)	
Scottsbluff	KTNE-TV	13	PBS	(Note: Licensed to Alliance, Nebraska.)	
~Sioux City, IA	KXNE-TV	19	PBS	(Note: Licensed to Norfolk, Nebraska.)	
~Goodland, KS	KSNK	8	NBC	(Note: Licensed to McCook, Nebraska.) (Note: Semi-satellite of KSNW.)	

== Low-power ==
Low-power television stations in Nebraska
Media market	Station	Channel	Primary affiliation(s)	Notes	Refs
Grand Island–Hastings–Kearney	KIUA-LD	15	Various	(Note: Licensed to Lincoln, Nebraska.)	
Grand Island–Hastings–Kearney	KMLF-LD	30	Telemundo, News Channel Nebraska on 30.2		
Lincoln	KCWH-LD	18	The CW, CBS on 18.3		
Lincoln	KWBE-LD	21	News Channel Nebraska	(Note: Licensed to Beatrice, Nebraska.)	
Lincoln	KFDY-LD	27	Telemundo, News Channel Nebraska on 27.2		
Lincoln	KAJS-LD	33	Court TV		
Lincoln	KAJS-LD	48	News Channel Nebraska, Telemundo on 48.3	(Note: Licensed to Columbus, Nebraska.)	
North Platte	KNPL-LD	10	CBS		
North Platte	K20NE-D	20	IBN Television		
North Platte	K26CV-D	26	News Channel Nebraska, Telemundo on 26.2	(Note: Licensed to Ogallala, Nebraska.)	
North Platte	KHGI-CD	27	ABC		
North Platte	KMBB-LD	30	Hope Channel		
Omaha	KQMK-LD	25	Infomercials		
Omaha	KOHA-LD	27	Telemundo, News Channel Nebraska on 27.2		
~Sioux City, IA	KNEN-LD	35	News Channel Nebraska, Telemundo on 35.3		
~Goodland, KS	KWNB-LD	29	ABC, Fox on 29.2		

== Translators ==
Television station translators in Nebraska
Media market	Station	Channel	Translating	Notes	Refs
Grand Island–Hastings–Kearney	K23AA-D	7	KHNE-TV	(Note: Licensed to Broken Bow, Nebraska.)	
Grand Island–Hastings–Kearney	K25GM-D	10	KOLN	(Note: Licensed to Newport, Nebraska.)	
Grand Island–Hastings–Kearney	K29MD-D	10	KOLN	(Note: Licensed to O'Neill, Nebraska.)	
Grand Island–Hastings–Kearney	K30FV-D	11	KGIN	(Note: Licensed to Cambridge, Nebraska.)	
Grand Island–Hastings–Kearney	K24GH-D	11	KGIN	(Note: Licensed to Cozad, Nebraska.)	
Lincoln	K33AC-D	12	KUON-TV	(Note: Licensed to Pawnee City, Nebraska.)	
Lincoln	K23AA-D	29	KHNE-TV		
North Platte	K31OC-D	7	KMNE-TV		
North Platte	K20IJ-D	9	KPNE-TV		
North Platte	K33FF-D	10	KNPL-LD	(Note: Licensed to Wallace, Nebraska.)	
North Platte	K28GC-D	11	KGIN	(Note: Licensed to Gothenburg, Nebraska.)	
Omaha	K24GO-D	12	KUON-TV	(Note: Licensed to Blair, Nebraska.)	
Omaha	K25OG-D	12	KUON-TV	(Note: Licensed to Falls City, Nebraska.)	
Omaha	K36QD-D	21	Silent		
Scottsbluff	K06KR-D	13	KTNE-TV	(Note: Licensed to Crawford, Nebraska.)	
Scottsbluff	K06JC-D	13	KTNE-TV	(Note: Licensed to Chadron, Nebraska.)	
Scottsbluff	K08LN-D	13	KTNE-TV	(Note: Licensed to Harrison, Nebraska.)	
Scottsbluff	K10PS-D	27	KLWY		
~Sioux City, IA	K24JG-D	4	KTIV		
~Sioux City, IA	K33OW-D	10	KOLN	(Note: Licensed to Neligh, Nebraska.)	
~Sioux City, IA	K23PU-D	14	KMEG		
~Sioux City, IA	K34IB-D	19	KXNE-TV	(Note: Licensed to Decatur, Nebraska.)	
~Sioux City, IA	K27NI-D	19	KXNE-TV		
~Sioux City, IA	K14MI-D	19	KXNE-TV	(Note: Licensed to Niobrara, Nebraska.)	
~Sioux City, IA	K10JW-D	19	KXNE-TV	(Note: Licensed to Verdigre, Nebraska.)	
~Sioux City, IA	KPTP-LD	44	KPTH		
~Goodland, KS	K33FO-D	9	KPNE-TV	(Note: Licensed to Benkelman, Nebraska.)	
~Goodland, KS	K21OI-D	9	KPNE-TV	(Note: Licensed to McCook and Culbertson, Nebraska.)	

== Defunct ==
- KFOR-TV Lincoln (1953–1954, merged with KOLN-TV)
- KLKE Albion (1996–2003)
- KTUW Scottsbluff (2006–2009)
- KTVG-TV Grand Island (1993–2010)
