= MLB Local Media =

Television broadcasting division of MLB

- Type: Regional sports syndicate

Ownership
- Owner: Major League Baseball
- Key people: Billy Chambers (EVP of local media)

History
- Launched: May 31, 2023; 3 years ago

MLB Local Media is a division of Major League Baseball that produces and distributes regional television broadcasts. Established prior to the 2023 season, and leveraging resources from MLB Network, the division currently holds the local media rights to 14 of MLB's 30 teams, as well as one team in the National Hockey League (NHL).

The division was established in 2023 amid uncertainties in the regional sports network market, with the intended capability of taking over a team's regional media rights on short notice if their respective broadcaster is no longer able to carry their games. The division made its on-air debut on May 31, 2023, when it took over broadcast rights to the San Diego Padres from Bally Sports San Diego after the latter missed a rights payment. In July 2023, MLB also took over the rights to the Arizona Diamondbacks from Bally Sports Arizona under similar circumstances.

In 2024, MLB Local Media added the Colorado Rockies amid the winddown of AT&T SportsNet, and started producing MLB Sunday Leadoff with its move to The Roku Channel. It acquired the rights to the Cleveland Guardians, Minnesota Twins, and Seattle Mariners in 2025, albeit with the Mariners continuing to be distributed via its co-owned Root Sports Northwest under a transitional arrangement before closing at the conclusion of the season. MLB Local Media would add eight additional teams for 2026, including the Washington Nationals (following the resolution of its long-standing rights disputes with the Baltimore Orioles' MASN), and seven teams that were formerly broadcast by FanDuel Sports Network (formerly Bally Sports, amid continued financial issues and an anticipated winddown of the networks). As part of its agreement with the Detroit Tigers, the division also began producing broadcasts for its sister NHL team, the Detroit Red Wings, beginning in the 2026–27 NHL season.

MLB Local Media regional broadcasts are distributed via ad-hoc agreements with television providers in each team's home market, as well as over-the-top (OTT) subscription packages hosted by MLB.tv (branded under names such as Padres.tv and DBacks.tv), available separately from MLB.tv's out-of-market service. Beginning in the 2025 season, MLB Local Media also began to syndicate packages of broadcasts to terrestrial television stations in the teams' local markets.

== History ==
=== Background ===
On February 24, 2023, Warner Bros. Discovery, owners of the AT&T SportsNet regional sports networks, announced that it would leave the RSN business. At the time, AT&T SportsNet held the rights to three MLB teams: the Pittsburgh Pirates, Colorado Rockies and Houston Astros. The company sent messages to those teams, notifying them they had until March 31 to reach an agreement to take their rights back or acquire the networks. If no deal was made before the deadline, Warner Bros. Discovery stated that the channels would go into Chapter 7 bankruptcy liquidation. Root Sports Northwest, a joint venture between Warner Bros. Discovery and the Seattle Mariners, was not affected by the announcement. Despite the March deadline, Major League Baseball negotiated a deal with Warner Bros. Discovery to keep the networks operational through the 2023 Major League Baseball season. The Houston and Pittsburgh networks would be sold to joint ventures of their respective teams, while WBD would later sell its stake in Root Sports to the Mariners.

On March 14, 2023, Main Street Sports Group (at the time known as Diamond Sports Group), owners of the Bally Sports regional sports networks, filed for Chapter 11 bankruptcy. The filing came 30 days after the company failed to make a $140M interest payment. At the time, Diamond Sports held the rights to 14 MLB teams: the Arizona Diamondbacks, Atlanta Braves, Cincinnati Reds, Cleveland Guardians, Detroit Tigers, Kansas City Royals, Miami Marlins, Milwaukee Brewers, Minnesota Twins, San Diego Padres, St. Louis Cardinals, Tampa Bay Rays and Texas Rangers.

=== Launch ===
In January 2023, MLB hired Billy Chambers — a former executive of Bally Sports' predecessor Fox Sports Networks — as its executive vice president of local media; Commissioner of Baseball Rob Manfred stated that Chambers would "play an integral role in how we navigate the rapidly evolving local media landscape in the future". In March 2023, MLB Local Media was formally established, with the hiring of former SportsNet Pittsburgh executive Doug Johnson, and former Bally Sports executives Greg Pennell and Kendall Burgess; all three would report to Chambers. It was anticipated that the group could take over broadcasts of teams under AT&T SportsNet or Bally Sports on short notice if they are unable to continue their relationships with the teams; MLB Local Media had been working with MLB Network staff to prepare for such a scenario, including adapting an existing MLB Network graphics package so that it could be readily customized for individual teams.

In May 2023, Diamond Sports was on the verge of missing a second straight rights payment to the San Diego Padres, with a grace period expiring on the 31st; the rights to the team would revert to Major League Baseball on this date if the deadline were missed. Chambers and the MLB Local Media team were on standby for the Padres' series at the Miami Marlins, and began preparing its production on May 30, with only 24 hours' notice. The new broadcasting arrangements would involve ad-hoc agreements between MLB and individual television providers in the San Diego Padres' market, as well as an over-the-top, in-market subscription package hosted on the MLB.tv platform known as Padres.tv. The service is a separate subscription from MLB.tv's out-of-market service.

The MLB-produced telecasts inherited the Padres' existing broadcast team and other team-contracted staff. Once the team returned to San Diego, MLB Local Media inherited the mobile production units and freelance employees that had been used by Diamond. MLB Local Media aimed for the broadcasts' technological aspects to be at parity with those of the previous Bally productions, while also increasing use of new technology such as shallow depth-of-field cameras. The inaugural broadcast featured a special introduction narrated by sportscaster and MLB Network contributor Bob Costas.

On June 22, 2023, Diamond announced its intention to reject its contract with the Arizona Diamondbacks on June 30, 2023. Diamond and the Arizona Diamondbacks later released a joint statement pushing back the hearing and agreeing to continue Diamond's broadcast of Diamondbacks' games. The contract was officially rejected on July 18. As with the Padres, MLB Local Media took over production. Over the season, MLB Local Media began to deploy additional cameras, including gimbal cameras, wirecams, and umpire cams, and also began to focus on increasing access to players in-game via microphones.

=== 2024 expansion ===
For the 2024 season, MLB Local Media announced they would also produce and distribute games for the Colorado Rockies, who formerly aired games on the now-defunct AT&T SportsNet Rocky Mountain. In addition, the broadcasts began to receive access to programming such as Minor League Baseball games and the MLB Big Inning whiparound show in the event of weather delays. The three teams received updates to their graphics to add additional team-specific elements, and move the score bug to the bottom-right of the screen following feedback from directors. In May 2024, MLB Local Media also began to oversee production of the MLB Sunday Leadoff package with its move to The Roku Channel.

=== 2025 expansion ===
MLB Local Media began producing and distributing telecasts for the Cleveland Guardians and Minnesota Twins in the 2025 season. The department also began production of Seattle Mariners games, although the telecasts continued to be broadcast on Root Sports Northwest.

Two teams announced, then backed out of, agreements to move to MLB Local Media in 2025. The Milwaukee Brewers had announced a move to MLB Local Media in October 2024, but on December 31, 2024, the Brewers announced that they had renegotiated their contract and would remain on FanDuel Sports Network Wisconsin for the 2025 season. The Cincinnati Reds mutually agreed to end its agreement with Diamond and FanDuel Sports Network Ohio in November 2024, but on January 13, 2025, the team announced that they had renegotiated to remain FanDuel Sports Network in the 2025 season.

On March 26, 2025, the Diamondbacks, Padres, and Rockies announced that they would simulcast a package of games on Tegna stations in each team's home market (KPNX, KFMB and its DT2 subchannel, and the KUSA/KTVD duopoly respectively); the Twins would later announce a similar simulcast deal with Minneapolis-St. Paul Fox station KMSP-TV and Gray Media stations in the Twins' outer markets, with the Guardians following with Tegna's WKYC in Cleveland. Ahead of the 2025 season, MLB announced that Progressive Insurance would serve as presenting sponsor for Diamondbacks and Twins broadcasts.

=== 2026 expansion ===
In September 2025, the Mariners announced that Root Sports Northwest would close following the conclusion of the 2025 season, and that MLB Local Media would take over distribution of its regional broadcasts beginning in 2026. The rights to Sunday Leadoff would move back to NBC Sports that season, as part of its new three-year contract with the league.

On January 14, 2026, it was announced that the Washington Nationals had signed with MLB Local Media, after having previously settled a long-standing rights dispute with the Baltimore Orioles and MASN.

On January 8, 2026, it was reported that Main Street Sports Group's nine remaining MLB contracts had been terminated due to missed payments, amid financial uncertainties and an effort to sell the company. The Milwaukee Brewers, St. Louis Cardinals, Miami Marlins, Tampa Bay Rays, Cincinnati Reds, and Kansas City Royals announced on February 2 that they would move to MLB Local Media for the 2026 season.

The Detroit Tigers later announced a move from FanDuel Sports Network Detroit to MLB Local Media. As part of the agreement, MLB Local Media agreed to also provide production and distribution support for the NHL's Detroit Red Wings, which, like the Tigers, are owned by Ilitch Sports + Entertainment. On March 2, Ilitch announced that the two teams would share a branded channel known as Detroit SportsNet, becoming the first MLB Local Media operation to be a part-time RSN with multiple teams.

== Current regional broadcast rights ==
MLB Local Media's broadcasts are distributed primarily via a "direct-to-distributor" model, in which it negotiates directly with television providers in the teams' local markets to carry the games. The broadcasts are carried by part-time channels on each provider, such as an event channel or similar; on Cox Cable for example, Padres games were assigned to the channel space of YurView California (which coincidentally, as the former 4SD, was the Padres' regional broadcaster prior to their move to Fox Sports Networks/Bally Sports) The channels' programming are limited to the games themselves, pre-game and post-game shows, as well as encores of games, with the channels becoming inactive outside of these programs.

Each team under MLB Local Media also offers an in-market direct-to-consumer streaming package. These services are hosted by the MLB.tv platform and separate from its out-of-market service, but users can optionally subscribe to both services in a bundle. Over subsequent seasons, MLB.tv partnered with other teams and third-party regional broadcasters to offer in-market streaming services on MLB.tv as well, as part of a goal to have as many of the league's teams available on the service as possible.

MLB Local Media operates under a revenue sharing approach rather than a traditional rights fee, with the unit handling production (using team-employed contract workers and commentators, where applicable), advertising sales, and distribution/carriage negotiations. Revenue from the broadcasts are distributed to participating teams, with MLB taking a cut to cover production costs. Teams that moved to MLB Local Media have generally seen a reduction in television revenue in comparison to their previous contracts with RSNs, with the St. Louis Cardinals having been projected to lose $20 million in revenue under MLB Local Media in comparison to the $60 million they previously had with Main Street Sports Group in 2025 (which itself had been cut by 25% as part of a renegotiation with the company).

Team	Distributor/Service	Over-the-air affiliates (limited games only)
Arizona Diamondbacks (2023–present)	DBacks.tv presented by Progressive	KPNX (Phoenix); KMSB (Tucson); KOB (Albuquerque); KSL (Salt Lake City)
San Diego Padres (2023–present)	Padres.tv presented by UC San Diego Health	KFMB (San Diego); KESQ/KPSP-CD/KCWQ-LD (Palm Springs); XHJK-TDT (Tijuana)
Colorado Rockies (2024–present)	Rockies.tv presented by bet365	KUSA/KTVD (Denver); KKTV (Colorado Springs); KSL (Salt Lake City); KGWN (Cheyenne, Wyoming); KCWY-DT (Casper, Wyoming)
Cleveland Guardians (2025–present)	CLEGuardians.tv presented by Progressive	WKYC (Cleveland); WSEE-TV (Erie, Pennsylvania); WBNS-DT2 (Columbus); WTVG/DT2 (Toledo, Ohio)
Minnesota Twins (2025–present)	Twins.tv presented by Progressive	KMSP-TV (Minneapolis–Saint Paul); KXLT-TV/KTTC/DT2 (Rochester); KDLH/KBJR-TV (Duluth–Superior); KEYC-TV/KMNF-LD (Mankato); KXJB-LD/KVLY-TV (Fargo–Moorhead); KFYR-TV (Bismarck, North Dakota); KEVN-LD (Rapid City, South Dakota); KDLT-TV (Sioux Falls, South Dakota); KCRG-TV/DT2 (Cedar Rapids, Iowa); KWQC-DT3 (Davenport, Iowa–Quad Cities); KYOU-TV (Ottumwa, Iowa); KTIV (Sioux City, Iowa)
Seattle Mariners (2025–present)	Root Sports Northwest (2025); Mariners.tv (2026–present)	KING-TV (Seattle); KGW (Portland); KREM and KSKN (Spokane, Washington); KTVB (Boise, Idaho); KAPP and KVEW (Yakima and the Tri-Cities, Washington); KLSR-TV and KEVU-CD (Eugene, Oregon); KIFI-DT3 (Idaho Falls, Idaho); KTFT (Twin Falls, Idaho); KULR-TV (Billings, Montana); KWYB (Butte–Bozeman, Montana); KFBB-TV (Great Falls, Montana); KHBB (Helena, Montana); KTMF (Missoula, Montana); KTUU-TV and KAUU (Anchorage, Alaska); KFXF-CD (Fairbanks, Alaska); KUBD (TV) (Juneau, Alaska); KGMB and KHNL-DT2 (Honolulu)
Cincinnati Reds (2026-present)	Reds.tv	WXIX-TV/DT3 (Newport, Kentucky–Cincinnati); WAVE/DT3 (Louisville); WDEM-CD (Columbus); WTVG/DT2 (Toledo, Ohio); WKYT-DT2 (Lexington); WBKO-DT3 (Bowling Green, Kentucky); WFIE-DT2 (Evansville, Indiana); WPTA (Fort Wayne, Indiana); WNDU-DT3 (South Bend, Indiana); WSAZ-TV/WQCW (Huntington, West Virginia–Charleston–Portsmouth); WVLT-TV/WBXX-TV (Knoxville, Tennessee); WSMV/DT2 (Nashville); WMC-DT3 (Memphis); WBTV (Charlotte); WHNS (Greenville–Spartanburg, SC–Asheville, North Carolina)
Detroit Tigers (2026-present); Detroit Red Wings (NHL, 2026-present)	Detroit SportsNet presented by Bet365; Tigers.TV	WJBK-TV (Detroit); WNEM-TV/DT2 (Flint–Saginaw–Bay City); WILX (Lansing); WOOD-TV/WOTV/WXSP-CD (Grand Rapids); WTVG/DT2 (Toledo, Ohio); WWTV/WFQX-TV (Cadillac–Traverse City–Northern Michigan); WNDU-TV (South Bend, Indiana); WLUC-TV/DT2 (Marquette-Escanaba-Houghton)
Kansas City Royals (2026–present)	Royals.tv	KCTV-TV/KSMO-TV (Kansas City); KAIT-DT3 (Jonesboro, Arkansas); KWCH-DT/KSCW-DT (Wichita, Kansas); WIBW-TV (Topeka, Kansas); KMIZ-DT3 (Columbia); KFJX-DT2 (Joplin); KYCW-LD (Springfield); KFVS-DT2 (Cape Girardeau); WOWT-DT2 (Omaha); KYOU-TV/DT3 (Ottumwa, Iowa); KWQC-TV/DT3 (Davenport–Quad Cities); KCRG-TV/DT2/DT3 (Cedar Rapids, Iowa); KTIV-DT2/DT3 (Sioux City, Iowa); KOLN/KSNB-TV/DT2/KCWH-LD (Lincoln, Nebraska); KNPL-LD/DT2/KIIT-DT2/KNOP-TV (North Platte, Nebraska); KSBI (Oklahoma City)
Miami Marlins (2026–present)	Marlins.tv	WBFS-TV/WFOR-TV (Miami–Fort Lauderdale); WPBF (West Palm Beach); WZVN-TV/WBBH-TV (Fort Myers–Naples); WRDQ-TV/WFTV-TV (Daytona Beach–Orlando–Clermont)
Milwaukee Brewers (2026–present)	Brewers.tv presented by Potawatomi Sportsbook	WITI (Milwaukee); WISC-TV/DT2 (Madison); WJMN-TV Escanaba–Marquette, Michigan; WACY-TV/WGBA-TV (Green Bay–Fox Cities); WKBT-DT/DT2 (La Crosse–Eau Claire); KDLH/KBJR-TV (Duluth–Superior); WSAW-TV/DT4/WZAW-LD (Wausau–Rhinelander)
St. Louis Cardinals (2026–present)	Cardinals.tv	KMOV/Matrix Midwest (St. Louis); KFVS-TV/DT2 (Cape Girardeau–Paducah, Kentucky); KYTV/KSPR-LD/KYCW-LD (Springfield); KAIT/DT2 (Jonesboro, Arkansas); WBXC-CD (Champaign, Illinois); WEEK-TV/DT2/DT3 (Peoria, Illinois); WGEM-DT2 (Quincy, Illinois); WIFR-LD/WSLN (Rockford, Illinois); WFIE/DT2 (Evansville, Indiana); KCRG-TV/DT3 (Cedar Rapids, Iowa); KWQC-TV/DT3/DT4 (Davenport–Quad Cities); KTIV/DT2/DT3 (Sioux City, Iowa); WMC-TV/DT3 (Memphis); KSBI (Oklahoma City); KOTV-DT3 (Tulsa, Oklahoma)
Tampa Bay Rays (2026–present)	Rays.tv	WMOR (Bradenton–Tampa); WBBH-TV/WZVN-TV (Fort Myers); WCJB-TV (Gainesville); WJAX-TV/WFOX-TV (Jacksonville); WPLG (Miami–Fort Lauderdale); WESH/WKCF (Daytona Beach–Orlando–Clermont); WJHG-TV (Panama City, Florida); WALA-TV (Mobile, Alabama–Pensacola); WCTV (Tallahassee); WPBF (West Palm Beach)
Washington Nationals (2026–present)	Nationals.tv	WTTG/WDCA (Washington, D.C.); WVIR-TV (Charlottesville, Virginia); WSVW-LD/WSVF-CD/WHSV-TV (Harrisonburg, Virginia); WWBT/WUPV (Richmond, Virginia); WDBJ/WZBJ (Roanoke, Virginia); WITN-TV (Greenville–New Bern, North Carolina); WRAL-TV/WRAZ (Raleigh, North Carolina); WECT (Wilmington, North Carolina)

== Similar efforts by other leagues ==
In the 2026–27 NHL season, the NHL launched its own regional production hub operating under its NHL Productions division, which is led by former MLB Network president Rob McGlarry as GM of local media. The hub served six teams upon its establishment, with distribution primarily via Amazon Prime Video. The National Basketball Association established a similar in-house media operation ahead of the 2026–27 NBA season to serve most former FDSN teams and the NBA's proposed "streaming hub", led by former ESPN and NESN executive Matt Volk.

== See also ==
- Other MLB television packages produced in-house by units of Major League Baseball:
  - The Baseball Network
  - MLB Network Showcase
  - Friday Night Baseball
