= 2018 in American television network changes =

The following are lists of changes to American television networks, including changes of station affiliations, that occurred in 2018.

== Networks and services ==
=== Network launches ===
Network	Type	Launch date	Notes	Source
Quest	Over-the-air multicast	January 29	A partnership of Tegna, Inc. and Cooper Media, Quest offers factual programming concerning science, nature, engineering, and history, mainly from programming formerly seen on Discovery Channel and History. The network initially launched primarily on subchannels of stations owned and/or operated by Tegna, Univision Communications and Entravision Communications.	
ESPN+	Over-the-top streaming service	April 12	A subscription add-on service which includes sports-based original talk shows and documentaries, combat sports, college sports (including exclusive coverage of Ivy League events), cricket, rugby union, soccer (including out-of-market Major League Soccer matches), and tennis, with NHL and MLB games offered as add-ons.	
Start TV	Over-the-air multicast	September 3	Owned by Weigel Broadcasting and announced on July 18, Start TV will offer a mix of female-led police and legal procedural dramas (with an initial schedule that includes The Closer, The Good Wife, Medium, Crossing Jordan, Cold Case and Profiler). The network will initially launch primarily on subchannels of stations owned by CBS Television Stations serving as the launch group, displacing Weigel/CBS's three-year-old sister network Decades. Bahakel Communications and Weigel (the latter of which will assume the affiliation rights to Decades displaced by the Start TV launch on stations it owns in certain CBS/CW O&O markets, including Los Angeles and Chicago) will also contribute stations to serve as charter affiliates.	
DC Universe	Over-the-top streaming service	September 15	Announced in April 2017, DC Universe features a broad array of original programming as well as older DC live-action and animated films and animated series, a rotating selection of comics, forum discussion space, a merchandise store, and a DC encyclopedia.	
CBN News Channel	Over-the-air multicast/OTT streaming	October 1	Owned by the Christian Broadcasting Network, the 24-hour news channel – which marks the return of CBN to broadcast television ownership since it sold its last independent station, KXTX-TV/Dallas–Fort Worth, in 2000, and its first network venture since it sold the cable-originated CBN Family Channel (now Freeform) to International Family Entertainment in 1990 – debuted as a subchannel service available on full-power and low-power television stations in 15 U.S. cities (on stations owned by Nexstar Media Group and HC2 Holdings) as well as through a live stream on a dedicated website and the CBN News app. CBN News Channel's programming will consist of original produced news, lifestyle and entertainment content and commentary.	
Spectrum News 1 networks	Regional cable	October 28 (Kentucky); November 7 (Ohio); November 16 (Southern California); November 28 (Wisconsin)	In an August 18 article in the Los Angeles Times, Charter Communications disclosed it is launching a 24-hour regional news channel serving the Los Angeles area in November. The El Segundo-based channel's format will rely less on crime and police pursuits commonly found on broadcast stations in the Los Angeles area, and include a focus on long-form stories (including documentaries or investigative reports) and community issues and events typically not focused upon on other local television news outlets in the market, along with national and business news stories contributed by the flagship of Spectrum News, NY1, and a Washington bureau. Charter has hired about 125 employees for the planned channel. Additional new regional news networks for Spectrum's clusters in Wisconsin, Ohio, and an upgrade of Spectrum News Kentucky (the former cn|2; that network relaunched October 28) have also launched under the same model.	

=== Network conversions and rebrandings ===
Old network name	New network name	Type	Conversion date	Notes	Source
Spike	Paramount Network	Cable and satellite	January 18	Spike relaunched as the Paramount Network on January 18, with the new identity being formally introduced with a special live episode of Lip Sync Battle that evening. Announced by Viacom in February 2017 as part of a corporate restructuring plan initiated by Viacom CEO Bob Bakish to refocus most of its media assets around six flagship brands (with MTV, Comedy Central, Nickelodeon, the Nick Jr. Channel and BET as the other associated brands), the change realigns the general entertainment cable channel to be more closely associated with sister film studio Paramount Pictures. Paramount Network will maintain some of the former Spike's existing programming including original series (such as Lip Sync Battle, Ink Master and Bar Rescue) and feature films, along with newer original programs (including the family drama Yellowstone; a television version of the dark comedy Heathers was shelved for several months after low critical acclaim for pre-screened episodes, the Stoneman Douglas High School shooting, and the company's concern for its dark mature content, before being re-edited and trimmed for a week-long unspooling in late October).	
NewsChannel 8	WJLA 24/7 News	Regional cable (D.C.-Maryland-Virginia)	July 24	Occurring on the fourth anniversary of the FCC's approval of its purchase of founding parent Allbritton Communications, Sinclair Broadcast Group rebrands its Washington, D.C.-based regional cable news channel to highlight its shared resources with ABC affiliate WJLA-TV (which founded the channel under Allbritton ownership in October 1991). As part of the rebrand, the channel moves towards a Bloomberg Television/CP24-esque presentation of a smaller video picture augmented by continuous graphical weather, news and traffic information below it and to the right.	
Velocity	Motor Trend	Cable and satellite	November 23	Discovery, Inc. re-brands their automotive interest network Velocity (which launched in 2002 as Discovery HD Theater, an early high definition demonstration network and re-branded as Velocity in 2011 as most cable networks had associated HD simulcasts) as Motor Trend, using the title and goodwill of Motor Trend magazine, with little change in on-air programming outside of more Motor Trend-branded programming. Discovery and Motor Trend owner Source Interlink launched a joint venture called Motor Trend Group in 2017, allowing the rebranding.	

=== Network closures ===
Network	Type	End date	Notes	Source
Spectrum Deportes	Regional cable (Southern California) and DirecTV (National)	August 15	Charter Communications closes the Spanish-language version of Spectrum SportsNet in the Los Angeles market after almost six years of service, due to low ratings and revenue. Spanish-language play-by-play audio will remain available on the main Spectrum SportsNet channel via the second audio program option.	
DramaFever	OTT streaming/digital content	October 16	Founded in 2009, the multi–platform service, which provided a lineup of over 13,000 episodes from 60 content partners across 12 countries consisting of K-dramas, Asian TV shows and movies, and Latin American telenovelas, immediately shut down operations (and about 20% of the unit's 110 employees pink-slipped), which comes just two years after it was acquired by Warner Bros. from Japan's SoftBank Group and has operated as a unit of Warner Bros. Digital Networks, which has touted the streaming infrastructure and expertise it obtained through the acquisition. The shutdown also comes in the wake of AT&T's acquisition of Time Warner and the formation of WarnerMedia. CEO John Stankey said the company would launch a broad subscription-streaming entertainment service anchored by HBO that would pull in content from other parts of Time Warner. Another factor was licensing costs for U.S. distribution commanded by top K-dramas have rapidly increased in recent years, as well as competitive bids by Netflix and Amazon made it unsustainable, as licensing shows that used to cost $800,000 now goes for around $1 million. On its website, statement reads "Thank you for nine great years. As of October 16, 2018 DramaFever has been shut down... While this decision is difficult, there are a variety of business reasons that have led to this conclusion... We'll be issuing refunds as applicable, and subscribers will receive an email from us with details in the coming days."	

== Television stations ==
=== Station launches ===
Date	Market	Station	Channel	Affiliation	Source
January 1	Bowling Green, Kentucky	WNKY-DT3	40.3	MeTV	
January 24	Ottumwa, Iowa	KYOU-DT4	15.4	Escape	
January 29	Little Rock, Arkansas	KTHV-DT4	11.4	Quest	
January 29	Mesa, Arizona (Phoenix)	KPNX-DT4	12.4	Quest	
January 29	Bakersfield, California	KUVI-DT2	45.2	Quest	
January 29	Los Angeles, California	KMEX-DT5	34.5	Quest	
January 29	Sacramento, California	KXTV-DT4	10.4	Quest	
January 29	Denver, Colorado	KUSA-DT5	9.5	Quest	
January 29	Hollywood, Florida (Miami)	WAMI-DT5	69.5	Quest	
January 29	Melbourne, Florida (Orlando)	WVEN-DT5	43.5	Quest	
January 29	Orange Park (Jacksonville)	WJXX-DT3	25.3	Quest	
January 29	Tampa/St. Petersburg, Florida	WTSP-DT4	10.4	Quest	
January 29	Atlanta, Georgia	WXIA-DT4	11.4	Quest	
January 29	Boise, Idaho	KTVB-DT4	7.4	Quest	
January 29	Portland, Maine	WCSH-DT4	6.4	Quest	
January 29	Grand Rapids, Michigan	WZZM-DT4	13.4	Quest	
January 29	Minneapolis/St. Paul, Minnesota	KARE-DT4	11.4	Quest	
January 29	St. Louis, Missouri	KSDK-DT4	5.4	Quest	
January 29	Albuquerque/ Santa Fe, New Mexico	KLUZ-DT2	14.2	Quest	
January 29	Buffalo, New York	WGRZ-DT4	2.4	Quest	
January 29	Charlotte, North Carolina	WCNC-DT4	36.4	Quest	
January 29	Greensboro/Winston-Salem/ High Point, North Carolina	WFMY-DT4	2.4	Quest	
January 29	Cleveland, Ohio	WKYC-DT4	3.4	Quest	
January 29	Portland, Oregon	KGW-DT4	8.4	Quest	
January 29	Philadelphia, Pennsylvania	WFPA-CD3	28.3	Quest	
January 29	Columbia, South Carolina	WLTX-DT4	19.4	Quest	
January 29	Knoxville, Tennessee	WBIR-DT4	10.4	Quest	
January 29	Austin, Texas	KVUE-DT4	24.4	Quest	
January 29	Dallas/Fort Worth, Texas	WFAA-DT4	8.4	Quest	
January 29	Houston, Texas	KHOU-DT4	11.4	Quest	
January 29	San Antonio, Texas	KENS-DT4	5.4	Quest	
January 29	Wolfforth/Lubbock, Texas	KLCW-DT4	22.4	Quest	
January 29	Hampton/Norfolk/ Virginia Beach, Virginia	WVEC-DT4	13.4	Quest	
January 29	Seattle, Washington	KING-DT3	5.3	Quest	
January 29	Spokane, Washington	KSKN-DT3	22.3	Quest	
March 8	Milwaukee, Wisconsin	WTMJ-DT4	4.4	Grit	
April 2	Portland, Maine	WPXT	51.4	Escape (moved from WPXT-DT3)	
April 2	Portland, Maine	WPXT	51.5	Laff (moved from WPME-DT3)	
May 28	Baytown, Texas (Houston)	KUBE-DT7	57.7	This TV	
July 11	Detroit, Michigan	WKBD-DT2	50.2	Comet	
July 11	Detroit, Michigan	WKBD-DT3	50.3	Charge!	
August 1	Philadelphia, Pennsylvania	WPSG-DT2	57.2	Charge!	
August 1	Philadelphia, Pennsylvania	WPSG-DT3	57.3	Comet	
August 3	Pittsburg, Kansas (Joplin, Missouri)	KFJX-DT2	14.2	The CW (Note: These over-the-air CW Plus affiliates replaced cable-only affiliates of the programming service; KFJX-DT2 replaced Cable One-owned "KSXF", WNBJ-LD2 replaced Spectrum-owned "WBJK," KAIT-DT3 replaced "KJOS" (owned by various cable providers in the Jonesboro market) and KIIT-CD2 replaced "KWPL" (owned by various cable systems in the North Platte market).)	
August 6	Jackson, Tennessee	WNBJ-LD2	39.2	The CW	
September 1	Jonesboro, Arkansas	KAIT-DT3	8.3	The CW	
September 1	Reno, Nevada	KOLO-DT3	8.3	The CW	
September 1	Milwaukee, Wisconsin	WYTU-LD3	63.3	Movies!	
September 3	Bellingham, Washington	KVOS-DT5	12.5	Start TV	
September 3	Cedar City, Utah (Salt Lake City)	KCSG-DT3	8.3	Start TV	
September 3	Charlotte, North Carolina	WCCB-DT5	18.5	Start TV	
September 3	Chicago, Illinois	WCIU-DT6	26.6	Decades |	
September 3	Columbia, South Carolina	WOLO-DT5	25.5	Start TV	
September 3	Los Angeles, California	KAZA-DT2	54.2	Decades	
September 3	Philadelphia, Pennsylvania	KJWP-DT6	2.6	Decades	
September 3	Pittsburgh, Pennsylvania	WOSC-CD5	61.5	Decades	
September 3	Rockford, Illinois	WFBN-LD3	35.3	Start TV	
September 3	St. Louis, Missouri	KNLC-DT6	24.6	Start TV	
September 3	Seattle–Tacoma, Washington	KFFV-DT4	44.4	Decades	
October 1	Lubbock, Texas	KAMC-DT4	28.4	CBN News Channel	
October 1	Norfolk, Virginia	WAVY-DT4	10.4	CBN News Channel	
October 1	North Platte, Nebraska	KIIT-CD2	11.2	The CW (simulcast of KCWH-LD/Lincoln, Nebraska)	(see KCWH-LD entry in "Major affiliation changes" section for further details)
October 1	Oklahoma City, Oklahoma	KSBI-DT2	52.2	Bounce TV	
October 1	Oklahoma City, Oklahoma	KSBI-DT3	52.3	Laff	
October 1	Oklahoma City, Oklahoma	KSBI-DT4	52.4	Grit	
October 1	Oklahoma City, Oklahoma	KSBI-DT5	52.5	Escape	
October 1	Springfield, Missouri	KOLR-DT4	10.4	CBN News Channel	
October 1	Texarkana, Texas (Shreveport, Louisiana)	KTAL-DT4	6.4	CBN News Channel	
October 22	Charleston, South Carolina	WGWG-DT3	34.3	Antenna TV	
October 22	Dalton, Georgia (Chattanooga, Tennessee)	WDGA-CD2	43.2	Antenna TV	
October 31	Des Moines, Iowa	KRPG-LD	43.1	Azteca America	
November 12	Green Bay, Wisconsin	WBAY-DT4	2.4	Start TV	
November 12	Wausau, Wisconsin	WZAW-LD4	33.4	Laff	
November 12	Wausau, Wisconsin	WZAW-LD5	33.5	Stadium	
December 15	San Francisco, California	KBCW-DT3	44.3	MeTV	
December 15	San Francisco, California	KBCW-DT4	44.4	TBD	
December 22	Detroit, Michigan	WKBD-DT4	50.4	TBD	

=== Stations changing network affiliation ===
==== Major affiliation changes ====
This section outlines affiliation changes involving English and Spanish language networks (ABC, NBC, CBS, Fox, PBS, The CW, Univision, etc.), and format conversions involving independent stations. Digital subchannels will only be mentioned if the prior or new affiliation involves a major English and Spanish broadcast network or a locally programmed independent entertainment format.

Date	Market	Station	Channel	Prioraffiliation	Newaffiliation	Notes	Source
January 1	Elko, Nevada (Salt Lake City)	KENV-DT	10.1	NBC	Comet	In December 2017, Sinclair Broadcast Group received notice from NBC that KENV (which had been operating as a Semi-satellite of KRNV-DT/Reno) will lose its affiliation with the network once its contract expires on December 31, in order to give network exclusivity in eastern Nevada to KSL-TV/Salt Lake City (of which Elko is based within that city's designated market area). As a result, KENV will shut down its news department, as the loss of the NBC affiliation will make it cost-prohibitive to continue producing locally based programming. KENV will subsequently affiliate with the Sinclair-owned/Metro-Goldwyn-Mayer-operated science fiction network Comet. The local translator district around Elko has attempted to communicate with NBC their preference for KRNV to be used as the local source for NBC programming in the area, but the network has stood firm that KSL-TV should be the exclusive affiliate in the area and will require the district to utilize KSL-TV as their signal source.	
January 1	Avalon, California (Los Angeles)	KAZA-TV	54.1	Azteca América	MeTV	In December 2017, Costa de Oro Media announced that KJLA would become the Azteca América affiliate for the Los Angeles market on January 3, 2018. The move as well as a station sale that occurred concurrently resulted in KAZA-TV – which an 80/20 venture between Pappas Telecasting and TV Azteca sold for $9 million in September 2017 to Weigel Broadcasting – replacing Anaheim-based KDOC-DT3 (channel 56.3) as the station for MeTV in the market as an O&O, upon consummation of the Weigel sale (KDOC-DT3 will continue to serve as the MeTV affiliate for southern portions of the market). KVMD switched from a non-commercial Spanish religious to a commercial Spanish schedule, replacing KJLA – which had been the network's only owned-and-operated station since it became a national network in April 2007 – as the market's LATV affiliate. Although it did not officially switch to Azteca until January 3, KJLA began carrying the majority of the network's programming on January 1 (except for those which aired during time periods KJLA had ceded to air religious programming).	
January 3	Twentynine Palms, California (Los Angeles)	KVMD	31.1	Almavision	LATV		
January 3	Ventura, California (Los Angeles)	KJLA	57.1	LATV	Azteca América		
January 18	Nashua, New Hampshire (Boston)	WYCN-CD	15.1 & 15.2	Heroes & Icons	NBC (DT1) Cozi TV (DT2)	OTA Broadcasting sold the spectrum allocated to WYCN-CD in the auction for $80.4 million and entered into a channel sharing agreement with Boston PBS member station WGBX-TV, contingent on a sale of the station to the NBC Owned Television Stations division of NBCUniversal. Despite WYCN's low-power status and city of license, its placement on the full-power signal of WGBX allowed NBC's "NBC Boston" (which originates through low-power WBTS-LD) to maintain full over-the-air coverage throughout the Boston market from the area's central television transmitter site in Needham (NBC's full-power lease with WMFP/Lawrence was effectively terminated on April 1 with the move of that station to a channel share with WWDP and a new city of license of Foxborough). WYCN-CD also moved from virtual channel 13 to channel 15 to avert any confusion with WGME/Portland, Maine, which has some signal coverage in the extreme northeastern portion of the Boston market.	
January 24	Ottumwa, Iowa/ Kirksville, Missouri	KYOU-TV	15.2	Grit	NBC	On January 8, 2018, American Spirit Media/Raycom Media announced that KYOU-TV (which Raycom operates under a shared services agreement with American Spirit) would affiliate its DT2 subchannel with NBC in late January to augment the existing primary Fox affiliation on the station's main channel. The subchannel networks Grit and Escape also moved down one subchannel (with Escape, originally planned to be removed, retained after viewer demand and a multiplexer upgrade - see above section). It would be a short-lived reprieve for Escape, as KYOU would take the CW affiliation for the subchannel on September 1. KYOU's addition of NBC programming results in the major four broadcast networks spread across the Ottumwa–Kirksville market's two full-power commercial television stations (Sinclair-owned KTVO operates as a primary feed ABC and subchannel-only CBS affiliate), and leaves Mankato, Presque Isle, Alpena, and Harrisonburg as the only remaining U.S. media markets without a local NBC affiliate.	
January 24	Ottumwa, Iowa/ Kirksville, Missouri	KYOU-TV	15.3	Escape	Grit		
February 12	Salem, Indiana (Louisville, Kentucky)	WBKI-TV (re-called from WMYO)	58.1	MyNetworkTV	The CW	Block Communications, which purchased the programming rights for the CW schedule carried by the former Campbellsville, Kentucky-licensed iteration of WBKI until that station's owners took it silent as a result of the spectrum auction on October 25 and placed it as a subchannel on the WMYO spectrum, decides to move the CW schedule from a subchannel which had issues being carried by DirecTV, Dish and AT&T U-verse, to the main channel of the WMYO spectrum, while also re-calling the station with the WBKI calls. WMYO's former main schedule with the declining MyNetworkTV programming service moves to the third subchannel, and in reverse loses DirecTV/Dish/U-verse carriage in order to assure full-market coverage for CW programming (the second subchannel is contractually obligated to Cozi TV). Block also ends use of the former channel 34 allocation associated with the defunct Campbellsville version of WBKI with the CW and Movies! subchannels.	
February 12	Salem, Indiana (Louisville, Kentucky)	WBKI-TV (re-called from WMYO)	58.3	The CW	MyNetworkTV		
March 1	Key West (Miami)	WGEN-TV	8.1	Transitional Spanish independent from Azteca América	Estrella TV	WGEN was purchased by Liberman Broadcasting on January 8, 2018, and the sale was completed on March 16, 2018, giving Estrella TV a full-power station of their own in a critical Spanish-language television market after years on low-power WVFW-LD, which was augmented with a subchannel lease on WSVN-DT2 that ended in July 2017 due to that station's affiliation with Light TV for full-market coverage. The deal also gives WGEN some stability after several years with the moribund MundoFox/MundoMax network, and a one-year affiliation with Azteca América.	
April 2	Lewiston, Maine (Portland)	WIPL (re-called from WPME)	35.1	MyNetworkTV	Ion Television	WPME was sold by Ironwood Communications to Ion Media Networks on December 4, 2017, with the sale closing on April 2, 2018. The sale returns Ion to the Portland market after their original sale of WMPX-TV to Corporate Media Consultants Group in December 2002, which then took the current calls WPFO and a Fox affiliation (that station was sold to Sinclair-related company Cunningham Broadcasting in a duopoly with CBS affiliate WGME-TV in 2013; the coincidentally-called WPXT never maintained any relationship with Ion Television or predecessor network Pax TV). WPME's MyNetworkTV affiliation thus moves to the third subchannel of former Ironwood sister station WPXT, with WPME taking the full six-network suite of Ion Television networks. A required call change as part of the deal (WPXT-DT3 will remain branded as "WPME") will see the channel 35 spectrum take the new WIPL calls, standing for "Ion in PortLand".	
April 2	Lewiston, Maine (Portland)	WPXT-DT3	51.3	Escape	MyNetworkTV		
July 2	Provo, Utah (Salt Lake City)	KBYU-TV	11.1	PBS	BYUtv (migrating from KBYU-DT2)	After 53 years as an affiliated public television station (first with NET, and then PBS), KBYU-TV switched to the national BYUtv network (which has aired free-to-air over its second subchannel in the market previously) on July 2, while parent owner Brigham Young University shuts down its Spanish language BYUtv International carried on cable and satellite in Latin American countries. The move leaves KUED-TV (as well as satellites KUES/Richfield and KUEW/St. George and related translators) as the exclusive PBS member station for the Salt Lake City market.	
July 16	Lorain, Ohio (Cleveland)	WUAB	43.1	MyNetworkTV (retained as secondary affiliation)	The CW (primary)	On July 11, Raycom Media and CBS Corporation announced that they had signed a long-term deal in which WUAB would affiliate with The CW, replacing WBNX (which had been affiliated with the network since The CW launched in September 2006) as its Cleveland affiliate, with only five days of advanced notice to the public. To accommodate the CW prime time lineup and other programming changes related to the switch, WUAB discontinued hour-long 7:00 a.m. and 9:00 p.m. newscasts produced by CBS-affiliated sister WOIO/Shaker Heights, and concurrently, expand its remaining WOIO-produced 10:00 p.m. newscast to a one-hour, seven-night-a-week broadcast (for which the program had originally ran priorto the September 2015 realignment of its evening news schedule). MyNetworkTV programming continued to air on its main channel each weeknight from 1:00 to 3:00 a.m. until January 25, 2019, when the affiliation was moved to the same time period on WOIO's MeTV subchannel. WBNX became an independent station, replacing CW weekday daytime and prime time shows with first-run and off-network syndicated programs already in its programming inventory, and syndicated E/I, drama and sports programs on Saturday mornings.	
July 16	Akron, Ohio (Cleveland)	WBNX-TV	55.1	The CW	Independent		
July 22	Montpelier/Burlington, Vermont/ Plattsburgh, New York	WNNE	31.1	NBC (as semi-satellite of WPTZ)	The CW	As a byproduct of WNNE's spectrum being integrated into Plattsburgh-licensed, NBC-affiliated sister WPTZ under a channel sharing agreement, on July 20, Hearst Television announced that WNNE – which had operated as a WPTZ semi-satellite since Heritage Media (which owned WPTZ from 1987 to 1997) acquired WNNE from the Taft Broadcasting Corporation in 1990 – would become a CW affiliate two days later on July 22, assuming the affiliation previously held by WPTZ-DT2, which was ceded to the WNNE signal under the CSA. Despite the conversion into a CW affiliate, WNNE will retain a separate facility in White River Junction, which serves as a news bureau for WPTZ. (For details on the CSA and resulting spectrum integration with WNNE, see WNNE's entry under the "Station spectrum transitions" section.)	
September 1	Danville/Roanoke/ Lynchburg, Virginia	WZBJ (re-called from WFFP-TV)	24.1	Cozi TV	MyNetworkTV	On August 13, Gray Television announced that it would purchase WFFP-TV and, on September 1, change the call letters to WZBJ. As part of the station's reformatting, WDBJ will begin producing an hour-long extension of WDBJ's morning newscast, Mornin', for, and will transfer the half-hour weeknight primetime newscast it has produced for its MyNetworkTV-affiliated DT2 subchannel (which moved to WLHG-CD in June 2018) since it launched in September 2006 to WZBJ. The move resulted from Gray's April 30 purchase of WLHG-CD from Liberty University for $50,000, which included an option to acquire and shared services agreement to manage WFFP-TV.	
September 1	Ottumwa, Iowa/ Kirksville, Missouri	KYOU-TV	15.4	Escape	The CW+	KYOU adds The CW Plus schedule as a replacement for Escape, replacing the Mediacom run cable-only "KWOT" and continuing a pattern throughout 2018, with the CW withdrawing its few remaining cable-only affiliates in smaller markets for over-the-air subchannels.	
October 1	Lincoln, Nebraska	KCWH-LD (re-called from K18CD-D)	18.1	NBC (as repeater of KSNB-TV/Superior)	The CW+ (DT1) on Television (DT2)	On October 1, Gray Television – owner of CBS affiliate KOLN and its Grand Island satellite KGIN – announced that KCWH-LD would begin serving as the Lincoln market's CW affiliate effective on that date. The station, which had previously operated as a translator of Superior-based NBC affiliate KSNB-TV, will be simulcast on subchannels of SonLife affiliate KNHL in Hastings (which will resume its prior NBC affiliation on its main channel upon consummation of Gray's purchase of that station from Legacy Broadcasting) and Fox affiliate KIIT-CD in North Platte. The move marks the first time that CW programming was available over-the-air in Lincoln since charter affiliate KCWL-TV converted into a Fox affiliate (as KFXL-TV) in 2009. (Prior to KCWH's sign-on, cable providers in the Lincoln market carried either Omaha affiliate KXVO or the national CW Plus feed as a default carrier of CW programming..) KCWH-LD also added Ion Television on its second digital subchannel, simulcasting KSNB-DT3 (which, along with KNOP-DT3 in North Platte, also began carrying Ion programming on that date).	

==== Subchannel affiliations ====
Date	Market	Station	Channel	Prior affiliation	New affiliation	Source
January 1	Lawton, Oklahoma (Wichita Falls, Texas)	KSWO-TV	7.3	This TV	MeTV	
January 1	Clermont/Orlando, Florida	WKCF	18.2	This TV	Justice Network	
January 1	Pittsburgh, Pennsylvania	WTAE-TV	4.2	This TV	Cozi TV	
January 1	Olean, New York	WVTT-CD	25.1	Youtoo America	This TV	
January 2	Milwaukee, Wisconsin	WVTV	18.2	getTV	MyNetworkTV (new channel number 24.1)	see WCGV-TV below
January 4	Weslaco/Brownsville/McAllen, Texas	KRGV-TV	5.2	This TV	Local English/Spanish independent	
January 29	Slidell/New Orleans, Louisiana	WUPL	54.2	Transitional SD simulcast of 54.1 (MyNetworkTV) from defunct MundoMax affiliation	Quest	
January 29	Tucson, Arizona	KMSB	11.2	Movies!	Quest	
January 30	Louisville, Kentucky	WHAS-TV	11.3	Local weather radar feed	Quest	
February 1	St. Louis, Missouri	KMOV	4.2	MeTV	Cozi TV	
February 24	Fond du Lac/Milwaukee, Wisconsin	WIWN	68.3	OnTV4U	Quest	
February 24	Fond du Lac/Milwaukee, Wisconsin	WMKE-CD	21.1	Rev'n	OnTV4U	
April 25	Fond du Lac/Milwaukee, Wisconsin	WIWN	68.4	LATV	getTV	
April 25	Fond du Lac/Milwaukee, Wisconsin	WIWN	68.7	Shop LC	LATV	
May 28	Houston, Texas	KPRC-TV	2.2	This TV	MeTV	
May 28	Houston, Texas	KUBE-TV	57.4	MeTV	Cozi TV	
September 1	Milwaukee, Wisconsin	WISN-TV	12.2	Movies!	Justice Network	
September 3	Atlanta, Georgia	WUPA	69.2	Decades	Start TV	
September 3	Baltimore, Maryland	WJZ-TV	13.2	Decades	Start TV	
September 3	Boston, Massachusetts	WBZ-TV	4.2	Decades	Start TV	
September 3	Chicago, Illinois	WBBM-TV	2.2	Decades	Start TV	
September 3	Dallas–Fort Worth	KTVT	11.2	Decades	Start TV	
September 3	Denver, Colorado	KCNC-TV	4.2	Decades	Start TV	
September 3	Detroit, Michigan	WWJ-TV	62.2	Decades	Start TV	
September 3	Los Angeles, California	KCBS-TV	2.2	Decades	Start TV	
September 3	Miami–Fort Lauderdale, Florida	WFOR-TV	4.2	Decades	Start TV	
September 3	Milwaukee, Wisconsin	WYTU-LD	63.2	This TV	Start TV	
September 3	Minneapolis–St. Paul, Minnesota; Walker–Bemidji, Minnesota	WCCO-TV; KCCW-TV	4.2; 12.2	Decades	Start TV	
September 3	New York City	WCBS-TV	2.2	Decades	Start TV	
September 3	Philadelphia, Pennsylvania	KYW-TV	3.2	Decades	Start TV	
September 3	Pittsburgh, Pennsylvania	KDKA-TV	2.2	Decades	Start TV	
September 3	Sacramento–Stockton–Modesto, California	KOVR	13.2	Decades	Start TV	
September 3	San Francisco–Oakland–San Jose, California	KPIX-TV	5.2	Decades	Start TV	
September 3	South Bend, Indiana	WCWW-LD	25.2	This TV	Start TV	
September 3	Tacoma, Washington (Seattle)	KSTW	11.2	Decades	Start TV	
September 3	Tampa–St. Petersburg, Florida	WTOG	44.2	Decades	Start TV	
September 3	Tuskegee, Alabama (Montgomery)	WBMM	22.2	Heartland	Start TV	
October 1	Detroit, Michigan	WUDL-LD7	19.7	Comet	CBN News Channel	
October 1	Indianapolis, Indiana	WSDI-LD4	30.4	AccuWeather	CBN News Channel	
October 1	Los Angeles, California	KHIZ-DT7	39.7	Altavision	CBN News Channel	
October 1	Macon, Georgia (Atlanta)	WUEO-LD5	49.5	Infomercials	CBN News Channel	
October 1	Memphis, Tennessee	KPMF-LD3	26.3	Comet	CBN News Channel	
October 1	Milwaukee, Wisconsin	WTSJ-LD5	38.5	AccuWeather	CBN News Channel	
October 1	Nashville, Tennessee	WKUW-LD6	40.6	QVC	CBN News Channel	
October 1	Oklahoma City, Oklahoma	KBZC-LD2	42.2	Light TV	CBN News Channel	
October 1	St. Louis, Missouri	KBGU-LD2	33.2	Shop LC	CBN News Channel	
October 1	Topeka, Kansas (Kansas City, Missouri)	KAJF-LD5	21.5	AccuWeather	CBN News Channel	
October 1	Wichita, Kansas	KFVT-LD3	34.3	GetTV	CBN News Channel	
October 22	Reno, Nevada	KRXI-TV	11.3	Grit	Antenna TV	
October 29	Portland, Maine	WMTW-DT2	8.2	Heroes & Icons	MeTV	
October 29	Portland, Maine	WPXT-DT2	51.2	MeTV	Heroes & Icons / MyNetworkTV	
November 12	Marquette, Michigan	WLUC-DT3	6.3	Grit	Start TV	
December 1	Anchorage, Alaska	KDMD-DT5	33.5	Movies!	Laff	

=== Station spectrum transitions ===
Formerstation	Channel sharingpartner/new station	Channel	Channel number retained(or new channel)	Affiliation	Market	Date	Notes	Ref.
WCGV-TV	WVTV			MyNetworkTV	Milwaukee, Wisconsin	January 8	WCGV-TV was sold in the 2017 spectrum auction for $84.3 million, with owner Sinclair Broadcast Group originally indicating that it would enter a channel sharing agreement with sister CW affiliate WVTV. However, with Sinclair's attempted acquisition of Tribune Media, which would include Milwaukee Fox affiliate WITI, Sinclair revealed in its FCC filing regarding the merger that it now intended to completely sign off WCGV-TV without any channel sharing agreement, allowing Sinclair to acquire WITI and retain WVTV. WCGV's program schedule, MyNetworkTV affiliation (and "My 24" branding) and subchannels were moved to the channel space of WVTV on January 8 (a week-long transition simulcast replaced GetTV over WVTV-DT2 on January 2), with its DT3 Grit affiliation moving to WTMJ-DT4. The license cancellation proved to be superfluous after Tribune decided to pull away from the Sinclair merger on August 9, 2018, as described above.	
WVCY-TV	WITI	30.#		Religious Independent	Milwaukee, Wisconsin	January 8	VCY America sold the religious station's spectrum in the auction for $76.3 million; WVCY has traditionally been run in a lean manner with only one standard-definition channel, thus it was able to enter a channel sharing agreement with Fox affiliate WITI. The station retains all existing cable and satellite carriage as part of the channel share.	
WMVT	WMVS	36.#		PBS	Milwaukee, Wisconsin	January 8	Milwaukee PBS relocated WMVT's programming and its subchannels to the VHF bandwidth of sister station WMVS at 9:00 a.m. that morning. At that time, both WMVS and WMVT re-mapped their channels on physical channel 8, with WMVT retaining its main signal on 36.1 in HD and a re-map among the two stations placing World on 36.2 and MPTV's weather service on 36.3 (the former traffic camera service on 36.6 was eventually merged into the weather feed). WMVS continues to map its main service on 10.1 in HD, with Create on 10.2 and PBS Kids remaining on 10.3.	
WMLW-TV	WBME-CD	49.#		Independent	Milwaukee, Wisconsin	January 8	Weigel Broadcasting-owned WMLW moved to WBME-CD's bandwidth at 5:00 a.m. that morning, reversing a channel swap done in August 2012 in order to allow WMLW to broadcast its main channel in high definition market-wide. WMLW and Bounce TV remained on their existing 49.1 and 49.2 positions. A simulcast of Telemundo affiliate WYTU-LD for the entire market that was formerly carried on WMLW-DT4 was moved to WDJT-TV's fourth subchannel, Decades relocated from WDJT-DT4 to WBME-CD2, and This TV was moved to WYTU-LD2 to finish out the final nine months of its carriage agreement. WBME-CD will continue to carry MeTV on both 41.1 and existing market-wide simulcast on WDJT-DT2.	
WUAB	WOIO	43.#		MyNetworkTV	Lorain/Cleveland, Ohio	January 8	Raycom Media sold the UHF channel 28 spectrum for WUAB for $32.3 million, and merged WUAB's main channel and Bounce TV subchannel onto the spectrum of sister CBS affiliation WOIO/Shaker Heights, while its Grit channel moved to WEWS-DT2 exclusively.	
WLVI	WHDH	56.#		The CW	Cambridge/Boston, Massachusetts	January 9	Sunbeam Television turned in the UHF channel 41 spectrum of WLVI to the FCC for a market high of $162.1 million; on January 9, WLVI's main channel and Buzzr subchannel were merged onto the channel space of WHDH, after a week-long transition where WHDH and WLVI broadcast similar channel maps to acclimate viewers and test the spectrum share.	
WPMT	WITF-TV	43.#		Fox	York/Harrisburg/ Lancaster/Lebanon, Pennsylvania	January 9	Tribune Broadcasting sold the UHF channel 47 digital spectrum of WPMT for $50.1 million. On January 9, WPMT merged its spectrum with Harrisburg PBS member station WITF, which resulted in portions of the Fox affiliate's signal contour being downgraded to rimshot or non-existent coverage in the southern portion of the market compared to the contour of its former transmitter location in Hellam Township. WPMT's Antenna TV subchannel was retained, though (despite Tribune being half-owner of the network) it dropped This TV to allow WITF to retain their PBS Kids subchannel. WITF netted $25 million from Tribune as part of the sharing agreement.	
WZDC-CD	WRC-TV	44.1		Telemundo	Washington, D.C.	March 7	ZGS Communications sold the spectrum of WZDC-CD in the spectrum incentive auction for $66.182 million. The group indicated in FCC filings that it will enter into a channel sharing agreement to continue the station's operations once the spectrum was relinquished. On September 6, 2017, NBCUniversal Owned Television Stations announced that it will launch a Telemundo owned-and-operated station that will operate over the digital signal of NBC O&O WRC-TV (channel 4) in December, per acquisition of the Spanish language network's affiliation agreement with ZGS; a Telemundo spokesperson stated that the sale of WZDC's spectrum "gave us the ability to take back the Telemundo affiliation for this market." On December 4, NBCUOTS purchased ZGS outright, effectively confirming that WZDC-CD will remain on the air, using WRC's bandwidth as a separately licensed station as a Telemundo O&O. On March 7, 2018, WZDC-CD took the new virtual channel 44 to reduce confusion with WDVM-TV/Hagerstown, Maryland.	
WIVB-TV	WNLO			CBS	Buffalo, New York	April 16	WIVB's spectrum was sold in the incentive auction in 2017, prior to Nexstar Media Group's acquisition of the license. It entered into a channel sharing agreement with WNLO, which has been co-owned with WIVB since 2000, and the two licenses will share WNLO's RF channel 32, giving the station a city-grade signal in Toronto at the cost of the loss of reception from the southern part of the market (WIVB formerly transmitted from Colden, while WNLO's transmitter is situated in Grand Island in Buffalo's non-Canadian northern reaches).	
WRNN-TV	WWOR-TV	48.#		Independent	Kingston, New York and the Hudson Valley (new COL New Rochelle)	May 1	WRNN-TV was sold in the broadcast spectrum auction for $212 million, in what was initially believed to be the highest payout for any station in the spectrum auction. The "Regional News Network" programming will continue through some other, unspecified method after the station goes off the air. On February 16, the station stated that it had entered into a channel sharing agreement with Fox Television Stations and their Secaucus, New Jersey-licensed MyNetworkTV flagship station, WWOR-TV (virtual channel 9/digital channel 25), with a change of city of license to New Rochelle.	
WNDY-TV	WISH-TV	23.#		MyNetworkTV	Marion/Indianapolis, Indiana	June 15	Nexstar Media Group sold the UHF channel 32 spectrum for WNDY-TV in 2017. It entered into a channel sharing agreement with WISH-TV, which has been co-owned with WNDY since 2005, and the two licenses will share WISH-TV's RF channel 9, giving the station a city-grade signal in Indianapolis at the cost of the loss of reception from the northern part of the market (WNDY formerly transmitted from Hamilton County, Indiana, while WISH-TV's transmitter is situated in the Augusta neighborhood of Indianapolis' northwest side).	
WNNE	WPTZ	31.#		NBC→The CW +	Burlington, Vermont/Plattsburgh, New York (new COL Montpelier)	July 22	WNNE was sold in the broadcast spectrum auction for just under $50.5 million. On November 20, 2017, Hearst Television indicated that it would enter WNNE into a post-auction channel sharing agreement with WPTZ, with which the former has been co-owned since 1990; WNNE's city of license would also be changed from Hartford, Vermont to the state capital of Montpelier. (The WPTZ signal does not sufficiently reach Hartford). The commencement of WNNE's channel-sharing operations with WPTZ – and relocation of transmitter facilities from Mt. Ascutney to WPTZ's facility atop Mt. Mansfield – on July 22, resulted in WNNE's signal being unavailable over-the-air in Vermont's Upper Valley region. (Viewers in that area can now only receive WNNE through cable or satellite, or attempt to receive WWLP/Springfield, Massachusetts) WPTZ's second 5.2 subchannel affiliated with The CW Plus then became associated with WNNE's virtual channel 31.1 instead.	

=== Station closures ===
Station	Channel	Affiliation	Market	Date	Notes	Source
WOTH-CD	20.#	Movies!	Cincinnati, Ohio	January 23	On April 4, 2017, Block Broadcasting announced that it had sold WOTH-CD's broadcast spectrum in the FCC spectrum auction for $13.266 million. After initially indicating that it would enter into a channel sharing agreement post-auction, Block announced in December of that year, that it would instead cease operating WOTH-CD on January 23, 2018. After WOTH shut down on that date, Movies! and Heroes & Icons were respectively moved to sister station WBQC-LD (retaining their former 20.1 and 20.4 channel placements originally mapped by WOTH), with Decades expected to follow suit in February. (Three other networks that were carried by WOTH at the time it ceased operations – Buzzr, Newsmax TV and The Action Channel – will not be transitioned to WBQC's signal, while the Home Shopping Network and Evine were already carried on WBQC subchannels.)	
WCMZ-TV	28.#	PBS	Flint/Tri-Cities, Michigan	April 23	Central Michigan University, owner of WCMU-TV and three satellite stations of the PBS member in the Northern Michigan region, announced it will sell WCMZ-TV's broadcast spectrum in the FCC spectrum auction for $14 million to reduce redundancy of PBS programming in the market, which is also served by Delta College-owned PBS member WDCQ.	
KNCT	46.#	PBS	Belton/Killeen/ Temple/Waco, Texas	August 31	On February 27, 2018, the Central Texas College Board of Trustees voted to shut down KNCT due to budgetary concerns relating to the spectrum repacking – as the board originally assumed the FCC would cover the $4.4 million in expenses for the move, only to discover it would only cover 60% of the cost (resulting in Central Texas College shouldering $1.76 million in transition costs – and replacement of the station's transmission tower (originally built in 1970). The shutdown of KNCT – which originally intended to move its digital assignment from UHF channel 46 to UHF channel 17 by March 13, 2020 – will leave KAMU-TV/College Station as the only PBS station serving Central Texas, though area cable systems have the option of replace KNCT with KERA-TV/Dallas or KLRU/Austin. While PBS programming will no longer be available over-the-air in the Waco–Temple–Killeen market, KNCT's operational cessation is expected to be temporary as a result of the Central Texas College Board of Trustees's grant to reassign the license to Gray Television (owner of CBS affiliate KWTX-TV).	

== See also ==
- 2018 in American television
- 2018 deaths in American television
