= CW 18 =

CW 18 may refer to the following television stations in the U.S. affiliated with The CW:

== Current ==
- KCWH-LD in Lincoln–Hastings–Kearney, Nebraska
- KTTU-TV in Tucson, Arizona
- WETM-DT2 in Elmira, New York
- WKCF in Clermont–Orlando–Daytona Beach, Florida
- WVTV in Milwaukee, Wisconsin

== Former ==
- WCCB in Charlotte, North Carolina (2013–2025)
