= KFOR =

KFOR may refer to:

- KFOR (AM), a radio station (1240 AM) licensed to Lincoln, Nebraska, United States,
- KFOR-TV, a television station (channel 4 analog/27 digital) licensed to Oklahoma City, Oklahoma, United States,
- KFOR-TV (Nebraska), a defunct television station in Lincoln, Nebraska, United States,
- Kosovo Force, a NATO-led international peacekeeping force in Kosovo
