= Local 4 =

Local 4 can refer to American labor unions and broadcast stations:

- "Local 4" refers to a Medway, Massachusetts-based trade union, designed as "IUOE Local 4" by the International Union of Operating Engineers
- The moniker Local 4 is used by the following stations that broadcast on channel 4:
  - KAMR-TV, an NBC affiliate in Amarillo, Texas
  - KSNB-TV, an NBC affiliate in Superior, Nebraska
  - WDIV-TV, an NBC affiliate in Detroit, Michigan
  - WHBF-TV, a CBS affiliate in Rock Island, Illinois
