= WOWT =

Television station in Omaha, Nebraska

- Omaha, Nebraska; Council Bluffs, Iowa; United States
- City: Omaha, Nebraska
- Channels: Digital: 22 (UHF); Virtual: 6
- Branding: First Alert 6

Programming
- Affiliations: 6.1: NBC; for others, see § Subchannels

Ownership
- Owner: Gray Media; (Gray Television Licensee, LLC)

History
- First air date: August 29, 1949
- Former call signs: WOW-TV (1949–1975); WOWT (1975―1983); WOWT-TV (1983–2012)
- Former channel numbers: Analog: 6 (VHF, 1949–2009)
- Former affiliations: NBC (1949–1956); DuMont (secondary, 1949–1952); ABC (secondary, 1949–1953 and 1954–1957); CBS (secondary 1955–1956, primary 1956–1986)
- Call sign meaning: Woodmen of the World (original owner of WOW radio) + Television

Technical information
- Licensing authority: FCC
- Facility ID: 65528
- ERP: 1,000 kW
- HAAT: 418 m (1,371 ft)
- Transmitter coordinates: 41°18′40″N 96°1′38″W

Links
- Public license information: Public file; LMS
- Website: www.wowt.com

WOWT (channel 6) is a television station in Omaha, Nebraska, United States, affiliated with NBC and owned by Gray Media. The station's studios are located at the Kiewit Plaza on Farnam Street near downtown Omaha, and its transmitter is located on a "tower farm" near North 72nd Street and Crown Point Avenue in north-central Omaha.

WOWT is Gray's only Nebraska station that is not part of its Nebraska News & Weather Network which includes sister stations KOLN/KGIN, KSNB-TV, and KNOP-TV.

== History ==
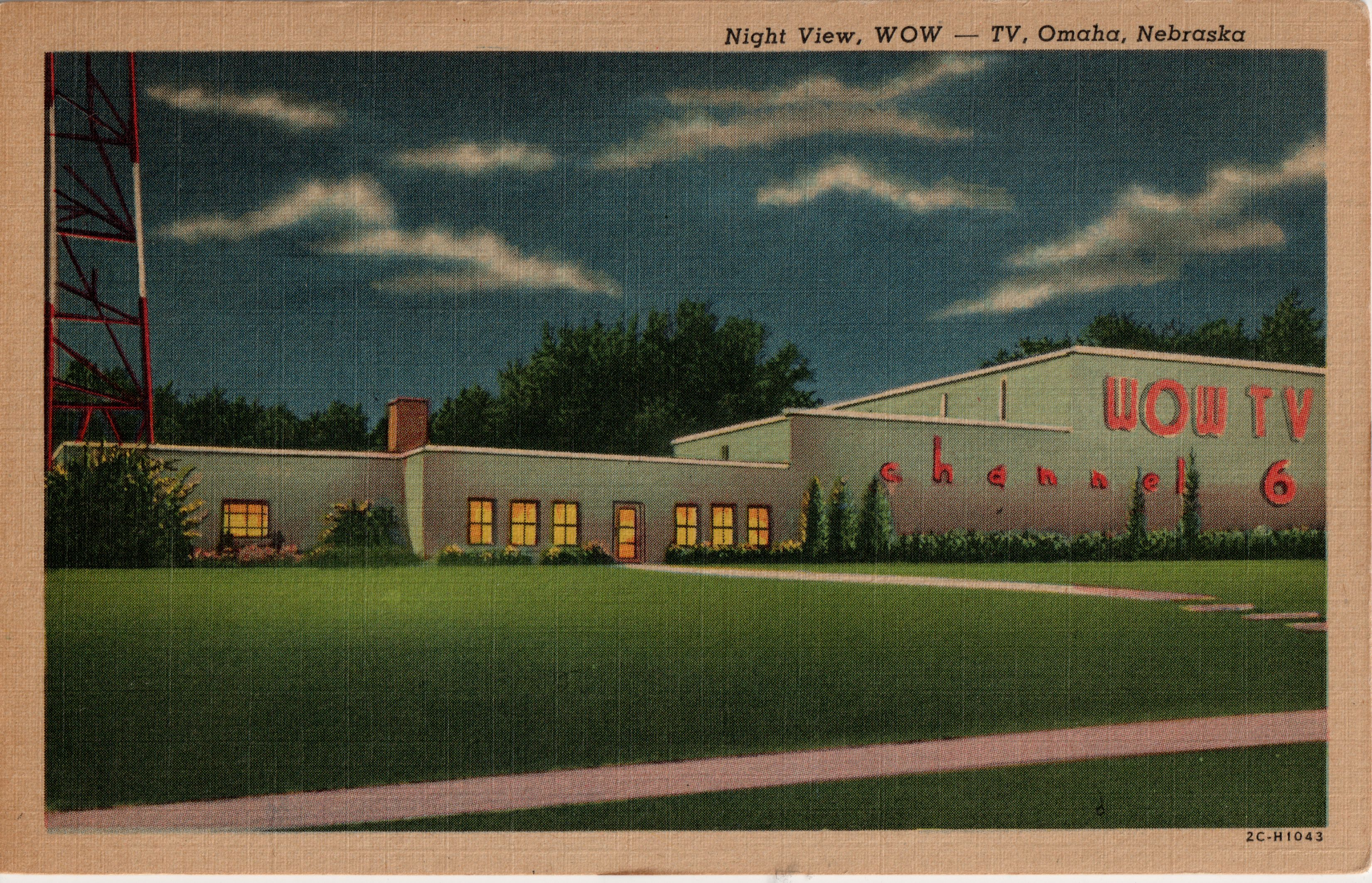
WOW, circa 1950s

The station signed on the air on August 29, 1949, at noon as WOW-TV; it was the first television station in Nebraska and is one of the oldest in the Upper Midwest. It also claims to have gone on the air earlier than any station in four other Midwestern states—Iowa, Kansas, North Dakota and South Dakota. The station was owned by Radio Station WOW, Inc., which also owned WOW radio in Omaha and KODY in North Platte. Meredith Corporation acquired the WOW stations in 1951.

WOW-TV was originally a primary NBC affiliate and secondary ABC affiliate; it lost ABC programming in 1953, when KFOR-TV signed on from Lincoln as an ABC affiliate. However, in 1954, Lincoln was separated from the Omaha market, and WOW-TV resumed sharing ABC programming with KMTV (channel 3) until 1957, when KETV signed on as an ABC affiliate. On January 24, 1955, after the radio stations dropped their longtime affiliation with the NBC Red Network in favor of the CBS Radio Network, WOW-TV became a secondary CBS television affiliate. This was part of CBS' multi-year, five-station affiliation deal with Meredith Corporation, as a compensation for Phoenix sister station KPHO's initial loss of the CBS affiliation to KOOL-TV before it reclaimed that affiliation in 1994 (KCMO-AM-FM-TV also switched to the network several months earlier). On January 1, 1956, WOW-TV officially became Omaha's CBS outlet, trading affiliations with KMTV.

WOWT's most famous former employee is former Tonight Show host Johnny Carson, who worked at WOW-TV in the early 1950s in his first television job as the host of a program called The Squirrel's Nest, where he told jokes. Another prominent former employee is former ABC Good Morning America reporter Steve Bell, who worked for Channel 6 during the early and mid-1960s. He was the only local reporter to go to Dallas in November 1963 to cover the aftermath of the John F. Kennedy assassination. Bell left channel 6 in 1967 to join ABC News, where he remained until 1986.

In 1974, Meredith tried to sell WOW-TV to Pulitzer Publishing Company for $8 million, but the deal collapsed and Pulitzer ended up buying KETV instead.

When Meredith sold channel 6 to the San Francisco-based Chronicle Publishing Company in 1975, it changed its call letters to WOWT on July 9, due to Federal Communications Commission (FCC) restrictions regarding the usage of the same call letters by different owners at the time. Normally, channel 6 would have had to adopt a callsign starting with "K" when it changed its call letters, since the WOW call letters had been assigned before the current K/W dividing line was moved to the Mississippi River. However, Chronicle wanted to continue trading on the WOW calls, and got a waiver from the FCC to retain a "W" in its calls. To this day, WOWT is one of the westernmost stations with a callsign starting with "W". After negotiations with the network, Channel 6 reversed the 1956 swap and rejoined NBC on June 29, 1986.

Not surprisingly, channel 6 owns a lot of firsts in the market. It was the first Omaha station to broadcast local programming in color, starting in the mid-1950s; it was the first station to provide live reports during its daily newscasts; it was the first of the three local stations to broadcast three live daily newscasts, at 5, 6, and 10 p.m.; and in 1993, WOWT was the first local television station to offer a website. During the analog era, WOWT-TV was relayed in Clarinda, Iowa, on a UHF repeater, K58AE, which has since been shut down and deleted from the FCC database.

In 1999, Chronicle sold its media holdings (including its newspapers and four television stations) to separate buyers; WOWT was sold to Benedek Broadcasting via LIN TV Corporation in a three-way deal for WWLP in Springfield, Massachusetts. Three years later, Benedek Broadcasting was acquired by Gray Television. In 2021, WOWT reunited with some former sister stations after being separated for 46 years when Gray Television acquired Meredith.

Until 2014, WOWT was considered the default NBC affiliate for Lincoln, the state capital, located 52 miles (84 km) from Omaha. Despite Lincoln being in a different market, most Lincoln-area cable systems carried WOWT, and channel 6's analog signal decently covered Lincoln. It even went as far as including Lincoln in its legal IDs. When direct broadcast satellite gained more penetration KHAS-TV (now KNHL) in Hastings, which had long served as the NBC affiliate for the western half of the Lincoln market, was offered as the local NBC affiliate. However, most Lincoln cable systems opted to continue carrying WOWT. With the acquisition of KSNB-TV in Superior by Gray, that station took over the primary local NBC affiliation for Lincoln, replacing WOWT on the local Time Warner Cable (now Charter Spectrum) system. Until 2016, WOWT was carried in standard definition on digital channel 83 in Lincoln and surrounding Spectrum systems. However, it is no longer available in the Lincoln area.

On January 7, 2015, Gray Television stations WOWT, WIBW (Topeka, Kansas), and KAKE (Wichita, Kansas; no longer owned by them) were dropped from Cox cable lineups as a retransmission deal expired. The previous agreement expired on December 31, but a one-week extension was agreed upon before the current blackout. After a dispute lasting several days, a new agreement was reached on January 11, 2015, and the three Gray Television stations returned to Cox cable lineups.

In May 2026, WOWT launched Golden Spike Sports and Entertainment Network on its sixth subchannel in partnership with the Omaha Storm Chasers of Minor League Baseball. The network airs all Storm Chaser home games.

=== 6_{2}O ===
In October 2005, WOWT launched a second digital subchannel as a UPN affiliate, branded as "UPN Omaha". The subchannel became an independent station branded as "6_{2}O", when The WB and UPN shut down in September 2006 (former WB affiliate KXVO (channel 15) now carries WB and UPN successor The CW, while Fox affiliate KPTM (channel 42) carries MyNetworkTV on its second digital subchannel).

After that, 6.2 became affiliated with Universal Sports. However, when Universal Sports transitioned exclusively to cable and satellite distribution, WOWT dropped the network on October 1, 2011, replacing it with a local weather service known as "The Weather Authority Channel", an affiliate of The Local AccuWeather Channel. KETV (channel 7) dropped The Local AccuWeather Channel in September 2011 to switch its second subchannel to MeTV.

== News operation ==
WOWT currently broadcasts 40 hours of locally produced newscasts each week (with seven hours each weekday and 2 1/2 hours on both Saturdays and Sundays); in regard to the number of hours devoted to news programming, it has the highest local newscast output of any broadcast television stations in the Omaha market.

In 1991, WOWT rebranded its newscasts from Action News 6 to Channel 6 News. In 1995, WOWT launched a cable news channel called "NEWS on ONE", which featured live simulcasts and taped rebroadcasts of the station's newscasts on Cox Communications channel 1. The channel was eventually rebranded as "News 4 You", concurrent with its move to Cox channel 4 in 2009. Also in 1995, WOWT's sports department launched a weekly half-hour sports news program titled Channel 6 Sunday Sports Extra, which aired after the station's 10 p.m. newscast on Sunday evening. It was the only program of its kind in Omaha, and was hosted from its inception by sports producer (now sports director) Ross Jernstrom. In 2006, WOWT lost its longtime spot in first place in most timeslots to KETV, who remains there as of 2020. In October 2013, the newscasts were rebranded WOWT 6 News. On July 16, 2018, WOWT re-added a 4 p.m. newscast on weekdays, competing with KMTV's newscast at that time slot. WOWT had been the first Omaha station to have a 4 p.m. newscast, launching it in 1994. Its current moniker is "First Alert 6".

== Technical information ==
=== Subchannels ===
The station's signal is multiplexed:

Subchannels of WOWT
Subchannel	Res.	Short name	Programming
6.1	1080i	WOWT	NBC
6.2	480i	COZI	Cozi TV
6.3	480i	HandI	Heroes & Icons
6.4	480i	ION TV	Ion
6.5	480i	StartTV	Start TV
6.6	480i	The 365	365BLK
6.7	480i	Outlaw	Outlaw

=== Analog-to-digital conversion ===
WOWT ended regular programming on its analog signal, over VHF channel 6, on February 17, 2009, as part of the federally mandated transition from analog to digital television (which Congress had moved the previous month to June 12). The station's digital signal remained on its pre-transition UHF channel 22, using virtual channel 6. WOWT and PBS member station KYNE (part of the Nebraska Public Media TV network) were the only two stations in the Omaha market to end analog broadcasts on the original deadline.

Upon the switch to digital, WOWT aired a 60-second farewell video bookending the analog era from beginning to end. It began with the words "Welcome to the Future", followed with archived film footage of WOW-TV's transmitter being turned on 1949 as it was covered by then-sister station WOW radio (now KXSP), outdoor scenes set to the song "America the Beautiful", and concluded with the station logo and digital call sign "WOWT-DT Omaha" set to the NBC chimes. Voiceover artist Charlie Van Dyke provided narration: "Sixty years ago, WOWT turned on its analog signal to be the first television station in Omaha. Now, join us for the digital age as we shut off our analog signal and transition to digital television. We look forward to the new journey ahead. This is WOWT, Channel 6."

As part of the SAFER Act, WOWT kept its analog signal on the air temporarily to inform viewers of the digital television transition through a scrolling message.
