= Leta Powell Drake =

American broadcaster (1938–2021)

- Born: Leta Powell; March 10, 1938; Duluth, Minnesota, U.S.
- Died: September 15, 2021 (aged 83); Lincoln, Nebraska, U.S.
- Occupations: broadcaster, television producer, screenwriter and television personality
- Years active: 1955–2021

Leta Powell Drake (March 10, 1938 – September 15, 2021) was an American broadcaster, television producer, screenwriter and television personality on local stations in Nebraska. Drake hosted Live & Learn, a program for seniors on 5 City TV in Lincoln, Nebraska, and has been inducted into the Nebraska Broadcasters Hall of Fame and the Nebraska Press Women's Hall of Fame.

Drake acted in more than 100 plays and two movies. She was a member of the National Association of Television Program Executives (NATPE). She was also one of the creators of the Star City Holiday Parade.

A member of the Screen Actors Guild, Drake served on the boards of the University of Nebraska College of Fine and Performing Arts; UNL Alumni Association; Osher Life Long Learning Institute at UNL; Lincoln General Hospital Auxiliary; Mayor's Film Commission; Muscular Dystrophy Association; Lincoln Advertising Federation; Lincoln Community Playhouse; Theatre Arts for Youth; YMCA; The Salvation Army; 99's (Women pilots); Nebraskans for Public Television; and Nebraska Public Radio.

== Career ==
Born in Duluth, Minnesota, Drake began her broadcasting career at KDAL-TV (now KDLH-TV) there. In 1956, the VFW sponsored the "Voice of Democracy" essay contest for high school students. Drake's voice was recorded for the first time, and she won the city championship. The TV station offered her a part-time job. She began as talent on commercials and was on a live Bingo program.

=== KOLN-TV ===
Drake served as program director at Lincoln, Nebraska's KOLN-TV for 28 years, where she purchased and scheduled programs, and she served as a writer, program producer, and on-air host as well as the public affairs director, and director of children's programming, talent development and sales. She hosted and produced the 10/11 Morning Show for 25 years. She interviewed more than 1,000 movie and TV celebrities, humanitarians and two presidents.

In 1967, Drake created the character of Kalamity Kate on Cartoon Corral.

=== Nebraska Public Television (NPT) ===
Drake served as the assistant network program manager for Nebraska Public Television for 13 years. She also programmed the nine station state network and cable system there, as well.

Drake became the spokesperson for Nebraska Public Media through their fund drives and auctions.

== Contemporary accolades ==
In 2020, some of Drake's interviews of older celebrities started to go viral. A twitter user named John Frankensteiner posted a compilation clip with the description reading "Currently obsessed with Leta Powell Drake, the greatest interviewer of all time." Many have noted that Drake's style of interviewing tended to be very matter-of-fact and blunt. Examples were telling Tim Curry that he "looks evil in many ways", prefacing Lee Remick with "You got to work with Richard Burton in The Tempest, and now he's dead" and telling Gene Hackman, "You've done some brilliant pictures, you've done some stinkers" with a bemused Hackman responding "Really?" Drake believed that the reason her interviews were popular was because she interviewed older celebrities. When she realized that it was because of her approach to interviewing, she stated "I'm not matter-of-fact; I do my homework... If I'm going to do an interview, I come in and look like I know what I'm talking about... And maybe that was it. Confidence will take you a long way, you know, it really will."

== Death ==
She died on September 15, 2021.

== Awards and recognitions ==
- Friend of Nebraska Award, Seward Chamber of Commerce: grand marshal in Fourth of July parade, 1978
- Admiral in the Great Navy of the State of Nebraska
- Golden Grid Award from Trac Media for largest increase in ratings of any PBS station in country over a three-year period, 1997
- PBS Development Award First Place for raising the greatest dollar percentage increase during year long pledge drives than any PBS station in the system, 1997
- Mayor's Arts Award Sam Davidson Award in Theatre, May, 2001
- Lady Vestey Gracious Lady Award, Superior, Nebraska, May 2001
- Abe Lincoln Award Southern Baptist Radio and Television Commission for Service to the Community, presented by Bob Hope
- Who's Who in American Women
- Salvation Army's Bonnet Award of distinction for service to others
- Television Bureau of Advertising: First Place Award for best locally produced TV commercial in the US
- Lincoln Advertising Federation: First Place Award for best locally produced TV commercial
- Best Actress award five times at University of Nebraska Theatre
- Elsie Award, Outstanding Performance Award six times at the Lincoln Community Playhouse
- Aldo Award Men's Fashion Association of America: First place seven times for the best local television coverage of men's fashions in the country
- All Women's Transcontinental Air Race Powder Puff Derby: Placed twice in the top ten and piloted a single engine aircraft across the US four times
- Life Membership Award Lincoln General Hospital Auxiliary, October, 2002
- Nebraska Broadcasters Association Hall of Fame, August 2010
- She was inducted into the NPW Marian Andersen Women Journalists Hall of Fame in 2014.
- Drake was presented with an honorary Doctor of Humane Letters during the undergraduate ceremony at Pinnacle Bank Arena on August 14, 2021. Lincoln Journal Star
