= KNHL =

Television station in Hastings, Nebraska

- Hastings–Kearney–Grand Island, Nebraska; United States
- City: Hastings, Nebraska
- Channels: Digital: 5 (VHF); Virtual: 5
- Branding: MeTV Nebraska

Programming
- Affiliations: 5.1: MeTV; 18.1: CW+; for others, see § Subchannels

Ownership
- Owner: Gray Media; (Gray Television Licensee, LLC)
- Sister stations: KCWH-LD, KNPL-LD, KOLN–KGIN, KSNB-TV

History
- First air date: January 1, 1956
- Former call signs: KHAS-TV (1956–2014)
- Former channel numbers: Analog: 5 (VHF, 1956–2009); Digital: 21 (UHF, 2005–2008)
- Former affiliations: NBC (1956–2014); Dark (2014–2015); SonLife (2015–2019); MyNetworkTV/MeTV (2019–2022)
- Call sign meaning: "Nebraska, Hastings, Lincoln"

Technical information
- Licensing authority: FCC
- Facility ID: 48003
- ERP: 45 kW
- HAAT: 217 m (712 ft)
- Transmitter coordinates: 40°38′56″N 98°23′2″W

Links
- Public license information: Public file; LMS

KNHL (channel 5) is a television station licensed to Hastings, Nebraska, United States, affiliated with MeTV and owned by Gray Media. As KHAS-TV, it formerly served as the NBC affiliate for the western side of the Lincoln–Hastings–Kearney market. KNHL is a sister station to NBC affiliate KSNB-TV (channel 4) in York, CBS affiliates KOLN/KGIN (channels 10 and 11) in Lincoln and Grand Island, and low-power CW+ affiliate KCWH-LD (channel 18) in Lincoln. KNHL's transmitter is located on US 281 north of Hastings.

In 2014, Gray acquired Hoak Media; as it already owned the three aforementioned stations (KOLN/KGIN and KSNB) in the same market, it planned to sell KHAS to the shell company Excalibur Broadcasting and operate KHAS under a shared services agreement (SSA). As a result of growing FCC scrutiny towards "virtual duopolies", Gray instead let KHAS fall silent on June 13, 2014, and its programming and news operation were relocated to KSNB-TV, pending a sale of KHAS-TV to a minority owned broadcaster, Legacy Broadcasting. In September 2018, Gray agreed to purchase KNHL.

== History ==
KNHL was founded in 1956 as KHAS-TV by a group of local investors headed by Fred A. Seaton, publisher of the Hastings Tribune newspaper and Secretary of the Interior during the Eisenhower Administration. It took its calls from KHAS radio, which Seaton had founded in 1940. In 1967, it was one of the first stations in the area to acquire color broadcasting equipment.

Seaton died in 1974. His family held on to channel 5 until 1997, when it was sold to Dick Shively and Ulysses Carlini Sr., owners of North Platte TV stations KNOP-TV and K11TW, operating the three stations under the name Greater Nebraska Television. In 2005, Greater Nebraska Television sold the stations to Hoak Media.

Former logo as KHAS-TV in 2013-2014, KSNB briefly used this logo in 2014 after KHAS-TV went silent

The station's studio was located north of Hastings on US 281. The transmitter tower was located next to the studio. KHAS-TV was formerly rebroadcast on translator station K14IY in Holdrege; this translator went dark in 2009. KHAS-TV was later also carried on K02HJ in Ord and K35AL analog channel 35 in Lexington, Nebraska. All three translators broadcast an analog signal. K35AL formerly carried programming from sister station KNOP-TV but Lexington is in the Lincoln–Hastings–Kearney market while North Platte is a separate market. Both local and national programming on KHAS was carried in high definition.

Starting around 2004, KHAS began branding itself as a full-market NBC station. Previously, Omaha's WOWT-TV had claimed the capital as part of its primary coverage area, inheriting that status when it regained the NBC affiliation from KMTV-TV in 1985. For the next two decades, KHAS-TV identified as "Hastings/Kearney/Grand Island/Lincoln" on-air and on its Website. While WOWT was still carried on Lincoln cable systems, KHAS-TV was picked up on the Lincoln DirecTV and Dish Network feeds as the local NBC station, boosting its potential audience to over 700,000 people across Nebraska and Kansas.

In June 2012, KHAS and other Hoak-owned stations were pulled from Dish Network after they failed to renew a carriage agreement. The refusal to renew reportedly surrounds Dish Network's "Hopper" digital video recorder and its controversial commercial-skipping feature AutoHop—which has also led to complaints from the major U.S. television networks.

=== Shutdown and sale ===
On November 20, 2013, Gray Television announced it would purchase Hoak Media in a $335 million deal. As Gray already owned KOLN/KGIN, KHAS was to be sold to Excalibur Broadcasting and operated by Gray under a local marketing agreement. However, in the wake of heightened FCC scrutiny of local marketing agreements, on June 11, 2014, KHAS-TV announced it would leave the air at midnight on June 13. Its NBC affiliation, along with its news department and syndicated programming, would be moved to KSNB-TV and the digital subcarriers of KOLN and KGIN. KHAS would then be sold off to minority interests, which under this arrangement would allow the station to return to the air on the conditions that the new owner operate the station independently (under minority, female and/or non-profit ownership) and not make any partnerships or sharing arrangements with other broadcasters. KSNB-TV still operates from KHAS-TV's former studio.

On August 27, 2014, Gray announced that it would sell KHAS-TV along with KAQY, KNDX, and KXND to Legacy Broadcasting, a new broadcasting company controlled by Sherry Nelson and daughter Sara Jane Ingram. On December 1, 2014, the call letters became KNHL. The sale was completed on December 15. Legacy returned KNHL to the air June 6, 2015 as an affiliate of the SonLife Broadcasting Network.

On May 21, 2018, Gray agreed to acquire KNHL from Legacy Broadcasting for $475,000; in filing for FCC approval of the purchase in September 2018, Gray proposed to operate the station as a satellite of KSNB-TV. In connection with the sale, Gray began leasing KNHL's third digital subchannel on September 1, 2018, to simulcast KCWH-LD, Gray's Lincoln-based CW affiliate (through The CW Plus); the affiliation formally launched on October 1. The sale of the station was approved on February 12, 2019. The sale was completed on March 1, reuniting KNHL with many of its former Hoak Media sisters. Upon completion of the sale, KNHL was converted into a satellite station of KSNB-DT1, KSNB-DT2, and KSNB-DT3 (on 5.2, 5.1, and 5.4, respectively) and KCWH-LD1 (on 5.3). Through the utilization of updated multiplexer equipment, NBC and CW+ programming was aired in high definition on 5.2 and 5.3, respectively (although in 720p for both HD feeds; the KSNB-DT1 simulcast is downconverted from the native 1080i resolution of the NBC network), with MyNetworkTV and MeTV programming on 5.1 and Ion Television programming on 5.4 airing in 16:9 standard definition.

== News operation ==
KHAS-TV produced 16 hours of local news per week, with 3 hours each weekday and 30 minutes on Saturday and Sunday. Newscasts aired weekdays at 6 and 11:30 a.m., weeknights at 5 and 6 p.m., and seven nights a week at 10 p.m.

Upon the station going dark on June 13, 2014, the entire news operation moved to KSNB-TV.

== Technical information ==
=== Subchannels ===
The station's signal is multiplexed:

Subchannels of KNHL
Channel	Res.	Short name	Programming
5.1	480i	MeMyTV	MeTV
5.2	480i	START	Start TV
5.3	480i	CourtTV	Court TV
5.4	480i	ION TV	Ion (KSNB-TV)
5.5	480i	Oxygen	Oxygen
5.6	480i	OUT	Outlaw
18.1	720p	CW HD	The CW Nebraska (KCWH-LD)

Simulcast of subchannels of another station

In September 2005, KHAS-TV began operating NBC Weather Plus (known as "News 5 Weather Plus") on digital subchannel 5.2 and until 2008, it was the only Hoak Media-owned NBC affiliate to carry the network when it was dropped due to NBCUniversal's purchase of The Weather Channel. In September 2010, KHAS-TV digital subchannel 5.2 switched from a standard-definition simulcast to This TV. It identified locally as "This Nebraska". On November 1, 2013, KHAS replaced This TV with Cozi TV.

=== Analog-to-digital conversion ===
KNHL (as KHAS-TV) shut down its analog signal, over VHF channel 5, on December 1, 2008. The station's digital signal relocated from its pre-transition UHF channel 21 to VHF channel 5. Due to Nebraska's cold winter weather, the station elected to make the transition early rather than on the national February 17, 2009, analog shutoff date. The digital signal on channel 5 is one of only 48 full-power stations in the United States to broadcast digitally using a low-VHF/Band I channel.
