= KIIT-CD =

Television station in North Platte, Nebraska

- North Platte, Nebraska; United States
- Channels: Digital: 11 (VHF); Virtual: 11
- Branding: Fox 11

Programming
- Affiliations: 11.1: Fox; 11.2: CW+

Ownership
- Owner: Gray Media; (Gray Television Licensee, LLC)
- Sister stations: KNOP-TV, KNPL-LD

History
- Founded: December 12, 1994
- First air date: August 28, 1995
- Former call signs: K11TW (1994–2014); KIIT-CA (2014–2015)
- Former affiliations: UPN (1995–2001)
- Call sign meaning: derived from former K11TW call sign

Technical information
- Licensing authority: FCC
- Facility ID: 49285
- Class: CD
- ERP: 0.22 kW
- HAAT: 147.9 m (485 ft)
- Transmitter coordinates: 41°12′13″N 100°44′0″W
- Translator(s): KNOP-TV 2.2 North Platte

Links
- Public license information: Public file; LMS
- Website: KNOP-TV 2 Online

KIIT-CD (channel 11) is a low-power, Class A television station in North Platte, Nebraska, United States, affiliated with the Fox network. It is owned by Gray Media alongside NBC affiliate KNOP-TV (channel 2) and low-power CBS affiliate KNPL-LD (channel 10). The three stations share studios on South Dewey Street in downtown North Platte; KIIT-CD's transmitter is located on US 83 in the northern part of the city. Master control and some internal operations are based at the studios of sister station KOLN in Lincoln.

Although KIIT broadcasts a signal of its own, it is limited to the immediate North Platte area. It is therefore simulcast in high definition on KNOP's second digital subchannel in order to reach the entire market. Fox programming also airs in the area on Lincoln's KFXL-TV, which is carried on KWNB's subchannel.

== History ==
From the grant of its original construction permit on December 12, 1994, through June 26, 2014, the station was assigned the translator-style call sign of K11TW, and retained it even after obtaining Class A status in 2001. However, outside of Federal Communications Commission (FCC)-required station identification, the station has always called itself "KIIT" on the air. It signed on the air on August 28, 1995, as a UPN affiliate; it switched to Fox on January 22, 2001. Prior to K11TW's switch to Fox, KHGI-TV served as a secondary affiliate of the network for the purposes of carrying its sports programming.

K11TW was originally owned by North Platte Television, longtime owner of KNOP-TV; the company was reorganized as Greater Nebraska Television after the 1997 purchase of KHAS-TV in Hastings. Greater Nebraska Television sold its stations, including K11TW and KNOP, to Hoak Media in December 2005; the sale followed the death of majority shareholder Richard Shively. On November 20, 2013, Hoak Media announced the sale of most of its stations, including K11TW and KNOP-TV, to Gray Television, making them sister stations to KNPL; the sale was completed on June 13, 2014.

== Subchannels ==
The station's signal is multiplexed:

Subchannels of KIIT-CD
Channel	Res.	Short name	Programming
11.1	720p	KIIT HD	Fox
11.2	720p	CW NP	The CW Plus (KCWH-LD)
11.3	480i	365	365BLK
