= KFOR-TV (Nebraska) =

Television station in Lincoln, Nebraska (1953–1954)

- Lincoln, Nebraska; United States
- Channels: Analog: 10 (VHF)

Programming
- Affiliations: ABC

Ownership
- Owner: Cornbelt Broadcasting Co.

History
- Founded: October 1952
- First air date: May 31, 1953
- Last air date: March 13, 1954
- Call sign meaning: KFOR

KFOR-TV (channel 10) was a television station in Lincoln, Nebraska, United States, which operated from May 1953 to March 1954.

== History ==
KFOR-TV signed on May 31, 1953, three months after the launch of the first television station in Lincoln, Nebraska, KOLN. It was founded by Lincoln-based Cornbelt Broadcasting, which also operated KFOR radio. New studios were built for the station at 48th and Vine streets. The station's transmitter was located on the KFOR radio tower a few blocks away from the studio. It was the ABC affiliate for both Omaha and Lincoln. However, according to longtime KOLN personality Leta Powell Drake, Omaha stations KMTV and WOW-TV, both of which had a secondary ABC affiliation, had first choice on ABC programming and blocked KFOR from airing ABC's most popular shows during prime time.

In February 1954, broadcasting pioneer John Fetzer — who had purchased KOLN in August 1953 — purchased KFOR-TV for $300,000. The purchase included the station license and equipment but not the studio building or KFOR radio. To avoid running afoul of Federal Communications Commission (FCC) ownership regulations (and to create a commercial broadcast monopoly for himself in the Lincoln market), Fetzer moved KOLN from its sign-on channel 12 to KFOR's channel 10 and donated the channel 12 facilities and the KFOR license to the University of Nebraska for its educational station, KUON-TV. KFOR-TV was shut down on March 13, 1954; KOLN picked up KFOR's ABC affiliation until Fetzer successfully persuaded the FCC to split Lincoln from the Omaha market, after which time it switched its primary affiliation to CBS.

Backyard Farmer originated on KFOR-TV in 1953; it moved to KUON in 1955 and continues to air on what is now known as Nebraska Public Media.

The former KFOR-TV studio became a funeral home, then was later converted to office space that was known for a time as the Egan Building.

The KFOR-TV call sign was adopted by the former WKY-TV/KTVY-TV in Oklahoma City, Oklahoma, in 1990.
