= KNOP-TV =

Television station in North Platte, Nebraska

- North Platte, Nebraska; United States
- Channels: Digital: 2 (VHF); Virtual: 2
- Branding: KNOP 2; KNOP News 2; Fox 11 (2.2)

Programming
- Affiliations: 2.1: NBC; 2.2: Fox; for others, see § Subchannels

Ownership
- Owner: Gray Media; (Gray Television Licensee, LLC)
- Sister stations: KIIT-CD, KNPL-LD

History
- First air date: December 15, 1958
- Former channel numbers: Analog: 2 (VHF, 1958–2009); Digital: 22 (UHF, until 2009)
- Call sign meaning: North Platte

Technical information
- Licensing authority: FCC
- Facility ID: 49273
- ERP: 16 kW
- HAAT: 196 m (643 ft)
- Transmitter coordinates: 41°12′13″N 100°44′0″W

Links
- Public license information: Public file; LMS
- Website: www.knopnews2.com

KNOP-TV (channel 2) is a television station in North Platte, Nebraska, United States, affiliated with NBC. It is owned by Gray Media alongside two low-power stations: CBS affiliate KNPL-LD (channel 10) and Class A Fox affiliate KIIT-CD (channel 11). The three stations share studios on South Dewey Street in downtown North Platte; master control and some internal operations are based at the facilities of sister station KOLN on North 40th Street in Lincoln. KNOP-TV's transmitter is located at the site of its former studio on US Route 83 north of North Platte.

== History ==
KNOP-TV was founded by local investors headed by attorney Rush Clarke and went on-air December 15, 1958.

In 1968, it was purchased by Richard F. Shively, Harold O. Shively and Ulysses Carlini Sr. Richard died on December 4, 2003. In 1997, Shively and Carlini bought KHAS-TV in Hastings, and formed Greater Nebraska Television as a holding company for their television interests.

In 2005, Greater Nebraska Television sold its stations (including KNOP-TV) to Hoak Media.

KNOP started rebroadcasting NBC programming in high definition, and carrying K11TW's Fox programming on its second digital subchannel, in March 2011.

KNOP gained national attention in February 2012 for being the only station in the country to air a Will Ferrell-produced Super Bowl commercial for Old Milwaukee beer.

On November 20, 2013, Hoak announced the sale of most of its stations, including KNOP-TV and K11TW, to Gray Television. The sale made them sister stations to North Platte CBS affiliate KNPL-LD, a semi-satellite of Gray's KOLN/KGIN; it would have also partially separated KNOP from KHAS-TV, which was planned to be sold to Excalibur Broadcasting but be operated by Gray's KOLN/KGIN and KSNB-TV through a shared services agreement. However, in the wake of heightened FCC scrutiny about local marketing agreements, on June 11, 2014, KHAS-TV announced it would leave the air at midnight on June 13 and NBC programming would be moved to KSNB-TV and the digital subcarrier of KOLN/KGIN. The whole sale was completed on June 13. (KHAS was ultimately sold to Legacy Broadcasting, the call letters were changed to KNHL, and it returned to the air in June 2015 as a SonLife Broadcasting Network affiliate.

On September 14, 2015, Gray announced that it would purchase the television and radio stations owned by Schurz Communications, including Scottsbluff, Nebraska based KDUH-TV (a satellite of Rapid City's ABC-affiliated KOTA-TV) for $442.5 million. Gray planned to convert KDUH into a semi-satellite of KNOP-TV, change the station's call letters to KNEP, and also change KDUH/KNEP's city of license to Sidney, Nebraska (which will move it from the Cheyenne–Scottsbluff market to the Denver market, eliminating an ownership conflict with KSTF, a Gray-owned, Scottsbluff-based semi-satellite of Cheyenne, Wyoming-based CBS affiliate KGWN-TV). The sale approved by the FCC on February 12, 2016, and was completed on February 16. The FCC approved the change of station's city of license on May 16. KNEP's NBC feed for the Nebraska Panhandle (which is branded as "NBC Nebraska Scottsbluff" and produces its own newscasts) signed on May 5, 2016. The station formerly aired KOTA-TV programming on its DT1 channel until 2020. The station was traded, along with KGWN-TV and KCWY-DT to Marquee Broadcasting in 2024 in exchange for the construction permit of KCBU in Salt Lake City.

== Newscasts ==
KNOP-TV presently broadcasts 20 hours of locally produced newscasts each week (with 3 hours, 35 minutes each weekday; one hour on Saturdays; and 1 hour, 5 minutes on Sundays). The station previously produced 2 1/2 hours of weekly news programming each for CBS and Fox affiliated sister stations KIIT-CD and KNPL-LD. KNOP-TV is the only television station in the North Platte market that offers local news.

== Technical information ==
=== Subchannels ===
The station's signal is multiplexed:

Subchannels of KNOP-TV
Channel	Res.	Short name	Programming
2.1	1080i	KNOP	NBC
2.2	720p	KIIT	Fox (KIIT-CD)
2.3	480i	ION TV	Ion
2.4	480i	OUT	Outlaw
10.1	1080i	KNPL	CBS (KNPL-LD)
10.2	480i	MeTV	MeTV (KSNB-TV)

Simulcast of subchannels of another station

=== Analog-to-digital conversion ===
KNOP-TV shut down its analog signal, over VHF channel 2, on February 10, 2009. The station's digital signal relocated from its pre-transition UHF channel 22 to VHF channel 2 for post-transition operations.
