= KNPL-LD =

Television station in North Platte, Nebraska

Semi-satellite of KOLN–KGIN, Lincoln–Grand Island, Nebraska
- North Platte, Nebraska; United States
- Channels: Digital: 25 (UHF); Virtual: 10
- Branding: 10/11 North Platte

Programming
- Affiliations: 10.1: CBS; for others, see § Subchannels

Ownership
- Owner: Gray Media; (Gray Television Licensee, LLC)
- Sister stations: KNOP-TV, KIIT-CD

History
- Founded: December 17, 1982 (as translator)
- First air date: September 3, 2013
- Former call signs: K57CZ (1982–2009); K25KA-D (2009–2013)
- Former channel numbers: Analog: 57 (UHF, 1983–2009)
- Call sign meaning: North Platte

Technical information
- Licensing authority: FCC
- Facility ID: 7891
- Class: LD
- ERP: 9.5 kW
- HAAT: 97.1 m (319 ft)
- Transmitter coordinates: 41°12′13″N 100°44′0″W
- Translator(s): K33FF-D Wallace

Links
- Public license information: LMS
- Website: www.1011now.com

KNPL-LD (channel 10) is a low-power television station in North Platte, Nebraska, United States, affiliated with CBS. It is owned by Gray Media alongside NBC affiliate KNOP-TV (channel 2) and Class A Fox affiliate KIIT-CD (channel 11). The three stations share studios on South Dewey Street in downtown North Platte; KNPL-LD's transmitter is located on US 83 in the northern part of the city.

Originally a translator of KOLN/KGIN in Lincoln/Grand Island, the station was relaunched on September 3, 2013, as a semi-satellite featuring local news programming specific to the North Platte market. Master control and some internal operations of KNPL-LD are based at KOLN's facilities on North 40th Street in Lincoln.

== History ==
In March 2013, Gray Television announced that it would launch a dedicated CBS station for the North Platte market, KNPL-LD. It would replace two low-powered KOLN translators that had been in operation since the early 1980s. KNPL operates under the license of one of those translators, K25KA-D (formerly K57CZ), which directly repeated KOLN and was owned by Gray Television. The other translator, K04ED, was owned by the city of North Platte and directly repeated KGIN. News director Stephanie Hedrick explained that the launch of KNPL, along with KSNB-TV, were a part of Gray's aim to build a statewide chain of news stations, and "provide viewers in North Platte with local news and instant access to other news that matters to North Platte".

KNPL-LD signed on under the branding "10/11 North Platte" on September 3, 2013.

== News operation and programming ==
At launch, KNPL broadcast two North Platte-specific newscasts at 6:30 and 10 p.m., branded as 10/11 North Platte News. Those newscasts launched in high definition, making them the first local newscasts in the market to be broadcast in HD. KNPL also simulcasts programming from KOLN/KGIN, including Pure Nebraska and 10/11 PrepZone. After merging studios with KNOP/KIIT in 2015, the 6:30 and 10 p.m. newscasts were dropped. Sometime in the second half of 2016, it returned to producing its own newscasts at 5 p.m. on the same set as KNOP/KNEP titled 10/11 North Platte Today At 5. It simulcasts all of KOLN/KGIN's other newscasts, as well as all network and syndicated programming.

== Subchannels ==
The station's signal is multiplexed:

Subchannels of KNPL-LD
Channel	Res.	Short name	Programming
10.1	1080i	KNPL-DT	CBS
10.2	480i	MeMy SD	MyNetworkTV & MeTV
10.3	720p	CW NP	The CW Plus
