= KCWH-LD =

Television station in Lincoln, Nebraska

- Lincoln, Nebraska; United States
- Channels: Digital: 18 (UHF); Virtual: 18
- Branding: The CW Nebraska

Programming
- Affiliations: 18.1: CW+; 18.3: CBS

Ownership
- Owner: Gray Media; (Gray Television Licensee, LLC)
- Sister stations: KNHL, KOLN/KGIN, KSNB-TV

History
- First air date: August 9, 1999
- Former call signs: K18CD (1999–2011); K18CD-D (2011–2018)
- Former channel numbers: Analog: 18 (UHF, 1999–2011)
- Call sign meaning: The CW, Huskers

Technical information
- Licensing authority: FCC
- Facility ID: 21165
- ERP: 15 kW
- HAAT: 112.7 m (370 ft)
- Transmitter coordinates: 40°49′17″N 96°39′44″W
- Translator(s): KNHL 18.1 Hastings; KIIT-CD 11.2 North Platte

Links
- Public license information: LMS

KCWH-LD (channel 18) is a low-power television station in Lincoln, Nebraska, United States, affiliated with The CW Plus. It is owned by Gray Media alongside CBS affiliates KOLN/KGIN (channels 10 and 11) in Lincoln and Grand Island, NBC affiliate KSNB-TV (channel 4) in York, and MeTV affiliate KNHL (channel 5) in Hastings. KCWH-LD is broadcast from a tower at the KOLN studios on North 40th Street in Lincoln.

For most of its history, KCWH-LD, under the call sign K18CD, served as a translator for KSNB-TV, whose signal was weak in Lincoln until its transmitter was moved to the KOLN tower near Beaver Crossing in 2022. It signed on in 1999, when KSNB-TV broadcast Fox programming; in 2009, the parent station left the air, only intermittently broadcasting until shortly before Gray acquired it in 2013. K18CD-D, now a digital station, continued to provide a rebroadcast of KSNB-TV, which broadcast MyNetworkTV programming before becoming the regional NBC affiliate in 2014. In 2018, after K18CD-D lost its tower in a collapse, Gray converted the station into a standalone CW+ affiliate, simulcast on subchannels of KNHL and Fox affiliate KIIT-CD (channel 11) in North Platte.

== History ==
=== Translator of KSNB-TV ===
The original construction permit for a translator station on channel 18 in Lincoln was granted on January 4, 1988, and issued the call sign K18CD. It was one of two translators that had been issued for the rebroadcast of KSNB-TV, at the time one of the ABC affiliates in the Nebraska Television Network (NTV); the other was K22CX (channel 22). K22CX began broadcasting in 1994. This service fulfilled a longstanding ambition of the network to expand to Lincoln and Lancaster County, which had nearly twice as many TV households as the Tri-Cities area. However, the Lincoln translator attracted little interest locally, and NTV was not added on cable there.

After Pappas Telecasting took over the operations of NTV in 1996, it switched KSNB-TV from ABC to Fox in September, simulcasting with NTV-managed KTVG-TV in Grand Island. KSNB-TV was never owned directly by Pappas; because its signal overlapped with Pappas-owned KPTM in Omaha, Pappas assigned the right to buy the station to Colins Broadcasting Company. The sales of NTV to Pappas and KSNB to Colins were approved by the FCC on February 17, 1999, and completed on May 24. In August 1999, Colins applied for a license to cover for the station, indicating it had started broadcasting. By 2001, KSNB-TV was broadcast from channel 18 and from channel 22.

==== Silence and sale to Gray ====
On June 12, 2009, Pappas converted KCWL-TV, an affiliate of The CW it managed in Lincoln, to Fox Nebraska as KFXL-TV, which in turn was simulcast as a subchannel from the NTV stations. This fulfilled an ambition of Pappas that dated to the late 1990s. With Fox network coverage shifted to KFXL and the NTV transmitters, the operating agreements Pappas held to run KSNB-TV and KTVG-TV ended. The time brokerage agreement between Pappas Telecasting and Colins Broadcasting Corporation, expired on November 30, 2009; that station, along with the two translators in Lincoln owned by Colins, shut down on December 1. (KSNB-TV's Beatrice translator, K17CI, had already left the air on June 12, 2009.) On December 19, 2011, the station converted to digital operations as K18CD-D. By then, the Colins stations were broadcasting intermittently with programming from the Three Angels Broadcasting Network.

Gray Television filed to buy KSNB-TV and its Lincoln translators from Colins Broadcasting in 2012. The Lincoln–Hastings–Kearney market has only five full-power stations (KOLN/KGIN and KHGI/KWNB are both counted as single stations for ratings and regulatory purposes), not enough to legally permit a duopoly. Colins and Gray sought a failing station waiver to allow the acquisition to move forward. (Note: The FCC can issue a failing station waiver allowing for the creation of a duopoly in markets otherwise too small to permit one legally (as is the case in Lincoln), or involving two stations rated in the top four, under certain circumstances relating to lack of other suitable buyers; low ratings; three years of negative cash flow; and public interest benefit of the merger.) After the FCC granted the assignment of the license to Gray, the sale was officially completed on February 25, 2013. KSNB-TV then became "10/11 Central Nebraska", a MyNetworkTV affiliate, in 2013. KSNB-TV's programming changed again when Gray acquired the assets and NBC affiliation of KHAS-TV in Hastings in 2014; this programming moved to KSNB-TV.

=== CW affiliate ===
On October 20, 2017, the 500-foot (150 m) tower in Lincoln leased by K18CD-D and KFXL-TV collapsed, rendering the translator out of commission. On May 18, 2018, the call letters were changed to KCWH-LD. It returned to the air on September 26, 2018, transmitting from the KOLN studios; on October 1, Gray announced that KCWH-LD had become the market's CW affiliate and would be simulcast on subchannels of KNHL in Hastings and KIIT-CD in North Platte. There had not been a CW affiliate broadcast in the market since KCWL-TV became KFXL-TV in 2009.

== Subchannels ==
The station's signal is multiplexed:

Subchannels of KCWH-LD
Channel	Res.	Short name	Programming
18.1	720p	CW HD	The CW Plus
18.3	1080i	KOLN-DT	CBS (KOLN/KGIN)

Simulcast of subchannels of another station
