= KSNB-TV =

Television station in York, Nebraska

- York–Lincoln, Nebraska; United States
- City: York, Nebraska (Note: Originally licensed to Superior, Nebraska; moved to York in 2022.)
- Channels: Digital: 24 (UHF); Virtual: 4
- Branding: Local 4

Programming
- Affiliations: 4.1: NBC; 4.2: MyNetworkTV/MeTV; for others, see § Subchannels

Ownership
- Owner: Gray Media; (Gray Television Licensee, LLC)
- Sister stations: KCWH-LD/KNHL, KOLN/KGIN

History
- First air date: October 1, 1965
- Former call signs: KHTL-TV (1965–1974)
- Former channel numbers: Analog: 4 (VHF, 1965–2009); Digital: 34 (UHF, 2004–2009), 4 (VHF, 2009–2022)
- Former affiliations: ABC (1965–1996); Fox (secondary 1994–1996, primary 1996–2009); UPN (secondary, 1996–1998 and 2000–2005); Dark (2009–2011); 3ABN (2011–2012); Antenna TV (2012–2013); MyNetworkTV (2013–2014); MeTV (2013–2014)
- Call sign meaning: Kansas and Nebraska, from when the station was located at Superior, Nebraska

Technical information
- Licensing authority: FCC
- Facility ID: 21161
- ERP: 260 kW
- HAAT: 429.7 m (1,410 ft)
- Transmitter coordinates: 40°48′11″N 97°10′53″W
- Translator(s): KGIN 11.2 Grand Island

Links
- Public license information: Public file; LMS
- Website: www.ksnblocal4.com

KSNB-TV (channel 4) is a television station licensed to York, Nebraska, United States, serving southeastern and central Nebraska as an affiliate of NBC. It is owned by Gray Media alongside CBS affiliates KOLN/KGIN (channels 10 and 11) in Lincoln and Grand Island, CW+ affiliate KCWH-LD (channel 18) in Lincoln, and MeTV affiliate KNHL (channel 5) in Hastings. KSNB-TV's transmitter is located near Beaver Crossing, Nebraska. Its news operations are primarily based at a studio located north of Hastings on US 281, with a secondary news bureau and sales office on West State Street in Grand Island. Master control and some internal operations are based at KOLN's facilities on North 40th Street in Lincoln. The KSNB-TV signal reaches Lincoln; in the Tri-Cities area of the market, KSNB-TV is broadcast as a subchannel of KGIN.

Channel 4 in central Nebraska was originally allocated to Superior at the request of Bi-States Company, owner of the Kearney-based Nebraska Television Network (NTV) of ABC affiliates, and began operation as KHTL-TV in October 1965 as a rebroadcaster for NTV. The call letters were changed to KSNB-TV in 1974; in the late 1980s and early 1990s, translators were set up in Beatrice and Lincoln, though NTV was never added to cable systems in Lincoln, where KOLN and Omaha stations dominated viewing and Tri-Cities stations like NTV were not seen.

After NTV was sold to Pappas Telecasting in 1996, KSNB-TV was switched from ABC to simulcasting Fox affiliate KTVG-TV (channel 17) in Grand Island, with the two stations becoming known as "Fox 4 & 17". Because KSNB-TV's signal overlapped with Omaha Fox affiliate KPTM, which Pappas also owned, the license was held by Colins Broadcasting Corporation, with Pappas providing programming. KSNB-TV was added to Lincoln cable systems for the first time in 2003 because, unlike KPTM, it carried select UPN programs. In November 2009, after Pappas launched KFXL-TV as the Fox affiliate in Lincoln, it terminated its agreement with Colins, and KSNB-TV left the air.

After only sporadically broadcasting, Gray Television acquired KSNB-TV under a failing station waiver in 2013. Initially, KSNB-TV broadcast the MyNetworkTV and local programming from "10/11 Central Nebraska", which had been the secondary subchannel of KOLN and KGIN. However, when Gray acquired Hoak Media in 2014 but could not acquire Hoak-owned KHAS-TV, the NBC affiliate in Hastings, KSNB-TV assumed its NBC affiliation and news operation. KSNB-TV also replaced Omaha NBC affiliate WOWT on Lincoln cable, whereas KHAS-TV had never been broadcast there. In 2022, as part of the rebuild of KOLN's Beaver Crossing tower, KSNB-TV changed its city of license from Superior to York and switched to broadcasting on the UHF band, which improved its coverage.

== History ==
=== NTV comes to Superior ===
In 1960, Bi-States Company, owner of KHOL-TV in Kearney and KHPL-TV in Hayes Center, proposed the addition of channel 4 as an allotment to Superior, to the southeast of Kearney. In November 1962, the FCC affirmed the assignment of channel 4, as well as channel 8 in Albion. Formal applications were then made for Superior and Albion in November 1963, with construction permits issued in February 1964 for both stations. Albion was built first, signing on as KHQL-TV on December 3, 1964. KHTL-TV in Superior followed on October 1, 1965. The four stations then began branding as the Nebraska Television Network.

In 1974, Bi-States sold the stations to NTV Enterprises for $1.9 million. On June 3, the new owners changed channel 4's call letters to KSNB-TV, as its signal reached parts of Kansas in addition to Nebraska.

Joseph Amaturo bought the NTV stations in 1979 in an $8.5 million deal funded by the sale of KQTV in St. Joseph, Missouri. KCNA, the former KHQL-TV, was split off from NTV on November 1, 1983, to become an independent station under the call letters KBGT-TV. Amaturo Group sold KSNB-TV, KHGI-TV, and KWNB-TV to Gordon Broadcasting for $10 million in 1985; the sale separated the NTV stations from KBGT, which was sold separately a year later to Citadel Communications and became KCAN, a satellite of Sioux City, Iowa's KCAU-TV. Citadel later moved KCAN to Lincoln as a stand-alone station, KLKN.

Gordon Broadcasting planned to sell the NTV stations to Sterling Communications for $11 million in 1989. However, the Sterling sale was not completed, and in May, ownership reverted to Joseph Amaturo under a court-appointed receivership. The next month, Chicago-based Heller Financial sued Gordon Broadcasting; Gordon had borrowed $7 million from Heller to purchase the stations and still owed the entire principal and $1.6 million in interest on the loan. Joseph Girard was appointed successor receiver in 1991. During this time, NTV was put on the market; a bid by Pappas Telecasting in 1990 received court approval, but the company failed to obtain financing, while television meteorologist John Coleman later sought to purchase the stations. Under Girard, who operated NTV through Girard Communications, KHGI-TV, KWNB-TV, and KSNB-TV were sold to Fant Broadcasting, owner of WNAL-TV in Gadsden, Alabama, for $2 million in 1993. The Fant purchase took a year to come together because the receivership status required the company to buy NTV's assets on an individual basis.

On April 1, 1994, Fant took over the operations of Hill Broadcasting Company's KTVG (channel 17), an upstart independent station in Grand Island in the process of joining Fox, under a local marketing agreement (LMA). KTVG then became a Fox affiliate; the NTV ABC stations took on a secondary Fox affiliation to carry the network's NFL coverage.

In July 1995, Fant announced a deal to sell KHGI, KWNB, and KSNB to Blackstar, LLC, a minority-controlled company in which nonvoting equity interests were held by Fox Television Stations and Silver King Communications, for $13 million. Blackstar was a vehicle for acquiring stations in medium- to small markets and switching them from their existing network affiliations to Fox, and the company stated its intent to switch the NTV stations to Fox if the deal were approved. However, the deal hit a snag for other reasons. Fant Broadcasting had applied for a newly allocated channel 18 at Albion. That allocation had been made because Citadel Communications was in the process of moving KCAN to Lincoln, where it would become a standalone ABC affiliate; a replacement TV station needed to be established at Albion if channel 8 were to be moved to Lincoln, and Citadel had also filed for that channel. (Note: This was resolved by also adding channel 24 to Albion. Citadel's channel 24 station operated as KLKE from 1996 to 2003.) When the Blackstar sale agreement was filed with the FCC, Citadel lodged a protest, feeling that Fant Broadcasting had attempted to block its Lincoln proposal by applying for Albion; company president Anthony Fant denied this, noting that his main goal for seeking the Albion channel was to restore the coverage lost a decade prior and "try to put that part of the NTV puzzle back together". Citadel's objection, as well as two federal government shutdowns, delayed FCC approval; Fant walked away from the deal in May 1996 because of continuing delays.

KSNB-TV gained two translators, as part of NTV expansion plans first floated in the late 1980s, at Beatrice and Lincoln. Channel 22 in Lincoln, K22CX, began broadcasting in 1994. This service fulfilled a longstanding ambition of the network to expand to Lincoln and Lancaster County, which had nearly twice as many TV households as the Tri-Cities area. However, the Lincoln translator attracted little interest locally and NTV was not added on cable there.

=== From ABC to Fox ===
In July 1996, Fant agreed to sell KSNB-TV, KHGI-TV, and KWNB-TV to Pappas Telecasting for $12.75 million. Pappas immediately assumed control of the NTV stations through a local marketing agreement that began on July 1 and, that September, switched KSNB, as well as the Lincoln and Beatrice translators, to rebroadcasting KTVG and Fox; KHGI and KWNB remained with ABC. In 1997, Pappas sold its right to acquire KSNB to Colins Broadcasting Company for $10, with Colins paying $333,333 to Fant, as channel 4's signal overlapped with Pappas's Omaha station, KPTM. Pappas also entered into an LMA with Colins to continue operating KSNB. The sales of KHGI and KWNB to Pappas and KSNB to Colins were approved by the FCC on February 17, 1999, and completed on May 24.

Logo for KSNB and KTVG until the relaunch of KFXL in July 2009

KSNB-TV and KTVG dropped their secondary affiliation with UPN in January 1998; however, the network's programming returned to the stations in 2000. This was noteworthy because Time Warner Cable, which ran the cable system in Lincoln, added KSNB to its lineup in early 2003 expressly because of its carriage of select UPN programs; previously, the KSNB translators were the only way of receiving the network in town. UPN programming was removed again in September 2005, when KOLN and KGIN launched a UPN-affiliated subchannel.

=== Between Fox and Gray ===
On June 12, 2009, Pappas converted KCWL-TV, an affiliate of The CW it managed in Lincoln, to Fox Nebraska as KFXL-TV. This fulfilled an ambition of Pappas that dated to the late 1990s. Additionally, Fox Nebraska was added to subchannels of the NTV stations at Kearney and Hayes Center. This came months after a web page briefly indicated that the Fox affiliation would move to subchannels of KOLN and KGIN, a page labeled by a station official as a "leftover piece of an experimental project". That same day, KSNB-TV converted to exclusively digital broadcasting on the national transition date, returning from ultra high frequency (UHF) channel 34 to channel 4.

With Fox network coverage shifted to KFXL and the NTV transmitters, the operating agreements Pappas held to run KSNB-TV and KTVG-TV ended. The time brokerage agreement between Pappas Telecasting and Colins Broadcasting Corporation expired on November 30, 2009; that station, along with the two translators in Lincoln owned by Colins, shut down on December 1. KSNB-TV's Beatrice translator, K17CI, had already left the air on June 12, 2009. KTVG-TV followed suit on April 5, 2010. To keep the license active, Colins was approved to broadcast a temporary, 225-watt signal at low power in 2010; in its filing seeking the facility, it noted that it had been in litigation with Pappas for years over the use of the KSNB-TV transmitter site, which Pappas continued to own, and that it was affected by the bankruptcy of its principal owner. The station intermittently operated for some time, carrying 3ABN programming. On June 23, 2011, Colins Broadcasting filed an application with the FCC to increase the effective radiated power of the station to 23.5 kW and move the transmitter site to the existing tower of FM radio station KTMX, near York, roughly 50 miles (80 km) northeast of the original site and closer to Lincoln.

=== Sale to Gray Television and MyNetworkTV affiliation ===
On November 21, 2012, Gray Television, the owner of KOLN/KGIN, announced it would acquire KSNB-TV and its translators in Lincoln for $1.25 million. The Lincoln–Hastings–Kearney market has only five full-power stations (KOLN/KGIN and KHGI/KWNB are both counted as single stations for ratings and regulatory purposes), which was not enough to legally permit a duopoly under FCC rules of the time. Colins and Gray sought a failing station waiver to allow the acquisition to move forward. (Note: The FCC can issue a failing station waiver allowing for the creation of a duopoly in markets otherwise too small to permit one legally (as is the case in Lincoln), or involving two stations rated in the top four, under certain circumstances relating to lack of other suitable buyers; low ratings; three years of negative cash flow; and public interest benefit of the merger.) The station deal included Lincoln translators K18CD and KWAZ-LP. After the FCC granted the assignment of the license to Gray, the sale was officially completed on February 25.

On April 1, 2013, the station took the MyNetworkTV affiliation previously held by the second digital subchannels of both KOLN and KGIN under the moniker "10/11 Central Nebraska", a brand extension of KOLN/KGIN. 10/11 Central Nebraska also offered 5:30 and 9 p.m. newscasts from KOLN/KGIN and several local programs. On September 2, 2013, KSNB became an affiliate of MeTV.

=== NBC affiliation ===
On June 11, 2014, Hastings-based KHAS-TV (channel 5), the longtime NBC affiliate for the Tri-Cities portion of the market, announced on its website and Facebook page that it would leave the air at midnight on June 13. KHAS's owner, Hoak Media, had recently merged with Gray, and original plans called for it to be sold to Excalibur Broadcasting to satisfy duopoly rules; had this occurred, Gray would have operated the station under an LMA. However, increased FCC scrutiny of LMAs prompted Gray to shut down KHAS-TV instead. Its NBC affiliation, syndicated programming, and news department moved to KSNB-TV and the second subchannels of KOLN and KGIN. KSNB's MyNetworkTV and MeTV programming moved to its second subchannel as well as a third digital channel on KOLN and KGIN, with all channels being broadcast in high definition. (Note: Gray was later able to acquire channel 5, now KNHL, in 2019.)

In August 2014, KSNB replaced Gray-owned WOWT in Omaha, long the default NBC affiliate for Lincoln and the eastern portion of the market, on Time Warner Cable's channel 6 position; in 2016, the remaining standard-definition channel slot for WOWT was removed. Lincoln-area cable systems historically had never carried KHAS-TV, instead opting to carry WOWT. After the NBC affiliation change, the station briefly continued to brand as channel 5, inherited from KHAS-TV, until changing to "NBC Nebraska" in October.

=== Move to York ===
In January 2020, the KOLN tower near Beaver Crossing collapsed in an ice storm. That August, Gray sought approval to make major upgrades to KSNB-TV's transmitter. In filings with the FCC, Gray called the old channel 4 facility "grossly inadequate" and "unsuitable for digital broadcasting when it was installed"; Gray noted that Colins had limited resources and had used older equipment that failed to meet signal coverage expectations. It also proposed to change KSNB-TV's city of license from Superior to York and switch the station from low-VHF channel 4 to ultra high frequency (UHF) channel 24, with the new transmitter being co-sited at KOLN's rebuilt tower. The FCC approved the channel and city of license on August 23, 2021. KSNB-TV began broadcasting from the new Beaver Crossing tower when it was activated in March 2022.

== News operation ==
Upon the 2014 transfer of KHAS-TV and its programs to KSNB-TV, that station's Hastings-based news operation and newscasts moved to this station.

== Technical information ==
=== Subchannels ===
KSNB-TV is broadcast from a tower at Beaver Crossing. Its signal is multiplexed:

Subchannels of KSNB-TV
Subchannel	Res.	Short name	Programming
4.1	720p	KSNB-DT	NBC
4.2	480i	MEMY TV	MeTV & MyNetworkTV
4.3	480i	ION	Ion
4.5	480i	Oxygen	Oxygen
4.6	480i	OUT	Outlaw

Simulcast of subchannels of another station

=== Translators ===
KSNB-TV formerly repeated its programming on one translator station, K18CD-D, licensed to Lincoln. On October 20, 2017, the broadcast tower for the Lincoln translator collapsed, rendering the translator out of commission. It returned to the air September 26, 2018, as CW affiliate KCWH-LD.

== See also ==
- Channel 24 digital TV stations in the United States
- Channel 4 virtual TV stations in the United States
