= KOLN =

Television station in Lincoln, Nebraska

KOLN and KGIN

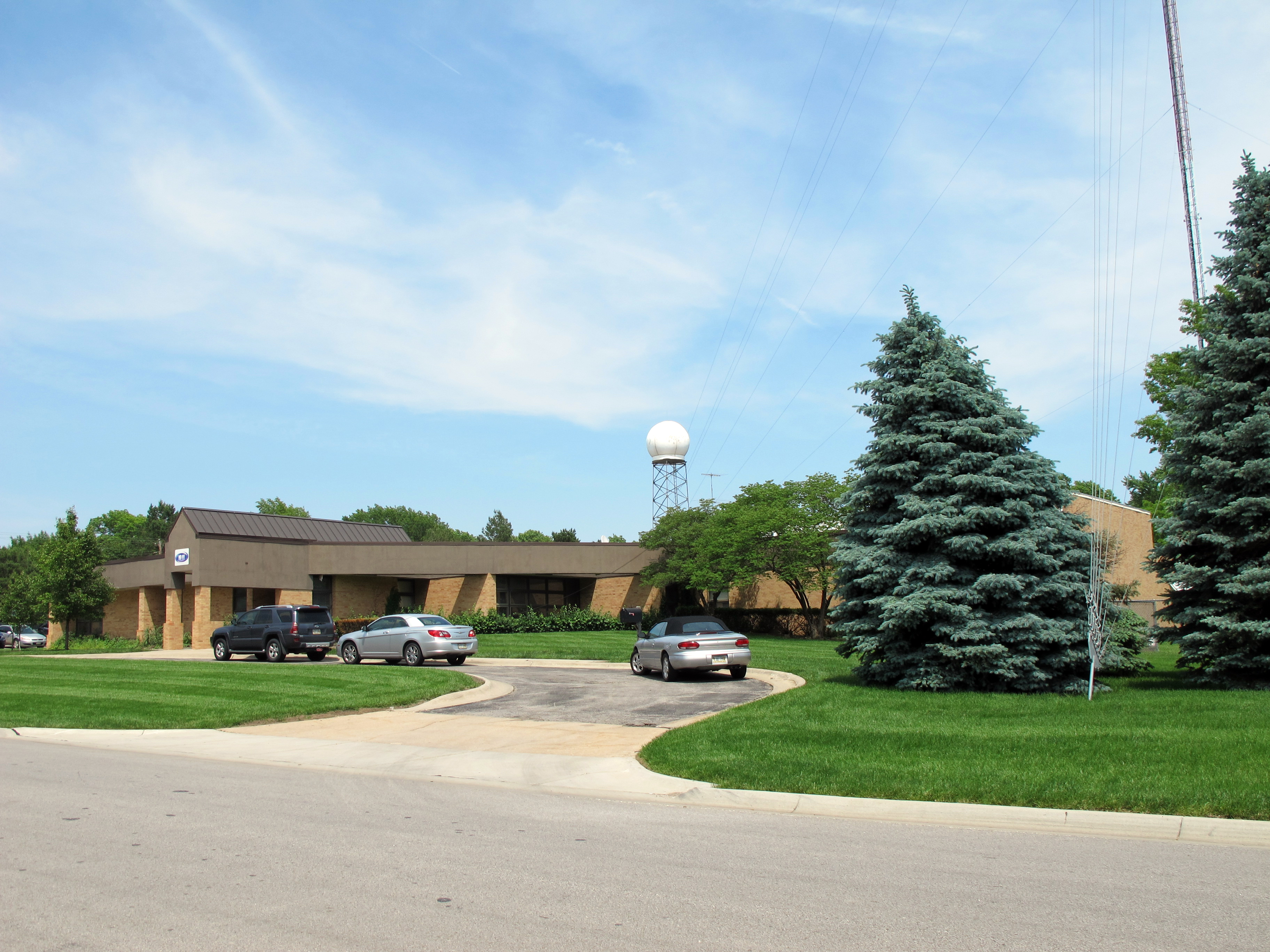
- The KOLN/KGIN studios at 40th and Vine streets in Lincoln.

KOLN: Lincoln, Nebraska; KGIN: Grand Island–Hastings–Kearney, Nebraska; United States
- Channels for KOLN: Digital: 10 (VHF); Virtual: 10
- Channels for KGIN: Digital: 11 (VHF); Virtual: 11
- Branding: 10/11; 10/11 Now

Programming
- Affiliations: 10.1/11.1: CBS; 11.2: NBC; for others, see § Technical information

Ownership
- Owner: Gray Media; (Gray Television Licensee, LLC)
- Sister stations: KCWH-LD, KNHL, KSNB-TV

History
- First air date: KOLN: February 18, 1953; KGIN: October 1, 1961
- Former call signs: KOLN: KOLN-TV (1953–1986); KGIN: KGIN-TV (1961–1986)
- Former channel number: KOLN: Analog: 12 (VHF, 1953–1954), 10 (VHF, 1954–2009); Digital: 25 (UHF, until 2009); KGIN: Analog: 11 (VHF, 1961–2009); Digital: 32 (UHF, until 2009)
- Former affiliations: KOLN: DuMont (1953–1954); ABC (secondary, 1954–1957)
- Call sign meaning: KOLN: Lin(C)KOLN; KGIN: Grand Island, Nebraska

Technical information
- Licensing authority: FCC
- Facility ID: KOLN: 7890; KGIN: 7894
- ERP: KOLN: 66.1 kW; KGIN: 25 kW
- HAAT: KOLN: 454 m (1,490 ft); KGIN: 314.6 m (1,032 ft)
- Transmitter coordinates: KOLN: 40°48′11″N 97°10′53″W; KGIN: 40°35′14″N 98°48′10″W
- Translators: KNPL-LD 10.1 North Platte; for others, see § Translators

Links
- Public license information: KOLN: Public file; LMS; KGIN: Public file; LMS
- Website: www.1011now.com

KOLN (channel 10) in Lincoln, Nebraska, and KGIN (channel 11) in Grand Island, Nebraska, together branded as 10/11, are television stations serving as the CBS affiliates for southeastern and central Nebraska. Owned by Gray Media, 10/11 maintains studios on North 40th Street in Lincoln and a news bureau and sales office on West State Street in Grand Island; KOLN's transmitter is located near Beaver Crossing, while KGIN's is near Heartwell. The stations serve southern and central Nebraska as well as portions of far northern Kansas.

KOLN began broadcasting on channel 12 in 1953 and was originally a sole affiliate of the DuMont Television Network. It was bought by John Fetzer soon after its debut. Fetzer bought KFOR-TV, the original channel 10, in 1954. This led to an effective merger of the two stations, with KOLN as the survivor. KOLN moved to channel 10 from a new, higher-coverage transmitter site later that year and joined CBS; the channel 12 facility was transferred to the University of Nebraska and became KUON-TV. This left KOLN without competition based in Lincoln for more than 40 years.

To further increase its reach, Fetzer built KGIN-TV at Grand Island in 1961. 10/11, as the combination became known, dominated the ratings in its enlarged market. Despite a news presentation that remained stubbornly traditional and even stodgy into the 1980s, the station built up a loyal news audience, particularly in rural areas, competing against stations from Omaha in the Lincoln area and two network affiliates in the Tri-Cities portion. The purchases of KOLN and KGIN-TV by Gillett Communications in 1985 and Busse Broadcasting in 1987 heralded a shift toward a more modern style of newscasting.

Gray acquired KOLN/KGIN in 1998. In the 2010s, the company's Nebraska operations grew with the 2013 purchase of KSNB-TV (channel 4), which became the market's NBC affiliate the next year when it acquired the non-license assets of KHAS-TV (channel 5) in Hastings (now sister station and MeTV affiliate KNHL). A semi-satellite of KOLN/KGIN-TV, KNPL-LD "10/11 North Platte", is the CBS affiliate for North Platte.

== History ==
=== Early years ===
In 1952, Lincoln radio station KOLN (1400 AM) was acquired by the Cornhusker Radio and Television Corporation from Inland Broadcasting Corporation of Omaha. Inland had filed for a permit to construct a KOLN television station, which was replaced by a new application from Cornhusker seeking channel 12. KOLN-TV received its construction permit from the Federal Communications Commission (FCC) on October 2, 1952, and announced plans for a tower at 40th and W, where KOLN radio was located. A second Lincoln station, KFOR-TV, was authorized to the Cornbelt Broadcasting Company to operate on channel 10. KOLN-TV began telecasting programming on February 18, 1953. It was a sole affiliate of the DuMont Television Network. KFOR-TV, an ABC affiliate, followed on May 31.

Channel 12 had been on the air for five months when John Fetzer of Kalamazoo, Michigan, acquired KOLN radio and television from Cornhusker. Under Fetzer, KOLN began planning for a major upgrade. It applied for and received authority to erect a 1,000-foot (300 m) tower and maximum-power transmitter facility east of Beaver Crossing in order to expand its coverage area.

On February 17, 1954, Fetzer announced he was purchasing KFOR-TV from Stuart Investment Company. The Beaver Crossing facility would be constructed to utilize channel 10 instead of 12, and KOLN intended to discard DuMont programming in favor of KFOR-TV's ABC affiliation. However, this required action to divest or surrender the channel 12 facility. Even though FCC approval of the channel 10 acquisition came in March, Fetzer had yet to find a buyer for channel 12. It was spun out into a trust to make it available to the University of Nebraska or another educational institution. The trust assumed the channel in July 1954 on behalf of the university. Fetzer's effective consolidation of KFOR-TV and KOLN left channel 10 the only commercial station in Lincoln.

KOLN became a CBS affiliate on June 15, 1954, and moved to channel 10 on August 1 from its new Beaver Crossing transmitter facility. The existing channel 12 transmitter facility and use of KOLN's studios went to the new educational station, which debuted as KUON-TV on November 1. DuMont ceased its existence as a network in 1955, while KOLN remained an ABC affiliate even after KETV began broadcasting in Omaha in 1957.

=== Regional expansion ===
When KOLN went on the air, it financially struggled. In its first nine months, it lost some $25,000 a month; it had a poor movie selection and was initially saddled with meager offerings from DuMont. The construction of the Beaver Crossing transmitter and move to channel 10 marked the start of a commitment to expand the station's service area well beyond Lincoln. In the Lincoln area, general manager A. James Ebel had an idea. The station gave out television antennas with directions for viewers to point their antennas west toward Beaver Crossing and away from Omaha. West of Lincoln, where the Omaha stations' signals did not reach, a station study found that there was a significant number of charge accounts at Lincoln department stores. In 1959, the Electron Corporation of Dallas, a manufacturer of television equipment, began applying for television station permits in small markets throughout the country, including channel 11 at Grand Island. Electron hoped to use the Grand Island station and others as demonstrations of equipment it claimed would make it 70 percent cheaper to set up new TV stations. Electron obtained the permit and gave it the call sign KGIN-TV. However, instead of building the station, it sold the permit to Fetzer, who intended to use channel 11 as a full-power satellite of KOLN-TV.

KGIN-TV began broadcasting on October 1, 1961. A three-hop microwave transmission link from Lincoln carried KOLN programming to the channel 11 transmitter facility at Heartwell. The initial performance of the facility was poor, which was discovered to be due to a mis-assembly of the antenna. It had been incorrectly marked at the factory and, when assembled, sent most of its signal up. A station spokesman noted, "We probably had a good signal on the moon, but this installation wasn't designed to serve the moon." The Grand Island station completed a studio with live telecasting capability in 1967, which moved to the Hotel Yancey in 1969. KGIN continued to have offices at the Yancey as late as 1990. Both stations began to broadcast live color programs on May 22, 1967. Further translators began carrying KOLN/KGIN-TV as far west as North Platte, with 18 in service by 1973.

With the Grand Island satellite in place, KOLN-TV began branding itself as 10/11. It became one of the highest-rated television stations in its market in the United States in total-day ratings, late afternoon ratings, and other metrics. Its late newscast attracted more than 60 percent of area television viewers in the 1970s. It also became a profitable venture for Fetzer. Other local programs debuted, such as the Morning Show and Cartoon Corral. After 1967, both programs had the same host, Leta Powell Drake, who also hosted local commercials. Cartoon Corral left the air in 1982.

=== Gillett and Busse ownership ===
After 31 years of ownership, in August 1985, Fetzer announced the sale of KOLN and KGIN-TV—as well as WKZO-TV in Kalamazoo, Michigan, and KMEG in Sioux City, Iowa—to Gillett Communications of Nashville, Tennessee. The change of ownership resulted in the end of several local programs, including Romper Room (after 22 years, as its host ran for office), Etc., and For Children Only, as well as a more adversarial relationship between management and the unionized staff than had been the case under Fetzer.

In 1987, Gillett conducted a buyout of Storer Communications. With this acquisition, Gillett now had 14 stations, more than the limit of 12 then in place. Five of Gillett's smaller stations, including KOLN/KGIN-TV, were spun off to a new company, Busse Broadcasting Corporation, which was run by and named for the former general manager of WEAU-TV in Eau Claire, Wisconsin, one of the stations included in the transaction. Busse Broadcasting was originally announced to be owned by Lawrence A. Busse and a trust set up for George N. Gillett Jr.'s children; the FCC rejected complaints from members of Congress after Gillett himself bought non-voting stock in the company. In 1996, Citadel Communications moved the former KCAN-TV into Lincoln as KLKN (channel 8), giving KOLN its first competition within Lincoln since 1954.

=== Gray ownership ===
In 1995, Busse declared Chapter 11 bankruptcy and reorganized. After suspending attempts to sell its stations in 1996, Busse sold its television properties to Gray Communications Systems in 1998. The $112 million purchase brought Gray out of the southeastern U.S. for the first time.

KOLN launched a second subchannel in 2005 to carry UPN programming to digital-equipped viewers and on cable. The subchannel affiliated with MyNetworkTV in 2006. For a time in January 2009, the KOLN/KGIN website included a section about a Fox affiliate on its second digital subchannel (then used for MyNetworkTV, which was to have moved to a third digital subchannel). However, station officials later said there were no immediate plans to launch such a station, describing the page as part of an experimental project not meant for public consumption. At that time, the rights to Fox programming in the Lincoln–Hastings–Kearney market belonged to KSNB-TV in the eastern half of the market and KTVG-TV in the west.

Gray has expanded its central and western Nebraska media holdings beyond 10/11. In 2012, it moved to acquire KSNB-TV, which had lost its Fox affiliation. In an effort to trade on the success of the 10/11 brand, KSNB was relaunched in 2013 as "10/11 Central Nebraska", which aired programming from MyNetworkTV and MeTV. 10/11 Central Nebraska also offered 5:30 and 9 p.m. newscasts from KOLN/KGIN and several local programs. That same year, the North Platte translator began offering separate newscasts as KNPL-LD "10/11 North Platte". In 2014, Gray acquired the assets of KHAS-TV in Hastings and moved its NBC affiliation and programming to KSNB-TV.

In January 2020, the KOLN tower near Beaver Crossing collapsed in an ice storm. KOLN and most of its subchannels were broadcast from Gray-owned KCWH-LD (channel 18) in the immediate Lincoln area, while KLKN offered two of its subchannels to KOLN and KSNB. A new tower at the Beaver Crossing site was activated in November 2021, and in March 2022, KSNB-TV began broadcasting from the same site.

== News operation ==
For years in much of the Nebraska countryside, the glow of a television through the window of a farm house at 10:15 p.m. meant only one thing: Mel Mains was giving the Channel 10 news.

— Lincoln Journal Star editorial board, upon the 1998 passing of A. James Ebel

Newscasts on KOLN/KGIN-TV hewed to the same format for most of the time from the 1950s to the mid-1980s. Under A. James Ebel, KOLN's general manager from 1954 to 1985, 10/11 newscasts began with an in-depth weather report as a service to the station's large rural audience. In a 1977 interview, Ebel stated, "The first thing I learned when I arrived here in 1954 is that the weather is the No. 1 story in Nebraska." After the weather came the state and local news, read on weeknights by Mel Mains, who joined the staff in 1961 and spent nearly 34 years at 10/11. This was followed by the national news. For many years, the national news was read by Bob Taylor—an original station employee who served at the station until his death in 1981, the last 20 of those years as news director; he also doubled as weathercaster. The news presentation was no-frills and straight and remained so even as flashier news formats began to make their mark nationally in the 1970s and made 10/11's newscasts begin to appear dated, even stodgy. A 1982 story on Mains in the Lincoln Sunday Journal and Star noted that his "facial expressions contain more granite than Mount Rushmore". Some Lincoln viewers believed KOLN's news was too regional in focus. While Lincoln was by far the largest city in 10/11's coverage area, it only represented 20 percent of its viewership. In spite of its market-wide dominance, KOLN had lower ratings in Lincoln itself, where the Omaha stations provided competition and more dynamic, up-to-date news presentations. In response, station manager Paul Jensen said in 1983 that 10/11 did not consider itself merely a Lincoln station but a regional station for all of southeastern and central Nebraska. In a 1994 retrospective, Tom Johnson of the Lincoln Journal described 10/11's news of the era as "rigidly compartmentalized and dull, dull, dull", chastising the format for its lack of flexibility to put lead news stories in their proper place in the program. For example, KOLN did not announce the news of the death of Pope Paul VI until 15 minutes into a 1978 newscast. Under Fetzer's stewardship, 10/11's dominance was so absolute that there was little incentive to change; as a Journal Star editorial on Ebel's death in 1998 put it, "there was no competition" from other stations.

The Gillett purchase in 1985 portended major changes as the new management instituted a more contemporary news format. The weather forecast was moved to the middle of the newscast in June 1986, and the newscast lost the serious tone that had characterized it. These changes climaxed in 1987 with the introduction of a modern news set and a co-anchor for Mains: Deb Collins of Chattanooga, Tennessee. 10/11's news began to resemble newscasts in other markets. This did not hurt its ratings performance in either half of the market. It led KETV of Omaha in the Lincoln portion of the market and the Nebraska Television Network (NTV) in the Tri-Cities (Kearney, Hastings, Grand Island) portion.

The arrival of KLKN to the Lincoln market in 1996 brought changes as 10/11 sought to head off competition. Newscasts featured more live reports, and KGIN-TV began airing a local news insert for the Tri-Cities and central Nebraska, allowing KOLN to present more Lincoln news. Despite this, some viewers continued to remember 10/11 for its more conservative newscasts that began with the weather. The station debuted a 5 p.m. weeknight newscast in 2000.

At a time when cutbacks due to the Great Recession were the norm, Gray invested in expanding the KOLN/KGIN-TV news department. Between 2009 and 2011, the news department expanded by 13 employees, some hired from markets much larger than Lincoln, and the station started a 9 p.m. newscast targeted to the Tri-Cities portion of the market. In 2010, a 4 p.m. newscast debuted, anchored by the husband-and-wife anchor team of Jon and Taryn Vanderford. As of 2025, 10/11 produced 24 1/2 hours a week of local news programming as well as the lifestyle show Pure Nebraska, which airs six days a week.

=== Notable former on-air staff ===
- Vinita Nair – anchor/reporter, 2002–2003

== Technical information ==
The stations' signals are multiplexed. KGIN-TV also rebroadcasts the 4.1 subchannel of KSNB-TV and the 5.1 subchannel of KNHL.

=== KOLN subchannels ===
Subchannels of KOLN
Subchannel	Res.	Short name	Programming
10.1	1080i	KOLN-DT	CBS
10.2	720p	StartTV	Start TV
10.3	480i	CourtTV	Court TV
10.4	480i	H & I	Heroes & Icons
10.5	480i	365	365BLK
10.6	480i	TCN	True Crime Network

=== KGIN subchannels ===
Subchannels of KGIN
Subchannel	Res.	Short name	Programming
11.1	1080i	KGIN-DT	CBS
11.2	720p	KSNB-DT	NBC (KSNB-TV)
11.3	480i	MeMy-DT	MeTV (KNHL)
11.4	480i	H&I	Heroes & Icons
11.5	480i	365	365BLK
11.6	480i	Crime	True Crime Network

Simulcast of subchannels of another station

=== Analog-to-digital conversion ===
KOLN and KGIN-TV ceased analog broadcasting on February 16, 2009, just prior to the original digital television transition date. Both stations moved their digital transmissions from the UHF band (channel 25 in Lincoln, channel 32 in Grand Island) to their former analog channels on VHF.

=== Translators ===
Six translators supplement KOLN and KGIN-TV's signal coverage.

- Cambridge: K30FV-D (KGIN)
- Cozad: K24HG-D (KGIN)
- Gothenburg: K28GC-D (KGIN)
- Neligh: K33OW-D (KOLN)
- Newport: K25GM-D (KOLN)
- O'Neill: K29MD-D (KOLN)

Grade A signal contours for KOLN (channel 10) and all associated translators and satellites.; KOLN 10 Lincoln, NE and translators K33OW-D, K25GM-D and K29MD-D KGIN 11 Grand Island, NE and translators K30FV-D, K24HG-D and K28GC-D; KCWH-LD3 18.3 Lincoln, NE; KNPL-LD 10 North Platte, NE and translator K33FF-D
