= List of Charge! affiliates =

The following is a list of affiliates of Charge!, a digital subchannel network owned by the Sinclair Broadcast Group.

== Affiliates ==
List of Charge! affiliates
Media market	State/District	Station	Channel
Birmingham	Alabama	WBMA-LD	58.4
Florence–Huntsville–Decatur	Alabama	WHDF	15.4
Mobile	Alabama	WPMI-TV	15.3
Troy–Montgomery	Alabama	WIYC	48.7
Phoenix	Arizona	KAZT-TV	7.4
Tucson	Arizona	KOLD-TV	13.6
Yuma	Arizona	KVYE	7.4
Harrison	Arkansas	K26GS-D	26.5
Little Rock	Arkansas	KATV	7.3
Bakersfield	California	KBAK-TV	29.3
Eureka	California	KBVU	28.3
Fresno	California	KFRE-TV	59.2
Fresno	California	KFSN-TV	30.3
Los Angeles	California	KABC-TV	7.3
Palm Springs	California	KEVC-CD	5.4
Paradise–Chico–Redding	California	KCVU	20.3
San Francisco–Oakland–San Jose	California	KGO-TV	7.3
Denver	Colorado	KWGN-TV	2.2
Hartford–New Haven	Connecticut	WCTX	59.2
Washington	District of Columbia	WJLA-TV	7.2
Daytona Beach–Orlando	Florida	WOTF-TV	26.4
Gainesville	Florida	WNBW-DT	9.2
Jacksonville	Florida	WTLV	12.8
Miami–Fort Lauderdale	Florida	WBFS-TV	33.3
Tallahassee	Florida	WTWC-TV	40.3
Tampa–St. Petersburg	Florida	WFLA-TV	8.2
West Palm Beach–Boca Raton–Stuart–Fort Pierce	Florida	WWHB-CD	48.2
West Palm Beach–Boca Raton–Stuart–Fort Pierce	Florida	WPEC	12.2
Albany	Georgia	WFXL	31.4
Atlanta	Georgia	WUPA	69.6
Savannah	Georgia	WTGS	28.4
Boise	Idaho	KBOI-TV	2.3
Lewiston–Moscow	Idaho	KLEW-TV	3.2
Champaign–Urbana–Danville	Illinois	WICD	15.4
Chicago	Illinois	WLS-TV	7.3
Peoria–Bloomington–Normal	Illinois	WHOI	19.2
Springfield–Decatur	Illinois	WICS	20.4
Indianapolis	Indiana	WXIN	59.4
South Bend	Indiana	WSBT-TV	22.3
Cedar Rapids–Waterloo–Iowa City–Dubuque	Iowa	KFXA	28.2
Des Moines	Iowa	KDSM-TV	17.3
Sioux City	Iowa	KMEG	14.3
Hutchinson–Wichita	Kansas	KMTW	36.3
Danville–Lexington	Kentucky	WDKY-TV	56.3
Paducah	Kentucky	WDKA	49.2
Lafayette	Louisiana	K21OM-D	20.6
New Orleans	Louisiana	WNOL-TV	38.4
Waterville–Portland	Maine	WPFO	23.2
Baltimore	Maryland	WBFF	45.4
Bay City–Saginaw–Flint–Midland	Michigan	WBSF	46.3
Detroit	Michigan	WKBD-TV	50.3
Grand Rapids–Kalamazoo–Battle Creek	Michigan	WOTV	41.3
Sault Ste. Marie	Michigan	WGTQ	8.3
Traverse City–Cadillac	Michigan	WGTU	29.3
Minneapolis–Saint Paul	Minnesota	WUCW	23.3
Jefferson City–Columbia	Missouri	KRCG	13.3
Kirksville	Missouri	KTVO	3.4
Osage Beach–Springfield	Missouri	KRBK	49.3
St. Louis	Missouri	KDNL-TV	30.3
Bozeman	Montana	KDBZ-CD	6.3
Butte	Montana	KTVM-TV	6.3
Kalispell	Montana	KCFW-TV	9.3
Missoula	Montana	KECI-TV	13.3
Hayes Center–North Platte	Nebraska	KWNB-TV	6.4
Kearney–Hastings–Grand Island	Nebraska	KHGI-TV	13.4
Lincoln	Nebraska	KFXL-TV	51.3
Omaha	Nebraska	KXVO	15.3
Las Vegas	Nevada	KSNV	3.3
Reno	Nevada	KRXI-TV	11.3
Albuquerque–Santa Fe	New Mexico	KTFQ-TV	41.4
Clovis	New Mexico	KVIH-TV	12.5
Albany–Schenectady–Troy	New York	WCWN	45.2
Buffalo–Niagara Falls	New York	WUTV	29.3
New York City	New York	WABC-TV	7.3
Rochester	New York	WHAM-TV	13.3
Syracuse	New York	WTVH	5.2
Belmont–Charlotte	North Carolina	WJZY	46.3
Durham–Raleigh–Fayetteville	North Carolina	WRDC	28.2
Durham–Raleigh–Fayetteville	North Carolina	WTVD	11.3
Greenville–Washington–New Bern–Jacksonville	North Carolina	WYDO	14.2
Winston-Salem–Greensboro–High Point	North Carolina	WXLV-TV	45.3
Chillicothe–Columbus	Ohio	WWHO	53.2
Cleveland	Ohio	WJW	8.4
Dayton	Ohio	WRGT-TV	45.4
Toledo	Ohio	WNWO-TV	24.2
Oklahoma City	Oklahoma	KOKH-TV	25.2
Tulsa	Oklahoma	KOKI-TV	23.4
Coos Bay	Oregon	KCBY-TV	11.3
Eugene	Oregon	KVAL-TV	13.3
La Grande–Portland–Salem	Oregon	KUNP	16.3
La Grande–Portland–Salem	Oregon	KUNP-LD	47.3
Medford–Klamath Falls	Oregon	KTVL	10.5
Roseburg	Oregon	KPIC	4.3
Harrisburg–Lancaster–Lebanon–York	Pennsylvania	WHP-TV	21.4
Johnstown–Altoona–State College–DuBois–Bedford	Pennsylvania	WJAC-TV	6.2
Philadelphia	Pennsylvania	WPVI-TV	6.3
Pittsburgh	Pennsylvania	WPGH-TV	53.3
Wilkes-Barre–Scranton	Pennsylvania	WOLF-TV	56.4
Providence	Rhode Island	WJAR	10.2
Anderson–Greenville–Spartanburg	South Carolina	WMYA-TV	40.4
Charleston	South Carolina	WTAT-TV	24.4
Columbia	South Carolina	WACH	57.3
Florence–Myrtle Beach	South Carolina	WWMB	21.4
Cleveland–Chattanooga	Tennessee	WFLI-TV	53.4
Greenville–Bristol–Johnson City–Kingsport	Tennessee	WEMT	39.4
Knoxville	Tennessee	WVLT-TV	8.6
Memphis	Tennessee	WATN-TV	24.8
Nashville	Tennessee	WNAB	58.3
Nashville	Tennessee	WZTV	17.4
Amarillo	Texas	KVII-TV	7.5
Austin	Texas	KGBS-CD	19.3
Corpus Christi	Texas	KSCC	38.4
Dallas–Fort Worth	Texas	KDAF	33.4
Dallas–Fort Worth	Texas	KTXD-TV	47.3
El Paso	Texas	KFOX-TV	14.3
Houston	Texas	KTRK-TV	13.3
Laredo	Texas	KETF-CD	39.3
Midland–Odessa	Texas	KUPB	18.4
Port Arthur–Beaumont–Orange	Texas	KBTV-TV	4.2
San Angelo	Texas	KEUS-LD	41.3
San Antonio	Texas	WOAI-TV	4.4
Salt Lake City	Utah	KUTV	2.4
Lynchburg–Roanoke	Virginia	WSET-TV	13.2
Richmond–Petersburg	Virginia	WRLH-TV	35.4
Norfolk–Hampton Roads	Virginia	WTVZ-TV	33.2
Kennewick	Washington	KVVK-CD	15.4
Seattle–Tacoma	Washington	KOMO-TV	4.3
Walla Walla	Washington	KORX-CD	16.3
Yakima	Washington	KUNW-CD	2.4
Charleston–Huntington	West Virginia	WVAH-TV	11.4
Wheeling	West Virginia	WTOV-TV	9.3
Green Bay	Wisconsin	WCWF	14.3
Madison	Wisconsin	WMSN-TV	47.3
Milwaukee	Wisconsin	WVTV	24.3
