= Nebraska Television Network =

Television station in Kearney, Nebraska

Nebraska Television Network (NTV)

- Kearney–Hastings–Grand Island and North Platte, Nebraska; United States
- City: Kearney, Nebraska
- Channels: Virtual: 13, 6, 27

Programming
- Subchannels: x.1: ABC; 13.2/6.2: Fox; for others, see § Subchannels

Ownership
- Owner: Sinclair Broadcast Group; (KHGI Licensee, LLC)
- Sister stations: KFXL-TV

History
- First air date: December 25, 1953, with the launch of KHOL-TV (now KHGI-TV) in Kearney
- Former affiliations: CBS (1953–1961); DuMont (secondary, 1953–1955/56); NBC (secondary, 1954–1955); ABC (secondary, 1954–1961); Fox (secondary, 1994–c. 1999)

Links
- Website: nebraska.tv
- For technical information, see § Stations.

The Nebraska Television Network (NTV) is the ABC affiliate for most of central and western Nebraska. It consists of two full-power stations: KHGI-TV (channel 13) in Kearney, with its transmitter near Lowell; and KWNB-TV (channel 6) in Hayes Center—as well as two low-power stations in McCook and North Platte. NTV is owned by Sinclair Broadcast Group, alongside Lincoln-licensed Fox affiliate KFXL-TV (channel 51), and operates from studios on Nebraska Highway 44 east of Axtell, about 14 miles (23 km) south of Kearney, with a secondary studio and news bureau at the Conestoga Mall in Grand Island.

NTV serves North Platte as well as the western half of the Lincoln–Hastings–Kearney market, though it has never been the ABC affiliate of record for Lincoln. Historically, Lincoln viewers watched Omaha stations; in 1996, KLKN (channel 8) was launched as a Lincoln-based ABC affiliate. Though KLKN and NTV generally focus on separate areas, satellite television providers Dish Network and DirecTV provide both stations across the entire market.

The first station in the network went on the air as KHOL-TV in December 1953. Owned by a group of businessmen from Holdrege, it was a primary affiliate of CBS and the first station in Nebraska outside of Lincoln or Omaha. To bring television to southwestern Nebraska, local residents contributed money to construct channel 6 at Hayes Center, originally designated KHPL-TV, which began broadcasting in February 1956. The stations became primary ABC affiliates in 1961. In the 1960s, two additional transmitters were built: KHQL-TV (channel 8) at Albion and KHTL-TV (channel 4) in Superior. The network was sold to NTV Enterprises in 1974; the stations adopted their present call signs. In 1983, the Albion station was separated from the network as the short-lived independent station KBGT-TV "Big 8"; the translators in McCook and North Platte were constructed in the late 1980s.

In 1994, NTV began managing KTVG-TV in Grand Island, which became a Fox affiliate; KSNB-TV was switched from ABC to Fox in 1996. NTV's owner in the 1990s and 2000s, Pappas Telecasting, started Lincoln's channel 51 in 2006; that station and subchannels of most of the NTV stations became Fox affiliates in 2009. Sinclair acquired NTV at bankruptcy auction in 2015. The station produces news programs focusing on southwestern Nebraska and the Tri-Cities area.

== History ==
=== Early years ===
On March 20, 1953, the Bi-States Company, a group of businessmen from Holdrege and Alma, applied to the Federal Communications Commission (FCC) for permission to build channel 13 at Kearney, Nebraska. For several months, it appeared as though Bi-States would have to compete for the channel with the Central Nebraska Broadcasting Company, which owned Kearney radio station KGFW; however, when that company withdrew its bid in July, the FCC immediately granted a construction permit to Bi-States. The station, KHOL-TV, was built on a plot of land near Axtell; it signed for affiliation with CBS in September and the DuMont Television Network in October. Even though the station was licensed to Kearney, it was largely intended by its founding owners as a vehicle to promote Holdrege.

Construction was completed on December 24, 1953, when the transmitter was turned on and began broadcasting a test pattern. The next day, December 25, the first program was broadcast. In February 1954, 5,000 people turned out for an open house, cars lining the highway for miles with just as many having turned away due to long lines. In 1954, the station also added secondary affiliations with ABC and NBC; however, KHOL nearly lost CBS that same year before protests from viewers, who sent in tens of thousands of postcards, led the network to sign a two-year renewal of the station's affiliation. Channel 13 would lose NBC a year later in advance of the 1956 launch of KHAS-TV (channel 5), an NBC affiliate; to allow KHOL-TV to carry the 1955 World Series, community members started a fund drive to cover the expenses of arranging long lines service from Omaha to Axtell.

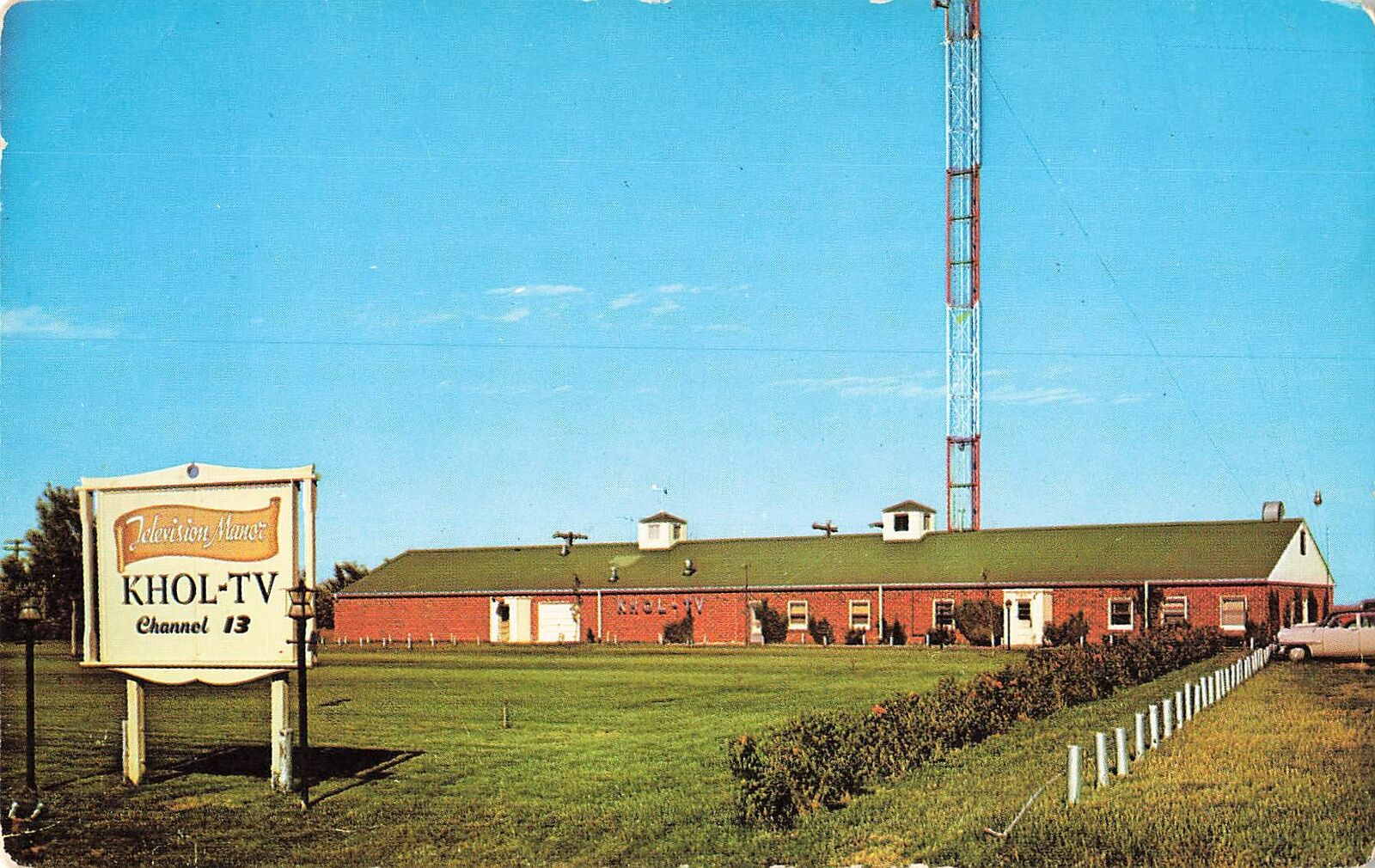
The KHOL-TV studios at Axtell, as seen in this mid-1960s postcard

In its early years, KHOL-TV featured extensive local programming; by July 1954, the station was producing 13 of its 24 weekday programs from the lone studio at the facility in Axtell, including a women's program, The Woman's Voice, and local news and sports coverage. Bob Stoltz, an early station employee, described the studio as a "cracker box" before it was tripled in size in 1955. Early popular shows included Saturday night studio wrestling and Friday night boxing; the wrestling program was discontinued after hostile combatants kicked a television monitor.

Bi-States applied in February 1955 to have channel 6 allotted at Hayes Center after local residents petitioned the station to extend its service area further west. The request was part of a plan by which residents in an 11-county area would contribute $245,000 for the establishment of the additional transmitter. In North Platte, radio station KODY held a nine-hour radiothon that raised more than $12,000 in donations to support the effort to bring a television signal to the region. Once the FCC assigned channel 6, Bi-States filed for and received the construction permit for KHPL-TV, which was built 8 miles (13 km) north of Hayes Center. Even though the local fundraising goal fell tens of thousands of dollars short, the additional transmitter went into program service on February 8, 1956. Other proposals—none of which materialized—would have seen Bi-States support the establishment of similar stations at Ainsworth, Alliance, and Sterling, Colorado.

Bi-States expanded into radio in June 1959 with the launch of KHOL-FM (98.9 FM, now KKPR-FM); in 1961, the company also purchased KRNY (1460 AM, now KXPN). KRNY was sold to Radio Kearney in 1964; the following year, the same company purchased KHOL-FM.

On February 2, 1961, KHOL-TV and KHPL-TV dropped CBS to become full ABC affiliates, eight months before KGIN-TV (channel 11) signed on from Grand Island in October as a satellite of Lincoln's CBS affiliate, KOLN-TV (channel 10). In 1962, the FCC permitted KHOL-TV to build a new tower near Lowell, which would be 1,163 feet (354 m) tall—the tallest structure in the state—and carry a maximum-power signal. Construction was completed in 1963.

The 1960s brought two more transmitters into the network. Bi-States petitioned the FCC in 1960 and 1961, respectively, to allot channel 4 to Superior, to the southeast, and channel 8 to Albion, a community to the northeast of the Tri-Cities. In November 1962, the FCC affirmed the assignment of both channels after educational television interests also sought channel 8. Formal applications were then made for Superior and Albion in November 1963, with construction permits issued in February 1964 for both stations. With the call sign KHQL-TV—matching KHOL-TV and its satellite KHPL-TV—the Albion station was constructed and began telecasting on December 3, 1964. KHTL-TV in Superior followed on October 1, 1965. The four stations began branding as the Nebraska Television Network (NTV).

In the late 1960s, KHOL-TV produced a local weekly variety show: The Bobby Mills Show, featuring the Bobby Mills Orchestra, similar to The Lawrence Welk Show. The program aired for 86 consecutive weeks from 1968 to 1970.

=== NTV ===
NTV Enterprises—a company owned by the Oldfather and Payne families of Kearney—acquired the NTV stations in 1974 for $1.9 million. On June 3, the new owners changed the call letters of all the stations: KHOL became KHGI-TV, KHPL became KWNB-TV, KHQL became KCNA-TV, and KHTL became KSNB-TV. The new call signs were chosen to reflect the areas served by each station; KHGI stands for "Kearney, Hastings, Grand Island", while KWNB refers to that station's service to western Nebraska.

After negotiations with Grit Publishing of Pennsylvania stalled, Joseph Amaturo bought the NTV stations in 1979 in an $8.5 million deal funded by the sale of KQTV in St. Joseph, Missouri. KCNA was split off from NTV on November 1, 1983, to become an independent station under the call sign KBGT-TV and known as Big 8. Amaturo Group sold KHGI-TV, KWNB-TV, and KSNB-TV to Gordon Broadcasting for $10 million in 1985; the sale separated the NTV stations from the money-losing KBGT-TV, which was separately sold a year later to Citadel Communications and became KCAN, a satellite of Sioux City, Iowa's KCAU-TV. Gordon passed on buying Big 8 because it was unsure if cable systems in Lincoln would continue to carry the station.

While NTV had lost one of its four high-power stations with the failed Big 8, Gordon Broadcasting tried to extend and improve the network's reach in the late 1980s. In January 1987, NTV attempted to enter Lincoln when it announced its intent to acquire a channel 45 construction permit held by Native American Communications Corporation. The permit had been awarded in April 1984 but never built; however, the deal fell apart when the FCC refused to grant additional time for channel 45 to be constructed. Later that year, Gordon applied for four new low-power facilities: channel 13 at North Platte, channel 21 in McCook, channel 17 in Beatrice, and channel 18 in Lincoln. Lincoln was of particular importance because, by 1993, 85,100 households lived in the "Metro 1" portion of the Arbitron-defined area of dominant influence, comprising Lancaster County, compared to 44,600 households in the "Metro 2" area of Adams, Buffalo, and Hall counties. The North Platte translator entered into service on October 10, 1989.

Gordon Broadcasting planned to sell the NTV stations to Sterling Communications for $11 million in 1989. However, the Sterling sale was unable to be completed, and in May, ownership reverted to Joseph Amaturo under a court-appointed receivership. The next month, Chicago-based Heller Financial sued Gordon Broadcasting; Gordon had borrowed $7 million from Heller to purchase the stations and still owed the entire principal and $1.6 million in interest on the loan. Joseph Girard was appointed successor receiver in 1991. During this time, NTV was put on the market; a bid by Pappas Telecasting in 1990 received court approval, but the company failed to obtain financing, while television meteorologist John Coleman later sought to purchase the stations. Under Girard, who operated NTV through Girard Communications, KHGI-TV, KWNB-TV, and KSNB-TV were sold to Fant Broadcasting, owner of WNAL-TV in Gadsden, Alabama, for $2 million in 1993. The Fant purchase took a year to come together because the receivership status required the company to buy NTV's assets on an individual basis.

=== Addition of Fox stations; sale to Pappas ===
On April 1, 1994, Fant took over the operations of Hill Broadcasting Company's KTVG-TV (channel 17), an upstart independent station in Grand Island, under a local marketing agreement (LMA), making it a sister station to the NTV stations. After the LMA was signed, NTV secured a primary Fox affiliation for KTVG-TV; as part of the deal, the NTV ABC stations took on a secondary Fox affiliation to carry the network's NFL coverage. Fant also activated the Lincoln translator—changed from channel 18 to 22—in 1994. The Lincoln translator attracted little interest locally, and NTV was not added on cable there.

In July 1995, Fant announced a deal to sell KHGI, KWNB, and KSNB to Blackstar, LLC, a minority-controlled company in which nonvoting equity interests were held by Fox Television Stations and Silver King Communications, for $13 million. Blackstar was a vehicle for acquiring stations in medium to small markets and switching them from their existing networks to Fox; the company stated its intent to switch the NTV stations to Fox if the deal was approved. However, the deal hit a snag for other reasons. Fant Broadcasting had applied for a newly allocated channel 18 at Albion. That allocation had been made because Citadel Communications was in the process of moving KCAN to Lincoln, where it would become a standalone ABC affiliate; a replacement TV station needed to be established at Albion if channel 8 was to be moved to Lincoln, and Citadel had also filed for that channel. (Note: This was resolved by also adding channel 24 to Albion. Citadel's channel 24 station operated as KLKE from 1996 to 2003.) When the Blackstar sale agreement was filed with the FCC, Citadel protested, feeling that Fant Broadcasting had attempted to block its Lincoln proposal by applying for Albion; company president Anthony Fant denied this, noting that his main goal for seeking the Albion channel was to restore the coverage lost a decade prior and "try to put that part of the NTV puzzle back together". Citadel's objection, as well as two federal government shutdowns, delayed FCC approval; Fant walked away from the deal in May 1996 because of continuing delays.

Coverage areas of the NTV stations; KHGI-TV; KWNB-DT; KHGI-CD; KWNB-LD

In July 1996, Fant agreed to sell KHGI-TV, KWNB-TV, and KSNB-TV to Pappas Telecasting Companies for $12.75 million. Pappas immediately assumed control of the NTV stations through a local marketing agreement that began on July 1 and, that September, switched KSNB, as well as the Lincoln and Beatrice translators, to rebroadcasting KTVG and Fox; KHGI and KWNB remained with ABC. In 1997, Pappas sold its right to acquire KSNB-TV and its translators to Colins Broadcasting Company for $10 (with Colins paying $333,333 to Fant), as channel 4's signal overlapped with Pappas's Omaha station, KPTM; Pappas also entered into an LMA with Colins to continue operating KSNB. The sales of KHGI and KWNB to Pappas and KSNB to Colins were approved by the FCC on February 17, 1999, and completed on May 24. In 2009 and 2010, KSNB-TV and KTVG-TV were supplanted by Pappas-operated KFXL-TV (channel 51) in Lincoln as the market's Fox affiliate when the other two stations closed.

KHGI-TV and KWNB-TV shut down their analog signals on February 17, 2009, the original target date on which full-power television stations in the United States were to transition from analog to digital broadcasts under federal mandate (which was later pushed back to June 12, 2009). Both stations relocated their digital signals from their pre-transition frequencies (KHGI-TV from UHF channel 36 to VHF channel 13, and KWNB-TV from UHF channel 18 to VHF channel 6, respectively).

NTV converted from analog to digital broadcasting in McCook in March 2010, when KWNB-LD, previously KUVR-LD, replaced what was the former KBVZ-LP on channel 42 as well as WCWH-LD, which rebroadcast Fox on channel 40. KUVR-LD had previously broadcast Fox only.

NTV's Grand Island news bureau moved to the Conestoga Mall in 2011; the new bureau featured a floor-to-ceiling window allowing mall shoppers to see news employees at work and live reports in progress. At the same time, the station considered moving its studios from Axtell to a site in Kearney to reduce travel from the rural location.

=== Sale to Sinclair ===
Pappas Telecasting filed for bankruptcy in May 2008. Seven years later, in August 2015, the liquidating trust for Pappas announced that it was soliciting bids for a bankruptcy auction of the company's central and western Nebraska stations—NTV and KFXL—which took place October 27, 2015. (Note: This left the liquidating trust to sell KCWI and KDMI in Des Moines, Iowa, and WLGA-TV in Opelika, Alabama.) Of the four companies that participated in the auction, Sinclair Broadcast Group emerged as the winning bidder; on November 4, 2015, the company announced that it had agreed to acquire the stations for $31.25 million. The sale was completed on May 1, 2016.

In 2021, KHGI-TV received FCC approval to convert to the UHF band on channel 18; the change was completed on June 29, 2023, after the removal of the original channel 13 antenna and the installation of a new antenna for the UHF channel.

== News operation ==
NTV's news established itself as the second-place news in the Kearney–Hastings–Grand Island portion of the market by 1989, behind KOLN/KGIN, though its news staff was half the size. The news department produced 6:30 a.m., noon, and 6 and 10 p.m. newscasts by 1995; the market's only 5 p.m. newscast debuted in 1997, though the station had previously aired a news program in that time slot in the 1980s.

As with its competition in the market, NTV has generally been characterized by long-tenured, homegrown news personalities. Bob Booe anchored the news in the late 1970s and then again from the early 1980s to 1992; upon his death in 2011, he was remembered as a reason people tuned in to the station's newscasts and for training young journalists. Bob Geiger was weather forecaster for the station from 1981 until he died of a heart attack in 2005; his replacement, Kent Boughton, remained with the station for more than 20 years.

Pappas brought additional resources to NTV during its ownership, particularly because it owned KPTM in Omaha. In 1998, when that station got a new set, the previous set was shipped to Axtell and reassembled at NTV's studios. In addition, Pappas included NTV in equipment purchases along with its news-producing stations in Omaha and Fresno, California. The station was number two in the market by 2002, despite not covering it in its entirety. In May 2013, NTV added a weekly agricultural news program, called NTV's Grow, which was the station's first regular broadcast in high definition.

A 2016 incident in which an NTV crew unwittingly filmed potential jurors for a murder trial in Kansas led to the judge declaring a mistrial; in an apology, NTV's news director cited differences with courtroom filming practices in Nebraska and Kansas. In March 2018, a producer for NTV's morning newscast resigned, citing what he called Sinclair's "obvious bias" and requirements that stations include conservative-leaning national news packages in their newscasts. The resignation came after the company required its stations to produce and air local promotions, with local anchors reading a script provided by the corporate office.

In November 2024, Sinclair converted NTV to an anchorless format, with stories directly introduced by reporters. This led to the departures of anchors Colleen Williams and Dave Griek as well as Boughton.

=== Former on-air staff ===
- Rick Benjamin – news anchor, 1986–1988
- Marg Helgenberger – weekend weather anchor, 1980 (Note: Helgenberger was known on air as Margi McCarty, using her grandmother's maiden name. This was because of the surnames of her co-anchors, Eisenminger and Knocklinger; a producer felt Helgenberger too long opposite those names.)
- Howard Morgan – weather forecaster, 1950s
- Linda Vester – reporter, late 1980s

== Stations ==
Nebraska Television Network stations
Station	City of license	Channel	FID	ERP	HAAT	Transmitter coordinates	Start date (Note: First day of programming, though most sources list the first day as the day the transmitter was turned on. For KHGI-TV, this was December 24, 1953. For KWNB-TV, this was February 8, 1956.)	Former call signs	Public license information
KHGI-TV	Kearney	18, virtual 13	21160	1,000 kW	338 m (1,109 ft)	40°39′27.9″N 98°52′5″W	December 25, 1953	KHOL-TV (1953–1974)	Public file; LMS
KWNB-TV	Hayes Center	6	21162	11.9 kW	221 m (725 ft)	40°37′32″N 101°1′47″W	February 8, 1956	KHPL-TV (1956–1974) (Note: The construction permit bore the call sign KHOK-TV from September 21 to October 7, 1955.)	Public file; LMS
KWNB-LD	McCook	29	126405	4.7 kW	92 m (302 ft)	40°12′52.0″N 100°39′51″W	June 22, 2004 (Note: Split license history, separate from KBVZ-LP (channel 42), in service until March 19, 2010.)	K29GG (2004–2005); KNNC-LP (2005); KUVR-LP (2005–2007); KUVR-LD (2007–2009)	LMS
KHGI-CD	North Platte	27	168339	15 kW	143 m (469 ft)	41°13′22.0″N 100°41′17″W	October 10, 1989 (Note: Split license history. The original K13VO, later KHGI-CA, was facility ID 21163. It closed in 2011.)	WSWS-LD (2007–2009); KHGI-LD (2009–2011)	Public file; LMS

In 2021, NTV shut down a fifth transmitter, KHGI-LD in O'Neill.

== Subchannels ==
The stations' signals are multiplexed:

Subchannels of KHGI-TV, KWNB-TV, and KWNB-LD
Subchannel			Res.	Short name			Programming
KHGI-TV	KWNB-TV	KWNB-LD	Res.	KHGI-TV	KWNB-TV	KWNB-LD	Programming
13.1	6.1	29.1	720p	KHGI-DT	KWNB-DT	KWNB-LD	ABC
13.2	6.2	29.2	720p	KFXL-DT			Fox (KFXL-TV)
13.3	6.3	29.3	480i	ROAR			Roar
13.4	6.4	29.4	480i	Charge!			Charge!

Simulcast of subchannels of another station

Unlike the other three stations, KHGI-CD does not carry a Fox subchannel. The Fox affiliate in North Platte is KIIT-CD.

Subchannels of KHGI-CD
Subchannel	Res.	Short name	Programming
27.1	720p	ABC	ABC
27.2	480i	ROAR	Roar
27.3	480i	Charge!	Charge!
