= KTVG-TV =

Television station in Grand Island, Nebraska (1993–2010)

- Grand Island, Nebraska; United States
- Channels: Digital: 19 (UHF); Virtual: 17
- Branding: KFXL, Fox Nebraska

Programming
- Affiliations: Independent (1993–1994); Fox (1994–2010); UPN (secondary, 1995–1998 and 2000–2005)

Ownership
- Owner: Hill Broadcasting Company, Inc.
- Operator: Pappas Telecasting Companies
- Sister stations: Nebraska Television Network, KFXL-TV

History
- First air date: April 2, 1993
- Last air date: April 5, 2010
- Former channel numbers: Analog: 17 (UHF, 1993–2009); Digital: 19 (UHF, 2000–2010)
- Call sign meaning: "Television Grand Island"

Technical information
- Licensing authority: FCC
- Facility ID: 27220
- ERP: 1,000 kW
- HAAT: 186 m (610 ft)
- Transmitter coordinates: 40°43′44″N 98°34′13″W

Links
- Public license information: Public file; LMS

KTVG-TV (channel 17) was a television station in Grand Island, Nebraska, United States, which broadcast from 1993 to 2010. It was affiliated for most of its history with Fox, broadcasting the network to the Tri-Cities area of the state. From 1996 to 2009, it was paired with KSNB-TV (channel 4) in Superior as "Fox 4 & 17".

KTVG-TV began broadcasting in 1993 as an independent station. The next year, operations were taken over by Fant Broadcasting, owner of the Nebraska Television Network (NTV), at which time KTVG joined Fox, while the NTV network also broadcast Fox NFL football games. When NTV was sold to Pappas Telecasting in 1996, KSNB-TV was switched from ABC to Fox.

In 2009, Pappas converted KCWL-TV in Lincoln, an affiliate of The CW, to Fox as KFXL-TV "Fox Nebraska". The local marketing agreements that allowed Pappas to program KSNB-TV and KTVG-TV were allowed to lapse in November 2009 and April 2010, respectively. KTVG-TV shut down on April 5, 2010, and never returned to the air.

== History ==
=== Establishment ===
Family Broadcasting Company of Fairfield, Iowa, applied in June 1984 for a construction permit to build channel 17 in Grand Island. The construction permit was granted by the Federal Communications Commission (FCC) on February 27, 1986. By 1989, Jerry Montgomery, the owner of Family Broadcasting, intended for the station to be an affiliate of Fox and hoped it would carry Kansas City Royals baseball. Family also held construction permits in Joplin, Missouri, and Cedar Rapids, Iowa. Montgomery's efforts to put KTVG-TV on the air were frustrated by issues securing a location for the transmitter facility, though by late 1989, he had secured a site on the Hall-Adams county line. The station was still unbuilt in 1992, when Family Broadcasting applied to transfer the construction permit to KafCom, a business owned by the Kafka family. The KafCom acquisition never materialized, leaving Montgomery to build KTVG himself.

KTVG-TV quietly debuted in late March or early April 1993. During the soft launch, the station broadcast for eight hours each weekday with no recording capability; every single program aired had to be carried live from a satellite feed until appropriate equipment was installed. Financial assistance for the construction of the new station had been provided by Robert Hill, a staff member at WNAL-TV in Gadsden, Alabama, who then bought the station under the name Hill Broadcasting in May. Hill had learned about KTVG from WNAL-TV's owner, Anthony J. Fant. Fant was in the middle of purchasing the Nebraska Television Network (NTV), the region's ABC affiliate. George Singleton, whom Fant had intended to become general manager of NTV once the sale was finalized, had already relocated to Grand Island. In July 1993, just as the FCC approved the sale, KTVG sustained flood damage at its site on Engleman Road and was out of service until September, as equipment had to be removed and reassembled; Singleton served as KTVG's temporary general manager and was later replaced by a WNAL-TV employee.

=== Fox affiliation ===
Once the flood damage was repaired, KTVG rapidly upgraded its programming and facilities. In December 1993, the station signed a contract to carry Royals baseball games in 1994; two months later, Hill announced plans to rebuild the station with more power and tower height to allow it to cover Hastings and Kearney in addition to Grand Island. By this time, KTVG broadcast from 7 a.m. to midnight. On April 1, 1994, NTV took over the operations of KTVG under a local marketing agreement (LMA). After the LMA was signed, KTVG then became an affiliate of the Fox network, a deal that also allowed the NTV ABC stations to carry the new NFL on Fox football package. When UPN began in January 1995, KTVG became a secondary affiliate of the new network. For several years thereafter, KTVG carried live simulcasts of NTV's newscasts.

Pappas Telecasting took over KTVG's operations on July 1, 1996, after it agreed to purchase NTV from Fant and immediately assumed control under an LMA; that September, Pappas converted KSNB-TV—as well as its translators in Beatrice and Lincoln—from a satellite of KHGI to a satellite of KTVG, expanding the availability of Fox programming in central Nebraska. The combined service was known as "Fox 4 & 17". Pappas also built a new tower for the station near Wood River; the improved facility, activated in January 1999, extended KTVG-TV's coverage area in time for Super Bowl XXXIII and was intended as a temporary site until a planned 2,000-foot (610 m) tower at Ravenna was completed.

KTVG and KSNB-TV dropped the secondary UPN affiliation in January 1998; however, the network's programming returned to the stations in 2000. This was noteworthy, because Time Warner Cable, which ran the cable system in Lincoln, added KSNB to its lineup in early 2003 expressly because of its carriage of select UPN programs. UPN programming was removed again in September 2005, when KOLN and KGIN launched a UPN-affiliated subchannel.

KSNB and KTVG began broadcasting network programming in high definition on January 1, 2009, prior to the broadcast of the Orange Bowl. On June 12, 2009, Pappas converted KCWL-TV, an affiliate of The CW it managed in Lincoln, to Fox Nebraska as KFXL-TV. This fulfilled an ambition of Pappas that dated to the late 1990s. Additionally, Fox Nebraska was added to subchannels of the NTV stations at Kearney and Hayes Center—KHGI-TV and KWNB-TV. This came months after a web page briefly indicated that the Fox affiliation would move to subchannels of KOLN and KGIN, a page labeled by a station official as a "leftover piece of an experimental project".

=== Replacement and closure ===
With Fox network coverage shifted to KFXL and the NTV transmitters, the operations agreements Pappas held to run KSNB-TV and KTVG-TV were allowed to expire. The time brokerage agreement between Pappas Telecasting and Colins Broadcasting Corporation, owner of KSNB-TV, expired on November 30, 2009; that station, along with two translator stations in Lincoln owned by Colins, shut down on December 1. KSNB subsequently broadcast intermittently as an affiliate of the Three Angels Broadcasting Network; in 2012, it was acquired by Gray Television, the owner of KOLN/KGIN.

KTVG-TV ceased broadcasting on April 5, 2010. In 2011, Hill Broadcasting was granted special temporary authority to continue operating its pre-transition channel 19 digital facility while it completed construction on a post-transition facility on channel 16. The expiration of that permit had been tolled by the FCC Media Bureau while Pappas was in bankruptcy proceedings, an action the commission later found to be in error. In 2012, the bankruptcy proceeding was terminated, and the post-transition permit expired. Furthermore, the station had been off the air for over a year (Note: Under Section 312(g) of the Communications Act of 1934, as amended, a broadcast station's license automatically expires if it has not broadcast for 12 consecutive months.) and failed to file an application for renewal of its broadcast license by February 1, 2014. As a result, the FCC canceled the license in a letter dated April 22, 2014. Hill Broadcasting contested the action and filed a license renewal on May 30, 2014, which the FCC dismissed as untimely; the commission also ruled that the off-air period had already resulted in the station's license expiring. In 2015, the commission dismissed an application for review of the decision by Hill as late-filed.

== Repeaters ==
By 2009, Fox Nebraska was seen over six low-power repeaters, all of which were located on the UHF band. K17CI, relaying KSNB-TV, shut down upon the digital television transition for full-power stations on June 12, 2009, and the Lincoln transmitters, owned by Colins, closed on November 30 when KSNB-TV left the air. The remaining transmitters, as well as KFXL in its early months on air, were fed directly from the KTVG-TV transmitter.

- Beatrice: K17CI
- Lincoln: K18CD, KWAZ-LP 35
- McCook: KUVR-LD 29, WCWH-LP 40 (Note: On March 19, 2010, NTV ceased analog broadcasting in McCook. KUVR-LD, now KWNB-LD, remained in service as the digital transmitter for both services.)
- O'Neill: KOAZ-LP 48
