= CW 51 =

CW 51 may refer to the following television stations in the U.S. affiliated with The CW:

== Current ==
=== Owned-and-operated station ===
- KUSI-TV in San Diego, California

=== Affiliates ===
- KUNS-TV in Bellevue–Seattle, Washington
- WPXT in Portland, Maine

== Former ==
- KCWL-TV (now KFXL-TV) in Lincoln, Nebraska (2006–2009)
