= KCWL =

KCWL may refer to:

- KCWL-LD, a low-power television station (channel 24, virtual 40) licensed to serve Monroe, Louisiana, United States
- KCWL-LP, a defunct low-power television station (channel 57) formerly licensed to serve Storm Lake, Iowa, United States
- KFXL-TV, a television station (channel 51) licensed to serve Lincoln, Nebraska, United States, which held the call sign KCWL-TV from 2006 to 2009
