= KFXL =

KFXL may refer to:

- KFXL-TV, a television station (channel 15, virtual 51) licensed to Lincoln, Nebraska, United States
- KFXL-LP, a television station (channel 30) licensed to Lufkin, Texas, United States
