= KMTV-TV =

Television station in Omaha, Nebraska

- Omaha, Nebraska; Council Bluffs, Iowa; United States
- City: Omaha, Nebraska
- Channels: Digital: 31 (UHF); Virtual: 3
- Branding: KMTV 3; KMTV 3 News Now

Programming
- Affiliations: 3.1: CBS; for others, see § Subchannels

Ownership
- Owner: E. W. Scripps Company; (Scripps Broadcasting Holdings LLC)

History
- First air date: September 1, 1949
- Former call signs: KMTV (1949–2009)
- Former channel numbers: Analog: 3 (VHF, 1949–2009); Digital: 45 (UHF, 2003–2019)
- Former affiliations: CBS (1949–1956); ABC (secondary, 1949–1953 and 1954–1957); DuMont (secondary, 1949–1955); NBC (1956–1986); United (secondary, 1967)
- Call sign meaning: May Television (original licensee)

Technical information
- Licensing authority: FCC
- Facility ID: 35190
- ERP: 652 kW
- HAAT: 411.1 m (1,349 ft)
- Transmitter coordinates: 41°18′24.6″N 96°1′37.7″W

Links
- Public license information: Public file; LMS
- Website: www.3newsnow.com

KMTV-TV (channel 3) is a television station in Omaha, Nebraska, United States, affiliated with CBS. Owned by the E. W. Scripps Company, the station has studios on Mockingbird Drive in southwest Omaha, and its transmitter is located on a "tower farm" near North 72nd Street and Crown Point Avenue in north-central Omaha. It also doubles as a secondary CBS station in the Platte Purchase area (northern portions of the St. Joseph, Missouri, television market) alongside local affiliate KCJO-LD.

== History ==
KMTV began broadcasting on September 1, 1949, as the second oldest television station in Nebraska. It operated as a CBS affiliate, but carried secondary affiliations with ABC and the DuMont Television Network. The station's call letters were originally intended to be KMA-TV, reflecting its first owner, Shenandoah, Iowa–based May Broadcasting, which owned KMA (960 AM) in that community. However, this violated Federal Communications Commission (FCC) rules, which at the time required stations have the same or adjacent city of license in order to share a base call sign. The station originally operated from studios located at 2615 Farnam Street in downtown Omaha, seven blocks east of WOW-TV (channel 6, now WOWT, at 3501 Farnam).

KMTV briefly dropped ABC programming when KFOR-TV signed on from Lincoln in 1953. The network returned to KMTV when the FCC separated Lincoln to form its own market a year later. In 1955, KMTV is the first television station in Omaha to broadcast color programming. In 1956, KMTV switched affiliations with WOW-TV and became an NBC affiliate. This was part of CBS' multi-year, five-station affiliation deal with Meredith Corporation, as a compensation for Phoenix sister station KPHO to lose affiliation with network (KCMO-AM-FM-TV also switched to the network several months earlier). It also lost DuMont programming that same year when that network ceased operations. In September 1957, KMTV dropped its secondary ABC affiliation when KETV signed on as an exclusive affiliate of the network, from studios on Douglas Street just north of channel 3's facility. A sister station agreement with TV Shizuoka from Japan was signed in 1974.

In 1978, KMTV relocated to its current studio facilities near 108th and Mockingbird Drive; the station's auxiliary transmitter remains at the station's former studio location. In 1986, KMTV and WOWT entered into an agreement which allowed them to return to their original affiliations; as a result, KMTV rejoined CBS after 30 years with NBC on June 29, 1986. A few months after returning to CBS, May sold both of its television stations—KMTV and KGUN-TV in Tucson, Arizona—to Lee Enterprises after over 37 years of ownership. Lee sold its entire broadcasting division, including KMTV, to Emmis Communications in October 2000. In 2005, Emmis announced its exit from television station ownership to concentrate on its radio station properties, selling most non-license assets of KMTV as well as outright ownership of KGUN to the Journal Broadcast Group. The sale closed in late December of that year. At that point, Journal took over control of KMTV through a time brokerage agreement.

In late January 2007, Journal announced the sale of radio station KOMJ (1490 AM) to Cochise Broadcasting LLC, in order to purchase KMTV outright. The sale of KOMJ was necessary because Journal already owned the maximum number of broadcasting properties in the Omaha media market as designated by the FCC. The transactions were completed on March 27, 2007.

Former logo used 2006 to 2017.

As of July 2013 within a month-long dispute between Journal and Time Warner Cable, KMTV was removed from the Time Warner system in Lincoln and replaced by GSN, and KOLN was solidified as the only CBS affiliate on that system.

On July 30, 2014, it was announced that The E. W. Scripps Company would acquire Journal Communications in an all-stock transaction. The combined firm will retain their broadcast properties, including KMTV, and spin off their print assets as Journal Media Group. The FCC approved the deal on December 12, 2014. It was approved by shareholders on March 11, 2015. The merger was completed on April 1, 2015.

== Programming ==
KMTV formerly served as the Omaha "Love Network" affiliate of the MDA Labor Day Telethon, until the organization's 2013 move from a syndicated broadcast to a network telecast on ABC (via KETV).

Jeopardy! and Wheel of Fortune both formerly ran on KMTV, which respectively carried the game shows at 4:30 and 6:30 p.m. weekdays until Jeopardy! moved to WOWT and Wheel moved to KETV, both in September 1994 (Jeopardy! initially ran on KETV from 1984 to 1986, when it moved to KMTV; it began airing Wheel in January 1984). Live! with Kelly also aired on KMTV (as far back as the Regis and Kathie Lee era) until 2012, when the show moved to Fox affiliate KPTM.

The station also ran a long-running children's religious show that debuted in 1961 called Ms. Jean's Storytime, which ended in September 2011 after a 50-year run.

In August 2012, the station began carrying Green Bay Packers preseason football games, as part the team's "official broadcaster" deal with Journal, which in addition to owning KMTV and WTMJ, also owns Green Bay's WGBA-TV, a deal which continues under Scripps ownership.

=== News operation ===
KMTV presently broadcasts 29 hours of locally produced newscasts each week (with five hours each weekday and two hours each on Saturdays and Sundays). For most of the time since the early 1960s, KMTV has been the third rated station in the Omaha market.

Over the years, KMTV underwent many identity changes to keep up with broadcasting trends, as well to keep up in the local ratings race. The station's newscasts were once known as KMTV News; NewsCenter 3; Channel 3 News; KMTV News 3; KM3 News; and most recently as Action 3 News; today, the station's newscasts are known as 3 News Now. Former NBC News anchor Tom Brokaw worked at the station as a reporter from 1962 to 1965.

In 2002, KMTV discontinued its 6 p.m. newscast and replaced it with syndicated tabloid programs. That same year, sports segments were dropped from the 10 p.m. newscast, and were replaced with a nightly commentary segment called "For What It's Worth" that was presented by then-sports director Travis Justice. In late 2005, KMTV discontinued "For What It's Worth", returning to the traditional sports segment.

KMTV returned a newscast to the 6 p.m. timeslot on September 5, 2006, coinciding with Katie Couric's debut as anchor of the CBS Evening News. The station has also taken on the glossy imaging and graphics packages seen on most other Journal stations, though with differing fonts and colors. On December 22, 2006, the station announced it would not be renewing the contracts of evening news anchors Deborah Ward and Greg Peterson; the two were replaced by Carol Wang and Carlo Cecchetto on January 22, 2007.

On July 11, 2009, KMTV became the first commercial television station in Omaha, and the second commercial station in the state of Nebraska (after KOLN and PBS member station NET, both in Lincoln) to begin broadcasting its local newscasts in 16:9 widescreen standard definition. In October 2013, KMTV became the third commercial station in Omaha (after WOWT and KPTM) to broadcast its newscasts in high definition.

In late 2013 and early 2014, KMTV added one and one-half hours worth of new news programming. On July 15, 2013, KMTV announced that it would launch a weekday half-hour 4 p.m. newscast; the program made its debut September 23, 2013, the newscast was then expanded to an hour. In January 2014 KMTV began broadcasting an early morning show focused on weather. Early Riser runs from 4:30 a.m. to 5 a.m. and features Ryan McPike covering the weather for the upcoming day. The station's 4 p.m. newscast became Upfront at 4 with the 2015–16 season, its first full season under Scripps ownership.

On March 8, 2017, KMTV introduced a new virtual set and re-branded its newscasts as 3 News Now. The station also switched to the standard Scripps graphics package and Stephen Arnold's "Inergy" music package to match other Scripps sister stations.

In January 2019, KMTV slashed at least half of its newscast schedule. The noon newscast was dropped to make way for Right This Minute, one of Scripps' original co-productions; the hour-long 4 p.m. newscast was also dropped to make way for The List and Entertainment Tonight; the 5 p.m. newscast became a mix of local and national stories and was renamed The NOW Omaha; the weeknight 6 p.m. newscast was expanded to a full hour; and the early-evening weekend half-hour newscasts on Saturdays at 6 p.m. and on Sundays at 5:30 p.m. were discontinued in favor of syndicated programming. As of May 2020, a traditional newscast has returned to the weekday 5 p.m. slot and the half-hour noon newscast has been reinstated.

=== Notable former on-air staff ===
- Tom Brokaw – reporter (1962–1965)
- Dick Fletcher – meteorologist (late 1970s)
- Bill Fries - commercials (1950–1960)
- Dale Hansen – sports reporter (1970s)
- Mary Hart – anchor (mid-1970s)
- Floyd Kalber – anchor (1950–1960)
- Jon Kelley – reporter (1990–1991)
- Chuck Roberts – anchor (1975–1981)

== Technical information ==
=== Subchannels ===
The station's signal is multiplexed:

Subchannels of KMTV-TV
Subchannel	Res.	Short name	Programming
3.1	1080i	KMTV-TV	CBS
3.2	720p	GRIT	Grit
3.3	480i	LAFF-TV	Laff
3.4	480i	Mystery	Ion Mystery
3.5	480i	COURTTV	Court TV
15.2	480i	TheNest	The Nest (KXVO)

Broadcast on behalf of another station

KMTV was the last television station in the market to begin carrying a digital subchannel; digital subchannel 3.2 was originally affiliated with TheCoolTV starting in late 2010 or early 2011, but dropped the network on October 1, 2011, in favor of Live Well Network as part of a compensation dispute between Journal Broadcast Group and TheCoolTV's parent company Cool Music Network, LLC. In turn, Antenna TV took LWN's place on December 29, 2014.

In late 2021, Grit and Court TV switched places at 3.2 and 3.5.

=== Analog-to-digital conversion ===
KMTV shut down its analog signal, over VHF channel 3, on June 12, 2009, as part of the federally mandated transition from analog to digital television. The station's digital signal remained on its pre-transition UHF channel 45, using virtual channel 3. Although KMTV never had a "-TV" suffix affixed to its call sign from the beginning, nor required one, it, along with all other previously un-suffixed Journal stations, officially had them applied to their callsign on June 19.
