= KXVO =

Television station in Omaha, Nebraska

ATSC 3.0 station
- Omaha, Nebraska; Council Bluffs, Iowa; United States
- City: Omaha, Nebraska
- Channels: Digital: 29 (UHF); Virtual: 15

Programming
- Affiliations: 15.1: Roar; 15.2: The Nest; 15.3: Charge!

Ownership
- Owner: Sinclair Broadcast Group; (KPTM Licensee, LLC)
- Sister stations: KPTM

History
- Founded: July 21, 1994
- First air date: June 10, 1995
- Former call signs: KPQC (July 21 – November 17, 1994)
- Former channel numbers: Analog: 15 (UHF, 1995–2009); Digital: 38 (UHF, 2002–2019)
- Former affiliations: The WB (1995–2006); FoxBox/4KidsTV (secondary, 2002–2008); The CW (2006–2021)
- Call sign meaning: "XV" is 15 in Roman numerals; Omaha

Technical information
- Licensing authority: FCC
- Facility ID: 23277
- ERP: 630 kW
- HAAT: 475 m (1,558 ft)
- Transmitter coordinates: 41°4′15.9″N 96°13′32.3″W

Links
- Public license information: Public file; LMS

KXVO (channel 15) is a television station in Omaha, Nebraska, United States, airing programming from the digital multicast network Roar. It is owned and operated by Sinclair Broadcast Group alongside dual Fox/CW affiliate KPTM (channel 42). The two stations share studios on Farnam Street in Omaha; KXVO's transmitter is located on Pflug Road, south of Gretna and I-80.

== History ==
KXVO signed on the air on June 10, 1995, as an affiliate of The WB, which debuted nationally almost five months earlier on January 11 of that year; the station was originally owned by Cocola Broadcasting, but was operated by Pappas Telecasting under a local marketing agreement. In the interim six months, Omaha did have access to The WB via cable and satellite providers through Chicago-based national superstation WGN. Cocola would later sell the station to Mitts Telecasting Company in 2000, which retained the LMA with Pappas.

On January 24, 2006, CBS Corporation and Time Warner announced that The WB and UPN would cease broadcasting that September and merge their programming to form a new "fifth" network called The CW. The letters represent the first initials of its corporate parents, CBS (the parent company of UPN) and the Warner Bros. Entertainment unit of Time Warner. In April 2006, KXVO announced an affiliation agreement with The CW, which began airing on the station when the network launched on September 18 of that year.

On January 16, 2009, it was announced that several Pappas stations, including sister station KPTM, would be sold to New World TV Group, after the sale received United States bankruptcy court approval. The LMA between KXVO and KPTM continued after the deal was finalized.

Titan TV Broadcast Group announced the sale of most of its stations, including KPTM and the LMA with KXVO (which remained under Mitts Telecasting ownership after the sale), to the Sinclair Broadcast Group on June 3, 2013. Sinclair announced the closing of the sale on October 3.

From 2009 until 2018, KXVO also served the state capital, Lincoln, located 52 miles (84 km) from Omaha, with broadcast and cable coverage even though Lincoln is located in a different market. It had been carried on cable in the eastern portion of the Lincoln–Hastings–Kearney market since its inception, even after Lincoln received its own WB/CW affiliate, KCWL-TV (which carried the WB 100+ and CW Plus services), and remained on most Lincoln cable systems in lieu of the national CW Plus feed (which was carried in the western portion of the market) after KCWL became Fox affiliate KFXL-TV. In October 2018, after Gray Television-owned KCWH-LD in Lincoln (through The CW Plus) took over that market's CW affiliation, KXVO was dropped from Lincoln's Spectrum system, with KCWH replacing it on channel 15.

On March 29, 2022, KXVO filed to begin broadcasting in ATSC 3.0. The existing subchannels are planned to be moved to KPTM, KMTV, and KETV to provide coverage for current ATSC 1.0 receivers pending agreements with Scripps and Hearst respectively for KMTV and KETV.

On November 21, 2025, Sinclair announced that it would acquire KXVO outright, creating a legal duopoly with KPTM. The sale was completed on December 4.

== Newscasts ==
The station was originally branded "All Entertainment, All the Time", and news was a low priority as KPTM built out its news department for their own station. In the late 1990s and early 2000s, KXVO aired 60-second "news updates" from KPTM during the 6 p.m. hour that promoted the latter's 9 o'clock newscast. In 2001, KXVO had begun to plan to carry a 5:30 p.m. newscast from KPTM to compete with the national newscasts. After the terrorist attacks of September 11, 2001, and the resulting economic downturn, those plans were put on hold and eventually abandoned. In the days following the attacks, though, KXVO aired continuous news coverage from CNN Headline News.

In December 2005, the station debuted a half-hour 10 p.m. newscast called The KXVO 15 10 O'Clock News, which was produced by KPTM (this time competing with Omaha's Big Three stations); that April, former MTV VJ and reality show host Brian McFayden was hired to anchor the program, only to leave the show for Current TV a few months later. In late August 2006, comedian and Second City Training Center alumnus Matt Geiler was tapped to anchor The KXVO 15 10 O'Clock News, which by that time would become a hybrid of news content (provided by the KPTM staff) and sketch/improv comedy. One prime example of this era occurred on the Halloween 2006 edition, when Geiler, for a pre-taped end-of-show segment, donned a black unitard and foam jack-o'-lantern and danced in front of a green screen image of a cemetery. Though The KXVO 15 10 O'Clock News was canceled in April 2007, the "Pumpkin Dance" has had a lasting life as a seasonal viral video and meme thanks to its uploading to YouTube by a KXVO producer after its original airing and the video's subsequent discovery later in the decade by BuzzFeed, Huffington Post, and other websites. The video went viral and became the subject to many internet memes across social media especially when it was paired with the Living Tombstone remix of "Spooky, Scary Skeletons" following the latter's popularity.

== Technical information ==
=== Subchannels ===
The station's ATSC 1.0 channels are carried on the multiplexed signals of other Omaha television stations:

Subchannels provided by KXVO (ATSC 1.0)
| Subchannel | Res. | Short name | Programming | ATSC 1.0 host |
|---|---|---|---|---|
| 15.1 | 480i | ROAR | Roar | KPTM |
| 15.2 | 480i | TheNest | The Nest | KMTV-TV |
| 15.3 | 480i | Charge! | Charge! | KETV |
| 42.10 | 480i | T2 | T2 | KPTM |
| 42.11 | 480i | PBTV | Pickleballtv | KPTM |

In October 2008, KAZO-LP dropped TuVision and became dark; Azteca América programming moved to KXVO 15.2 in Omaha and KMEG 14.2 in Sioux City, Iowa. Around this time, analog transmissions on KAZO-LP temporarily ceased, though the analog channel 57 signal was again seen on the air in October 2009. KAZO-LP shut down permanently later in fall 2009 and was no longer listed on KXVO-DT2 station IDs. By spring 2010, KMEG-DT2 had been spun off from KXVO-DT2 to have its own local feed in the Sioux City area. KXVO-DT2 is carried on DirecTV's local station package in the Omaha area as KAZO 57. Dish Network does not carry the station. Cox had previously carried KAZO-LP on analog channel 68, but dropped it in 2007 when the station became a TuVision affiliate, and did not restore the local signal when it switched back to Azteca América in 2008. Until the addition of Estrella TV on KPTM-DT3 in June 2010, Azteca América was the only Spanish-language network available over-the-air in Omaha. Sometime in late 2013 or early 2014, Azteca was dropped in favor of This TV.

In 2017, the KXVO subchannel lineup all changed. Sinclair's TBD replaced This TV on 15.2. Sinclair's action channel Charge! replaced Grit on 15.3. On September 6 of that year, 15.4 began broadcasting with Stadium.

On September 14, 2021, the TBD affiliation moved to the main channel, replacing The CW (which move its affiliation to KPTM-DT3 on that day). On that day, the Stadium affiliation moved to DT2, and DT4 went dark.

=== ATSC 3.0 lighthouse ===
Subchannels of KXVO (ATSC 3.0)
| Subchannel | Res. | Short name | Programming |
|---|---|---|---|
| 3.1 | 1080p | KMTV | CBS (KMTV-TV) |
| 6.1 | 1080p | WOWT | NBC (WOWT) |
| 7.1 | 1080p | KETV | ABC (KETV) |
| 15.1 | 1080p | KXVO | Roar |
| 26.1 | | NE-PBS | PBS (KYNE-TV) |
| 42.1 | 720p | KPTM | Fox (KPTM) |
| 42.10 | 1080p | T2 | T2 |
| 42.11 | 1080p | PBTV | Pickleballtv |
| 42.20 | | GMLOOP | GameLoop |
| 42.21 | | ROXi | ROXi |

Subchannel broadcast with digital rights management
Subchannel streamed via the Internet

=== Analog-to-digital conversion ===
KXVO shut down its analog signal, over UHF channel 15, on June 12, 2009, as part of the federally mandated transition from analog to digital television. The station's digital signal remained on its pre-transition UHF channel 38, using virtual channel 15.
