= Howard Morgan (weather forecaster) =

American weather forecaster (1930–2021)

Howard Winfield Morgan Jr. (May 1, 1930 – July 22, 2021) was a weather forecaster for Albuquerque, New Mexico television station KOAT-TV, Holdrege, Nebraska station KHOL-TV, and other stations in Kansas and Utah. He was known as "Uncle Howdy" during children's programming in all four states.

== Formative years ==
Morgan was born in Baumstown, Pennsylvania on May 1, 1930.

== Career ==
Morgan started his career as a graphic artist at KHOL-TV, and in 1953, became a weather forecaster there.

Morgan first drew "Thermo," his trademark drawing of the Sun with eyes and a smile, on his second day of weather forecasts at KHOL. He used Thermo for most of his weather forecasts until greenscreens and computer graphics became the norm for weather broadcasts.

In the mid 1950s, he moved to Albuquerque, New Mexico to work at KOAT. He briefly took a job in Utah in the late 1960s, but returned to KOAT in 1971.

While at KOAT, Morgan did a regular series of reports called "Gardenlore."

He retired from KOAT in November 1999 after a 46-year career. In later life, he could still be seen in commercials as a spokesperson for an Albuquerque window manufacturer and also appeared in an ad for hearing aids.

== Death ==
Morgan died on July 22, 2021, at the age of 91.

== Books ==
Howard Morgan, based on Gardenlore, wrote three books:

- Howard Morgan's Gardenlore (1979), Library of Congress number (LCCN) 79083491
- Howard Morgan's More from Gardenlore (1981)
- Howard Morgan's Even More from Gardenlore (1981), LCCN 80085145

All three were published by KOAT.
