= Drew Anderson (outfielder) =

American baseball player (born 1981)

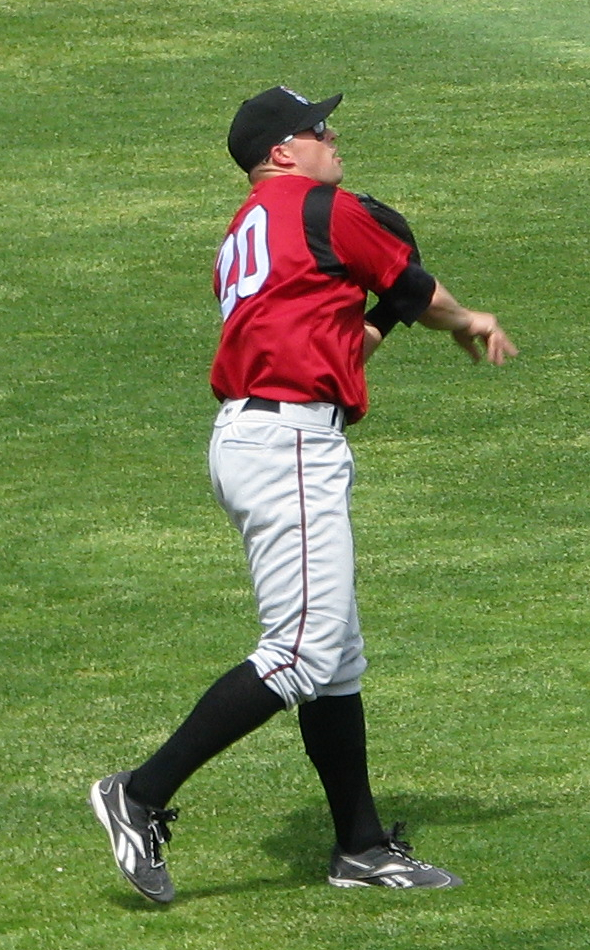
- Anderson playing for the Nashville Sounds in 2010
- Outfielder
- Born: June 9, 1981 (age 45); Kearney, Nebraska, U.S.
- Batted: Left Threw: Right

MLB debut
- September 11, 2006, for the Milwaukee Brewers

Last MLB appearance
- October 1, 2006, for the Milwaukee Brewers

MLB statistics
- Batting average: .111
- Home runs: 0
- Runs batted in: 0
- Stats at Baseball Reference

Teams
- Milwaukee Brewers (2006)

Drew Thomas Anderson (born June 8, 1981) is an American former professional baseball outfielder. Anderson was selected by the Milwaukee Brewers in the 24th round (699th overall) of the 2003 Major League Baseball draft, and made his major league debut for the Brewers in 2006. Anderson was selected off waivers by the Cincinnati Reds in 2008 and played in their minor league system until being released in 2009. He re-signed with the Brewers as a free agent before retiring from professional baseball and becoming a scout for the Brewers organization.

== Early life ==
Anderson attended Kearney High School in Kearney, Nebraska, playing American legion ball and batting .443 as a junior with 41 extra-base hits and 75 RBIs. He also earned first-team All-Nebraska honors from the Omaha World-Herald and Lincoln Journal Star in 1999 as a football receiver, hauling 38 passes for 818 yards and nine touchdowns, and further won all-class gold medals in both the 110 and 330-meter hurdles in track and field.

== Amateur career ==
In his freshman year at the University of Nebraska–Lincoln, Anderson appeared in 27 games for the Nebraska Cornhuskers and batted .293/.370/.366 with nine stolen bases. He made one postseason appearance for the team as a pinch runner, tying Nebraska's game against the Rice University Owls in the 2011 NCAA Division I Lincoln Super Regional, which Nebraska would go on to win in extra innings.

As a sophomore, Anderson batted .266/.378/.319 with one home run and 32 RBIs in 63 appearances, though his postseason batting average dropped to .077 in 13 at bats. He played in 57 of Nebraska's 62 games as a junior in 2003, hitting .238 with 19 RBI, 17 runs scored and seven stolen bases.

== Professional career ==
=== 2003–2005: Minor league debut ===
Upon being drafted by the Milwaukee Brewers in 2003, Anderson made his minor league debut with the Helena Brewers of the Pioneer League, batting .318 with two home runs, 38 RBIs and nine stolen bases. He was promoted to the Low A Beloit Snappers for the 2004 minor league season, finishing eighth in the Midwest League with a .307 batting average, as well as reaching 22 doubles, 59 RBIs and 64 runs across 123 games played.

In 2005, Anderson was promoted to the High A Brevard County Manatees, playing in 129 games with 6 home runs and a Florida State League-leading 158 hits, and slashing .311/.360/.407 with 7 triples, before again being promoted to the Double-A Huntsville Stars to begin the 2006 season.

=== 2006–07: Continued success and Brewers debut ===
Beginning 2006 with the Huntsville Stars of the Southern League, Anderson was promoted to the Triple A Pacific Coast League's Nashville Sounds in mid-August, posting a combined .297 batting average with seven home runs, 52 RBIs and 20 stolen bases across 124 games.

That September, Anderson was called up to the Milwaukee Brewers and made his Major League debut on September 11 against the Pittsburgh Pirates, striking out against Salomón Torres as a pinch hitter to end the game. After being brought into the game as a pinch runner in the bottom of the 9th inning against the St. Louis Cardinals on September 18, Anderson came home to score the winning run after a single hit by Tony Graffanino off Braden Looper. In his first start on September 21, against the San Francisco Giants, Anderson recorded his first Major League hit, a single off Matt Morris. He appeared in a total 9 games for the Brewers, batting .111 with three runs scored to end the season.

Returning to the Triple A Nashville Sounds for the 2007 season, Anderson played 108 games and led the team in doubles and stolen bases, with 28 and 16 respectively, and reached a .273 batting average. He also made 12 appearances at the Double A Huntsville Stars between May 21 and June 2, producing a pair of four-hit games and slashing .444/.444/.756 with one home run and 11 RBIs. Across 120 games played, Anderson hit .291 with five home runs, 47 RBIs and 17 total stolen bases.

=== 2008: Cincinnati Reds minors debut ===
The Brewers designated Anderson for assignment on January 15, 2008, and he was claimed off waivers by the Cincinnati Reds three days later. He spent 2008 with the Reds' Triple A affiliate Louisville Bats, reaching base in 30 consecutive games between June 4 and June 30 and achieving a 14-game hitting streak in that same span before finishing the season batting .290 with eight home runs and 71 RBIs.

=== 2009–10: Return to the Brewers, free agency ===
Anderson was released by the Reds prior to the 2009 season, only to be re-signed by the Milwaukee Brewers to a minor league contract and subsequently assigned to the Huntsville Stars. Splitting the season between Huntsville and the Nashville Sounds, he batted .294/.370/.444 while scoring a career-high ten home runs. He elected free agency at the end of the season, signing with the Brewers on May 3, 2010 to a one-year contract, and was assigned to the Nashville Sounds before again splitting the season between Nashville and Huntsville. That year, Anderson slashed .281/.375/.462 with 35 extra base hits and 48 RBIs across 339 total plate appearances, before again entering free agency at the end of the season. He has not made a professional baseball appearance since.

== Scouting career ==
After making his final professional baseball appearance in 2010, Anderson was hired by the Brewers as an area scout for the Midwestern United States, covering territory including Nebraska, Kansas, Minnesota, North Dakota, and South Dakota. He has since become their amateur scouting regional supervisor, and assisted in signing players such as Aaron Ashby and Monte Harrison.
