= KPTM =

Television station in Omaha, Nebraska

- Omaha, Nebraska; Council Bluffs, Iowa; United States
- City: Omaha, Nebraska
- Channels: Digital: 26 (UHF); Virtual: 42
- Branding: Fox 42; myKPTM (42.2); Omaha CW (42.3)

Programming
- Affiliations: 42.1: Fox; 42.2: MyNetworkTV/Dabl; 42.3: The CW; 42.4: Comet

Ownership
- Owner: Sinclair Broadcast Group; (KPTM Licensee, LLC)
- Sister stations: KXVO

History
- First air date: April 6, 1986
- Former channel numbers: Analog: 42 (UHF, 1986–2009); Digital: 43 (UHF, 2002–2019)
- Former affiliations: Independent (1986–1988)
- Call sign meaning: Pappas Telecasting of the Midlands, founding owner

Technical information
- Licensing authority: FCC
- Facility ID: 51491
- ERP: 800 kW
- HAAT: 475 m (1,558 ft)
- Transmitter coordinates: 41°4′15.9″N 96°13′32.3″W

Links
- Public license information: Public file; LMS
- Website: fox42kptm.com; cwomaha.tv

KPTM (channel 42) is a television station in Omaha, Nebraska, United States, affiliated with Fox and The CW. It is owned by Sinclair Broadcast Group alongside KXVO (channel 15). The two stations share studios on Farnam Street in Omaha; KPTM's transmitter is located on Pflug Road, south of Gretna and I-80.

KPTM went on air as Omaha's first independent station in 1986. It was built by and named for California-based Pappas Telecasting. KPTM affiliated with Fox in 1988, after Pappas originally sat out the network's launch, and began airing local newscasts in June 1990. After the bankruptcy of Pappas, Titan Broadcast Management acquired the station in 2009, selling most of its broadcasting properties to Sinclair in 2013. While KPTM aired a 9 p.m. newscast for more than 30 years, it was unsuccessful at growing its news department beyond that: between 1998 and 2000, the station aired and then canceled a morning newscast, and a 4 p.m. newscast lasted two years in the late 2000s. For the last decade of KPTM offering newscasts, the news programs were presented by talent outside the Omaha market.

== History ==
=== Construction and Pappas ownership ===
Pappas Telecasting began conducting community surveys in February 1979 looking toward establishing a station on ultra high frequency (UHF) channel 15 in Omaha; the company also leased the building at 2615 Farnam Street, recently vacated by KMTV. Channel 15 was contested by multiple parties, with three groups in the running by June 1979 and a total of eight by early November, when Pappas switched from seeking channel 15 to channel 42. There was only one other group that had filed for channel 42: Christian Broadcasting of the Midlands, which in March filed an application proposing a Christian television station.

Pappas was selected over Christian Broadcasting by a Federal Communications Commission (FCC) administrative law judge for a construction permit in 1984 and announced its plans to put channel 42 on the air by October 1985. However, the battle between the two applicants continued because Christian Broadcasting of the Midlands appealed the initial decision to the FCC review board and the full commission.

After Christian lost, construction began on KPTM (taking its name from the owner, Pappas Telecasting of the Midlands). A tower was built in Sarpy County, Nebraska, while a former insurance office at 4625 Farnam was renovated for the TV station. Prior to the launch of KPTM, Omaha had no independent stations. Only KBGT-TV "Big 8", which primarily served the central and western part of the state, operated as an independent in Nebraska, and two independent stations operated in Iowa.

KPTM began broadcasting on April 6, 1986. Even though it was the only non-network station in Omaha, it refused to join the fledgling Fox network at its launch that October. Doing so meant KPTM would have had to carry Fox's first and initially only offering, The Late Show Starring Joan Rivers, opposite The Tonight Show. At the time, The Tonight Show was hosted by Johnny Carson, a native of nearby Corning, Iowa, who spent his youth in Norfolk, Nebraska, and had begun his career at Omaha's WOW-TV in the early 1950s. Station manager Gary Nielsen told the Lincoln Journal Star, "Why would you program Joan Rivers in Johnny Carson's hometown?" In the July 1986 Arbitron ratings, KPTM was the highest-rated independent station in the country in prime time and the third-highest in total-day audience share.

In September 1988, the three Pappas independents—KPTM; KMPH-TV in Fresno, California; and WHNS in Asheville, North Carolina—joined Fox. Pappas expanded its programming in the Omaha market when it began operating the new KXVO (channel 15) in 1995; the station, owned by Cocola Broadcasting, was an affiliate of The WB.

=== Titan and Sinclair ownership ===
In the 2000s, Pappas encountered financial difficulties arising from a downturn in the national advertising market, particularly for housing and cars, as well as the company's unsuccessful attempt at expanding into Spanish-language programming with Azteca América. In 2006, Fortress Credit Corporation lent the company $284 million but went unpaid; Pappas's debt exceeded its assets. Thirteen Pappas Telecasting stations, a total including KPTM and KXVO, filed for bankruptcy in May 2008. The bankruptcy judge ordered a sale of the stations in September 2008. Ten of them, including KPTM and its local marketing agreement to program KXVO, were sold to New World TV Group and its subsidiary, Titan Broadcast Management, in 2009. During this time, co-owned KCWL-TV in Lincoln was converted to an in-market Fox affiliate as KFXL-TV. Cable carriage of KPTM's high-definition feed in Lincoln was discontinued in 2012 in favor of KFXL-TV, though KPTM continued to be offered in standard definition.

KPTM completed its conversion to digital television on June 12, 2009. The station's digital transmissions remained on channel 43, using virtual channel 42, until KPTM relocated its signal from channel 43 to channel 26 on June 2, 2019, as a result of the 2016 United States wireless spectrum auction.

Titan TV Broadcast Group announced the sale of most of its stations, including KPTM, to Sinclair Broadcast Group on June 3, 2013; the purchase included the local marketing agreement with KXVO, which remained under Mitts Telecasting LLC ownership after the sale. Sinclair announced the closing of the sale on October 3.

== News operation ==
=== Under Pappas ===
At the end of 1989, new KPTM general manager Hal Protter announced that the station would debut a weeknight 9 p.m. newscast in 1990. Protter was familiar with news on independent stations, having supervised newsrooms at KPLR-TV in St. Louis, KRBK-TV in Sacramento, and WVTV in Milwaukee. On June 14, 1990, the Nine O'Clock Nightly News debuted as a half-hour program; the newscast title had previously been used by Protter at WVTV. The month before, the station had aired its first live news program when it broadcast cut-ins of Nebraska election returns during its prime time programming. Fox took interest in the startup newsroom in Omaha as a model for Fox stations in smaller markets seeking to add newscasts. The half-hour newscast expanded to an hour in October 1995, a change that had been planned for several years.

The KPTM news department made plans for expansion in 1998 with the launch of a 3 1/2-hour morning newscast, Good Day, as well as an 11 a.m. newscast. Pappas invested $1.5 million in new equipment and a new news set and doubled the news staffing. The previous set was then shipped to the Pappas-owned Nebraska Television Network (NTV) in Kearney. However, the news expansions were rolled back for economic reasons in March 2000, resulting in 28 employees being laid off. Generally, KPTM's newscasts had a higher proportion of national news stories than their competitors. Another expansion was attempted with a 4 p.m. newscast in 2007, but this was canceled in 2009 as the station laid off 22 staffers due to a slowing economy.

=== Outsourcing and shutdown ===
On July 6, 2010, station management announced it would cease presenting the newscast in Omaha and outsource production of the 9 p.m. newscast to the Independent News Network (INN) of Davenport, Iowa, starting September 6. The move allowed KPTM to convert its newscasts to high-definition production but resulted in layoffs in Omaha. In a 2011 interview with Broadcasting & Cable, general manager Jeff Miller credited the outsourcing to INN with allowing KPTM to "stay in the news game".

By July 2013, after the announcement that KPTM would be acquired by Sinclair, the station announced it would discontinue its agreement with INN and return production of the 9 p.m. newscast in-house, with station management citing viewers' dislike of the outsourced production model. At the outset, the "On the Street" setup would be retained, but the newscasts would be produced with the assistance of KPTM's Fresno sister station, KMPH-TV. As late as 2022, the Fresno-produced news program was described by its general manager as "a nice looking, locally flavored, profitable newscast".

Sinclair shut down the Fresno-produced KPTM newscast on May 12, 2023, making Omaha one of five markets where all newscasts on Sinclair-owned stations were discontinued in favor of The National Desk.

== Technical information and subchannels ==
KPTM's transmitter is located on Pflug Road, south of Gretna and I-80. The station's signal is multiplexed:

Subchannels of KPTM
Subchannel	Res.	Short name	Programming
42.1	720p	FOX42	Fox
42.2	480i	MyTV	MyNetworkTV & Dabl
42.3	720p	CW	The CW
42.4	480i	Comet	Comet
15.1	480i	ROAR	Roar (KXVO)

Broadcast on behalf of another station

The main subchannel of KXVO, with programming from The CW, became the 42.3 subchannel of KPTM on September 14, 2021. KXVO then began broadcasting programming from the Sinclair-owned diginet TBD, converting to ATSC 3.0 broadcasting in April 2022.
