= The Works (TV network) =

Former American television network

- Type: Digital broadcast television network
- Country: United States
- Broadcast area: Nationwide on OTA digital television and LPTV (covered 37%)
- Headquarters: Beverly Hills, California

Programming
- Language: English
- Picture format: 480i (SDTV)

Ownership
- Owner: MGM Television (Metro-Goldwyn-Mayer)

History
- Launched: April 1, 2014; 12 years ago
- Closed: February 28, 2017; 9 years ago
- Replaced by: Charge! (de facto)

The Works was an American digital broadcast television network owned by the MGM Television division of Metro-Goldwyn-Mayer. The network, which was primarily carried on the digital subchannels of television stations, maintained a general entertainment format featuring a mix of feature films, classic television sitcoms and drama series from the 1950s through the 1980s, and news and interview programming.

Through its ownership by MGM, The Works was a sister network to This TV, a joint venture between MGM and Tribune Broadcasting which also focuses on films and classic television series from the 1950s to the 1990s and carries programming from The Works' corporate cousin MGM Television.

== History ==
With little prior announcement of its formation in advance of its debut, Metro-Goldwyn-Mayer launched The Works on April 1, 2014; the network debuted on nine television stations owned or operated by Titan Broadcast Management (though either NRJ TV or Ellis Communications), with an initial clearance rate of, at minimum, 31% of all television households in the United States. In addition to carrying The Works on its stations, Titan Broadcast Management also handles advertising sales for the network. To make room for the network, Titan ended its affiliations with the Retro Television Network on most of its stations, swapping out that network with The Works. The network was formally launched in January 2015, with 26 affiliate stations, covering 37% of the nation's television households.

The Works subchannel network quietly pulled off the air around February 28, 2017, when remaining affiliates, consisting mainly of Titan Broadcast Management operated stations, switched to Charge!, a Sinclair-owned subchannel network formerly operated by MGM.

== Programming ==
The Works' program schedule relied primarily on the extensive library of films and television programming currently owned by MGM and subsidiary United Artists. Unlike many other digital multicast networks, The Works also featured some more recent and originally-produced programming.

The network maintained a general entertainment programming format with a large emphasis on theatrical feature films from the MGM library, sports and classic television series. News programming was also provided by the network through a programming agreement with The Huffington Post, which provided a rebroadcast of its discussion program Huff Post Live in separate two-hour blocks of news in the midday and early evening on Monday through Fridays; affiliates were also inclined to produce local news content to air on the network.

=== List of programs broadcast by The Works ===
==== Classic television series ====
- The Addams Family
- American Gladiators
- Comedy Time
- Home Run Derby
- Science Fiction Theatre
- The Rat Patrol
- Quick Laffs

==== Children's programming ====
- Boomerang^{E/I} (imported from Australia)
- Johnny Sokko and His Flying Robot (imported from Japan)
- Heroes Among Us^{E/I}
- Jack Hanna's Into the Wild^{E/I}
- Killer Instinct^{E/I}
- Prince Planet (imported from Japan)

==== News/interview programming ====
- Huff Post Live
