= Brett Maher (gridiron football) =

American football player (born 1989)

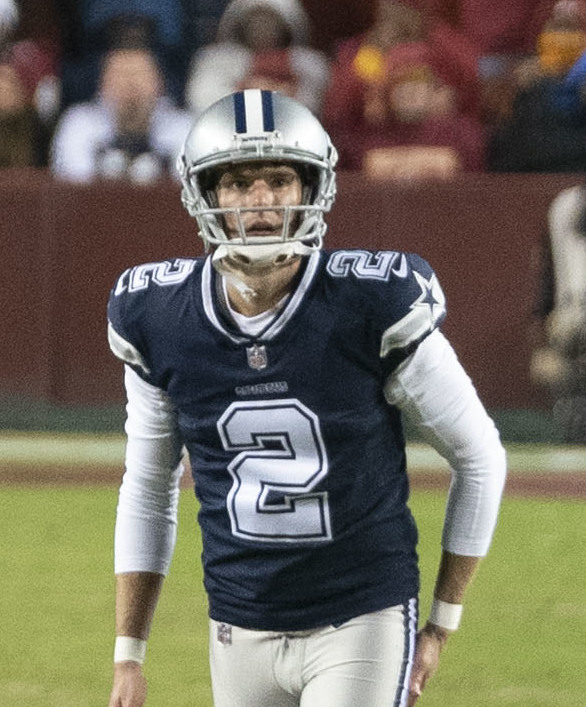
- Maher with the Dallas Cowboys in 2018

Nebraska Cornhuskers
- Title: Special teams coordinator

Personal information
- Born: November 21, 1989 (age 37); Fremont, Nebraska, U.S.
- Listed height: 6 ft 0 in (1.83 m)
- Listed weight: 180 lb (82 kg)

Career information
- Position: Placekicker (No. 3, 2, 19, 6, 8)
- High school: Kearney (Kearney, Nebraska)
- College: Nebraska (2008–2012)
- NFL draft: 2013: undrafted

Career history

Playing
- New York Jets (2013)*; Dallas Cowboys (2013)*; Winnipeg Blue Bombers (2014)*; Ottawa Redblacks (2014–2015); Hamilton Tiger-Cats (2016); Cleveland Browns (2017)*; Ottawa Redblacks (2017); Dallas Cowboys (2018–2019); New York Jets (2020)*; Washington Football Team (2020)*; Houston Texans (2020)*; Arizona Cardinals (2020–2021)*; New Orleans Saints (2021); Dallas Cowboys (2022); Denver Broncos (2023)*; Los Angeles Rams (2023)
- * Offseason or practice squad member only

Coaching
- Nebraska (2024–present); Special teams consultant (2024); Assistant special teams coach (2025); Special teams coordinator (2026–present)

Awards and highlights
- CFL East All-Star (2017) (Note: Selected as a punter); Vlade Award (2011); 2× Big Ten Kicker of the Year (2011, 2012) (Note: Co-winner with Jeff Budzien this season); Big Ten Punter of the Year (2011); Second-team All-Big Ten (2012) (Note: Selected both as kicker and punter); First-team All-Big Ten (2011)

Career NFL statistics
- Field goals made: 111
- Field goals attempted: 139
- Field goal percentage: 79.9%
- Longest field goal: 63
- Extra points made: 141
- Extra points attempted: 149
- Extra point percentage: 94.6%
- Points scored: 474
- Stats at Pro Football Reference

Career CFL statistics
- Field goals made: 82
- Field goals attempted: 100
- Punts: 208
- Punting yards: 9,645
- Points scored: 303
- Stats at CFL.ca

Brett Maher (/ˈmɑːhər/ MAH-hər; born November 21, 1989) is an American former professional football placekicker who is currently the special teams coordinator at Nebraska. He played college football for the Nebraska Cornhuskers and signed with the New York Jets as an undrafted free agent in 2013. Maher was also a member of eight other National Football League (NFL) teams and three Canadian Football League (CFL) teams.

== Early life ==
Maher attended Centennial Public Schools in Utica, Nebraska for his first three years of high school before transferring to Kearney High School, where he played high school football for the Bearcats.

As a senior, Maher made 8-of-14 field goals, 41 of 46 extra points, and averaged 41.1 yards per punt. He also played wide receiver, posting 775 receiving yards and 10 touchdowns. Maher received All-state honors from the Lincoln Journal Star and Omaha World-Herald at the end of the season.

In basketball, Maher was an honorable-mention Class A all-state pick as a senior. In track, he won the long jump and pole vault state championships as a senior, setting a state record in the latter. Maher has pole vaulted 4.93 m (16 ft 2 in).

== College career ==
Maher turned down other football scholarship offers to walk-on at the University of Nebraska–Lincoln. As a redshirt freshman and as a sophomore, he appeared in all games as the holder for field goals and extra points, while also serving as the backup punter behind Alex Henery.

As a junior, Maher was named the starter at placekicker and punter after Henery graduated. Maher made 19-of-23 field goals, 43-of-44 extra points and averaged 44.5 yards per punt (sixth in school history). He received Big Ten Conference Special Teams Player of the Week honors three times, while being named Eddleman-Fields Big Ten Punter of the Year and Bakken-Andersen Big Ten Kicker of the Year. Maher became one of the few specialists in Big Ten history to be named All-Conference both at kicker and punter in the same season.

As a senior, the school awarded Maher with a football scholarship. He made 20-of-27 field goals, all of his 59 extra point attempts, 57 touchbacks out of 96 kickoffs, and averaged 41.8 yards per punt. Maher's 20 field goals ranked second in school history for a season, and his 119 points set a record for most points scored by a kicker. Maher ranked third overall in conference in scoring and first among kickers. He received the Bakken-Andersen Big Ten Kicker-of-the-Year Award for the second straight year.

Maher finished his collegiate career with 39-of-50 made field goals (78%), 219 points, 120 punts for a 43.2-yard average and 43 punts inside the 20-yard line.

== Professional career ==
Pre-draft measurables
Height	Weight	Arm length	Hand span
6 ft 0 in (1.83 m)	186 lb (84 kg)	31 5/8 in (0.80 m)	9 1/8 in (0.23 m)
All values from NFL Combine

=== New York Jets (first stint) ===
Maher was signed as an undrafted free agent by the New York Jets after the 2013 NFL draft on May 12, 2013, earning the contract following a rookie minicamp tryout. He was waived on July 23 to make room for placekicker Billy Cundiff.

=== Dallas Cowboys (first stint) ===
On August 11, 2013, Maher was signed by the Dallas Cowboys, to play in the preseason while Dan Bailey recovered from an injury. Maher was released two weeks later on August 27.

=== Winnipeg Blue Bombers ===
On May 1, 2014, Maher signed a contract with the Winnipeg Blue Bombers of the Canadian Football League (CFL). He played in two preseason games for the Bombers before being released by the team due to the restrictions on the number of national and international players on the team's roster; the team kept their Canadian incumbent, Lirim Hajrullahu.

=== Ottawa Redblacks (first stint) ===
A few weeks after being released by Winnipeg, Maher signed with the Ottawa Redblacks. In Week 4 of the season, Maher was named the CFL's Special Teams Player of the Week after going 6-for-6 on field goals, scoring all the Redblacks' points in a narrow 18–17 victory over the Toronto Argonauts. The victory marked the expansion club's first-ever win. On May 13, 2015, Maher was released by the Redblacks because of a hip injury he suffered in the prior month, before the start of training camp. Maher missed all but four games during the season due to the injury.

=== Hamilton Tiger-Cats ===
On May 19, 2016, Maher signed with the Hamilton Tiger-Cats after taking part in a team minicamp. He completed 82% of his field goal attempts that season, going 41-for-50, and had a punt average of 45.9 yards.

=== Cleveland Browns ===
On March 20, 2017, Maher signed with the Cleveland Browns. On May 2, he was released after not being able to pass rookie Zane Gonzalez on the depth chart.

=== Ottawa Redblacks (second stint) ===
On June 10, 2017, Maher signed with the Redblacks. He achieved the same completion percentage as the previous season in Hamilton (82%), recording the same number of field goals (41) on 50 attempts. Maher's punt average was 46.7 yards.

=== Dallas Cowboys (second stint) ===
==== 2018 season ====
On April 4, 2018, Maher signed with the Cowboys, to limit the off-season workload of Dan Bailey. Maher went 4-of-5 on field goal attempts in the preseason, which included two 45-yarders and a 57-yard field goal. On September 1, in a surprise move, the Cowboys released Bailey, making Maher the team's kicker to start the season. His NFL debut came in the season opener against the Carolina Panthers, where he missed his first career field goal attempt (47 yards). Maher would then go on to make 15 straight field goal attempts.

During Week 4, Maher kicked all four field goals (32, 43, 22, and 38 yards), including a 38-yard game-winner as time expired, in a 26–24 comeback victory over the Detroit Lions, earning him NFC Special Teams Player of the Week honors. Two weeks later against the Jacksonville Jaguars, Maher converted four field goals, including a 55-yarder which at the time was his career long and the second-longest field goal in AT&T Stadium behind Dan Bailey's 56-yard field goal. From Weeks 7 to 11, Maher missed either a field goal or an extra point in four straight games.

On November 18, Maher kicked a 48-yard game-winning field goal to beat the Atlanta Falcons. Three weeks later, he kicked a new career-long 62-yard field goal against the Philadelphia Eagles as time expired in the first half. The field goal also set a franchise record and tied for the third-longest in NFL history.

During Week 16, Maher converted two field goals (including the second longest in franchise history-59 yards) and three extra points in a 27–20 victory over the Tampa Bay Buccaneers, earning him his second NFC Special Teams Player of the Week award of the season. Maher made 5-of-8 (63%) field goal attempts in the final four games (not including playoffs), missing a field goal in three of the last four games.

Maher finished with 29-of-36 field goals (80.6%), 32-of-33 extra points and 67.5% touchbacks of his kickoffs. He ranked eighth in the league with 29 field goals and tied for most field goals of at least 50 yards (6), which also tied a franchise record for a single season. Maher was 25th in field goal percentage and tied for 11th in the league in accuracy from 40 to 49 yards (7-of-11).

==== 2019 season ====
In 2019, Maher struggled with his accuracy during the preseason, but the team showed confidence on his ability by not bringing another kicker to compete with him. During Week 5, Maher made one out of three field goal attempts against the Green Bay Packers. However, in the next game against the Jets, he became the first kicker in NFL history to have two made field goals of 62 or more yards in a career. The following week, Maher set a new career long and broke his own franchise record when he made a 63-yard field goal against the Philadelphia Eagles. He finished the game converting all four of his extra points and all three of his field goals, earning NFC Special Teams Player of the Week honors.

Maher kept struggling during the season with accuracy issues, but the team was patient, waiting for him to play through it. During Week 13, he missed two field goals (one deflected) in the 26–15 loss against the Buffalo Bills on Thanksgiving. In the next game, Maher missed a 42-yard field goal during a 31–24 road loss to the Chicago Bears, his 10th miss of the season. Although Maher converted a 31-yard attempt in the final two minutes to cut the lead to seven points, he also hit a kickoff out of bounds early in the fourth quarter, helping the Bears take over at their own 40-yard line. After the game, Maher was quoted in the media as saying: "I felt like I hit every ball pretty well tonight. I'll put my head on the pillow tonight feeling good about what I did this week and moving forward".

On December 9, with the team having lost three consecutive games and in jeopardy of missing the playoffs, Maher was released by the Cowboys after missing ten field goals, citing accuracy concerns. He finished the season converting just 20-of-30 field goals (67%), 7-of-13 (54%) on attempts between 30 and 49 yards, missing at least one attempt in 8 of 13 games and making all 36 extra points. Maher also set NFL career (3) and single-season (2) records for most field goals made of over 60 yards. Maher was replaced by Kai Forbath.

=== New York Jets (second stint) ===
On December 31, 2019, the Jets signed Maher to a reserve/futures contract. He was waived on August 31, 2020.

=== Washington Football Team ===
Maher signed with the practice squad of the Washington Football Team on September 10, 2020, before being released on September 30.

=== Houston Texans ===
On October 12, 2020, Maher was signed to the Houston Texans' practice squad. He was released on December 14.

=== Arizona Cardinals ===
On December 25, 2020, Maher was signed to the Arizona Cardinals' practice squad. He signed a reserve/future contract on January 5, 2021. On March 20, Maher was waived after the Cardinals signed placekicker Matt Prater.

=== New Orleans Saints ===
On August 10, 2021, Maher signed with the New Orleans Saints. He was waived/injured on August 17 and placed on injured reserve. He was waived four days later. Maher was re-signed to the practice squad on November 16 and was promoted to the active roster three weeks later. During Week 13 against his former team, the Cowboys, Maher was 1-for-2 on field goal attempts as the Saints lost 27–17. Two weeks later against the Buccaneers, he was responsible for the only points in the game making all three of his field goal attempts in a 9–0 shutout road victory. In the 2021 season, he converted 16 of 18 field goal attempts and 10 of 12 extra point attempts.

Maher was waived again on February 22, 2022.

=== Dallas Cowboys (third stint) ===
On August 9, 2022, the Cowboys signed Maher after releasing Jonathan Garibay to compete for the kicking position with Lirim Hajrullahu. He was waived on August 30, and signed to the practice squad the next day.

On September 17, the Cowboys promoted Maher from the practice squad. During Week 2 the Cincinnati Bengals, Maher kicked a 54-yard field goal in the second quarter and a 50-yard field goal with three seconds left to seal the 20–17 upset victory. In the next game, he hit three field goals in a Monday Night Football game against the New York Giants. However, before halftime, Maher just missed left of the uprights from 59 yards out, giving him a 3-for-4 performance. The following week, Maher hit all four field goals (53, 45, 28, 29) against the Commanders, but he had an extra point blocked, his fourth extra point miss of his career.

During Week 11, Maher converted all four field goals against the Minnesota Vikings, three of which were 50 yards or longer, including a 60-yard field goal that he had to make twice, because of a play review by the officiating crew. Maher became the first kicker in NFL history to convert four field goals from 60 or more yards. Maher finished the season 29-of-32 on field goal attempts and 9-for-11 on 50+ yard field goals. He also set the franchise record for most field goals made over 50 yards in a season.

On January 16, 2023, Maher missed four of five extra point attempts during the Cowboys' Wild Card Game against the Buccaneers, the most missed extra points in a game (regular season or playoffs) since extra points were first tracked in 1932. On January 22, 2023, he made 2-of-2 field goal attempts and had his first extra point of the game blocked against the San Francisco 49ers in the Divisional Round.

Although he struggled in the postseason, Maher had one of the best kicking regular seasons in franchise history, by making 29-of-32 field goals (90.6%), with 2 misses coming from 59-yard attempts, and was nine of 11 (82%) from 50-plus yards. He made 50-of-53 extra points attempts, with two of them being blocked. Maher led the league with 78 touchback kickoffs. Maher also set Cowboys single-season kicking records with 137 points scored and nine field goals made of 50-plus yards. After the season, it was reported that Maher chose not to re-sign with the team.

=== Denver Broncos ===
On July 25, 2023, Maher signed with the Denver Broncos. Maher was released after the Broncos announced that they had traded for former Saints kicker Wil Lutz on August 29.

=== Los Angeles Rams ===
On August 30, 2023, the Los Angeles Rams signed Maher to their practice squad. Maher was elevated from the practice squad for the Rams opener against the Seattle Seahawks where he went 3-for-5 on field goals and was reverted to the practice squad after the game. He was promoted to the active roster on September 12, 2023. Maher was released on October 24, 2023, after missing three kicks in a loss to the Pittsburgh Steelers two days prior.

On January 1, 2024, Maher was re-signed by the Rams after his replacement Lucas Havrisik struggled and was released. In the regular season finale against the 49ers, Maher missed on one of two extra point attempts. He finished the 2023 season converting 17 of 23 field goal attempts and 13 of 15 extra point attempts. Maher fared better in the Wild Card Round against the Lions, converting two extra point and all three field goal attempts during the narrow 24–23 road loss.

== Career statistics ==
=== NFL ===
Legend
	Led the league
**Bold**	Career high

==== Regular season ====
Year	Team	GP	Overall FGs				PATs			Points
Year	Team	GP	Lng	FGM	FGA	Pct	XPM	XPA	Pct	Points
2018	DAL	16	62	**29**	**36**	80.6	32	33	97.0	119
2019	DAL	13	**63**	20	30	66.7	36	36	**100.0**	96
2021	NO	8	42	16	18	88.9	10	12	83.3	58
2022	DAL	**17**	60	**29**	32	**90.6**	**50**	**53**	94.3	**137**
2023	LAR	8	54	17	23	73.9	13	15	86.7	64
Career		62	63	111	139	79.9	141	149	94.6	474

==== Postseason ====
Year	Team	GP	Overall FGs				PATs			Points
Year	Team	GP	Lng	FGM	FGA	Pct	XPM	XPA	Pct	Points
2018	DAL	**2**	39	1	2	50.0	5	5	**100.0**	8
2022	DAL	**2**	**43**	2	2	**100.0**	1	6	16.7	7
2023	LAR	1	29	**3**	**3**	**100.0**	2	2	**100.0**	11
Career		5	43	6	7	85.7	13	8	61.5	26

=== College ===
Year	Team	GP	Kicking							Punting		
Year	Team	GP	XPM	XPA	XP%	FGM	FGA	FG%	Pts	Punts	Yds	Avg
2011	Nebraska	13	43	44	97.7	19	23	82.6	100	59	2,626	44.5
2012	Nebraska	14	59	59	100.0	20	27	74.1	119	61	2,552	41.8
Career		27	102	103	99.0	39	50	78.0	219	120	5,178	43.2

== Coaching career ==
For the 2024 college football season, Maher returned to his alma mater, Nebraska, to serve on Matt Rhule's staff as a special teams consultant, mainly to help coach Nebraska's kickers.

On February 18, 2026, the Cornhuskers promoted Maher to serve as the team's special teams coordinator.

== Personal life ==
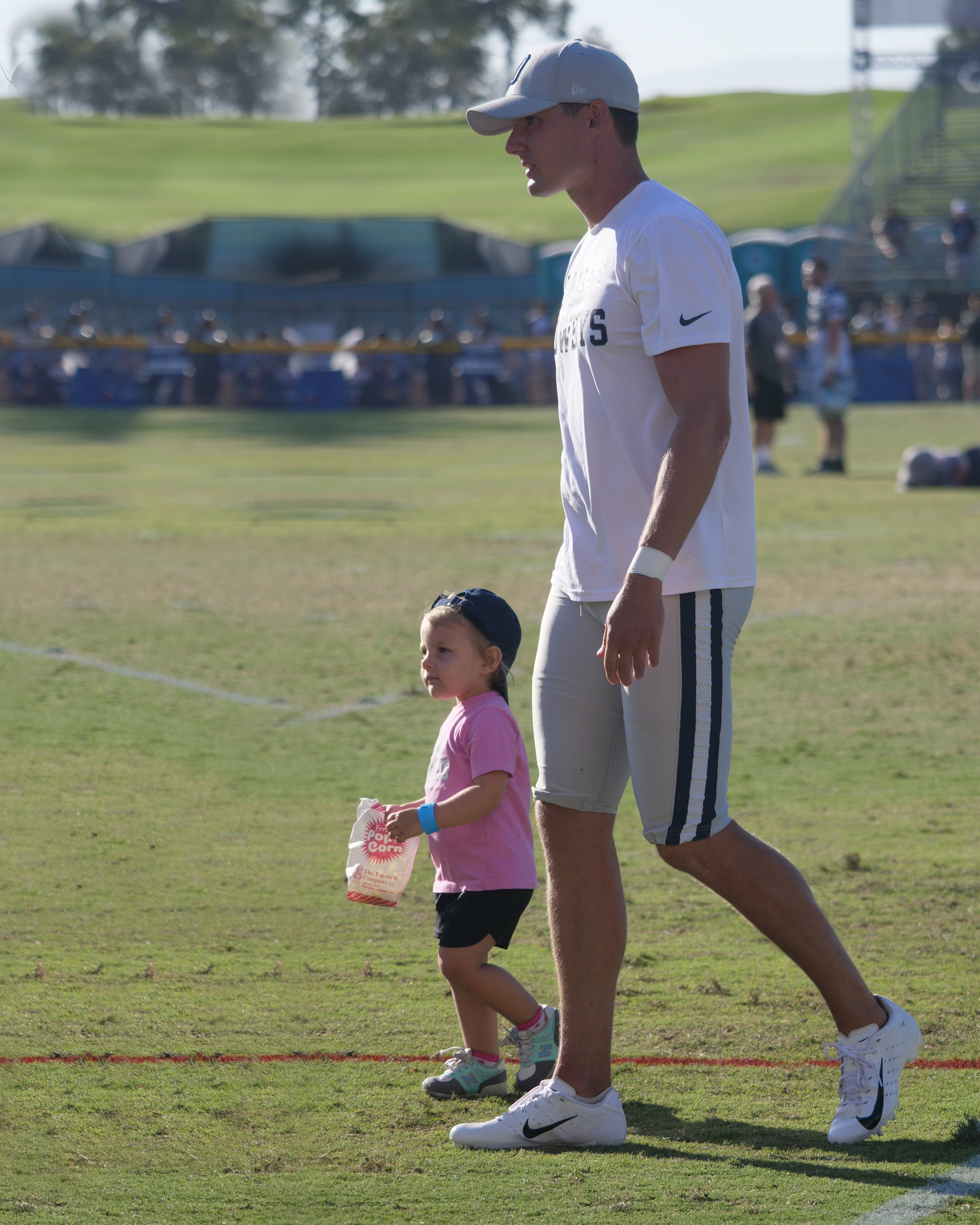
Maher with his daughter Laekyn in 2019

Maher married his high school sweetheart Jenna McBride in 2013. They have two daughters.
