= Kearney High School (Kearney, Nebraska) =

Public high school in Kearney, Nebraska

Location
- 2702 W. 11th Street; Kearney, Nebraska 68845; United States

Information
- School type: Public, high school
- School district: Kearney Public Schools
- Superintendent: Jason Mundorf
- Principal: Amber Lewis
- Staff: 91.74 (FTE)
- Grades: 9–12
- Enrollment: 1,654 (2023–2024)
- Student to teacher ratio: 18.03
- Colors: Blue and gold
- Athletics conference: Heartland Athletic Conference (HAC)
- Nickname: Bearcats
- Rival: Grand Island Islanders
- Website: khs.kearneypublicschools.org

Kearney High School is a public high school in Kearney, Nebraska, United States. It is part of the Kearney Public Schools district. It is one of two high schools in Kearney (the other being Kearney Catholic High School).

== Buildings ==
The original school was built in 1879 and was named Whittier School. It was used for grades K-12 until a new high school, Longfellow High School, was built in 1890. This was used until 1960 when the new high school was ready, and was later demolished. The school experienced several major additions. The original 1960 building featured an auditorium, band room, shared vocal/chorus room, cafeteria, offices, gym, library, and a lowered garden atrium. Since then, major additions included the vocational wing in 1981, the 400 Hallway in 1988, and the "Commons", 600 Hallway and North Gym in 1995.

In September 2013, Kearney voters approved a $75 million bond to build a new Kearney High School, in southwest Kearney; the building is located at 2702 West 11th Street. The new building is a third larger than its predecessor. Construction was finished in the fall of 2016. The old building was put up for auction, and the winning bid came from First Baptist Church of Kearney. The bid was $260,000.

== Sports ==
=== State championships ===
State championships
Season	Sport	Number of championships	Year
Fall	Football	1	2006
Fall	Cross country, boys'	6	2011, 2003, 2000, 1996, 1995, 1977
Fall	Volleyball, girls'	1	1978
Fall	Golf, girls'	4	1997, 1995, 1994, 1992
Fall	Tennis, boys'	3	1976, 1985, 1986
Winter	Wrestling	1	1998
Winter	Basketball, girls'	1	1982
Spring	Track and field, boys'	17	2024, 2014, 2013, 2012, 2009, 2008, 2004, 2003, 2002, 2001, 2000, 1999, 1998, 1997, 1996, 1995, 1994
Spring	Track and field, girls'	4	2016, 1996, 1995, 1972
Spring	Soccer, boys'	1	2018

== Notable alumni ==
- Drew Anderson, professional baseball player
- George A. Beecher (1868–1951), bishop of Western Nebraska
- Jon Bokenkamp, writer and producer
- Leslie Easterbrook, actress; best known for her role as Debbie Callahan in the Police Academy series
- Alva R. Fitch, lieutenant general in the United States Army
- Kyle Larson, professional football player
- Brett Maher, professional football player
- Peter George Peterson, United States Secretary of Commerce 1972–73; senior chairman of Blackstone Group
- Isaiah Stalbird, professional football player
- Charlie Tuna, Los Angeles radio and TV personality
