= Kearney Public Schools =

School district in Nebraska, United States

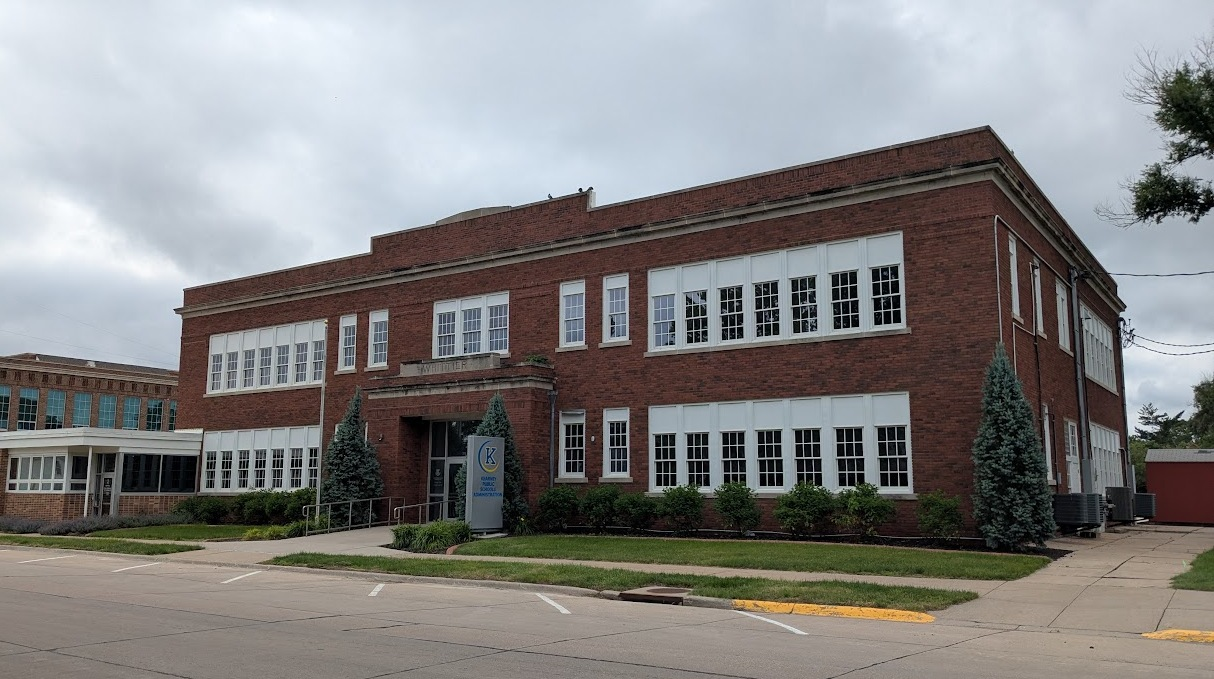

Location
- Nebraska United States
- Coordinates: 40.700162°N 99.085886°W

District information
- Type: Public
- Motto: "Own Your Future"
- Grades: Pre-kindergarten - 12
- Superintendent: Jason Mundorf
- Schools: 15

Students and staff
- Students: 6,177 (as of 2022)
- Teachers: 377.56 (FTE) (as of 2022)
- Staff: 668.58 (FTE) (as of 2022)

Other information
- Website: Kearney Public Schools

Kearney Public Schools is a school district serving the area of Kearney, Nebraska, United States.

== History ==
Historic Schools
Name	Location	Years active
Kearney's First School	Avenue A & 24th Street	1872-1890's
Whittier School	3rd Avenue & 22nd Street	1880-1920 K-12 1890-1920 Elementary Only 1929-1960 Manual Arts
Bryant School	1611 Avenue C	1885-1950
Emerson School	2705 Avenue E	1885-1950
Kenwood Elementary	1524 4th Avenue	1888-1935
Longfellow High	303 West 22nd Street	1890-1960
Alcott Elementary	1112 East 16th Street	1892-1933
Hawthorne Elementary	3400 Avenue A	1892-1933
Kearney High School	3610 6th Avenue	1960 - 2016

Superintendent History
Name	Years
M. I. Stuart	1885-1888
J. T. Morey	1888-1901
A.O. Thomas	1901-1905
George Burgert	1905-1909
Harry E. Bradford	1909-1912
Roy E. Cochran	1912-1915
A.L. Cariness	1915-1921
O.A. Wersig	1921-1932
Harry A. Burke	1933-1942
John D. Rice	1942-1947
E. Paul Morris	1947-1965
John R. Johnston	1965-1969
Harold G. Rowe	1969-1976
William F. Urbanek	1976-1980
James O. Howard	1980-1985
Jerry Barabas (interim)	1985-1986
Gary N. Hammack	1986-2001
Kenneth Anderson	2001-2007
Brian L. Maher	2007-2015
Virginia Moon (interim)	2015-2016
Kent B. Edwards	2016-2022
Jason Mundorf	2022-Present

== Schools ==
Elementary schools:

- Bryant Elementary School
- Buffalo Hills Elementary School
- Central Elementary School
- Emerson Elementary School
- Glenwood Elementary School
- Kenwood Elementary School
- Meadowlark Elementary School
- Northeast Elementary School
- Park Elementary School
- Windy Hills Elementary School

Middle schools:

- Horizon Middle School
- Sunrise Middle School

High schools:

- Kearney High School

Other Facilities:

- Hanny Arram Center for Success
- Bright Futures Preschool
- KPS Administration Office
- Merryman Performing Arts Center
