= Tri-Cities (Nebraska) =

- Region in Nebraska
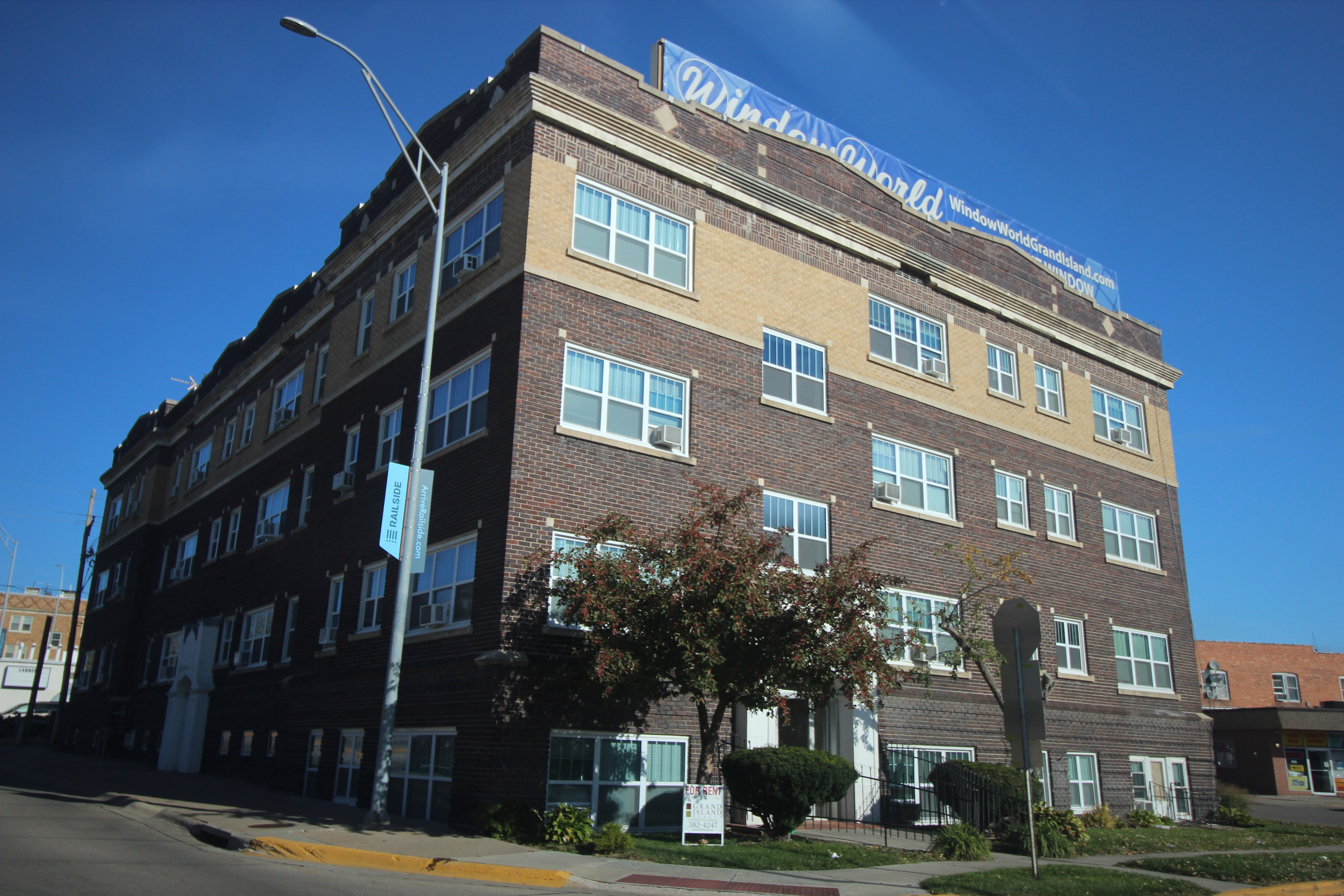
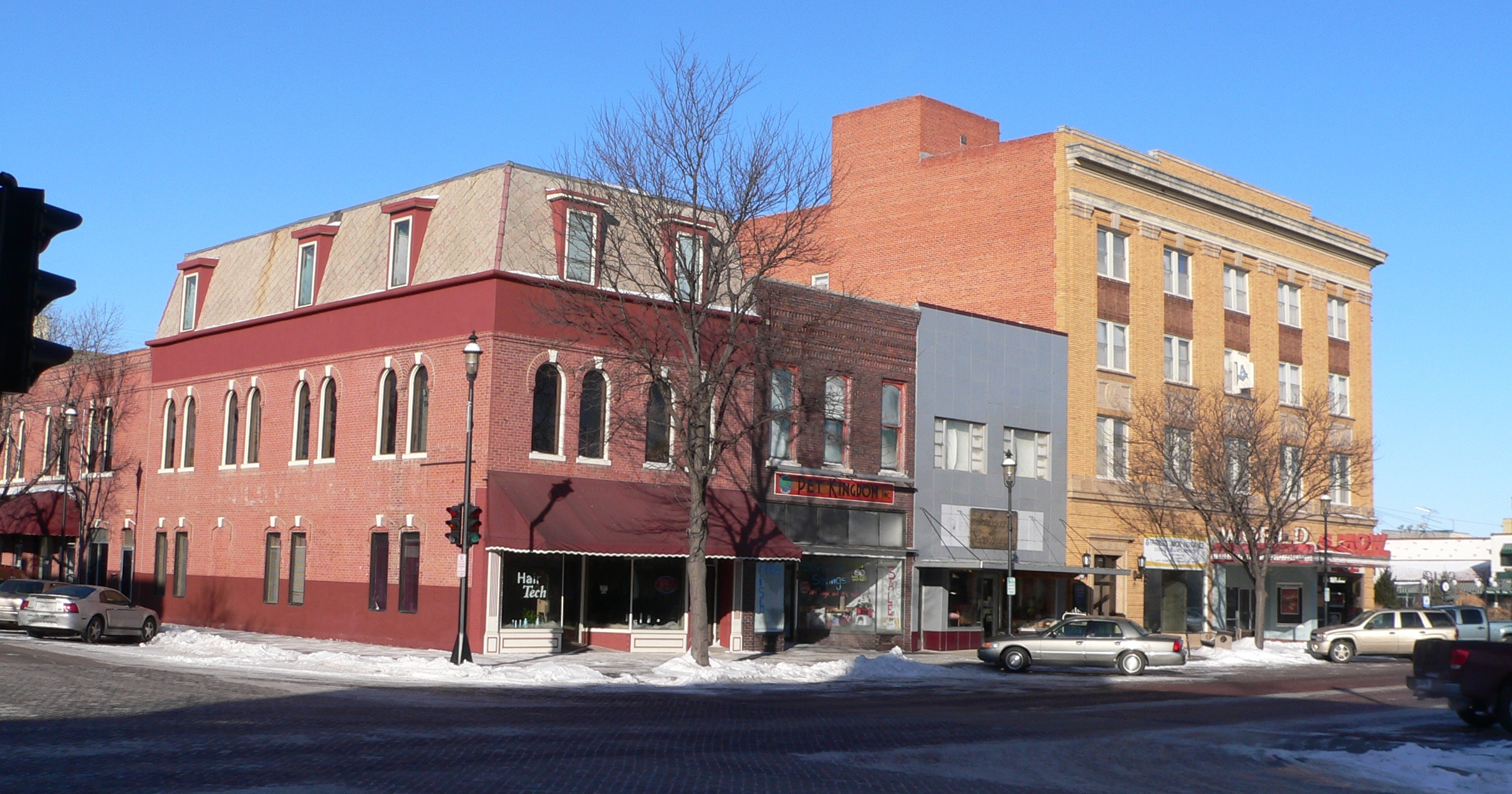
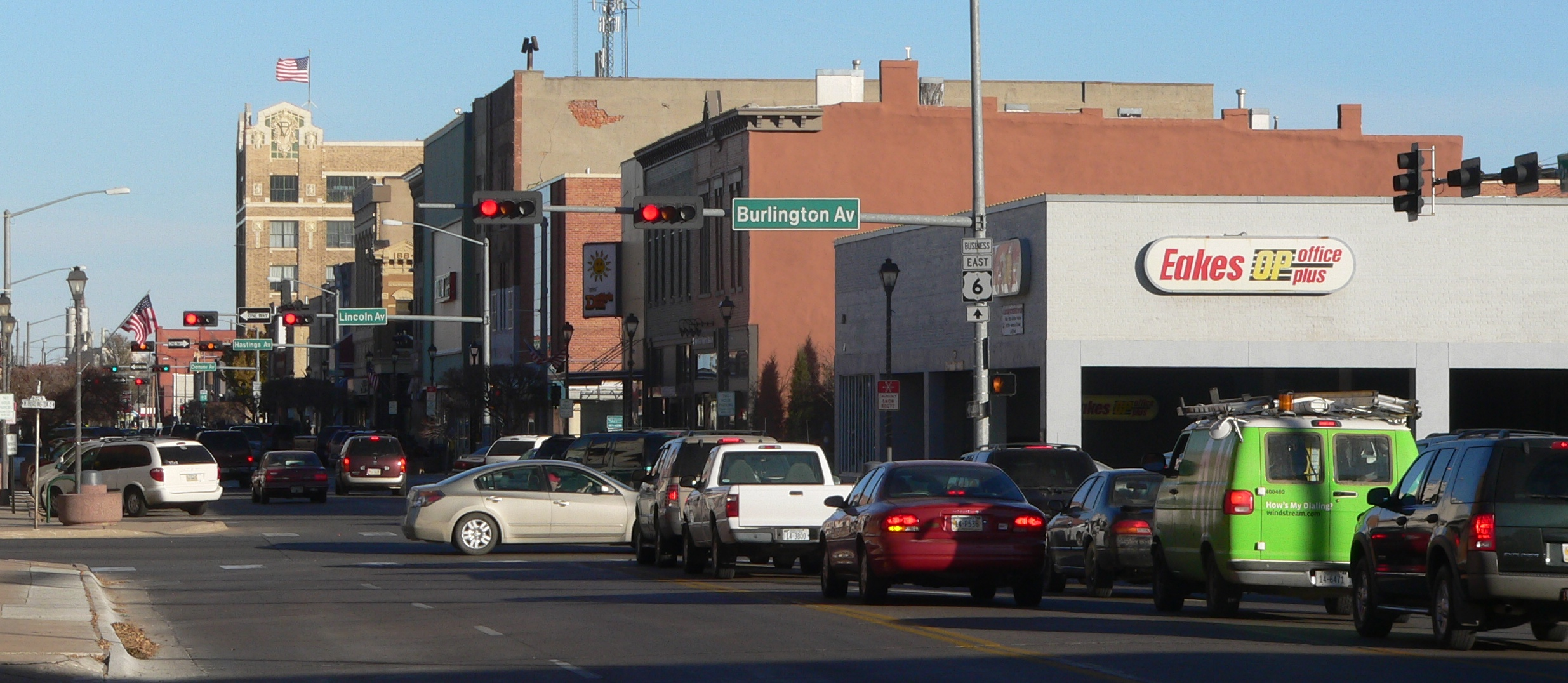
- Grand Island Kearney Hastings
- Country: United States
- State: Nebraska
- Cities: Grand Island, Kearney, Hastings

Population
  - Total: 174,530
- Time zone: UTC-6:00 (CST)
  - Summer (DST): UTC-5:00 (CDT)
- Area code: 308

The Tri-Cities is an area of Nebraska consisting of the cities of Grand Island, Hastings, and Kearney. It had a population of 174,530 as of 2020. The Tri-Cities region is not an official Metropolitan Statistical Area or Combined Statistical Area, however the region would be Nebraska's third largest if it was, behind Lincoln but ahead of Sioux City. The Tri-Cities area holds historical significance, with it being a major destination for pioneers heading west on the Oregon Trail. In recent years, the region has experienced large amounts of economic and population growth, with this being attributed to an influx in higher education jobs.

== History ==
=== Early settlement ===
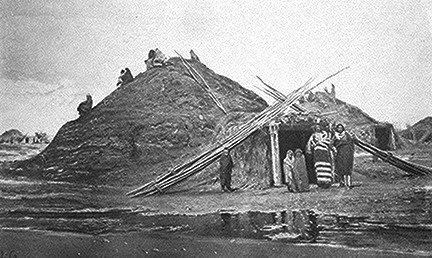
Members of the Pawnee Tribe

Before the arrival of European settlers, the Tri-Cities area was inhabited by various groups of indigenous peoples, including the Pawnee and Ponca. Members of these tribes famously hunted bison, which were once widespread in the area that became the Tri-Cities.

The first permanent European settlers arrived in 1845, with the construction of Fort Kearney. The fort was built as a response to large numbers of people passing through the region while travelling west. Throughout the 1840s and 50s, the region grew as a prominent supply post for those on the Oregon Trail, as well as for soldiers during the Indian Wars. The town of Grand Island was first settled in 1857 by a small group of settlers from Davenport, Iowa. Along with Kearney (near Fort Kearney), Grand Island became one of the most prominent supply posts for those heading west. When the Union Pacific Railroad arrived to the Tri-Cities area in the mid-1860s, the region experienced rapid growth to an increase in business, and trade. Later, in 1872, the town of Hastings was founded around 25 miles south of Grand Island. The town instantly became a boomtown, and by 1880, it had a population of over 2,000.

=== 20th century ===
Throughout the 20th century, the Tri-Cities region experienced robust economic and population growth. Due to the gradual decline of people heading west, the Tri-Cities economy shifted from business and trade to agriculture. The vast plains surrounding the cities were favorable for farming sugar beets, soybeans, and corn.

During the second half of the 20th century, a number of manufacturing jobs were located to the Tri-Cities area, primarily in Grand Island. Today, these jobs still employ a large portion of the city's population, and play a significant role in keeping Grand Island from experiencing population decline.

=== 21st century ===
In recent years, the Tri-Cities region has experienced robust population growth, most notably in Kearney and Grand Island. This is often cited as the result of a sharp increase in higher education jobs arriving in the region. These include jobs in agricultural research, technology, and education.

Grand Island, Kearney, and Hastings are 4th, 5th, and 8th most populous cities in Nebraska respectively. Based on past growth, and current growth estimates, it is possible that Kearney will surpass Grand Island as the region's most populous city in coming decades.

== Geography ==
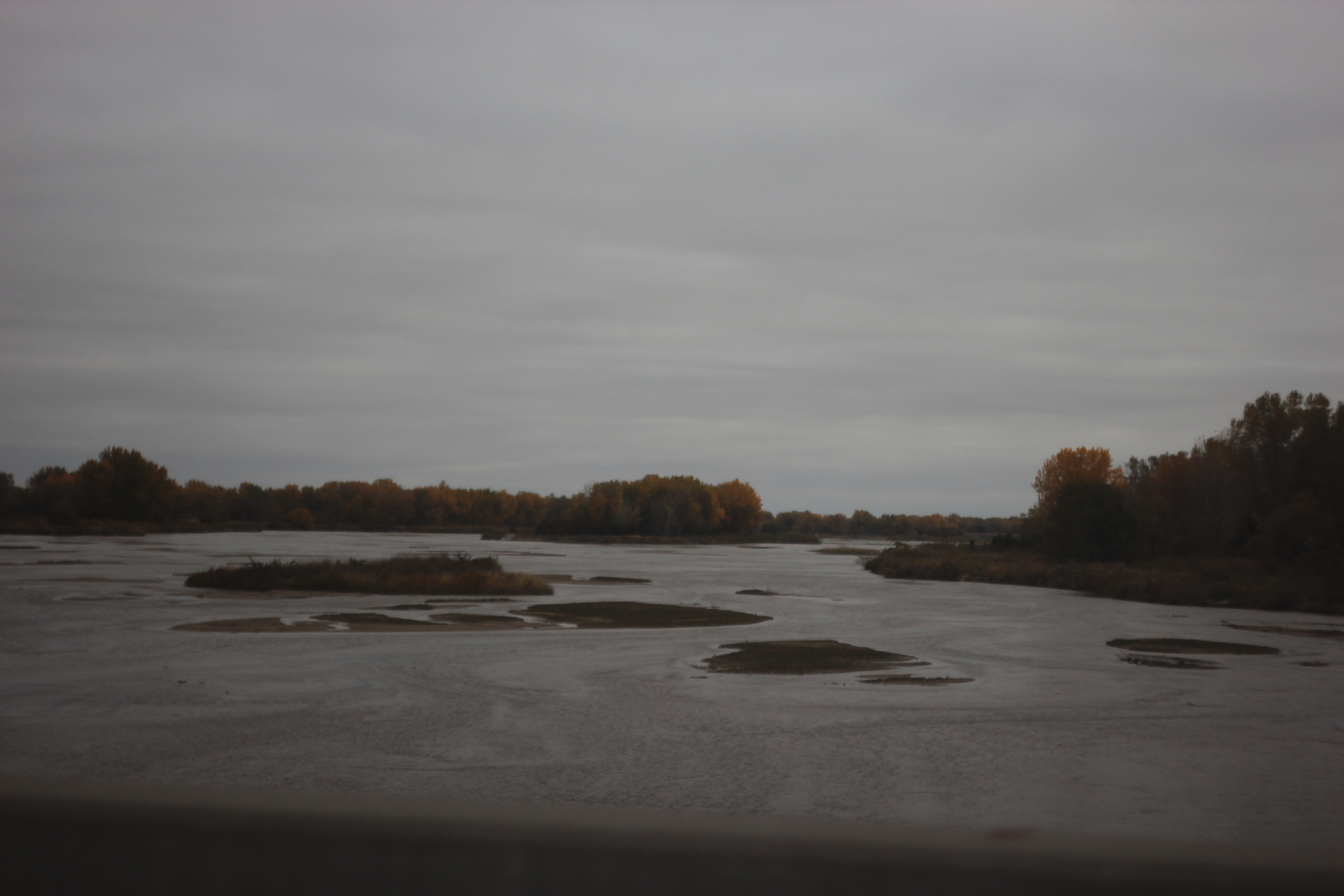
Platte River near Grand Island

The Tri-Cities region is located in central Nebraska, near the Platte River, which played a significant role in the region's early establishment and growth. The land surrounding area's major cities mainly consists of farmland, and gently rolling hills. Wooded areas are present, but fairly uncommon.

The Tri-Cities region is often described as being at the edge of the cultural Midwest, and the beginning of the greater Rocky Mountain region. This is due to the drier, and more arid climate of the state west of the Tri-Cities, as opposed to the more humid and forested eastern half of Nebraska.

The Tri-Cities region is usually defined as covering eight counties in central Nebraska. These include Adams, Buffalo, Clay, Hall, Howard, Merrick, Kearney, and Webster counties. In total, the region has a population of 174,530.

== Economy ==
The Tri-Cities economy was historically focused on agriculture and manufacturing, due to the large amount of open farmland surrounding the major cities. However, in recent years, a large number of higher education jobs have been brought to the region, with most of them being in Kearney.

The Tri-Cities region is home to either the primary or regional headquarters of several large companies including The Buckle, Clarcor, and the Eaton Corporation.

== Attractions and culture ==
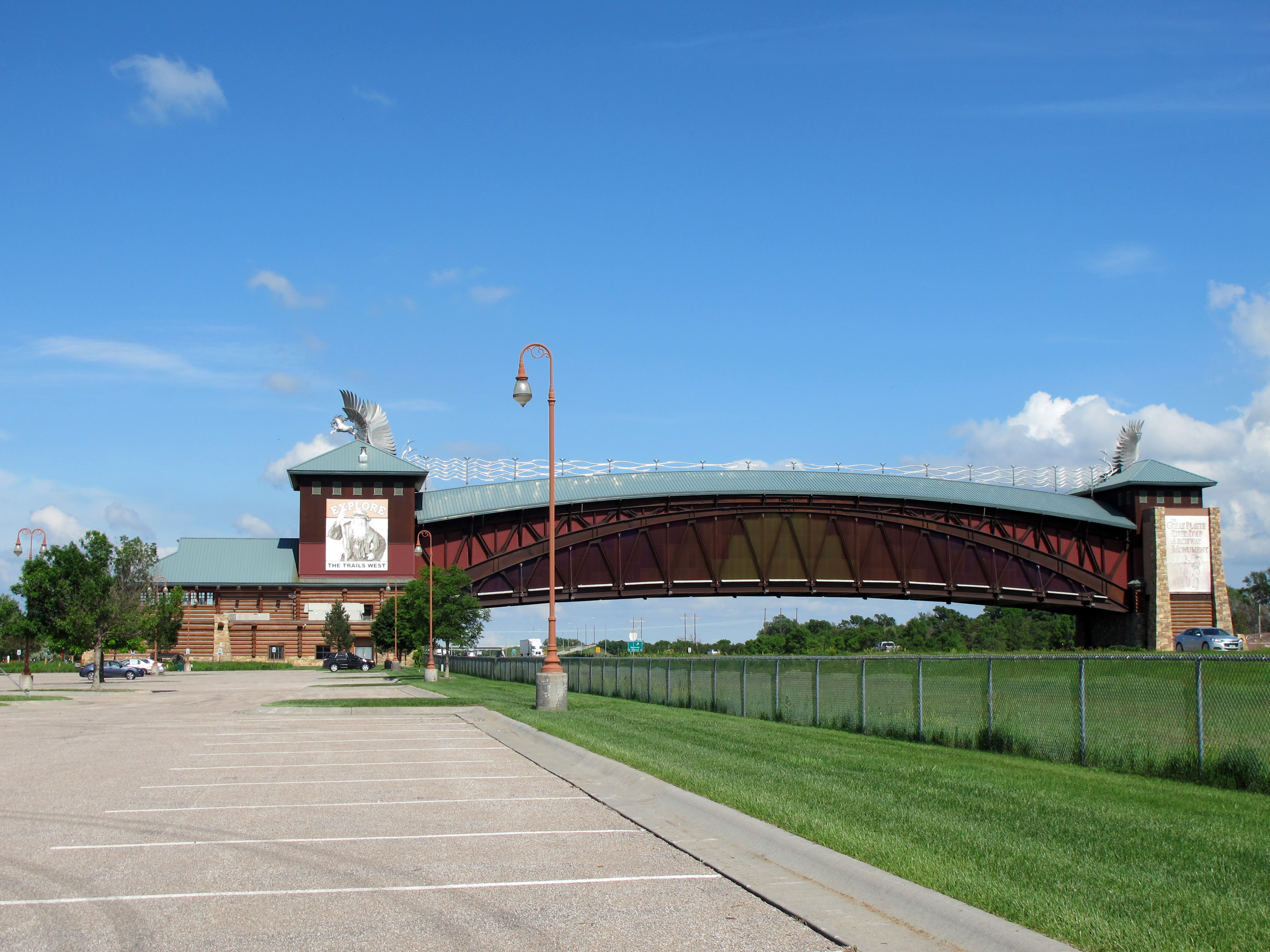
The Great Platte River Road Archway Monument

=== Major Attractions ===
The Tri-Cities area is home to a number of major attractions. These include the Kearney Arch, a large memorial and museum that reached over Interstate 80, as well as the Stuhr Museum, a museum dedicated to pioneers moving west, and the Hastings Museum, a museum of natural history and culture which claims the title of largest municipal museum between Chicago and Denver.

Grand Island is the home of the Nebraska State Fair, which attracts several hundred thousand people to the Tri-Cities region each year.

=== Inventions ===
Hastings, one of the Tri-Cities, is famously the town in which Kool-Aid was invented. Residence of the town often boast this, and the drink is even considered Nebraska's official soft drink.

== Education ==
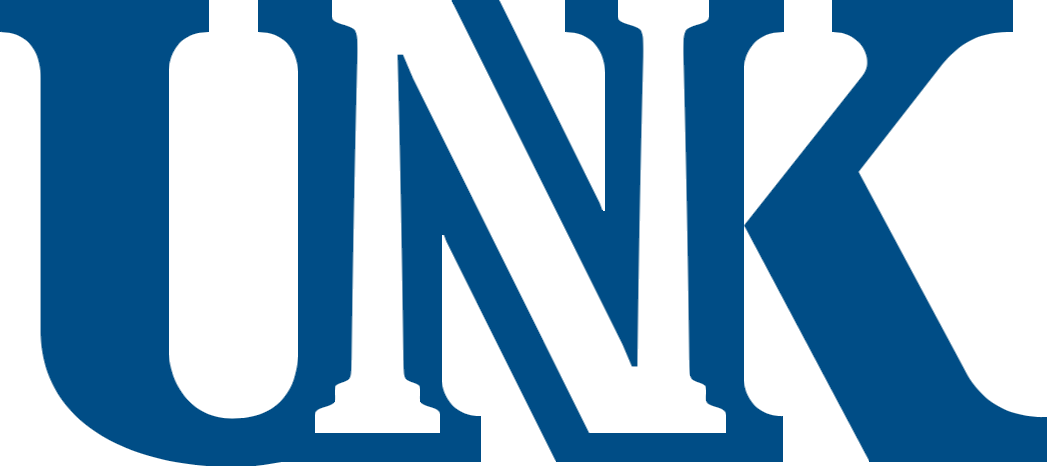
Logo of the University of Nebraska at Kearney

The largest college in the Tri-Cities is the University of Nebraska at Kearney, which had an attendance of over 6,000 students in 2019. Other regional colleges include Central Community College, which has campuses in both Grand Island and Hastings, and Hastings College of Liberal Arts. The most prominent school districts in the Tri-Cities include Grand Island Public Schools, Grand Island Northwest Public Schools, Kearney Public Schools, and Hastings Public Schools. Throughout each city, there are a number of private schools, with the majority of which being associated with religious institutions.

== See also ==
- Grand Island, Nebraska
- Hastings, Nebraska
- Kearney, Nebraska
