= KFXL-TV =

Television station in Lincoln, Nebraska

- Lincoln–Hastings–Kearney–; Grand Island, Nebraska; United States
- City: Lincoln, Nebraska
- Channels: Digital: 15 (UHF); Virtual: 51
- Branding: Fox Nebraska, KFXL

Programming
- Affiliations: 51.1: Fox; 51.2: Roar; 51.3: Charge!

Ownership
- Owner: Sinclair Broadcast Group; (KHGI Licensee, LLC)
- Sister stations: Nebraska Television Network

History
- First air date: June 26, 2006
- Former call signs: KOWH (June–August 2006); KCWL-TV (August 2006–2009)
- Former channel numbers: Analog: 51 (UHF, 2006–2009); Digital: 51 (UHF, 2008–2012)
- Former affiliations: The WB (June–September 2006); The CW (September 2006–2009)
- Call sign meaning: "Fox Lincoln"

Technical information
- Licensing authority: FCC
- Facility ID: 84453
- ERP: 250 kW
- HAAT: 190 m (623 ft)
- Transmitter coordinates: 40°43′39.7″N 96°36′50.9″W
- Translator(s): KHGI-TV 13.2 Kearney; KWNB-TV 6.2 Hayes Center; KWNB-LD 29.2 McCook

Links
- Public license information: Public file; LMS
- Website: foxnebraska.com

KFXL-TV (channel 51) is a television station in Lincoln, Nebraska, United States, serving as the Fox affiliate for southern and central Nebraska, including Hastings, Kearney, and Grand Island. The station is owned by the Sinclair Broadcast Group alongside the Nebraska Television Network (NTV), the ABC affiliate for the western portion of the Lincoln–Hastings–Kearney market, and is also broadcast as a subchannel of the NTV stations in Kearney, Hayes Center, and McCook. The two stations share studios on Nebraska Highway 44 in Axtell, about 14 miles (23 km) south of Kearney; KFXL-TV's transmitter is located on Yankee Hill Road in southeast Lincoln.

Five applicants sought channel 51 in Lincoln, with World Broadcasting, a subsidiary of the Omaha World-Herald newspaper, emerging as the permittee in 2003. KFXL-TV went on the air in 2006 as KOWH, an affiliate of The WB. Pappas Telecasting, the then-owner of NTV, provided services. It was earmarked to switch to The CW and changed its call sign to KCWL-TV. In June 2009, KCWL-TV simultaneously converted from analog to digital broadcasting and from The CW to Fox, gradually replacing KTVG-TV and KSNB-TV as the Fox affiliate. Pappas acquired the station outright in 2014 before KFXL and NTV were sold at auction to Sinclair in 2015. The station airs a weeknight 9 p.m. newscast produced by NTV.

== History ==
=== Establishment and WB/CW affiliation ===
In 1996, World Broadcasting, Incorporated, a subsidiary of the Omaha World-Herald newspaper, applied to the Federal Communications Commission (FCC) seeking approval to build a station on channel 51 in Lincoln. It expected to involve Pappas Telecasting in the operation of the new station. The two open ultra high frequency (UHF) channels in Lincoln, channels 45 and 51, had each received multiple applications. In the case of channel 51, World Broadcasting was competing with Anthony J. Fant, who at the same time was in the process of selling the Nebraska Television Network (NTV) to Pappas. By 1999, the field of applicants for channel 51 had grown to five with David M. Comisar, Prime Broadcasting Company, and Lincoln 51 LLC filing proposals. The FCC granted World Broadcasting the construction permit in 2003, three years after the five applicants had reached a joint settlement agreement; the FCC at one point had dismissed World's application on technical grounds related to interference to new Class A stations but reinstated the application.

World then intended to transfer the license to CFM Communications, a company owned by Carol Miller, which would contract with Pappas for construction, sales, and programming services. The FCC initially approved the deal in 2005, over the objections of Gray Television (owner of the region's CBS affiliate, KOLN/KGIN). Gray believed that Pappas would continue to exercise de facto control over the station under CFM ownership. However, weeks later, the FCC rescinded this approval. This occurred after Mitts Telecasting, owner of Pappas-managed KXVO in Omaha, filed with the FCC the transcript of a deposition made by Miller in a lawsuit involving CFM and Mitts. In a letter, the head of the FCC Media Bureau's Video Division noted, "[T]he sworn statements made by Ms. Miller in her deposition raise serious questions regarding the truthfulness of representations made in CFM's application to acquire Lincoln [Broadcasting, a subsidiary holding the channel 51 permit] from World [Broadcasting]".

KFXL signed on June 26, 2006, as KOWH, an affiliate of The WB Television Network. The station derived its call sign from the World-Herald; the newspaper outsourced most of the station's operations to Pappas, which provided marketing, sales and programming services to the station. Before KOWH signed on, The WB was seen either via KXVO in Omaha or a cable-only WB 100+ station, "KWBL", which Pappas operated alongside NTV. KOWH also used the WB 100+ service.

Five months before KOWH's sign-on, The WB and UPN had announced that they would close and form The CW Television Network. Pappas had obtained the affiliation for KOWH by the time it signed on, and to reflect this affiliation, the station changed its call sign to KCWL-TV on August 1, 2006. KCWL operated as a member of The CW Plus, successor of The WB 100+. On September 1, 2006, KCWL was added to the primary cable system in Lincoln, Time Warner Cable, on channel 18 in their low basic cable tier.

Because it was granted an original construction permit after the FCC finalized the digital television allotment plan on April 21, 1997, the station did not receive a companion digital channel. It was thus required to flash-cut to a digital signal when analog broadcasting formally ended on June 12, 2009.

=== Switch to Fox ===
On June 3, 2009, Pappas Telecasting announced that KCWL would drop its CW affiliation upon the shutdown of the analog transmitter, leaving the Lincoln–Hastings–Kearney market without an over-the-air CW station. The station turned off its analog signal on June 9. When it returned as a digital-only station on June 12, it did so as Fox affiliate KFXL-TV, airing the same programming as KTVG-TV (channel 17) and KSNB-TV (channel 4). The primary Fox affiliate on Lincoln cable systems was Pappas-owned KPTM in Omaha, though KSNB-TV also operated two analog translators in Lincoln and had been added to the Time Warner Cable lineup in 2003 because of its secondary carriage of UPN programming. Steve Harry, general manager of NTV/KFXL, stated that the move was made to increase viewership of his station due to most viewers in Lincoln choosing KXVO, which Time Warner Cable had continued to carry, for CW programming. It also had been a longstanding ambition of Pappas, since the late 1990s, to build a full-power Fox station in Lincoln. KPTM continued to be carried in high definition by Time Warner Cable until 2012.

The launch of KFXL kickstarted a year in which Fox programming moved from all of its prior major transmitters. The new KFXL was added as a subchannel to the two high-power NTV stations, KHGI-TV in Kearney and KWNB-TV in Hayes Center. KSNB-TV and its Lincoln translators left the air on December 1, 2009, after Pappas terminated the time brokerage agreement with KSNB-TV owner Colins Broadcasting Corporation; KTVG-TV left the air on April 5, 2010.

On June 9, 2010, KFXL-TV was purchased from the World-Herald by T. Stanley Trapp of Visalia, California, in a $300,000 deal first reached in December 2006 but not approved until March 30, 2010.

Originally broadcast on channel 51, KFXL-TV received approval to switch to channel 15 in 2012 as part of a proposed facility improvement. Channel 51 was already being sunsetted to reduce interference to telecommunications users. While an upgrade of the signal to the maximum power of 1,000 kW was originally proposed, this was changed to a small power increase (to 21.5 kW) before a license to cover the channel change was requested in November 2014.

Trapp agreed to sell the station to Pappas outright for $300,000 on October 30, 2014; in the filing with the FCC, Pappas stated that KFXL's signal did not significantly overlap the signal of KHGI-TV. In August 2015, the liquidating trust for Pappas announced that it was soliciting bids for a bankruptcy auction of the company's central Nebraska stations, which took place on October 27, 2015. Of the four companies that participated in the auction, Sinclair Broadcast Group emerged as the winning bidder and announced on November 4, 2015, that it had agreed to purchase NTV and KFXL for $31.25 million. The sale was completed on May 1, 2016.

The tower in north Lincoln that housed KFXL-TV's antenna collapsed on October 20, 2017. Reduced-power operation from a new site began on January 12, 2018.

== Newscasts ==
KFXL airs a 9 p.m. newscast produced by NTV.

== Subchannels ==
KFXL-TV's transmitter is located on Yankee Hill Road in southeast Lincoln. Its signal is multiplexed:

Subchannels of KFXL-TV
Subchannel	Res.	Short name	Programming
51.1	720p	FOX	Fox
51.2	480i	ROAR	Roar
51.3	480i	Charge!	Charge!
