= Charge! (TV network) =

American digital multicast television network

- Type: Digital broadcast television network
- Country: United States
- Broadcast area: Nationwide, via OTA digital TV (coverage 82.99%), Stremium, and Stirr.
- Affiliates: List of Charge! affiliates
- Headquarters: Hunt Valley, Maryland

Programming
- Language: English
- Picture format: 1080p (HDTV master feed); (otherwise 480i SDTV widescreen on subchannel affiliates)

Ownership
- Owner: Sinclair Broadcast Group
- Parent: Sinclair Television Group, Inc.
- Key people: David Amy (vice chairman, Sinclair Broadcast Group); Christopher Ripley; (president/CEO, Sinclair Broadcast Group)
- Sister channels: Comet; ROAR; Tennis Channel; The Nest

History
- Launched: February 28, 2017; 9 years ago
- Replaced: The Works

Links
- Webcast: Watch live
- Website: watchcharge.com

Charge! is an American digital broadcast television network owned by the Sinclair Broadcast Group that airs action and adventure-based programming. It launched on February 28, 2017, and was originally a joint venture with MGM.

In addition to its broadcast network affiliates, Charge is also available through its website and apps.

== History ==
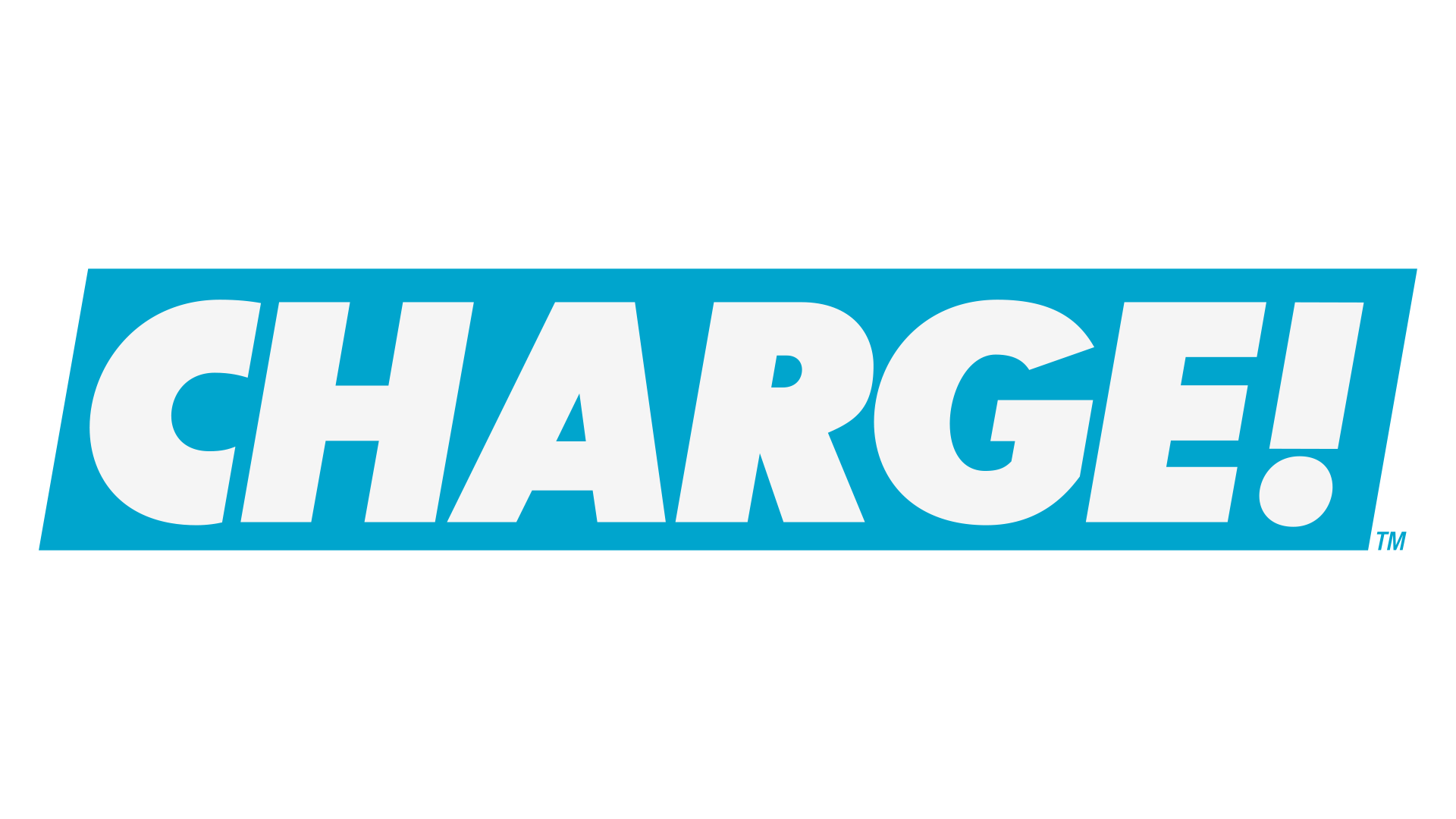
The former logo for Charge!, used from February 28, 2017 to April 2, 2020.

Since 2014, Sinclair had launched several digital broadcast networks, or "diginets"; including the American Sports Network (formally Sinclair's sports programming arm which became the framework for Stadium), and TBD (which targets millennial audiences). The science-fiction network Comet, launched in October 2015, was Sinclair's first joint venture with MGM. Charge! was formally announced by Sinclair and MGM on January 17, 2017.

The network debuted on February 28, 2017, at 10 am (ET) with an airing of the 1978 film Here Come the Tigers. Stations carrying The Works replaced the network with Charge.

Ring of Honor Wrestling, the weekly professional wrestling television series produced by the then-Sinclair-affiliated Ring of Honor, was syndicated on the network from July 9, 2017, to 2019. The series was previously syndicated to Comet.

In 2020, MGM sold their operation stake in Charge and Comet to Sinclair.

== Programming ==
Charge! currently provides up to 19 hours of programming to its owned-and-operated and affiliated stations on weekdays from 8:00 a.m. to 3:00 a.m. Eastern Time and weekends from 12:00 p.m. to 3:00 a.m. Eastern Time. The remaining vacated hours are occupied by paid programming.

Programming on Charge! was originally sourced from MGM's library, and was expressed by Sinclair's press release announcing the launch as "one of the deepest libraries of premium action-themed content in the world." Launch titles indicated included the TV series In the Heat of the Night and The Magnificent Seven, the Rocky and James Bond film series, and other motion pictures including Platoon and Dances with Wolves. As a result, the network has a similar demographic to that of Heroes & Icons and Start TV.

On April 6, Charge! began airing Magnum, P.I. and Knight Rider. In the Fall, Charge began airing Hunter.

In the years since Sinclair took control of the network, Charge would begin acquiring more contemporary crime dramas; including CSI: Miami in June 2021, CSI: NY in late 2022, Without a Trace and Law & Order: Criminal Intent in 2023, Homicide: Life on the Street and Criminal Minds in 2025, and The District in 2026.

=== Current programming ===
- National Wrestling Alliance
- Criminal Minds
- CSI: Miami
- CSI: NY
- The District
- Homicide: Life on the Street
- Law & Order: Criminal Intent

=== Former programming ===
- CHiPs
- The Commish
- Hunter
- In the Heat of the Night
- Knight Rider
- The Magnificent Seven
- Magnum, P.I.
- Walker, Texas Ranger
- Without a Trace

== Affiliates ==
At its outset, Sinclair slated the launch of Charge! to primarily take place on digital subchannels of stations it owns or operates. Other Sinclair stations will likely add Charge! during Spring 2017 (and also used it to replace Grit and Ion Mystery when their carriage agreements with Sinclair expired in January 2018), and Sinclair will continue to offer the network to stations outside its geographic footprint (the company projects Charge to reach over 50% of the U.S. by the end of 2nd quarter 2017). As of February 12, 2019, there are 56 affiliates of which 49 have the network on the air and 7 that have committed to broadcasting the network. It was announced that YouTube TV will add Charge! to their lineup on June 1, 2023.

It is also available on the third digital subchannel on all ABC stations owned by ABC Owned Television Stations, which includes Fresno, Los Angeles, San Francisco, Chicago, New York City, Raleigh, Philadelphia, and Houston.
