= Mass media in Kearney, Nebraska =

Kearney, Nebraska is a center of media in south-central Nebraska. The following is a list of media outlets in the city.

== Print ==
=== Newspapers ===
The Kearney Hub is the city's primary newspaper, published six days per week. In addition, the University of Nebraska at Kearney publishes a weekly student newspaper, The Antelope.

== Radio ==
In its Fall 2013 ranking of radio markets by population, Arbitron ranked the Grand Island-Kearney-Hastings market 251st in the United States.

The following is a list of radio stations licensed to and/or broadcasting from Kearney:

=== AM ===
Frequency	Callsign	Format	City of License	Notes
1340	KGFW	News/Talk	Kearney, Nebraska	-
1460	KXPN	Sports	Kearney, Nebraska	Satellite station of KICS, Hastings, Nebraska

=== FM ===
Frequency	Callsign	Format	City of License	Notes
89.7	K209CF	Religious	Kearney, Nebraska	BBN; Translator of WYFG, Gaffney, South Carolina
91.1	KLPR	Alternative Rock	Kearney, Nebraska	University of Nebraska at Kearney college radio
98.9	KKPR-FM	Classic Hits	Kearney, Nebraska	-
99.9	K260AF	Christian Contemporary	Kearney, Nebraska	Translator of KROA, Grand Island, Nebraska
102.3	KRNY	Country	Kearney, Nebraska	-
105.9	KQKY	Top 40	Kearney, Nebraska	-
106.9	K295BI	Ag News-Talk	Kearney, Nebraska	Translator of KRVN-AM, Lexington, Nebraska

== Television ==
Kearney is a principal city of the Lincoln-Hastings-Kearney television market. The market includes the central portion of Nebraska as well as several counties in north-central Kansas.

The following is a list of television stations that broadcast from and/or are licensed to the city.

Display Channel	Network	Callsign	City of License	Notes
13.1	ABC	KHGI-TV	Kearney, Nebraska	Broadcasts from studios near Axtell, Nebraska
13.2	FOX	KHGI-TV	Kearney, Nebraska	Simulcast of KFXL-TV
