= Mass media in McCook, Nebraska =

McCook, Nebraska is a center of media in southwestern Nebraska. The following is a list of media outlets in the city.

== Print ==
=== Newspapers ===
The McCook Daily Gazette is the city's newspaper, published five days a week.

== Radio ==
The following is a list of radio stations licensed to and/or broadcasting from McCook:

=== AM ===
| Frequency | Callsign | Format | City of License | Notes |
|---|---|---|---|---|
| 1300 | KBRL | News/Talk | McCook, Nebraska | - |
| 1360 | KNGN | Religious | McCook, Nebraska | - |

=== FM ===
| Frequency | Callsign | Format | City of License | Notes |
|---|---|---|---|---|
| 93.9 | KSWN | Top 40 | McCook, Nebraska | - |
| 95.3 | K237DV | Christian Contemporary | McCook, Nebraska | Translator of KGCR, Goodland, Kansas |
| 96.1 | KICX-FM | Adult Contemporary | McCook, Nebraska | - |
| 101.1 | KFNF | Country | Oberlin, Kansas | Broadcasts from McCook |
| 102.1 | KZMC | Classic Country | McCook, Nebraska | - |
| 103.9 | KQHK | Classic rock | McCook, Nebraska | - |
| 105.3 | KIOD | Country | McCook, Nebraska | - |

== Television ==
McCook lies within the Lincoln-Hastings-Kearney television market.

The following is a list of television stations that broadcast from and/or are licensed to the city.

| Display Channel | Network | Callsign | City of License | Notes |
|---|---|---|---|---|
| 6.1 | ABC | KWNB-LD | McCook, Nebraska | Satellite station of KHGI-TV, Kearney, Nebraska |
| 6.2 | FOX | KWNB-LD | McCook, Nebraska | Simulcast of KFXL-TV |
| 8.1 | NBC | KSNK | McCook, Nebraska | Satellite station of KSNW, Wichita, Kansas; broadcasts from studios near Oberlin, Kansas |
| 8.2 | Telemundo | KSNK | McCook, Nebraska | Satellite station of KSNW, Wichita, Kansas; broadcasts from studios near Oberlin, Kansas |
| 44.1 | PBS | K44FN-D | McCook, Nebraska | Translator station of KUON, Lincoln, Nebraska |
| 44.2 | World | K44FN-D | McCook, Nebraska | Translator station of KUON, Lincoln, Nebraska |
| 44.3 | KFXL | K44FN-D | McCook, Nebraska | Translator station of KUON, Lincoln, Nebraska |
