= Mass media in Hastings, Nebraska =

Hastings, Nebraska, is a center of media in south-central Nebraska. The following is a list of media outlets in the city.

== Print ==
=== Newspapers ===
The Hastings Tribune is the city's newspaper, published six days a week.

== Radio ==
In its Fall 2013 ranking of radio markets by population, Arbitron ranked the Grand Island-Kearney-Hastings market 251st in the United States.

The following is a list of radio stations licensed to and/or broadcasting from Hastings:

=== AM ===
Frequency	Callsign	Format	City of License	Notes
1230	KHAS	Adult Contemporary	Hastings, Nebraska	-
1550	KICS	Sports	Hastings, Nebraska	ESPN Radio

=== FM ===
Frequency	Callsign	Format	City of License	Notes
88.1	KCNT	Top 40	Hastings, Nebraska	Central Community College college radio
89.1	KHNE-FM	Public	Hastings, Nebraska	NPR; Satellite station of KUCV, Lincoln, Nebraska
89.9	KCVG	Alternative Rock	Hastings, Nebraska	Hastings College college radio
90.3	K212GI	Christian Contemporary	Hastings, Nebraska	K-LOVE
91.7	K219BW	Religious	Hastings, Nebraska	AFR; Translator of WAFR, Tupelo, Mississippi
94.5	KLIQ	Adult Contemporary	Hastings, Nebraska	-
98.3	KHPJ-LP	Religious	Hastings, Nebraska	3ABN Radio
99.9	K260BK	Religious	Hastings, Nebraska	BRN; Translator of KCVN, Lexington, Nebraska
101.5	KROR	Classic Rock	Hastings, Nebraska	Broadcasts from Grand Island, Nebraska
104.3	K282BE	Religious	Hastings, Nebraska	Translator of KQQA, Shelton, Nebraska

== Television ==
Hastings is a principal city of the Lincoln-Hastings-Kearney television market. The market includes the central portion of Nebraska as well as several counties in north-central Kansas.

The following is a list of television stations that broadcast from and/or are licensed to the city.

Display Channel	Network	Callsign	City of License	Notes
4.1	NBC	KSNB-TV	Superior, Nebraska	Broadcasts from studios near Hastings
4.2	MyNetworkTV/Me-TV	KSNB-TV	Superior, Nebraska	Broadcasts from studios near Hastings
29.1	PBS	KHNE-TV	Hastings, Nebraska	Satellite station of KUON, Lincoln, Nebraska
29.2	World	KHNE-TV	Hastings, Nebraska	Satellite station of KUON, Lincoln, Nebraska
29.3	Create	KHNE-TV	Hastings, Nebraska	Satellite station of KUON, Lincoln, Nebraska
