= Bill Milldyke =

American broadcast journalist, foreign correspondent, and television executive

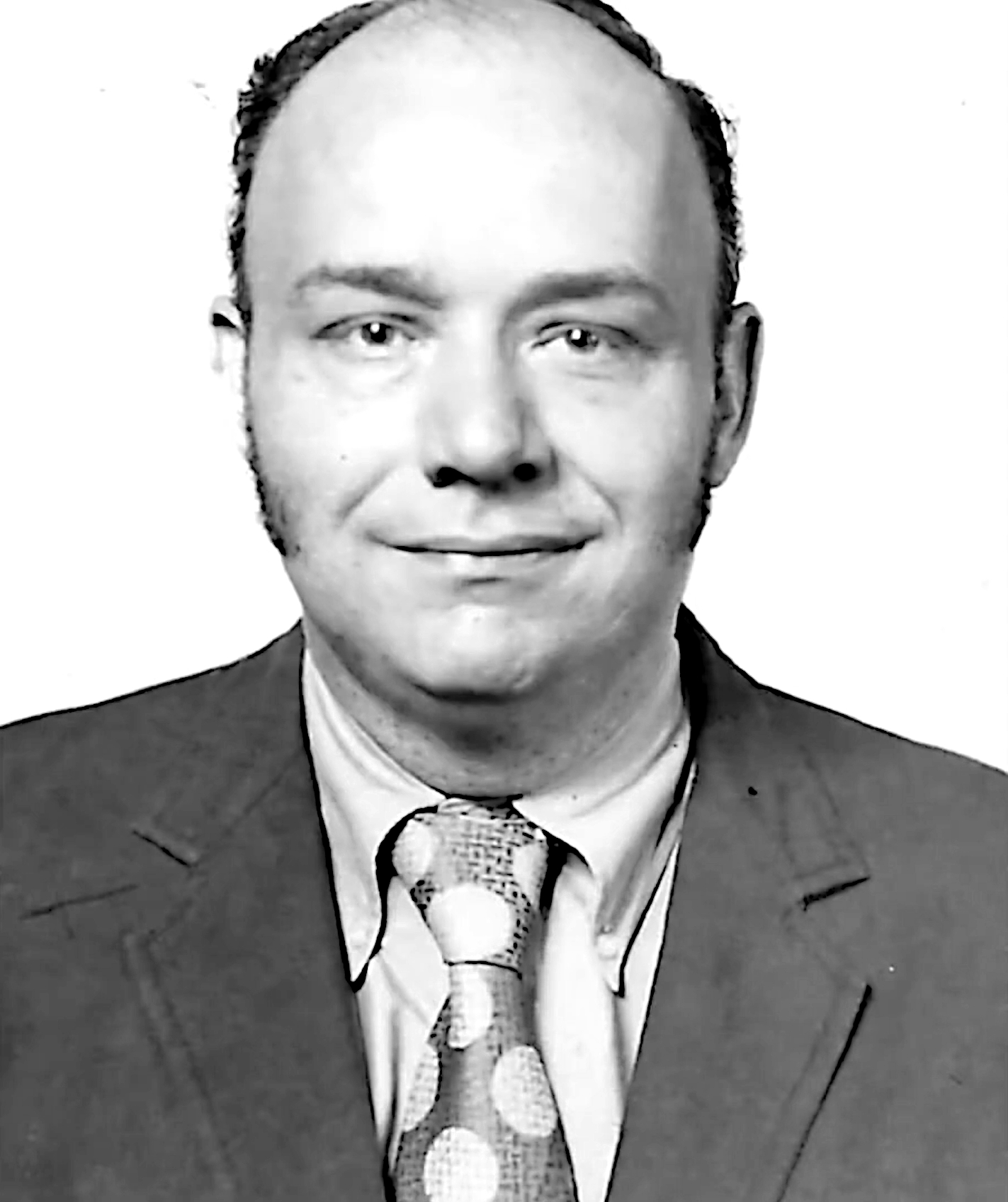
- Born: April 10, 1937; Kearney, Nebraska
- Died: October 26, 1983 (aged 46); London, England
- Resting place: Kearney, Nebraska
- Citizenship: American
- Education: University of Nebraska at Kearney; University of Nebraska–Lincoln
- Occupations: Television journalist Director of news coverage for Europe, Africa, and the Middle East
- Years active: 1960 to 1983
- Employer: ABC News
- Spouse: Doris Milldyke (m. 1960)
- Children: 2
- Honours: Nebraska Broadcasters Association Hall of Fame

John William Milldyke Jr. (April 10, 1937 – October 26, 1983) was an American broadcast journalist, foreign correspondent, and television executive who served as director of news coverage for Europe, Africa, and the Middle East for ABC News.

== Early life and education ==
Milldyke was born in Kearney, Nebraska, the only child of John W. Milldyke Sr. and Irene Milldyke (née Dow). He attended Kearney High School, where he was active in speech and debate, as well as drama.

Following graduation, he enrolled at the Nebraska State Teachers College at Kearney (now the University of Nebraska at Kearney, or UNK), where he continued to be active in speech activities and was state champion in the categories of Men’s Open Oratory and, with his teammate Larry Lechner, Men’s Debate. Lechner expressed his esteem for Milldyke in a poem published in The Forensic of Pi Kappa Delta, the journal of the national public speaking honor society, of which Milldyke and Lechner were members:

MY COLLEAGUE
Dedicated to Bill Milldyke

When our case is bad
and I shed a tear,
Who makes my troubles
disappear?
My Colleague.

When life is dark
and victories few,
Who turns my gray skies
into blue?
My Colleague.

When the debate is close
and I need inspiration,
Who leaves to me
the refutation?
My Colleague ! !

— Larry Lechner, Nebraska State, Kearney, The Forensic of Pi Kappa Delta

Milldyke began to explore his interest in broadcasting while at UNK. He helped found and managed the college’s radio station, KOVF, whose programming under his direction included "Women’s Last Word," a program devoted to "women’s news and records submitted by students," which ended each broadcast day. Milldyke also worked for local radio station KGFW and KHOL-TV, part of the Nebraska Television Network.

After completing his undergraduate studies in 1958, Milldyke began graduate coursework at the University of Nebraska–Lincoln (UNL), where he worked for radio stations KFOR and KUON. He also continued to be active in theater, directing a one-act play while he completed his master’s degree in communications.

== Career ==
Following the completion of his studies at UNL, Milldyke spent a year teaching speech and debate at Wayne High School in Wayne, Nebraska, where he coached the school’s debate team.

Milldyke returned to Kearney in 1960 and spent two years serving as the news director for KHGI-TV. In July 1962, he became news director at WOI-TV in Ames, Iowa, where he remained for six years. In addition to his duties at the station, Milldyke taught journalism at Iowa State University, beginning in 1963.

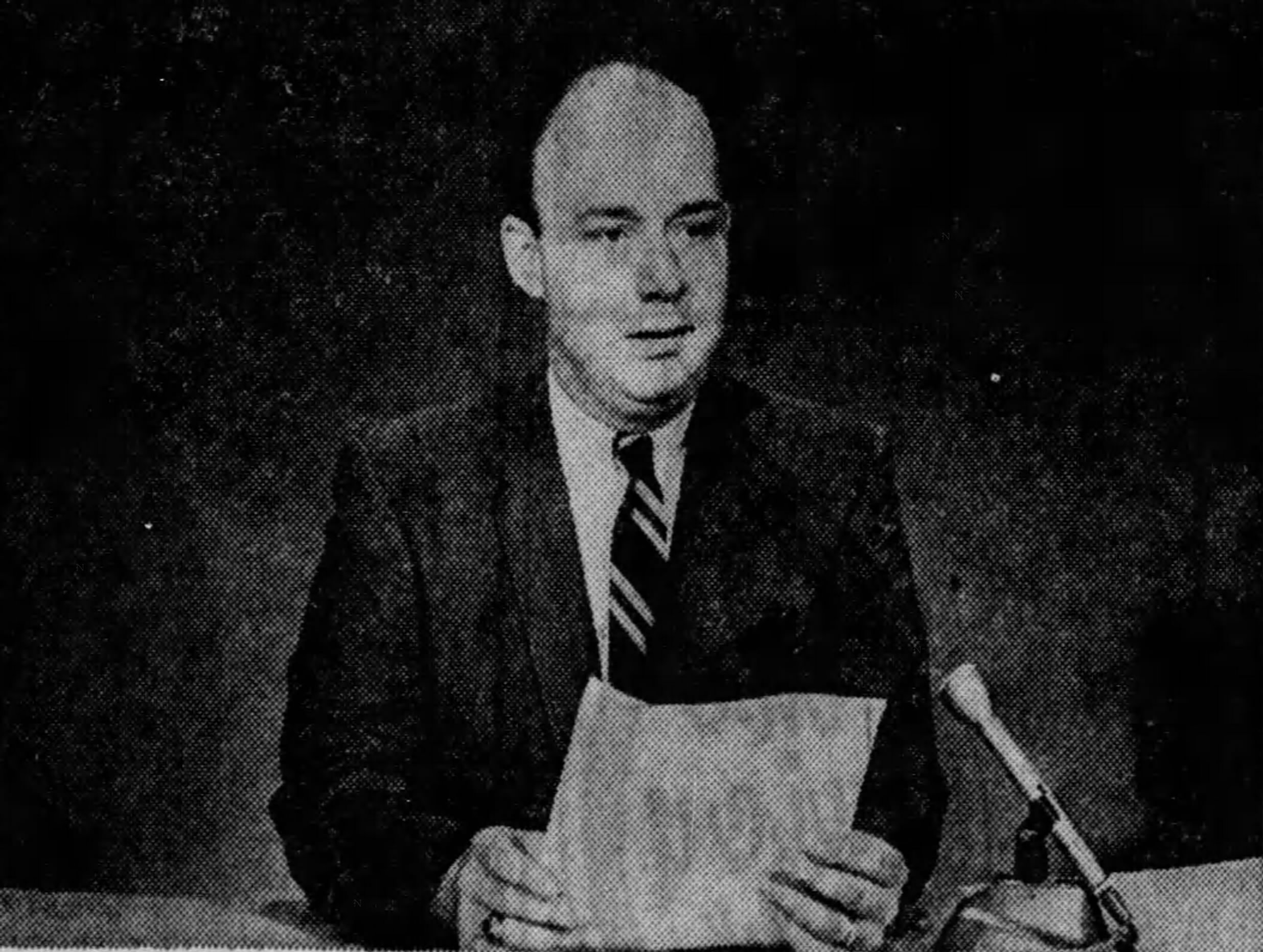
Cropped portion of an advertisement from the August 21, 1967, Des Moines Tribune featuring Bill Milldyke anchoring the 10:00 p.m. newscast on WOI-TV in Ames, Iowa

While at WOI, Milldyke coproduced, along with Jack Belt, news director at WLOS-TV in Asheville, North Carolina, a 30-minute documentary titled "Focus: A Question of Color?" which focused on the efforts of Harvey Gantt, a former student at Iowa State University who sought to integrate Clemson College (now University) by becoming the first African American to enroll there. The documentary, which received praise in the WLOS viewing area, was shown on WOI-TV, with the audio portion subsequently broadcast on WOI radio.

In September 1968, Milldyke accepted a position as an assignment editor with the ABC News Washington Bureau. In 1971, he was assigned as a field producer to the network’s London Bureau, where, in 1977, he advanced to the position of bureau chief and manager of news coverage for Europe. In 1982, he was promoted to director of news coverage for Europe, Africa, and the Middle East. In this capacity, he oversaw the network's news bureaus in London, Paris, Rome, Bonn, Frankfurt, Beirut, Tel Aviv, Jerusalem, and Cairo. He also helped establish the ABC News bureau in Johannesburg.

According to ABC, "Milldyke worked on every major news story of the times: Viet Nam, the Middle East, the Iran hostage crisis, the assassination of Egyptian President Anwar Sadat and the attempted assassination of Pope John Paul II."

Other major news stories Milldyke covered included:

- Paris Peace Accords (1972 and 1973)
- President Richard Nixon’s visit to Egypt and the Soviet Union (1974)
- Apollo-Soyuz mission (1975)
- Helsinki Accords signing (1975)
- Soweto riots (1976)
- Republican and Democratic national conventions (1976 and 1980)
- President Jimmy Carter’s visit to Tehran and Egypt (1977)

In 1974, Milldyke was invited to give a guest lecture as part of the Avery Lecture Series at UNL. He spoke of some of the challenges associated with reporting on events in areas such as the Soviet Union and the Middle East, where political tensions with the United States sometimes hindered American networks' ability to broadcast. "One of the most significant breakthroughs," he said, "was when ABC got President Sadat of Egypt to appear on 'Issues and Answers.' Later we got President Assad of Syria and Israeli Prime Minister Yitzak [sic] Rabin to appear." Milldyke said when it came time to cover Nixon’s visit to the Middle East in 1974, "the Egyptians were most cooperative."

In reporting on the media frenzy surrounding the anticipated release of American hostages from Iran, Newsweek, in its November 10, 1980, issue, said of the media, "They were taking no chances on muffing what ABC’s Bill Milldyke described as 'potentially the biggest U.S. story since the end of Vietnam.'"

Milldyke's work in London was referenced in the 2012 memoir Paris: A Love Story ISBN 978-1451691559, by Kati Marton, who recalled being sent by Milldyke from Paris to Belfast, in Northern Ireland, to cover an Irish Republican Army attack at a dog show.

== Personal life ==
Milldyke was married to Doris "Dori" Milldyke (née Evans). They had two daughters, Sonja and Michelle. During his time working overseas, Milldyke and his family lived in Amersham, England, northwest of London, in a 400-year-old house. The Milldykes had to adjust to life in a foreign country, as they described to the Kearney Hub during a visit to the U.S. in 1978. “Mrs. Milldyke said she thought England was about seven to 10 years behind the States,” the Hub reported, for example. “When the family first moved, there were hardly any frozen foods available.” The article also noted differences in prices between the U.S. and UK. "A pair of name brand jeans can cost up to $30. (Note: According to a June 25, 1979, article in The New York Times, designer jeans two-and-a-half years earlier "sold for about $25 and moreroughly double the $12‐to-$15 price tag on the traditional Levi Strauss, Wrangler, Blue Bell and Lees products." Ettorre, Barbara (1979-06-25). "Status jeans: Lucrative Craze". The New York Times. ISSN 0362-4331.) Appliances are also more expensive and smaller. Mrs. Milldyke said her washer has a capacity of five pounds, compared to 14 in the U.S." As far as work ethic, Milldyke told the newspaper, "We work harder than people in the States," noting that he worked 13-hour days, six or seven days a week. "Mr. Milldyke said there are many advantages to being overseas, including the cultural backgrounds and the quiet way of living," the article added. "He said they have the advantage of being in the city but yet have space."

== Death ==
Milldyke died in a hospital following a heart attack at his home outside London on October 26, 1983, at the age of 46. According to The New York Times, he had hosted a reception for the outgoing U.S. ambassador to the UK John J. Louis Jr. just two days earlier. The following day, he hosted a luncheon for former Prime Minister Harold Wilson. That evening, he attended the opera.

Milldyke's body was returned to the U.S. for his funeral and burial, which took place at Kearney Cemetery. In addition to his funeral, a memorial service for Milldyke was held at All Souls Church in London. More than 700 people attended, including several executives from ABC News in New York.

ABC News President Roone Arledge issued a statement on behalf of the network following Milldyke's death. "For the past decade Bill helped guide the ABC News overseas reporting and operations during a period of extraordinary growth," Arledge said. "He played a vital role in the development of news bureaus and expansion of our foreign news coverage. We are deeply saddened by Bill’s death and send our most sincere condolences to his family."

Reporting on his death on ABC World News Tonight, Peter Jennings reflected on Milldyke's professionalism, resourcefulness, and camaraderie as a journalist. "He was a tireless worker, a man of strict standards," Jennings said. "If we had to broadcast from almost anywhere in the world, Bill always seemed to know how. We worked together for many years. He was a master at handling us all when the chips were down and times were tough. We’ll miss him and we will miss his talents."

== Honors ==
Milldyke was honored in 2021 with induction into the Nebraska Broadcasters Association Hall of Fame. In 1982, he was named among the outstanding alumni of UNK. At the time of his death, he served as president of the Association of American Correspondents in London.
