= Cyrus Allen Black =

Taxidermist, naturalist, minor league baseball player

Cy Allen Black
- Born: December 1, 1871; Woodstock, Illinois, US
- Died: July 3, 1962 (aged 89); Kearney, Nebraska, US
- Known for: Natural history Ornithology; Taxidermy; Baseball
- Spouse: Bessie S. Black (née Snowden)

Cyrus "Cy" Allen Black is best known for his work as a taxidermist and amateur ornithologist around his home in Kearney, Nebraska. After his death, many of his significant ornithological records have been considered suspect, with some of his contemporaries accusing him of fraud. He was also a minor league baseball outfielder between 1904 and 1911.

== Personal life ==
Black was born in Woodstock, Illinois, but moved to Kearney, Nebraska, with his family at a young age. At one point, up to 32 members of his family lived in Kearney, but Black was the only one who remained in Kearney later in his life. His wife, Bessie, served as the registrar for Kearney State Teachers College. He resided at 1404 10th Avenue in Kearney, which was located approximately two blocks away from his family home.

== Career ==
=== Baseball ===
Cy Black played for multiple teams, including the Keokuk Indians (1904, 1907), the Rock Island Islanders (1906), and the Kearney Buffaloes (1911). After finishing his baseball career, he served as a scout and maintained close contacts within the baseball industry.

=== Wildlife career ===
After his baseball career, Black worked as a taxidermist and as a decoy and duck call maker. Black advertised his taxidermy skills locally as early as 1917. Over time, he improved his craft until his decoys were of such high quality that they received nationwide demand, with some selling for as much $36 in 1957 ($306 today). Black recounted selling thousands of decoys during his lifetime. He credited his life-like mounts to having created casts of mounted specimens to get the exact proportions, and then using these casts to create models from which he could create the decoys. His decoys were allegedly so accurate that they would occasionally be attacked by eagles. Other taxidermy specimens of Black's were considered noteworthy in and of themselves, including a bald eagle specimen from "Elmcreek", and many of his specimens still exist today in university and museum bird collections. He also served as an examiner for the taxidermy merit badge for the Boy Scouts in 1929. For many years, he owned a 50 acres (20 ha) plot of land near Oshkosh, Nebraska, where he operated a hunting lodge before selling it in 1956.

Black also made a name for himself in the Nebraska ornithological community, helping confirm identifications of birds from Central Nebraska and relaying sightings on to the ornithological community. He was the president of the Nebraska Ornithologists' Union in 1919 and 1920. Many of his reports are of whooping cranes during a time when this species was near its lowest recorded population, and not all of his records are considered credible. Some of the more notable finds reported by Black include that of a Cape May warbler in Kearney, Nebraska, at the time (1921) the westernmost record in the state, those of nesting western grebes in Garden County in 1916, and the alleged first state record of Bewick's wren also from Garden County, its identity was verified by Harry C. Oberholser, but the specimen cannot now be located and the veracity of this record is considered dubious.

==== Allegations of fraud ====
Despite being considered a talented ornithologist by his contemporaries, many of his records have since been called into question after reports that he fabricated data for specimens acquired in other regions. One such specimen is of a Swainson's warbler (erroneously referred to in the Kearney Hub as "Swanson's Warbler"), which Black allegedly shot in a tree in his yard on April 9, 1905. This particular specimen is from a much earlier date than other vagrants of this species in the Great Plains, and is part of the Albert Brookings's bird collection, now at the Hastings Museum, in which other questionable specimens have been found. Black reportedly sent a Swainson's warbler to C. K. Wothen of Warsaw, Illinois, for confirmation of its identification, but Wothen died shortly after receiving the specimen and his collection was sold. The specimen was eventually located after two years of searching with a "Mr. Brewster of Worcester, Mass." and now resides with the rest of Brooking's collection.
