= KHAS =

- Hastings, Nebraska; United States
- Broadcast area: Grand Island-Kearney, Nebraska
- Frequency: 1230 kHz
- Branding: 1230 KHAS

Programming
- Format: Adult contemporary
- Affiliations: ABC News Radio

Ownership
- Owner: Flood Communications Tri-Cities, L.L.C.
- Sister stations: KICS, KKPR-FM, KLIQ, KXPN

History
- First air date: September 30, 1940
- Call sign meaning: Hastings (named after the Hastings Tribune)

Technical information
- Licensing authority: FCC
- Facility ID: 34487
- Class: C
- Power: 1,000 watts (unlimited)
- Transmitter coordinates: 40°34′40″N 98°24′17″W
- Translator: 104.1 K281CW (Hastings)

Links
- Public license information: Public file; LMS
- Webcast: Listen live
- Website: hastingslink.com

KHAS (1230 AM) is a radio station broadcasting an adult contemporary format. Licensed to Hastings, Nebraska, United States, the station serves the Grand Island-Kearney area. The station is owned by Flood Communications Tri-Cities, L.L.C. and features programming from ABC News Radio.

The station was owned for many years by the family of Fred A. Seaton, which also owned KHAS-TV and still owns the Hastings Tribune newspaper.

Former logo
