= Richard Davenport =

Richard Davenport may refer to:

- Richard Davenport (professor) (born 1946), speech-language pathology professor and university administrator
- Richard Davenport (sprinter) (born 1985), English sprinter
- Richard Alfred Davenport (1777–1852), English miscellaneous writer
- a fictional character
