= KSYZ-FM =

- Grand Island, Nebraska; United States
- Broadcast area: Grand Island–Kearney, Nebraska
- Frequency: 107.7 MHz
- Branding: 107.7 The Island

Programming
- Format: Adult contemporary

Ownership
- Owner: Usher Media Group; (Usher Media, LLC)
- Sister stations: KROR, KRNY, KQKY, KGFW

History
- First air date: 1982

Technical information
- Licensing authority: FCC
- Facility ID: 41878
- Class: C1
- ERP: 100,000 watts
- HAAT: 280 meters
- Transmitter coordinates: 41°9′13.00″N 98°43′38.00″W

Links
- Public license information: Public file; LMS
- Webcast: Listen live
- Website: 1077theisland.com

KSYZ-FM (107.7 MHz 107.7 The Island), is a radio station broadcasting an adult contemporary format. Licensed to Grand Island, Nebraska, the station first went on the air in 1982, serving the Grand Island-Kearney area. KSYZ-FM is owned by Usher Media .

Previous logo
