= KROR =

- Hastings, Nebraska; United States
- Broadcast area: Grand Island-Kearney
- Frequency: 101.5 MHz
- Branding: Classic Rock 101.5

Programming
- Format: Classic rock
- Affiliations: United Stations Radio Networks; Westwood One

Ownership
- Owner: Usher Media Group; (Usher Media, LLC)
- Sister stations: KSYZ-FM, KRNY, KQKY, KGFW

History
- First air date: 1965 (as KICS-FM)
- Former call signs: KICS-FM (1965–1979); KEZH (1979–1998)

Technical information
- Licensing authority: FCC
- Facility ID: 26649
- Class: C
- ERP: 100,000 watts
- HAAT: 306 meters
- Transmitter coordinates: 40°39′28.00″N 98°52′4.00″W

Links
- Public license information: Public file; LMS
- Webcast: Listen live
- Website: rock1015.com

KROR (101.5 FM) is a radio station broadcasting a classic rock format. Licensed to Hastings, Nebraska, United States, the station serves the Grand Island-Kearney area. The station is currently owned by Usher Media. Weekday programming starts with the syndicated Bob & Tom Show in the mornings, Lew from 10A-3P, Jim Cartwright from 3-7PM, and Nights with Alice Cooper.
