= KLIQ =

- Hastings, Nebraska; United States
- Broadcast area: Grand Island-Kearney
- Frequency: 94.5 MHz
- Branding: Fiesta 94.5

Programming
- Format: Regional Mexican

Ownership
- Owner: Flood Communications of Omaha, L.L.C.
- Sister stations: KHAS, KICS, KKPR-FM, KXPN

History
- First air date: 2001
- Former call signs: KBGT (1998–2000, CP)

Technical information
- Licensing authority: FCC
- Facility ID: 541
- Class: C1
- ERP: 100,000 watts
- HAAT: 289 meters

Links
- Public license information: Public file; LMS

KLIQ (94.5 FM) is a radio station broadcasting a Regional Mexican format. Licensed to Hastings, Nebraska, United States, the station serves the Grand Island-Kearney area. The station is currently owned by Flood Communications of Omaha, L.L.C.

== History ==
On May 20, 2022, it was reported that KLIQ will drop its long-time adult contemporary format and "The Breeze" branding on May 23. On that day, at 8 a.m., KLIQ flipped to Regional Mexican, branded as "Fiesta 94.5".
