= George W. Frank House =

Historic house in Nebraska, United States

- U.S. National Register of Historic Places
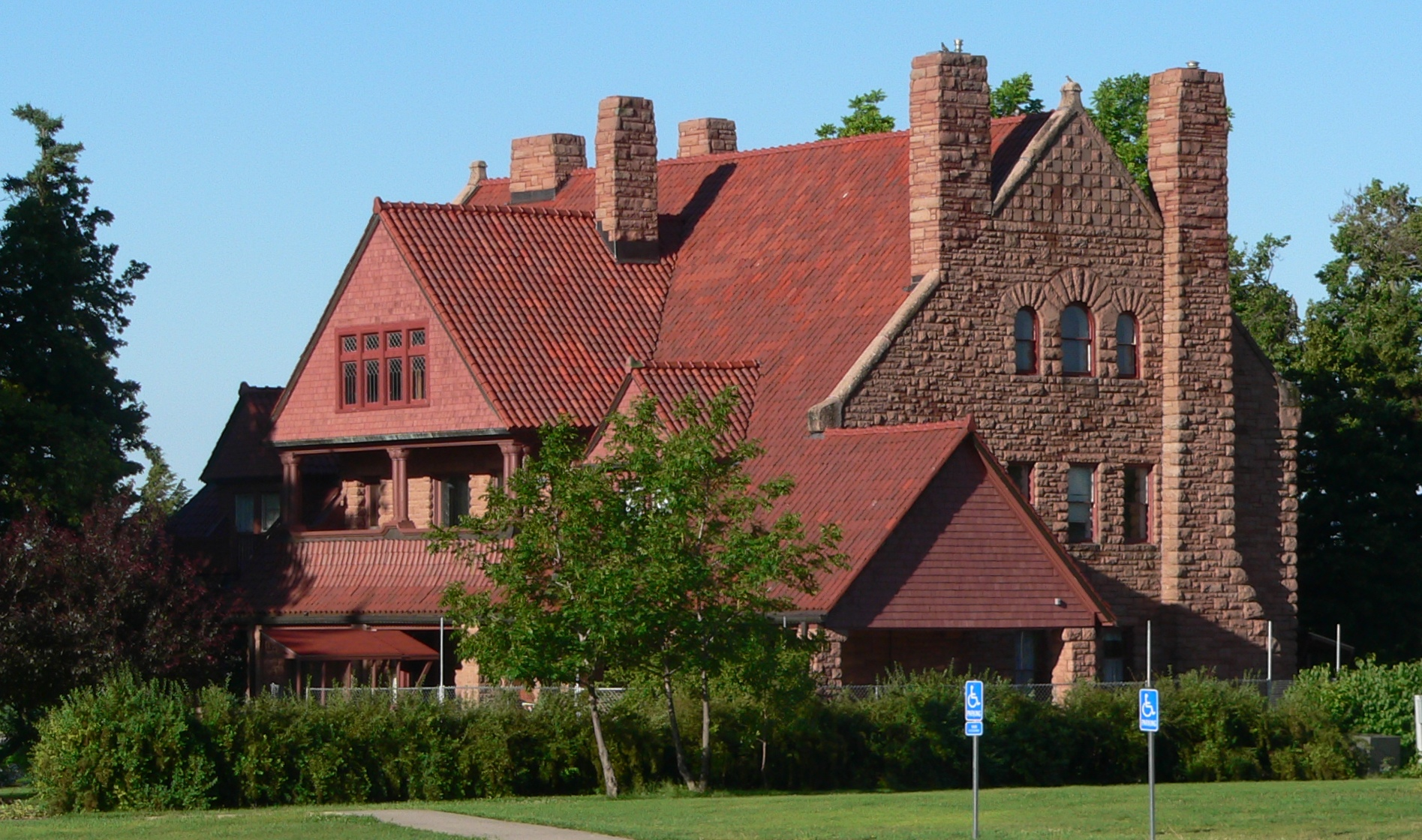
- The George W. Frank House viewed from the northeast

- Location within Nebraska Location within the United States
- Location: University of Nebraska at Kearney, Kearney, Nebraska
- Coordinates: 40°42′3″N 99°6′30″W
- Area: 0.7 acres (0.28 ha)
- Architect: Frank, Bailey & Farmer
- Architectural style: Shingle Style, Richardsonian
- Website: https://frank.unk.edu/frank/
- NRHP reference No.: 73001054
- Added to NRHP: February 23, 1973

The George W. Frank House is a historic mansion located in Kearney, Nebraska, United States. The house was built in 1889 by George W. Frank. Since 1971 the property has been owned by Kearney State College, now the University of Nebraska at Kearney. The university now operates the home as The G.W. Frank Museum of History and Culture. In 1973, the house was placed on the National Register of Historic Places.

== Architecture ==
The Frank House is located in Kearney at 2010 University Drive, on the west end of the University of Nebraska Kearney campus. The house was completed in 1889 at a cost of about $40,000. It was one of the first houses west of the Missouri River to be wired for electricity during the construction of the house. The house is of Richardsonian Romanesque design, with Colorado red sandstone from Wyoming. The exterior stone walls are 18 inches (460 mm) thick, while the interior supporting walls are 14 inches (360 mm) thick and made of brick. The house has 14,000 square feet (1,300 m^{2}) of living space, with three floors and a basement. The Frank House originally had ten fireplaces, seven of which remain. The largest of the fireplaces is located in the drawing room. The extensive interior woodwork is English Golden Oak, done by a local carpenter named John Peter Lindbeck, a certified master carver. Many of his woodcarving designs are repeated elsewhere throughout the interior and exterior of the home as these were the architects only stipulations on what he was to carve.

The grand staircase has six newel posts, each of which has its own design. On the second floor landing is the home's Stained Glass Window, measuring 5 feet (1.5 m) wide and 9 feet (2.7 m) tall, the creator of the window is still unknown and a current research project of the Museum. On the second floor, there were four bedrooms and a bathroom for guests. To fend off cold Nebraska winters, the house was heated by steam heaters located in several rooms throughout the house.

In the dining room, the windows are curved to complement the veranda on the east side of the house.

== Frank family ==
Dr. Augustus Frank was born January 12, 1792, to Andrew and Elizabeth Frank. Frank was born in Germany but immigrated to the United States when he was seven. He trained to be a doctor at a medical college in Dorset, Vermont, and volunteered in the War of 1812. In 1814, Frank began to practice medicine in Victor, New York. He was an abolitionist and a conductor on the Underground Railroad. Frank belonged to the Anti-Slavery Society of New York and the American Anti-Slavery Society.

On September 12, 1816, Frank married Jerusha Baldwin. The couple had three children: two sons who died in infancy, and a daughter, Henriette. On March 15, 1825, Jerusha died. In August of that same year, Frank remarried to Jane Patterson (born August 30, 1795, Londonderry, NH). They had seven children, two of whom were Augustus Frank and George Washington Frank.

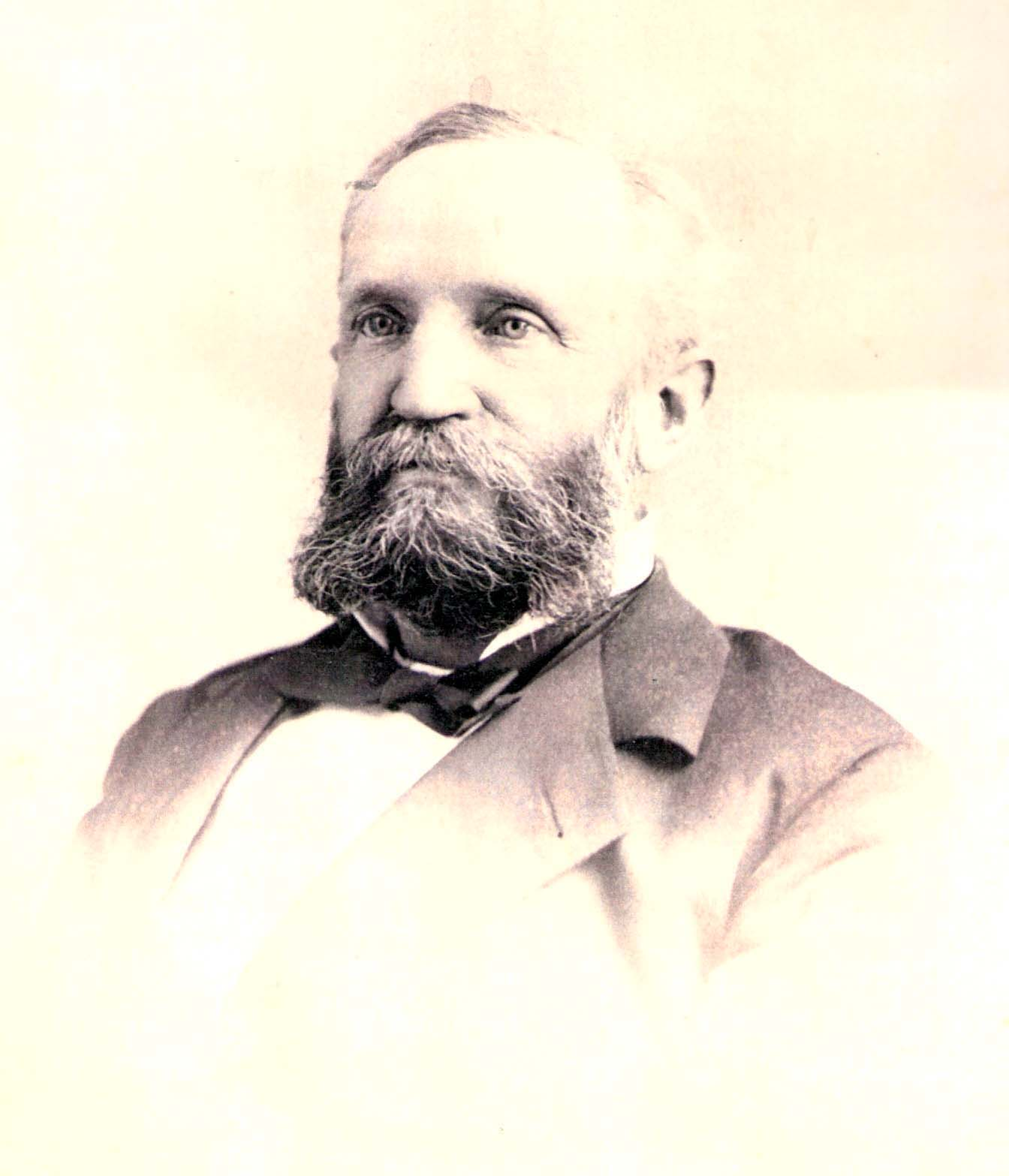
George Washington Frank

== George Washington Frank ==
George Washington Frank was born on November 29, 1830. In 1854, George Frank married Phoebe McNair. They had four children: Sarah (died in infancy), Augustus II, Jeanie, and George William. Phoebe died in February 1900, and George Washington Frank died on March 20, 1906.

Frank built three houses for himself and his family. The first house, completed in June 1869, was built in Warsaw, New York. George Frank built his second house in Corning, Iowa; this second house was called Edgewood. George Frank operated a banking and real estate investment firm in Corning. In the 1990s, after being used as a clubhouse for a local golf course, Edgewood caught fire and was completely destroyed. His Warsaw, NY home still exists today as a private residence. In 1871, he purchased 1,042 acres (4.22 km^{2}) of land from the Union Pacific Railroad in Kearney, Nebraska. He helped establish the Phil Kearney Ranch, where he invested in thoroughbred horses. In 1885, he opened the George W. Frank Improvement Company, and in 1886, began construction on a home in Kearney.

On August 1, 1885, Frank bought the controlling interest in the Kearney Canal and the Water Supply Company. Frank continued the construction of the Kearney Canal and started planning for a power plant in 1885. In July 1890, George Frank owned a company that started using electric trolleys which were run by Kearney Street Railway.

As a result of over-extension in business affairs and the economic turn down caused by the Panic of 1893, Frank lost many of his businesses and was forced into foreclosure. By this point he had signed the house over to his wife for one dollar, as to elude the mortgage broker and keep the home. But by 1900, Phoebe had died of a sudden heart failure and Frank was forced to leave the house to the bank and his possessions up for auction.

Frank moved in with his daughter, Jeanie Frank Elmendorf, who was at that time living in Lincoln, Nebraska, with her husband Charles. Frank died in his sleep at his daughter's home in 1906. He was 76 years old.

== History of the house ==
=== 1886-1900 ===
The house's design was first conceived in 1885 by the architecture firm of Frank Bailey and Farmer. George William Frank, youngest son of George Washington Frank, was in charge of the firm. He designed the house as a gift to his parents. Construction on the house began in 1886 and was completed in 1889. George Washington Frank and his wife Phoebe moved into the home in 1890, possibly waiting for the large stained glass window on the second floor landing to be installed. The main floor of the home includes a Library, Grand Reception Hall, Front Vestibule, Drawing Room, Kitchen, Range Room, Butler's Pantry, Dining Room, two bathrooms, and George and Phoebe's private quarters. Each of these rooms, except the Kitchen, Range Room, and Butler's Pantry, were complete with their own hand carved fireplaces with imported tile from both the Netherlands and New Jersey. The house was the first west of the Missouri River to be wired for electricity during construction. Frank would entertain numerous investors at the house, hoping to draw attention to his businesses and success in Kearney. To draw attention to his success in the generation of hydroelectric power, and his installation of electric streetcars in Kearney, all the light fixtures in the home were based around the incandescent electric light bulb. The light fixtures featured little intricate detail, and even the original dining room fixture was four light bulbs at the end of a wire. While entertaining, the Franks would hire a famous opera singer to sing as the guests were arriving at the house. A harpist would play in the dining room during all of their meals, and an electric buzzer was located under the dining room table to summon servants when the next course for meals needed to be brought to the table. The Library of the house was rarely, if ever, used as a library. George Frank would bring many investors and guests to the room to show them out the window. The large window in the library looked east across the grounds of the house, and one could see Frank's power plant and the skyline of Kearney before the subsequent planting of trees and establishment of the Kearney State Normal School to the east of the house in 1905. Frank used the Drawing Room as his private office and kept a large oak desk in the center of the room, which was eventually taken down to the local pharmacy to pay for medication for Phoebe. The Drawing Room also housed the largest fireplace mantle out of the ten fireplaces located in the home. George and Phoebe's private quarters were also located on the main floor. Private chambers on the main floor of a home were often considered a scandal in the late 1800s, but George and Phoebe were in their late 60's when they moved in and did not want to bother with the stairs. The second floor included numerous guest rooms and a bedroom for the Franks' head cook and chief of staff, Eliza Galloway. Eliza was a freed African American slave from Maryland and had met George Washington Frank's brother Augustus in New York. When Frank lost the house in 1900 he gave his silver and china collections to her to start her own catering company. The third floor was used as servants' quarters, and at its peak would have held an estimated 47 staff members. The basement of the home was originally furnished and was home to a wine cellar, billiards room, and the bedroom of the Franks' coachman, John Dallas Sauders. By 1900, grieving the loss of his wife, and facing financial difficulty brought on by over-extension and the Panic of 1893, Frank was forced to leave the home to the bank.

=== 1900-1907 ===
By 1900, all of the Franks' furnishings were publicly auctioned, including light fixtures. The house changed ownership numerous times according to the Buffalo County Register of Deeds. In 1901 the Camp family purchased the home and lived there until 1906. They often complained that the house had fallen into disrepair, and their daughter continually mentioned in her private diary that the ceilings were leaking and the balconies were too structurally unsound to use. By 1906 the Camps had left and the house again cycled through owners until 1907.

=== 1907-1911 ===
In 1907 the home was purchased for $16,000 by Ole and Georgina Grothan. They began the hefty process of renovating the home to fit the needs of a private medical clinic and sanitarium, known as The Kearney New Sanitarium, that was located on the second floor of the home. The tile roof was replaced, along with gas lines that ran throughout the house. The Drawing Room was converted to be used as a waiting room for patients, and a large leaded glass window on the south wall of the room was replaced with glass french doors which still exist in the room today. The Grand Reception Hall was split in half by a wall to provide more privacy to the Grothans' living quarters. Ole was not only a doctor, but a state senator. Ole and Georgina were unable to have children but did eventually end up adopting a daughter. In July 1911, after marital disputes, the Grothans were divorced and Georgina sold the house to the state of Nebraska for $24,000. Ole attempted to sue for repossession of the home but lost.

=== 1911-1972 ===
In 1911, the Nebraska State Hospital for Tuberculosis was founded and officially opened in 1912. The Frank House's grounds were purchased from the state of Nebraska for $40,000 which included the necessary renovations for the house itself. A 1 1/2-story pavilion was built to the north of the house in 1912 and served as the first hospital building and staff pavilion. In 1914, a much larger brick building was built to accommodate more patients. Today this building is known as the Communications Building on the University of Nebraska at Kearney's West Campus. The Frank House was turned into a staff residence hall, where the medical superintendent was housed on the main floor, the matron, or head nurse, housed on the second floor along with a staff commons area, and various nurses housed on the third floor. Numerous alterations and renovations took place at the house in this period. The house's porte cochere was converted into a two car garage. The back porch of the home was removed and all windows were screened. All five of the chimneys were removed along with the tile roof being replaced with asphalt shingle. The front veranda was filled in with storm windows and turned into living space. Inside, all the walls and much of the original woodwork were painted white to make the house look sterile. The Kitchen and Library were turned into bedrooms and the Franks' private dressing room was converted to be used as a kitchen. On second floor, all woodwork and walls were painted white, followed by the ceilings getting replaced with 1950s acoustic tile. One bedchamber on second floor was converted into two rooms and a hallway and used as apartments. By 1925 a new hospital building known as the East Sun building had been built to the southeast of the Frank House. It went through subsequent additions in the 1930s and 1940s and is today known as West Center, and houses the University of Nebraska at Kearney's Business and Technology Department. George Washington Frank's son Augustus II's home was also purchased and used as a nurse's pavilion. It was torn down in the 1950s to make way for Greer Cottage, present day Welch Hall. With better treatments emerging for Tuberculosis, the hospital's populous began to dwindle to just sixteen patients in 1971. At this point the hospital was ordered to close and officially closed its doors in 1972. The grounds of the hospital were turned over to Kearney State College, now the University of Nebraska at Kearney.

=== 1972-present ===
From 1972 to 1973 the house sat abandoned with nothing but wicker furniture stacked in the Master Bedchamber. In the fall of 1973 Marian Johnson, an elementary music teacher in Gibbon, Nebraska, and her husband Halvin were invited to a luncheon with Kearney State College President MacDonald. The college, he informed them, hoped to save the house. Various groups on campus suggested using the Frank House as a faculty club while others believed it could be adapted as a college dorm. Another proposal called for demolishing the historic building. President MacDonald asked if Marian and Halvin would move in and direct the restoration. He was well aware of a renewed interest in local history, evidenced by Kearney's recent celebration of its 100th birthday in 1973, when the Frank House was utilized as a historic site for the centennial. In this same year, the house was listed on the National Register of Historic Places. On February 1, 1974, the Johnsons hired a mover to relocate them to the second floor of the historic home and begin to run the main floor as a museum. Immediate attention called for the Stained Glass Window to be restored and it was the first restoration project completed at the home. By 1976, the house was officially opened as a museum. The Johnsons left the home in 1990 after living in it and restoring it for sixteen years. Virginia Lund was next to curate the historic house and oversaw the restoration of the Victorian gardens outside the home. In 2006 Virginia retired and curatorship was passed to KrisAnn Sullivan. Sullivan oversaw the completion of the restoration of the master bedchamber and of the northeast bedchamber on second floor. Sullivan also discontinued having the curators live on second floor and opened up the third floor to the public as well. In 2012, Sullivan retired and the house is currently under the management of the Museum of Nebraska Art (MONA), a local art museum that is administratively affiliated with the University of Nebraska at Kearney. As of April 2018 the second, and third floor of the home as well as the basement were opened to the public to see for the first time.

== G. W. Frank Museum of History and Culture ==
In 1973 the Frank House was utilized as a historic center for Kearney, Nebraska's Centennial Celebration. This was the first instance where the house was utilized as a museum. An estimated 2,000 people toured the house during this event. 1973 was the same year that the house was placed on the National Register of Historic Places. In 1976 the Frank House officially opened as a museum after the various areas of the house were partially restored and furniture was collected to fill the empty rooms. Tours were originally only held on the main floor, and visitors would get to travel to the top of the staircase to view the large Stained Glass Window as the curators lived on the second floor of the home. Today, the house not only functions as a museum, but also as a university and community events center. Various events are held at the house, one of the largest being the Chancellor of the university's Holiday Reception. The Frank House also hosts various exhibits presented by community members or exhibits presented by the Frank House.
