= KLPR =

Radio station in Kearney, Nebraska

- Kearney, Nebraska; United States
- Frequency: 91.1 MHz
- Branding: 91.1 The Clear Alternative

Programming
- Format: Alternative

Ownership
- Owner: University of Nebraska at Kearney

Technical information
- Licensing authority: FCC
- Facility ID: 33787
- Class: A
- ERP: 3,800 watts
- HAAT: 36.7 meters (120 ft)
- Transmitter coordinates: 40°42′15″N 99°5′45″W

Links
- Public license information: Public file; LMS
- Webcast: Listen live

KLPR (91.1 FM) is a radio station broadcasting an alternative music format. Licensed to Kearney, Nebraska, United States, the station is owned by the University of Nebraska at Kearney.

== Construction permit ==
On July 28, 2011, KLPR was granted a U.S. Federal Communications Commission construction permit to increase ERP to 3,800 watts and increase HAAT to 36.7 meters.

== See also ==
- Campus radio
- List of college radio stations in the United States
