= Don Welch =

American academic and poet (1932–2016)

Don Welch (June 3, 1932 – August 6, 2016) was an American poet and academic who was born in Hastings, Nebraska. The author of several published poetry collections and a regular contributor to literary magazines, Welch was an English literature professor at the University of Nebraska at Kearney from 1959 to 1997. While there, he was awarded the Distinguished Paul W. Reynolds and Clarice Kingston Reynolds Endowed Chair in English, Poetry & Creative Writing. In June 2001, a bronze sculpture of Welch was finished and dedicated to him on the campus.

Welch spent his early years in the towns of Gothenburg and Columbus. After graduating from Kearney Senior High School in Kearney, he earned a B.A. from the University of Nebraska at Kearney, an M.A. from the University of Northern Colorado, and a Ph.D. from the University of Nebraska. Welch and his wife, Marcia, had five children. He died on August 6, 2016.

== Career ==
Welch's early career was spent teaching English at Fort Morgan High School in Fort Morgan, Colorado, Gothenburg High School in Gothenburg, Nebraska, and at Hastings College in Hastings, Nebraska. Welch held the Reynolds Chair in Poetry at the University of Nebraska at Kearney from 1987 until his retirement in 1997. In retirement he continued to teach courses in the philosophy department at UNK.

Fellow Nebraska poet William Kloefkorn has been quoted as saying, "Don Welch moves among the poor like a modern day Whitman who has mastered the fine art of pruning. ... With a minimum of words he evokes a maximum of feelings and sympathies. The rest of us need the poet's words to bring us those places we have neither the time nor the courage to explore."

== Bibliography ==
- Dead Horse Table. Windflower Press, 1975.
- Handwork. Kearney State College Press, 1978.
- A Shape a Writer Can Contain. (composition handbook) Nebraska State Department of Education, 1979.
- The Rarer Game. Kearney State College Press, 1980.
- On Common Ground. Sandhills Press, 1986.
- The Keeper of Miniature Deer. Juniper Press, 1986
- The King Bird. University of Nebraska at Kearney, 1990.
- The Breeder of Archangels. University of Nebraska at Kearney, 1991
- The Marginalist. Sandhills Press, 1992
- The Platte River. University of Nebraska at Kearney, 1992.
- Four Elemental Odes (in Focus on Creativity). commissioned by The Museum of Nebraska Art, 1992.
- Carved by Obadiah Verity. The Press at Colorado College,1993.
- The Words Which Marry You to Me. University of Nebraska atKearney, 1995.
- The Cranes: A Book of Hours. with Gene Fendt, privately printed, 1996.
- Fire's Tongue in the Candle's End. University of Nebraska at Kearney, 1996.
- Every Mouth of Autumn Says Goodbye. University of Nebraska at Kearney, 1996.
- Wellsprings. with five other Nebraska poets, University of Nebraska at Kearney, 1996.
- A Brief History of Feathers. A Slow Tempo Press, Fall, 1996.
- Never Write in a Glass House. Main-Travelled Roads #9, 1997.
- The Plain Sense of Things. Sandhills Press, 1997
- In the Field’s Hands. privately printed, 1998.
- The Yarn Bin. Sandhills Press, 2001.
- Inklings. Sandhills Press, 2001.
- The Alley Poems. Lone Willow Press, 2002.
- Lives of the Prepositions. privately printed, 2004.
- A Matter of Conjunctions. privately printed, 2004.
- Gutter Flowers. Logan House Press, 2005.
- When Memory Gives Dust a Face. Lewis-Clark Press, 2008.
- Deliberations The Backwaters Press, 2012.

== Awards and honors ==
- Winner of the Teaching Excellence Award of the Board of Trustees of Nebraska State Colleges, 1990.
- The Paul and Clarice Reynolds Distinguished Professor of Poetry, University of Nebraska at Kearney, 1989.
- Winner of the Pratt-Heins Award for Teaching Excellence, 1988.
- The David and Tancie Martin Distinguished Professor of English, University of Nebraska at Kearney, 1981–1989.
- Distinguished Alumni Award, University of NE at Kearney, 1984.
- Nominated 3 times for the Governor's Art Award for work with students in the Nebraska Public Schools
- Winner of The Pablo Neruda Prize for Poetry (judge was William Stafford), 1980.
- Poet-in-residence, University of Nebraska at Kearney, 1979–1997.
- Poet-in-residence for the Nebraska Arts Council, 1975–1988.
- Speech and reading before the Director of the National Endowment for the Humanities, 1995.
- Participant in and consultant to the television documentary "The Last of the Last of the One-Room Schools," Nebraska Public Television, 1995.
- Court of Honor Award for excellence in education and the arts, the Knights of Ak-Sar-Ben, Omaha, NE 1997
- Board of Education, Kearney (NE) Public Schools, 1997–2000.
- Sower Award, The Nebraska Humanities Council, 2004
- The Mildred Bennett Award, The Nebraska Center for the Book, 2004
