= KSWN =

Coordinates: 40.191°N 100.808°W

- McCook, Nebraska; United States
- Broadcast area: McCook, Nebraska
- Frequency: 93.9 MHz
- Branding: 93.9 Jett-FM

Programming
- Format: Contemporary Christian
- Affiliations: Premiere Networks

Ownership
- Owner: Hometown Family Radio; (Legacy Communications, LLC)
- Sister stations: KIOD, KZMC

History
- First air date: September 17, 1998

Technical information
- Licensing authority: FCC
- Facility ID: 70565
- Class: C2
- ERP: 50,000 watts
- HAAT: 150 meters

Links
- Public license information: Public file; LMS
- Webcast: Listen live
- Website: 939jettfm.com

KSWN, carrying the on-air branding of 93.9 Jett-FM, is a Contemporary Christian radio station licensed to and serving the city of McCook, Nebraska and its surrounding area. Previously a Hot AC outlet, it changed formats on June 10, 2011.

On March 2, 2026, KSWN changed their format from Top 40/CHR to contemporary Christian, branded as "93.9 Jett-FM".
