= KRNY =

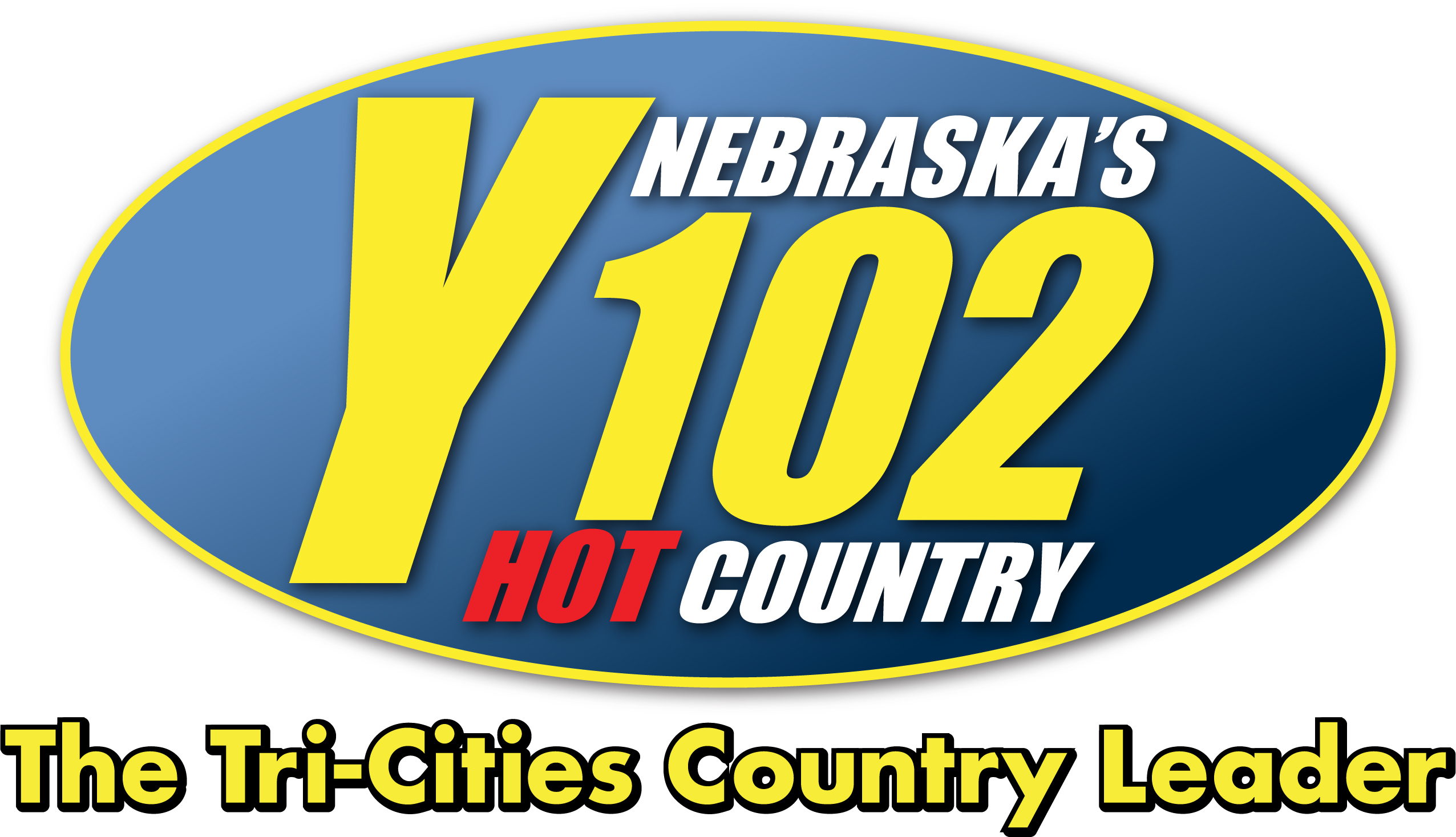
- Kearney, Nebraska; United States
- Broadcast area: Tri Cities, Nebraska (Kearney, Grand Island, Hastings)
- Frequency: 102.3 MHz
- Branding: Y102

Programming
- Format: Country music
- Affiliations: Westwood One

Ownership
- Owner: Usher Media Group; (Usher Media, LLC)
- Sister stations: KSYZ-FM, KROR, KQKY, KGFW

History
- Former call signs: KZBC (1986–1987)
- Call sign meaning: "Kearney"

Technical information
- Licensing authority: FCC
- Facility ID: 47999
- Class: C1
- ERP: 79,000 watts
- HAAT: 331 meters
- Transmitter coordinates: 40°36′8.0″N 98°50′22.3″W

Links
- Public license information: Public file; LMS
- Webcast: Listen live
- Website: krny.com

KRNY (102.3 FM Nebraska's Hot Country Y102) is a country music station in Kearney, Nebraska. The Usher Media operates with an effective radiated power (ERP) of 77.1 kW.
