= Richard Davenport (professor) =

American university administrator

12th President of Minnesota State University, Mankato
- In office July 1, 2002 – June 30, 2021
- Preceded by: Karen Boubel
- Succeeded by: Edward Inch

Personal details
- Born: January 1, 1946 (age 80) Grand Island, Nebraska
- Spouse: Mary Davenport
- Children: Ryan, Natalie
- Education: University of Nebraska at Kearney, Colorado State University, Iowa State University
- Profession: University administrator
- Institutions: Central Michigan University; Western State Colorado University; Winona State University
- Website: Office of the President

Richard W. Davenport (born 1946) is a former speech language pathology professor and university administrator. He was the president of Minnesota State University, Mankato. Davenport led the university through a number of challenges including numerous budget shortfalls in the 2000s, large increases in enrollment during the economic crises of 2007-2010 and through statewide efforts to increase the status of the Minnesota State system.

== Career and background ==
Davenport was the president at a university of approximately 15,000 students, 1,500 staff across 130 collegiate programs. His administration had identified a policy vision that became the university slogan, that is 'going further then you thought possible'. Two major priorities from this vision include increased service to the state, the south central region and the global community as well as further developing graduate research and graduate programs by being a major provider of graduate programs in Minnesota.

He is a board commissioner of the Minnesota Center for Rural Policy and Development which was established by the Minnesota Legislature to develop resources and support the economic development of rural areas across Minnesota. He is also the Chairman of Board of Directors for the Northern Sun Intercollegiate Conference, a member of Greater Mankato Growth, a member of the national American Council on Education and a board member of the American Association of State Colleges and Universities, Council for Advancement.

Prior to becoming the 12th full President of Minnesota State University, Mankato he was provost and vice president for academic affairs at Central Michigan University and Dean of the graduate school and associate vice president for academic affairs at Western State Colorado University. Prior to this he was the tri-college coordinator for Communicative Disorders housed by Winona State University and open to students from Winona State, St. Mary's University of Minnesota and the College of St. Teresa.

Davenport earned a bachelor's degree in speech and hearing disorders at the University of Nebraska at Kearney, a Masters of Science degree in speech and hearing science at Colorado State University, and a doctor of philosophy degree in Higher Education Administration at Iowa State University.

He has two children and is married to his second wife, Mary Davenport, a university professor and formerly the President of Rochester Community and Technical College.

== Research and awards ==
Davenport has worked in teaching in the field of speech language pathology for approximately 30 years. His research focused on the development of partnerships between various health providers and stakeholders. Unrelated to this research he also is an editor of the Rural Minnesota Journal Editorial Committee as part of his role as a board member for the Minnesota Center for Rural Policy and Development. He also developed a new program to teach the Dakota language at the university notable as one of only two programs in the world.

== Controversies ==
The reputation of Minnesota State University was marred by Davenport's administration highly publicized job terminations of well-known employees. The popular aviation department almost imploded after the firing of John Roberts, the head faculty of this program, in 2003, and the subsequent lawsuits against the university for wrongful termination and lost. Roberts, who was a 2014 inductee MN Aviation Hall of Fame, helped build the university's aviation program into one with a national reputation that was home to as many as 300 students at a time.

In 2010, Davenport was involved in the controversial firing of Tonya Phillips, the leader of the College Access Program (CAP). CAP was a bridge program that identified high school students who did not qualify for admission to MNSU, but recognized that, given the proper counseling and tools, they could succeed in college.

In 2012, Davenport was involved in the controversial firing of school Division II Football Coach Todd Hoffner. This event was the result of scandal involving misuse of university phones. Hoffner was later found by a court of law to not have broken any criminals laws and the case against Hoffner was thrown out. After union intervention, President Davenport and Athletic Director Kevin Buisman reinstated Hoffner as head coach of the university football team. This event made state and national news.
