= KIOD =

- McCook, Nebraska; United States
- Frequency: 105.3 MHz
- Branding: Coyote Country

Programming
- Format: Country music

Ownership
- Owner: Legacy Communications, LLC
- Sister stations: KSWN, KZMC

Technical information
- Licensing authority: FCC
- Facility ID: 2119
- Class: C1
- ERP: 100,000 watts
- HAAT: 180 meters (590 ft)
- Transmitter coordinates: 40°11′27″N 100°48′31″W

Links
- Public license information: Public file; LMS
- Website: http://www.coyote105.com/

KIOD (105.3 FM) is a radio station licensed to McCook, Nebraska, United States. The station airs a country music format and is currently owned by Legacy Communications, LLC.
