= KKPR-FM =

Radio station in Kearney, Nebraska

- Kearney, Nebraska; United States
- Broadcast area: Grand Island-Hastings-Kearney area
- Frequency: 98.9 MHz
- Branding: 98.9 The Vibe

Programming
- Format: Classic hits

Ownership
- Owner: Flood Communications Tri-Cities, L.L.C.
- Sister stations: KHAS, KICS, KLIQ, KXPN

History
- First air date: November 1, 1962
- Former call signs: KRNY-FM (1962–1964, 1966–1986); KHOL-FM (1964–1966)
- Call sign meaning: "Power", branding adopted when the station changed call signs in 1986

Technical information
- Licensing authority: FCC
- Facility ID: 52804
- Class: C1
- ERP: 100,000 watts
- HAAT: 191 meters (627 ft)

Links
- Public license information: Public file; LMS
- Webcast: Listen Live
- Website: KKPR Online

KKPR-FM (98.9 MHz) is a radio station broadcasting a classic hits format. Licensed to Kearney, Nebraska, United States, the station serves the Grand Island-Kearney area. The station is currently owned by Flood Communications Tri-Cities, L.L.C.

The station launched in November 1962 as KRNY-FM.

On April 1, 2022, KKPR-FM rebranded as "98.9 The Vibe".
