= KZMC =

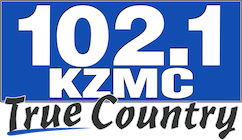
- McCook, Nebraska; United States
- Frequency: 102.1 MHz
- Branding: True Country 102.1

Programming
- Format: Classic Country

Ownership
- Owner: Hometown Family Radio; (Legacy Communications, LLC)
- Sister stations: KIOD, KSWN

Technical information
- Licensing authority: FCC
- Facility ID: 166012
- Class: C1
- ERP: 100,000 watts
- HAAT: 180 meters (590 ft)
- Transmitter coordinates: 40°11′27.00″N 100°48′29.00″W

Links
- Public license information: Public file; LMS
- Website: www.1021kzmc.com/KZMC/index.htm

KZMC (102.1 FM) is a radio station broadcasting a classic country format. Licensed to McCook, Nebraska, United States, the station is currently owned by Hometown Family Radio.

== History ==
On May 30, 2014 KZMC changed their format from active rock (as "Z102.1") to classic country, branded as "True Country 102.1".
