= KXPN (AM) =

- Kearney, Nebraska; United States
- Broadcast area: Grand Island-Kearney
- Frequency: 1460 kHz
- Branding: ESPN Tri-Cities

Programming
- Format: Sports
- Affiliations: ESPN Radio; Westwood One

Ownership
- Owner: Flood Communications Tri-Cities, L.L.C.
- Sister stations: KHAS, KICS, KKPR-FM, KLIQ

History
- First air date: December 1956 (as KRNY)
- Former call signs: KRNY (1956–1986); KKOA (1986–1990); KKPR (1990–2003)
- Call sign meaning: ESPN

Technical information
- Licensing authority: FCC
- Facility ID: 52803
- Class: D
- Power: 5,000 watts day; 56 watts night
- Translator: 92.1 K221GM (Kearney)

Links
- Public license information: Public file; LMS
- Webcast: Listen live
- Website: platteriverradio.com/espn/

KXPN (1460 AM) is a radio station broadcasting a sports format. Licensed to Kearney, Nebraska, United States, the station serves the Grand Island-Kearney area. The station is owned by Flood Communications Tri-Cities, L.L.C. and features programming from ESPN Radio and Westwood One.

The station launched in December 1956 as KRNY.
