= KICS =

Simulcasts KXPN, Kearney, NE
- Hastings, Nebraska; United States
- Broadcast area: Hastings-Grand Island-Kearney
- Frequency: 1550 kHz
- Branding: ESPN Tri Cities

Programming
- Format: Sports
- Affiliations: ESPN Radio

Ownership
- Owner: Flood Communications Tri-Cities, L.L.C.
- Sister stations: KHAS, KKPR-FM, KLIQ, KXPN

History
- First air date: 1964
- Former call signs: KICS (1964–1997); KMEM (1997–1998)

Technical information
- Licensing authority: FCC
- Facility ID: 26651
- Class: D
- Power: 500 watts (day); 27 watts (night)
- Transmitter coordinates: 40°34′03″N 98°22′31″W
- Translator: 92.7 K224FK (Hastings)

Links
- Public license information: Public file; LMS
- Webcast: Listen live
- Website: platteriverradio.com/espn/

KICS (1550 AM) is a radio station broadcasting a sports format. Licensed to Hastings, Nebraska, United States, the station serves the Hastings-Grand Island-Kearney area. The station is owned by Flood Communications Tri-Cities, L.L.C. and features programming from ESPN Radio and Westwood One.

The majority of the programming is simulcast with sister station KXPN in Kearney.

Former logo
