= KQKY =

Radio station in Kearney, Nebraska

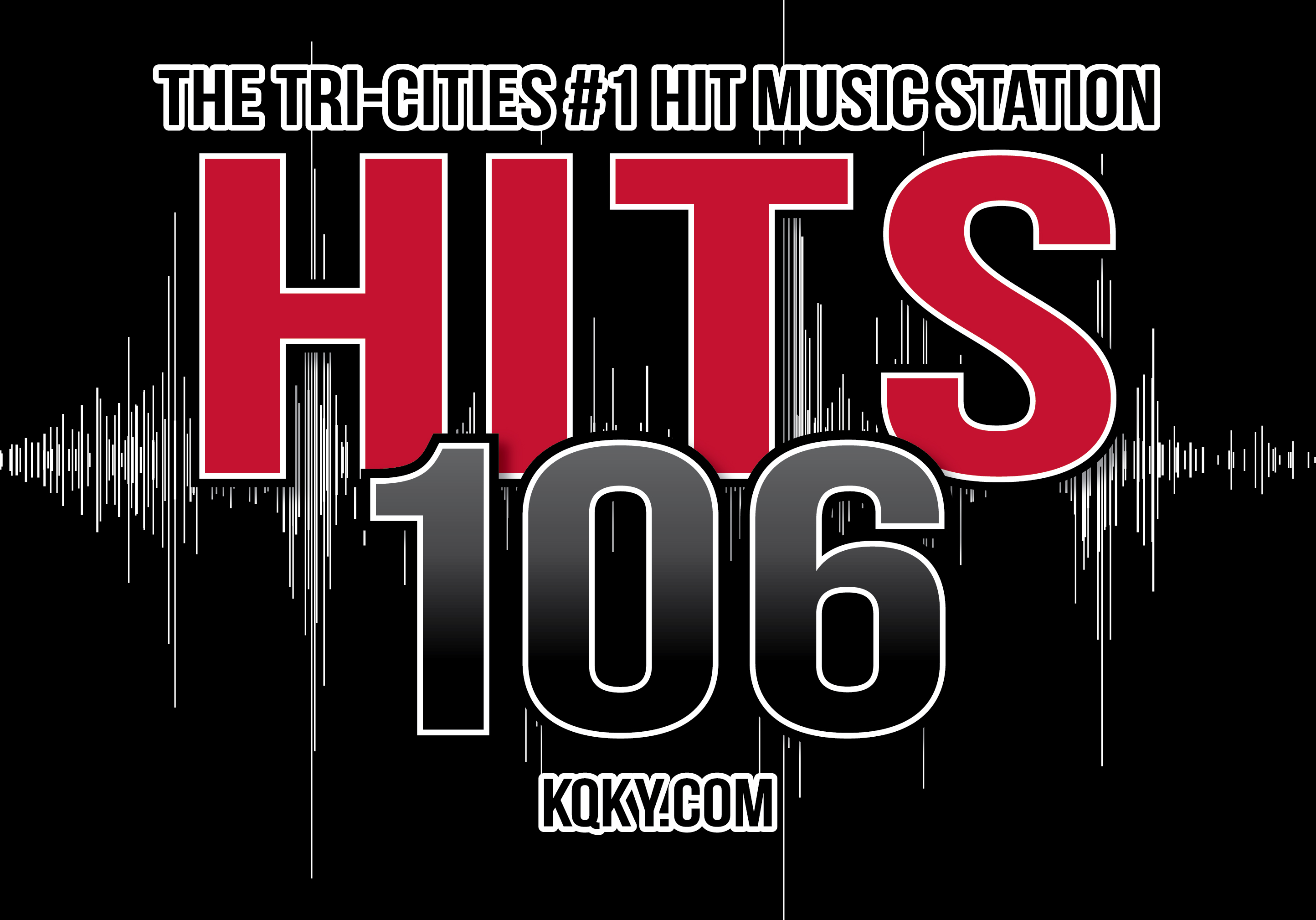
- Kearney, Nebraska; United States
- Broadcast area: Grand Island-Kearney
- Frequency: 105.9 MHz
- Branding: Hits 106

Programming
- Language: English
- Format: Contemporary hit radio
- Affiliations: Compass Media Networks; Nebraska Cornhuskers; United Stations Radio Networks

Ownership
- Owner: Usher Media Group; (Usher Media, LLC)
- Sister stations: KSYZ-FM; KROR; KRNY; KGFW

History
- First air date: October 3, 1979

Technical information
- Licensing authority: FCC
- Facility ID: 9778
- Class: C
- ERP: 100,000 watts
- HAAT: 367 meters (1,204 ft)
- Transmitter coordinates: 40°36′8.00″N 98°50′21.00″W

Links
- Public license information: Public file; LMS
- Webcast: Listen live
- Website: kqky.com

KQKY (105.9 MHz) is a commercial radio station broadcasting a contemporary hit radio format. Licensed to Kearney, Nebraska, United States, the station serves the Grand Island-Kearney area. The station is currently owned by Usher Media. Weekday programming includes Hits 106 Mornings, MidDays with Hammer, Reido on the Radio, The 5 O'Clock Traffic Jam, and overnights syndicated through Liveline with Mason Kelter. Weekend Programming includes Rick Dees Weekly Top 40, The Baka Boyz All Star Hit Mix, SunRise with Kevin Petersen, and Sunday Night Slow Jams on weekends. KQKY is a sister station to KGFW and KRNY.

Former logo
