= Hastings Tribune =

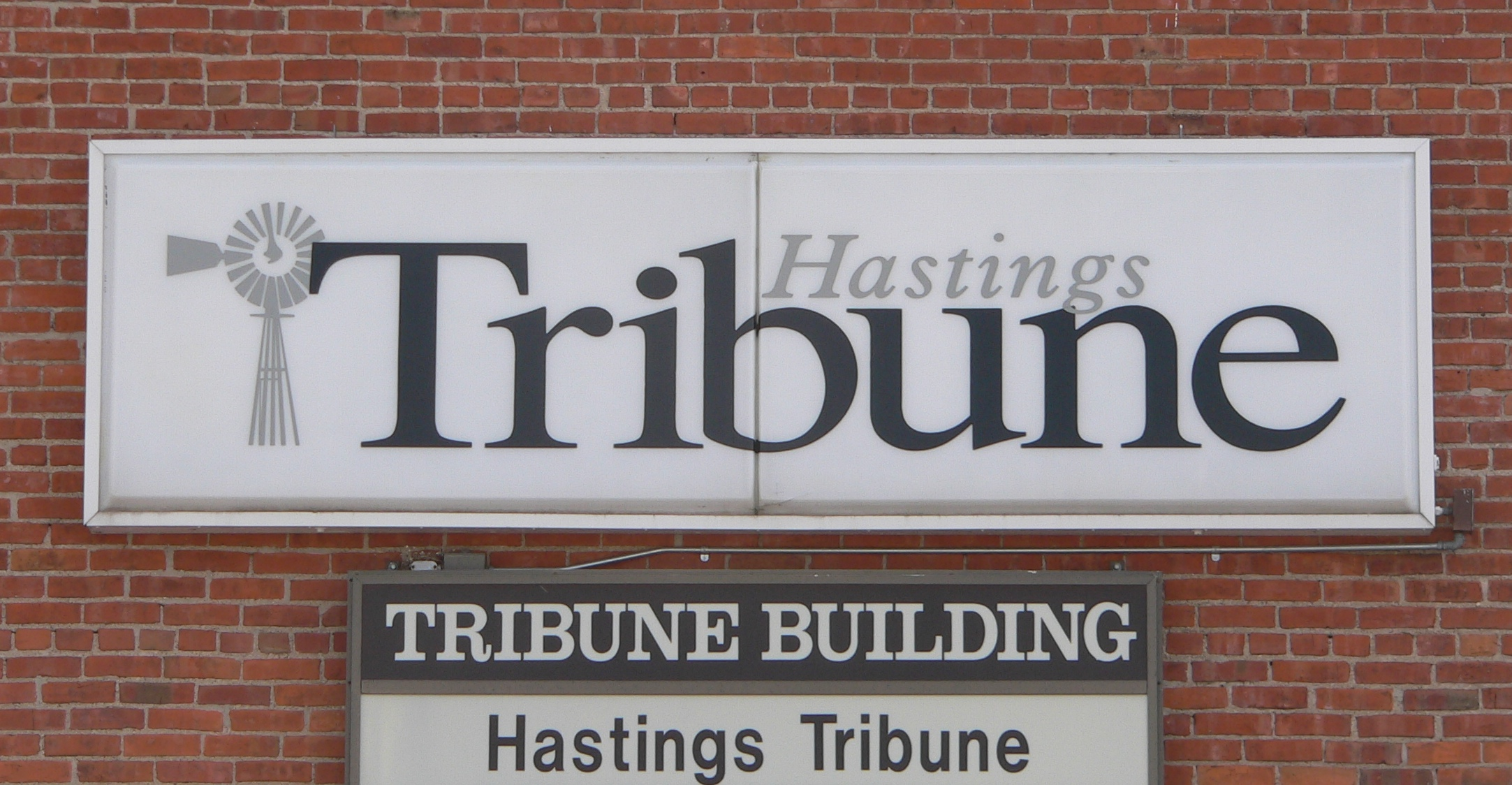
- Type: Daily newspaper
- Format: Broadsheet
- Owner(s): Seaton Publishing Company, Inc.
- Publisher: Darran Fowler
- Editor: Andy Raun
- Language: English
- Headquarters: 912 W. 2nd Street; Hastings, Nebraska 68901; USA
- Circulation: 5,250
- Website: hastingstribune.com

The Hastings Tribune is a newspaper published in Hastings, Nebraska. The newspaper is put out five days a week, Tuesday-Saturday with an e-edition only on Monday. It serves ten counties in south central Nebraska and north central Kansas. In 2011, its circulation was 9,356. Today, it's 5,250.

== History ==
In 1886, Frank D. Taggart founded the Independent, a weekly paper intended to promote the Republican party. At about the same time, A. P. Brown and Dick Thompson founded the weekly Tribune. The two newspapers were purchased and merged by A. H. Brown, who published the combined paper under the name Hastings Independent-Tribune.

In 1894, the newspaper was purchased by Adam Breede, who changed its name to the Hastings Tribune. In 1905, it began daily publication under the name Hastings Daily Tribune; the weekly Tribune continued to be published. A Linotype was acquired in 1907, and a press in 1910; prior to those dates the type had been hand-set and the newspaper printed by the rival Adams County Democrat.

Breede was an active promoter of municipal improvements. He also supported the political career of Hastings resident Charles Henry Dietrich. A lifelong bachelor, Breede left the Tribune in other hands while he acted as a war correspondent during World War I. After the war, he embarked on a big-game hunting expedition to Africa, where he contracted blackwater fever; the aftereffects of this led to his death in 1928.

Henry G. Smith, who had served as managing editor since 1905, took over as editor and publisher upon Breede's death. In 1937, he retired and the newspaper was sold to the Seaton family.

Fay Seaton had owned and published the Manhattan, Kansas Mercury since 1915; later, he had acquired the Manhattan Chronicle. In 1937, he and his sons Fred and Richard bought the Tribune, and Fred was dispatched to Hastings to operate the newspaper.

Fred Seaton had worked on the two Manhattan newspapers since his youth, rising to the position of associate editor of Seaton Publications. He edited and published the Tribune from 1937 until his death in 1974. His residence in Hastings was interrupted by a decade in Washington, D.C., as a U.S. Senator and in a variety of positions in the Eisenhower administration. During his term as editor and publisher, the Tribune became the first Nebraska newspaper outside of the Lincoln-Omaha area to use wirephoto, and the only one to use three wire services. Near the end of his life, he converted the newspaper from letterpress to offset printing.

After Fred Seaton's death in 1974, his son Don Seaton became the publisher of the Tribune. He held the position until his retirement in 2010.

== 21st century ==
Upon Don Seaton's retirement, he was replaced as publisher by Darran Fowler, who had previously served as associate publisher and as managing editor of the newspaper. Stephen Hermann was named managing editor to replace Fowler; he had previously worked at the Omaha World-Herald and at the Lincoln Journal Star, and immediately prior to his appointment at the Tribune had served as director of student publications at Nicholls State University in Thibodaux, Louisiana. Hermann retired after 18 months, and was replaced as managing editor in 2011 by Amy Palser, who had been the Tribune's news director from 2001 to 2005.

The Tribune is published six days a week: (until July 2017) Monday through Friday afternoons, and Saturday mornings. In July 2017, the Tribune began publishing Monday through Saturday mornings, thus the long-standing tradition of afternoon editions ended. The newspaper serves eight counties in south central Nebraska and two in north central Kansas: Adams County, Nebraska, where Hastings is located; Clay, Fillmore, Franklin, Kearney, Nuckolls, Thayer, and Webster counties in Nebraska; and Jewell and Smith counties in Kansas. It also covers small portions of Hall, Hamilton, and Harlan counties in Nebraska.
