= KGFW =

- Kearney, Nebraska, US; United States
- Broadcast area: Grand Island-Kearney
- Frequency: 1340 kHz
- Branding: 1340 KGFW

Programming
- Format: News Talk
- Affiliations: Fox News Radio; Compass Media Networks; Premiere Networks; Westwood One

Ownership
- Owner: Usher Media Group; (Usher Media, LLC)
- Sister stations: KQKY, KRNY, KSYZ. KROR

History
- First air date: June 1927

Technical information
- Licensing authority: FCC
- Facility ID: 9933
- Class: C
- Power: 1,000 watts
- Transmitter coordinates: 40°40′5.00″N 99°4′52.00″W
- Translator: 96.1 K241CN (Kearney)

Links
- Public license information: Public file; LMS
- Webcast: Listen live
- Website: kgfw.com

KGFW (1340 AM) is an American radio station broadcasting a News Talk Information format. Licensed to Kearney, Nebraska, United States, the station serves the Grand Island-Kearney area. The station is owned by Usher Media Group and features programming from Fox News Radio, Compass Media Networks, Premiere Networks and Westwood One. KGFW is a sister station to KQKY and KRNY.

== History ==
The station was founded in Ravenna, Nebraska, in June 1927 by Roy McConnell, a former radio technician in the United States Navy. The station moved to Kearney in 1931. In 1939, the station was purchased by Lloyd "Skipper" Thomas, a Nebraska native who had managed major radio stations including Pittsburgh's KDKA and Boston's WBZ.

After Thomas' death in 1952, the station was purchased by John Mitchell, a lawyer who had worked as a part-time announcer at the station.

Mitchell's stations were purchased by Waitt Radio in 2000. Waitt Radio merged with NewRadio Group in 2005 to form NRG Media.

On November 26, 2025, Usher Media announced it would acquire NRG Media's Kearney-Grand Island cluster, which includes KGFW, for $3.75 million. The sale was consummated on April 8, 2026.

== Notable alumni ==
- Floyd Kalber, broadcaster for NBC
- Charlie Tuna, prominent Los Angeles-based DJ
