= University of Nebraska at Kearney =

Public university in Kearney, Nebraska, US

- Former names: Kearney State Normal School (1905–1921); Kearney State Teachers College (1921–1963); Kearney State College (1963–1991)
- Motto: Be Blue. Be Gold. BE BOLD.
- Type: Public university
- Established: 1905
- Parent institution: University of Nebraska system
- Academic affiliations: Space-grant
- Chancellor: Neal Schnoor
- President: Jeffrey P. Gold
- Vice-Chancellor: Julie Shaffer
- Students: 5,699 (fall 2025)
- Undergraduates: 4,056 (fall 2025)
- Postgraduates: 1,643 (fall 2025)
- Location: Kearney, Nebraska, United States; 40°42′02″N 99°06′03″W
- Campus: Rural, 235 acres (95 ha)
- Colors: Blue and gold
- Nickname: Lopers
- Sporting affiliations: NCAA Division II – The MIAA
- Mascot: Louie the Loper
- Website: www.unk.edu

The University of Nebraska at Kearney (UNK) is a public university in Kearney, Nebraska, United States. It is a part of the University of Nebraska system. The University of Nebraska at Kearney has three colleges for undergraduate degrees. These include the College of Arts and Sciences, the College of Business and Technology, and the College of Education. Additionally, through a partnership with the University of Nebraska Medical Center, the university offers nursing and allied health programs. The University of Nebraska at Kearney also operates the Museum of Nebraska Art, and the campus also contains the G.W. Frank Museum of History and Culture.

As of 2025, the university enrolls 4,130 undergraduate students. The university includes 39 undergraduate fields of study. Major fields of study include Business Administration, Teacher Education and Professional Development, Parks, Recreation and Leisure Studies, Liberal Arts and Sciences, and Family and Consumer Economics and Related Studies. The university was formed in 1903 by the Nebraska State Legislature as Kearney State Normal School. The school would later join the University of Nebraska system in 1990 and would re-brand to its current name in 1991.

The UNK athletic teams are called the Lopers. The university is a member of the Division II level of the National Collegiate Athletic Association (NCAA), primarily competing in the Mid-America Intercollegiate Athletics Association (MIAA) for most of its sports since the 2012–13 academic year. UNK competes in 17 intercollegiate varsity sports: Men's sports include basketball, cross country, football, tennis, track & field (indoor and outdoor) and wrestling; Women's sports include basketball, cross country, golf, soccer, softball, swimming & diving, tennis, track & field (indoor and outdoor) and volleyball.

== History ==
The University of Nebraska at Kearney was originally formed in 1903 as the Kearney State Normal School. It was formed by the Nebraska State Legislature after $50,000 was appropriated to build the normal school. The school was originally a part of the Nebraska State College System. The school was originally located in different public facilities until the completion of its first building in October 1905. The first president was Augustus O. Thomas. Thomas had previously served as the superintendent of Kearney Public Schools. He served as president of Kearney State Normal School until his dismissal in 1913.

In 1921, the state legislature changed all normal schools, including Kearney State, to being teachers colleges. This also allowed for the college to offer four-year degrees. Additionally, it changed its name to Kearney State Teachers College. In 1963, the legislature again changed the name of the college, this time to Kearney State College. In 1967, the first building on campus was condemned by the state fire marshal. The auditorium wing of the building was demolished the following year. The rest of the building was demolished in 1984.

In 1989, it was announced that Kearney State College would be transferred from the Nebraska State College System to the University of Nebraska system. Said decision was blocked by then-Nebraska Attorney General Robert Spire. The lawsuit was then brought to the Nebraska Supreme Court where it was later cleared the following year. Kearney State College officially re-branded to the University of Nebraska at Kearney in 1991.

In common with other campuses in the NU system, the university faced financial distress in the early 2020s, necessitating schoolwide job and program cuts. In 2023, university leaders planned to eliminate over 24 faculty positions and nine degree programs to begin to mitigate the university's $4.3 million budgetary shortfall. In July 2026, the university launched its flight school, Loper Flight Academy, operating seven Tecnam P-Mentor aircraft out of Kearney Regional Airport.

== Campus ==
The University of Nebraska at Kearney's campus is located in Kearney, Nebraska, United States. The campus includes 58 buildings and Foster Field. The oldest building on campus is the Alumni House, which was built in 1907.

The university also has an eCampus, offering online undergraduate and graduate degree programs, as well as a blended-learning (online and face-to-face) driver education endorsement program.

Also located on the campus is KLPR, an alternative rock station operated by the University of Nebraska at Kearney.

=== Museums ===
The Museum of Nebraska Art, founded by the state legislature and located in Kearney since 1986, is administered as a department of the university. The G.W. Frank Museum of History and Culture is a Richardsonian Romanesque mansion on the western edge of campus, formerly the residence of the administrator of the Nebraska State Tubercular Hospital. Now listed on the National Register of Historic Places, the G.W. Frank Museum of History and Culture is open to the public, as well as being used for university functions.

== Academics ==
Undergraduate demographics as of fall 2023
Race and ethnicity	Total
White	73%
Hispanic	15%
International student	4%
Black	3%
Two or more races	3%
Asian	1%
Economic diversity
Low-income (Note: The percentage of students who received an income-based federal Pell grant intended for low-income students.)	35%
Affluent (Note: The percentage of students who are a part of the American middle class at the bare minimum.)	65%

The University of Nebraska at Kearney is a public university operated by the University of Nebraska system. As of 2025, the university enrolls 4,130 undergraduate students. The university includes 39 undergraduate fields of study. Major fields of study include Business Administration, Teacher Education and Professional Development, Parks, Recreation and Leisure Studies, Liberal Arts and Sciences, and Family Cand Consumer Economics and Related Studies.

=== Structure ===
The University of Nebraska at Kearney has three colleges for undergraduate degrees. These include the College of Arts and Sciences, College of Business and Technology, and the College of Education. Additionally, through a partnership with the University of Nebraska Medical Center, the university offers nursing and allied health programs.

== Administration ==
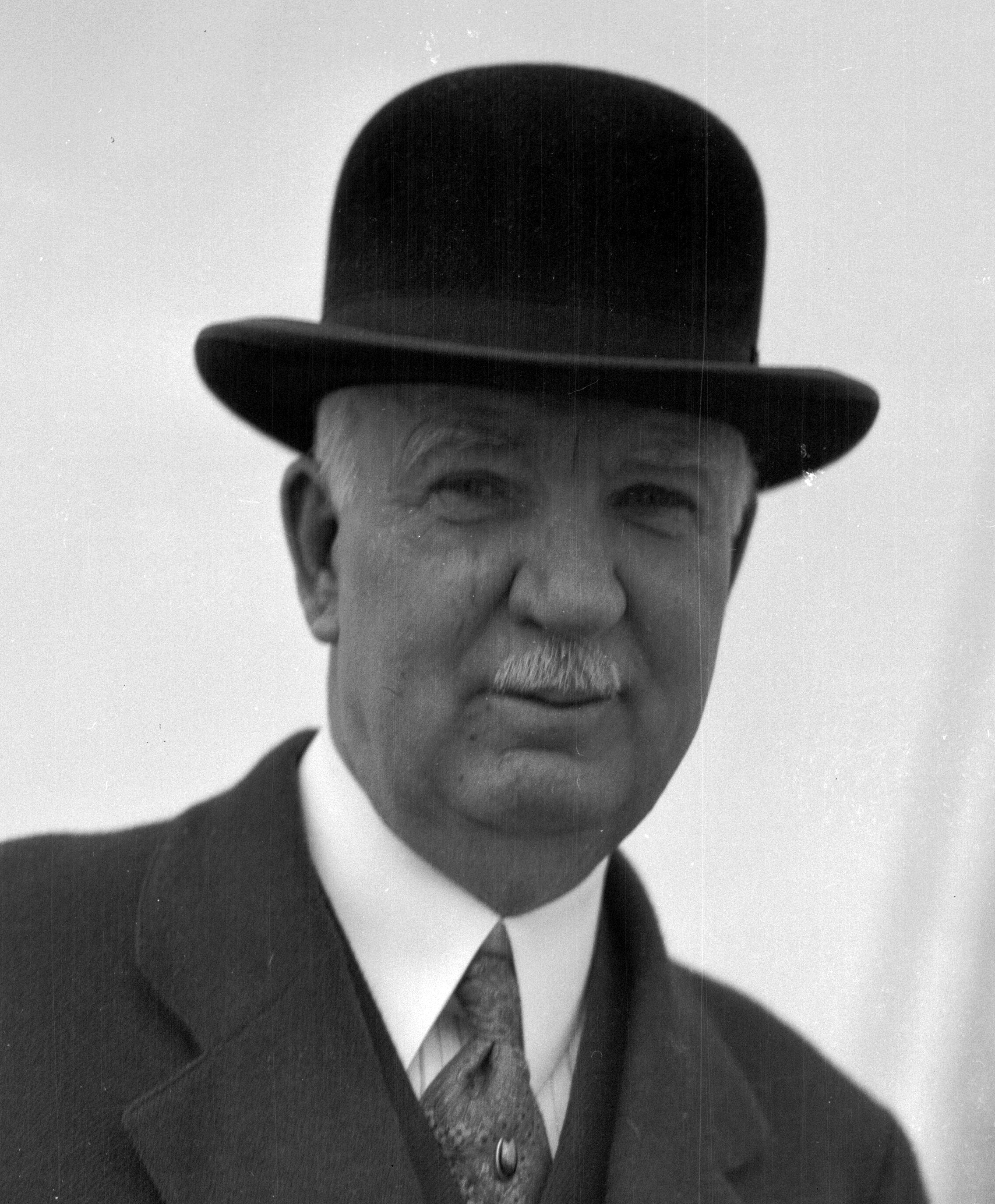
Augustus Orloff Thomas, the University of Nebraska at Kearney's first president who served from 1905 to 1913

The University of Nebraska at Kearney is a member of the University of Nebraska system, and is governed by the University of Nebraska Board of Regents. The current president of the university under the University of Nebraska system is Jeffrey P. Gold, who has served since 2024. The current chancellor of the university is Neal Schnoor, who has served since 2025. The Board of Regents contains a twelve-member panel consisting of eight voting members and a non-voting student body president from each campus.

Voting members are elected by district to six-year terms; elections are held in even-numbered years. The board of regents meets at Varner Hall on East Campus of the University of Nebraska–Lincoln and supervises the operation, expenditures, and tuition rates of each university in the system. From 1905 to 1990, the University of Nebraska at Kearney was a part of the Nebraska State College System and had its own president. After the university joined the University of Nebraska system, the title of president was dropped in favor of chancellor.

== Athletics ==
Nebraska–Kearney Athletics wordmark

The Nebraska–Kearney (UNK) athletic teams are called the Lopers. The university is a member of the Division II level of the National Collegiate Athletic Association (NCAA), primarily competing in the Mid-America Intercollegiate Athletics Association (MIAA) for most of its sports since the 2012–13 academic year.

UNK competes in 17 intercollegiate varsity sports: Men's sports include basketball, cross country, football, tennis, track & field (indoor and outdoor) and wrestling; Women's sports include basketball, cross country, golf, soccer, softball, swimming & diving, tennis, track & field (indoor and outdoor) and volleyball.

== Notable alumni ==
- Emily Balcetis – professor of psychology
- Jon Bokenkamp – television writer and producer
- Joba Chamberlain – New York Yankees pitcher
- Richard Davenport – president of Minnesota State University, Mankato
- Tervel Dlagnev – wrestler, bronze medal at 2012 Olympics
- Gary Dop – poet
- Bob Green – football coach
- Marg Helgenberger – actress
- Arthur Hobbs – football player
- Jack Hoffman – football player
- Bart Kofoed – basketball player
- Richard G. Kopf – judge, U.S. District Court for the District of Nebraska
- Tom Kropp – basketball player
- Stephen Lawhead – science-fiction author
- Ira J. McDonald – Los Angeles City Council member, 1941–45
- Bill Milldyke – broadcast journalist
- Harry Northup – actor
- Larry L. Peterson – computer scientist
- Mahabir Pun – Ramon Magsaysay Award winning Nepalese philanthropist
- Randy Rasmussen – former New York Jets player
- Tim Schlattmann – co-executive producer of Dexter
- Raufeon Stots – two-time NCAA Division II Wrestling champion, current Bellator mixed martial artist
- Tauese Sunia – former governor of American Samoa
- Kamaru Usman – wrestler
- Tyrus – professional wrestler
- Don Welch – poet
- Ty Danielson – college basketball coach

== Notable faculty ==
- Allison Hedge Coke – English professor
- Don Welch – English professor
