= Kearney Hub =

Daily American newspaper

- November 1, 2007 front page of the Kearney Hub
- Type: Daily newspaper
- Owner(s): Lee Enterprises
- Publisher: Shon Barenklau, since 2018
- Founded: 1888; 137 years ago
- Language: English
- Headquarters: 13 East 22nd Street, P.O. Box 1988, Kearney, NE 68848
- Circulation: 4,718 Daily (as of 2023)
- OCLC number: 33363671
- Website: kearneyhub.com

The Kearney Hub is a daily newspaper published in Kearney, Nebraska, United States, and is the primary newspaper for south-central region of Nebraska surrounding the city, including Buffalo County, Nebraska and the Kearney Micropolitan Statistical Area.

== History ==
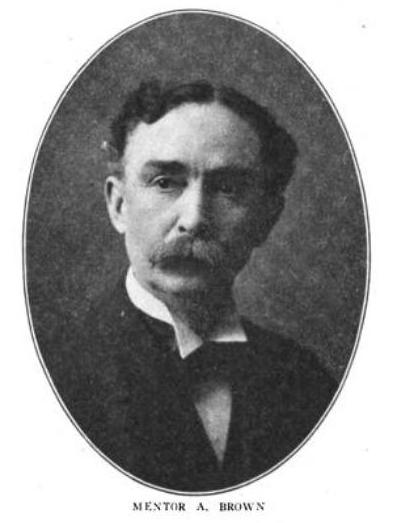
Mentor A. Brown, founder of the paper

The paper was founded in 1888, and was first published on October 22, 1888. Its founders included Mentor A. Brown (1853-1932), formerly of the Beatrice Press, and R.H. Eaton, who together organized the Hub Printing Company to publish the paper and to take over the Central Nebraska Press which dated from 1873. The name "Hub" was chosen because the town was considered the "hub" of the continent, located 1733 miles from both Boston and San Francisco.

Mentor's son Hugh Brown took over the paper after his death in 1932. The subsequent leaders of the paper have been Ormond Hill, Robert S. Ayres, Daryl Hall, Steve Chatelain, and Julie Speirs. Speirs was named publisher and president in 2012, having previously served as vice president and general manager.

The Omaha World-Herald Co. purchased the Hub in 1984. Berkshire Hathaway purchased the World-Herald and its subsidiaries in 2011, the purchase serving as the foundation for its BH Media Group. Lee Enterprises purchased the paper in 2020.

Starting July 18, 2023, the print edition of the newspaper will be reduced to three days a week: Tuesday, Thursday and Saturday. Also, the newspaper will transition from being delivered by a traditional newspaper delivery carrier to mail delivery by the U.S. Postal Service.
