= Kearney, Nebraska =

City in the United States

- City
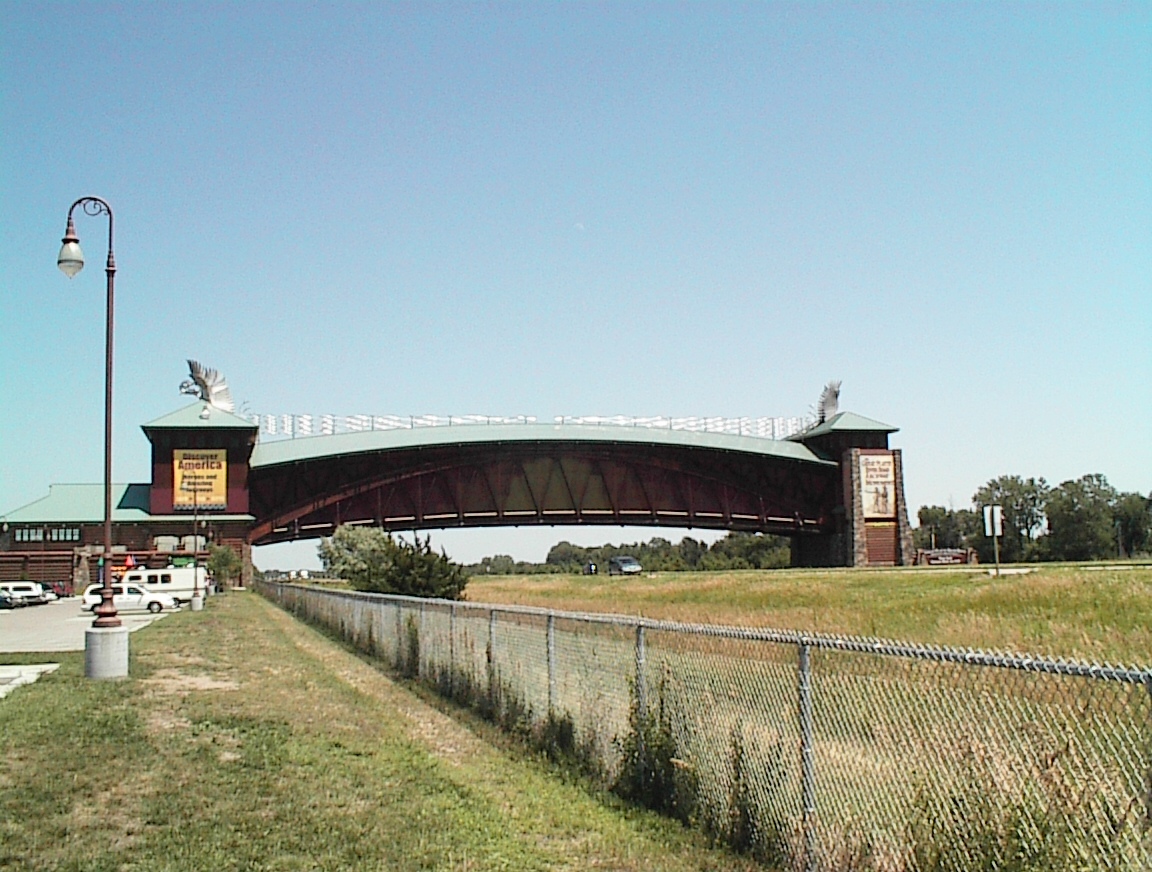
- The Great Platte River Road Archway Monument, which spans Interstate 80

- Flag Logo

- Location of Kearney within Nebraska and Buffalo County

- Location within the United States
- Coordinates: 40°42′06″N 99°04′57″W
- Country: United States
- State: Nebraska
- County: Buffalo

Government
  - Type: Council–manager
  - Mayor: Jonathan Nikkila

Area
  - Total: 15.15 sq mi (39.25 km^{2})
  - Land: 14.88 sq mi (38.53 km^{2})
  - Water: 0.28 sq mi (0.72 km^{2})
- Elevation: 2,152 ft (656 m)

Population (2020)
  - Total: 33,790
  - Density: 2,271.3/sq mi (876.95/km^{2})
- Time zone: UTC−6 (Central (CST))
  - Summer (DST): UTC−5 (CDT)
- ZIP codes: 68845, 68847, 68848 (P.O. Box), 68849 UNK
- Area code: 308
- FIPS code: 31-25055
- GNIS feature ID: 838076
- Website: cityofkearney.org

Kearney (/ˈkɑːrni/ KAR-nee) is a city in and the county seat of Buffalo County, Nebraska, United States. The population was 33,790 in the 2020 census, making it the 5th most populous city in Nebraska. It is home to the University of Nebraska at Kearney. The westward push of the railroad as the Civil War ended gave new birth to the community.

== History ==
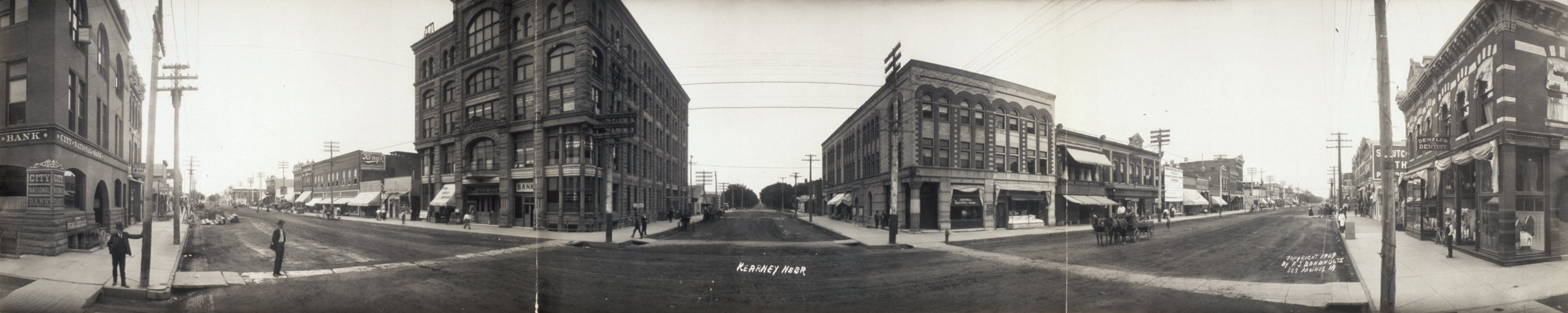
Panorama c. 1909

In the late 1840s, American settlers traveling westward arrived in significant numbers along the Mormon Trail and Overland Trails. This marked the beginning of Kearney's role as a crossroads on major east-west transportation arteries. In 1848, to safeguard westward migrants traveling through the region, the US Army established a military fort several miles southeast of the present city. Named after famed frontier military officer Stephen W. Kearny, Fort Kearny would become the namesake of the present city and serve as a stopping-point for gold prospectors, Pony Express riders, and Union Pacific Railroad workers until 1871.

The first permanent settlement in the area was called Dobytown, located 2 miles (3.2 km) southeast of the present-day Kearney. The "e" in Kearney was added by mistake sometime afterwards by postmen who consistently misspelled the town name; eventually the spelling became nomenclature. The region expanded in 1866 with the arrival of the Union Pacific Railroad. The fixing of a junction point with the Burlington & Missouri River Railroad in 1871 anticipated the establishment of a townsite in the summer of that year. The city of Kearney was incorporated on December 3, 1873, the townsite being fixed a mile north of the Platte River. In 1874, Kearney was chosen as the seat of Buffalo County, experiencing population growth, economic investment, and infrastructure expansion in subsequent years that transformed the nascent city into a regional economic and cultural center. This boom would be sustained through the next twenty years, fueled by a post-Civil War period of frenzied economic expansion and wealth generation (Gilded Age) that was transforming the whole nation. Enterprising investors poured into the burgeoning community from the East and elsewhere, hoping to enrich themselves through ambitious speculative development schemes that often proved to be ill-conceived and economically unsustainable. An irrigation canal, electric street railway, and a five-story opera house were but some of the speculative projects to be realized, marking Kearney as one of the most progressive and enterprising small cities west of the Missouri River. These flush times would grind to a sudden halt as a result of the agricultural depression and economic crisis of the early 1890s. Though its early boosters' grand aspirations for the community were never fulfilled, Kearney would remain a hub of business, higher education, and transportation in central Nebraska, a role that persists into the twenty-first century.

In 1912, the Catholic diocese of Kearney was centered here. The diocese was suppressed in 1917, with the creation of the diocese of Grand Island. In 1997, the historical diocese of Kearney began to be used as a titular see by the Catholic Church.

== Geography ==
Kearney is located on I-80 with access to the major markets of Omaha-Lincoln, Denver, Kansas City, Des Moines, Wichita and Cheyenne, Kearney is at the center of a seven-state region and 20 million people.

According to the United States Census Bureau, the city has a total area of 13.00 square miles (33.67 km^{2}), of which 12.77 square miles (33.07 km^{2}) is land and 0.23 square miles (0.60 km^{2}) is water.

=== Climate ===
Climate data for Kearney 4 NE, Nebraska (1991–2020 normals, extremes 1901–present)
Month	Jan	Feb	Mar	Apr	May	Jun	Jul	Aug	Sep	Oct	Nov	Dec	Year
Record high °F (°C)	77 (25)	79 (26)	95 (35)	100 (38)	103 (39)	108 (42)	114 (46)	111 (44)	108 (42)	95 (35)	83 (28)	77 (25)	114 (46)
Mean maximum °F (°C)	59.6 (15.3)	65.4 (18.6)	77.4 (25.2)	85.1 (29.5)	90.8 (32.7)	95.8 (35.4)	98.5 (36.9)	96.0 (35.6)	93.1 (33.9)	86.8 (30.4)	74.0 (23.3)	61.1 (16.2)	99.3 (37.4)
Mean daily maximum °F (°C)	35.9 (2.2)	39.7 (4.3)	51.4 (10.8)	61.6 (16.4)	71.5 (21.9)	82.3 (27.9)	86.6 (30.3)	84.4 (29.1)	77.9 (25.5)	64.9 (18.3)	50.5 (10.3)	38.2 (3.4)	62.1 (16.7)
Daily mean °F (°C)	24.8 (−4.0)	28.1 (−2.2)	38.3 (3.5)	48.6 (9.2)	59.5 (15.3)	70.4 (21.3)	74.8 (23.8)	72.6 (22.6)	64.5 (18.1)	51.3 (10.7)	37.9 (3.3)	27.4 (−2.6)	49.8 (9.9)
Mean daily minimum °F (°C)	13.8 (−10.1)	16.5 (−8.6)	25.2 (−3.8)	35.6 (2.0)	47.4 (8.6)	58.5 (14.7)	63.0 (17.2)	60.9 (16.1)	51.1 (10.6)	37.8 (3.2)	25.3 (−3.7)	16.6 (−8.6)	37.6 (3.1)
Mean minimum °F (°C)	−7.1 (−21.7)	−3.0 (−19.4)	6.5 (−14.2)	21.1 (−6.1)	33.0 (0.6)	46.2 (7.9)	52.8 (11.6)	50.1 (10.1)	36.6 (2.6)	21.3 (−5.9)	8.7 (−12.9)	−2.2 (−19.0)	−11.6 (−24.2)
Record low °F (°C)	−28 (−33)	−28 (−33)	−21 (−29)	0 (−18)	19 (−7)	35 (2)	42 (6)	37 (3)	19 (−7)	6 (−14)	−13 (−25)	−30 (−34)	−30 (−34)
Average precipitation inches (mm)	0.51 (13)	0.59 (15)	1.46 (37)	2.68 (68)	4.40 (112)	3.90 (99)	3.36 (85)	3.01 (76)	1.84 (47)	2.13 (54)	1.00 (25)	0.68 (17)	25.56 (649)
Average snowfall inches (cm)	3.7 (9.4)	5.6 (14)	3.5 (8.9)	1.9 (4.8)	0.1 (0.25)	0.0 (0.0)	0.0 (0.0)	0.0 (0.0)	0.0 (0.0)	0.8 (2.0)	2.8 (7.1)	3.4 (8.6)	21.8 (55)
Average extreme snow depth inches (cm)	3 (7.6)	4 (10)	3 (7.6)	1 (2.5)	0 (0)	0 (0)	0 (0)	0 (0)	0 (0)	0 (0)	1 (2.5)	2 (5.1)	4 (10)
Average precipitation days (≥ 0.01 in)	3.8	4.5	5.9	8.5	11.7	9.6	8.8	8.4	6.5	6.6	4.2	3.5	82.0
Average snowy days (≥ 0.1 in)	2.7	3.4	1.8	0.9	0.0	0.0	0.0	0.0	0.0	0.5	1.3	2.4	13.0
Source: NOAA

== Demographics ==
Historical population
Census	Pop.	Note	%±
1880	1,782		—
1890	8,074		353.1%
1900	5,634		−30.2%
1910	6,202		10.1%
1920	7,702		24.2%
1930	8,575		11.3%
1940	9,643		12.5%
1950	12,115		25.6%
1960	14,210		17.3%
1970	19,181		35.0%
1980	21,158		10.3%
1990	24,396		15.3%
2000	27,431		12.4%
2010	30,787		12.2%
2020	33,790		9.8%
U.S. Decennial Census; 2018 Estimate

Kearney is the principal city of the Kearney, Nebraska Micropolitan Statistical Area, which consists of Buffalo and Kearney counties.

=== 2020 census ===
As of the 2020 census, Kearney had a population of 33,790. The population density was 2,270.8 per square mile (877.0/km^{2}).

99.7% of residents lived in urban areas, while 0.3% lived in rural areas.

There were 13,566 households and 7,772 families in Kearney, of which 28.5% had children under the age of 18 living in them. Of all households, 42.4% were married-couple households, 20.8% were households with a male householder and no spouse or partner present, and 29.3% were households with a female householder and no spouse or partner present. About 33.0% of all households were made up of individuals and 10.9% had someone living alone who was 65 years of age or older. The average household size was 2.4 and the average family size was 2.9.

There were 14,429 housing units at an average density of 965.7 per square mile (373.0/km^{2}); 6.0% were vacant. The homeowner vacancy rate was 1.1% and the rental vacancy rate was 6.5%.

The median age was 32.1 years. 22.6% of residents were under the age of 18 and 14.8% of residents were 65 years of age or older. For every 100 females there were 93.9 males, and for every 100 females age 18 and over there were 90.8 males age 18 and over.

Racial composition as of the 2020 census
Race	Number	Percent
White	28,734	85.0%
Black or African American	551	1.6%
American Indian and Alaska Native	196	0.6%
Asian	634	1.9%
Native Hawaiian and Other Pacific Islander	30	0.1%
Some other race	1,563	4.6%
Two or more races	2,082	6.2%
Hispanic or Latino (of any race)	3,648	10.8%

=== 2016–2020 American Community Survey ===
The 2016–2020 5-year American Community Survey estimates show that the median household income was $60,755 (with a margin of error of +/- $4,444) and the median family income $85,444 (+/- $4,564). Males had a median income of $36,227 (+/- $3,446) versus $23,904 (+/- $2,231) for females. The median income for those above 16 years old was $29,317 (+/- $3,191). Approximately, 7.5% of families and 14.7% of the population were below the poverty line, including 13.6% of those under the age of 18 and 10.1% of those ages 65 or over.

=== 2010 census ===
As of the census of 2010, there were 30,787 people, 12,201 households, and 7,015 families residing in the city. The population density was 2,410.9 inhabitants per square mile (930.9/km^{2}). There were 12,738 housing units at an average density of 997.5 per square mile (385.1/km^{2}). The racial makeup of the city was 92.3% White, 1.0% African American, 0.3% Native American, 1.8% Asian, 3.1% from other races, and 1.4% from two or more races. Hispanic or Latino of any race were 7.3% of the population.

There were 12,201 households, of which 29.4% had children under the age of 18 living with them, 43.7% were married couples living together, 9.9% had a female householder with no husband present, 4.0% had a male householder with no wife present, and 42.5% were non-families. 30.4% of all households were made up of individuals, and 9% had someone living alone who was 65 years of age or older. The average household size was 2.36 and the average family size was 2.96 .

The median age in the city was 29 years. 22.2% of residents were under age 18; 20.5% were between ages 18 and 24; 25.6% were aged 25 to 44; 20.6% were aged 45 to 64; and 11.1% were aged 65 years or older. The gender makeup of the city was 48.9% male and 51.1% female.

=== 2000 census ===
As of the census of 2000, there were 29,952 people, 10,549 households, and 6,160 families residing in the city. The population density was 2,498.5 inhabitants per square mile (964.7/km^{2}). There were 11,099 housing units at an average density of 1,010.9 per square mile (390.3/km^{2}). The racial makeup of the city was 95.18% White, 0.63% African American, 0.38% Native American, 0.92% Asian, 0.04% Pacific Islander, 1.68% from other races, and 1.17% from two or more races. Hispanic or Latino of any race were 4.08% of the population.

There were 10,549 households, out of which 30.3% had children under the age of 18 living with them, 45.7% were married couples living together, 9.7% had a female householder with no husband present, and 41.6% were non-families. 28.7% of all households were made up of individuals, and 9.5% had someone living alone who was 65 years of age or older. The average household size was 2.37 and the average family size was 2.96 .

The median age in the city was 27 years. 22.2% of the population was under age 18 years old, 23.9% were aged from 18 to 24, 26.2% from 25 to 44, 17.1% from 45 to 64, and 10.6% were 65 years of age or older. For every 100 females, there were 92.6 males. For every 100 females aged 18 and over, there were 89.7 males.

The median income for a household in the city was $34,829, and the median income for a family was $46,650. Males had a median income of $30,150 versus $22,366 for females. The per capita income for the city was $17,713. About 7.4% of families and 13.4% of the population were below the poverty line, including 11.8% of those under age 18 and 8.9% of those age 65 or over.

== Economy ==
Companies headquartered in Kearney include Citizens Telecommunications Company of Nebraska and The Buckle.

According to Buffalo County Economic Development, the top non-manufacturing employers in the city are:

Top non-manufacturing employers
#	Employer	Employees
1	Good Samaritan Hospital	1,000+
2	University of Nebraska at Kearney	1,000+
3	Kearney Public Schools	750-1,000
4	Buckle (clothing retailer)	750–1,000
5	Kearney Regional Medical Center	500–750
6	HyVee	500–750
7	Cash-Wa	500–750
8	Walmart	250–500
9	Cabela's	250–500

The top manufacturing employers are:

Top manufacturing employers
#	Employer	Employees
1	Baldwin Filters	1,000+
2	West Pharmaceutical Services	250–500
3	Eaton	100–300
4	Chief Industries	100–250
5	BluePrint Engines	100–250
6	Morris Printing Group	100–250

== Arts and culture ==
Kearney is home to several museums, many of which reflect its location on the California, Mormon, Oregon, and Pony Express trails, and the Lincoln Highway.

- The Great Platte River Road Archway Monument spans Interstate 80 at mile marker 274 and contains exhibits that trace the history of the Great Platte River Road from the Oregon Trail days to the present. President Bill Clinton toured the Great Platte River Road Archway Monument on December 8, 2000, while on a visit to Kearney. Jack Nicholson was filmed in a scene at the Archway for the movie About Schmidt.
- The Museum of Nebraska Art, the state's official art collection, houses artworks spanning 175 years, from the 19th century to the present.
- The George W. Frank House is an 1890s historic mansion located at the University of Nebraska at Kearney. The Robert M. Merryman Performing Arts Center, located in the city's Central Elementary School, is a 750 seat theater completed in 2006.
- The Trails & Rails Museum is home to many of the county's historic structures from the late 1800s-through the mid-1900s.
- The 5,500 seat Viaero Event Center hosts concerts, events, and performances, and is home to the Tri-City Storm, a United States Hockey League team.
- In 2013, the Shrine Bowl State High School All-Star Football Game was moved from Lincoln to Kearney.
- Two microbreweries, Thunderhead Brewing and the Platte Valley Brewery, are located in downtown Kearney.
- The Classic Car Collection is an automotive museum containing over 210 automobiles.
- The World Theatre is a historic movie theater and performing arts center in Kearney that opened in 1927.

== Sports ==
- Kearney Yankees, 1956–1959, minor league baseball team affiliated with the major league team New York Yankees
- Tri-City Diesel, professional indoor football team that played in the early 2000s
- Tri-City Storm, Tier I junior ice hockey team in the West Division of the United States Hockey League (USHL)

== Government ==
The council-manager form of government is used in Kearney. The City Council makes legislative and policy-making decisions. There are five members, elected citywide to serve staggered four-year terms. One member is chosen by the council to be Mayor. Stanley Clouse served as Mayor from 2006–2024; Jonathan Nikkila assumed the role in December 2024. The council-manager form was adopted in 1950.

The council appoints a city manager to implement policies, prepare a budget, appoint department heads, and recommend areas to which the council needs to attend. Michael W. Morgan retired as city manager January 1, 2024 and Brenda Jensen took over as interim manager until she was appointed and made official city manager on May 1, 2024.

== Education ==
=== Primary and secondary schools ===
- Kearney Public Schools operates 3 preschools, 10 elementary schools, 2 middle schools, and Kearney High School
- Zion Lutheran School
- Faith Christian School of Kearney
- Kearney West High School, at the Youth Rehabilitation and Treatment Center
- Kearney Catholic High School

=== Post-Secondary Schools ===
- Central Community College has a branch campus in Kearney.
- University of Nebraska at Kearney (UNK) is located in the city. The campus is a 235-acre (0.95 km^{2}) residential campus with more than 37 buildings. It was founded in 1905 as Nebraska State Normal School at Kearney and became Nebraska State Teachers College in 1921. Between 1963 and 1991 the school was known as Kearney State College. The college's name was changed to University of Nebraska at Kearney in 1991, when it joined the University of Nebraska system.

== Media ==
Newspaper

- Kearney Hub

Radio

- KGFW AM 1340
- KXPN (AM) 1460
- KGFW FM 96.1
- KKPR-FM 98.9
- KRNY FM 102.3
- KQKY FM 105.9

Television

- KHGI-TV

== Transportation ==
The city operates Kearney Regional Airport located east of the city. Commercial air service is available via United Express with twice-daily service to Denver International Airport, as well as a daily non-stop flight to O'Hare Airport in Chicago, IL. The Union Pacific Railroad east-west main line runs through Kearney. Greyhound Bus Lines stops to pick up or discharge passengers in Kearney at 112 W. Talmadge Rd.

== Notable people ==
- Drew Anderson, MLB player
- George A. Beecher (1868–1951), bishop of Western Nebraska
- Jon Bokenkamp, writer and producer
- Cyrus Allen Black, taxidermist, decoy-maker and amateur baseball player
- Solomon Butcher, photographer of the Homestead era in Nebraska, lived in Kearney for about a decade, beginning in 1902
- Alexander H. Conner, politician
- Leslie Easterbrook, actress
- Tom Kropp, professional basketball player
- James A. Lake, evolutionary biologist
- Lorraine Langford, Nebraska politician
- Kyle Larson, NFL player
- Stephen R. Lawhead, author
- Brett Maher, NFL player
- David Martin, congressman
- Bill Milldyke, journalist and foreign correspondent
- Andy Pessoa, actor and the Raf From Transformers Prime
- Peter George Peterson, U.S. Secretary of Commerce 1972–73, co-founder of the Blackstone Group
- Ryan Quincy, Emmy-winning animator, producer, and voice actor
- Tim Schlattmann, screenwriter
- Dan Schlissel, record producer and label founder (Stand Up! Records, -ismist Recordings)
- Kathy Lou Schultz, poet and scholar
- Isaiah Stalbird, NFL Player
- Charlie Tuna, radio personality
- Elizabeth T. Uldall, linguist
- Chuck Welch, artist
- Don Welch, American poet and academic, professor at the University of Nebraska at Kearney
- Dale E. Wolf, businessman and politician

== In popular culture ==
- Dexter (season 6), episode 7 ("Nebraska", airdate November 13, 2011) was set in Kearney, Nebraska.
- The Echo Maker, book by Richard Powers. The events of the book partly take place in Kearney, Nebraska.
