= Anne S. Herr =

American television personality

Anne Smith Herr (née Smith; Feb 17, 1921–Nov 12, 2002) was a host and weathercaster at WGAL in Lancaster, Pennsylvania. She was notably known as one of WGAL's pioneering women, like Marijane Landis, Joan Klein Weidman, and Barbara M. Allen.

== Early life and education ==
Herr was born in Cincinnati but lived in Pennsylvania from the age of three, and graduated from Brockville High School. She thought she would have a career as a dress designer and enrolled at Indiana University of Pennsylvania majoring in textile design. However she realized her interests were more artistic and transferred to Clarion State College at the end of her sophomore year, earning a Bachelor of Science in Education in 1944. After college she studied for two years with a drama coach. She also acted in summer stock productions at Mt. Gretna, which she attributed to providing a foundation for her television roles.

== Career ==
She worked for 30 years at WGAL starting in 1951, in which she was part of the Noonday on 8 crew as an interviewer and host, and as one of the weather girls on WGAL's evening news from 1959 to 1962. In 1963, she produced her own Herr Today show with news and interviews. She received the "Pennsylvania Speaker of the Year" award in 1964.

In 1978, she was named "Women's Program Director" which was a newly created administrative position. She was a public affairs commentator from 1975-1981 and produced and hosted World of Women from 1978 to 1981 on WGAL.

She then went on to be a news reporter on WSBA-TV (now WPMT) in York and then as a news promo broadcaster at WCAU in Philadelphia.

== Personal life ==
She met her husband Jacob Herr at a USO dance at Clarion and they married in 1945. Her hobbies included volunteering in the community, acting in local theater productions and sewing her own costumes, playing piano, and painting.

Herr died on November 12, 2002, at age 81, after being ill for a short time at her home while under her physician's care. Her husband died in 1996, and they have a son and two grandchildren.
