= John MacAlarney =

American broadcaster

John MacAlarney (c. 1930 – January 9, 2016) was an American radio and television personality. After working as a salesman, he joined WGAL in 1957, working as a news anchor.

MacAlarney anchored local election newscasts for the 1972 United States presidential election, and with Dick Hoxworth, Bill Saylor, and Gene Schenck, reported on election nights from each county's Republican and Democratic Party headquarters for the first time in Lancaster County. He served as a master of ceremonies at the Miss Elizabethtown Pageant, and hosted WGAL Channel 8's bingo game.

After 23 years at the Lancaster, Pennsylvania-based NBC network affiliate, he left the station in 1980. He then joined the Christian radio station WDAC as a news director until he retired from broadcasting in 1991.

MacAlarney died in 2016 at the age of 85.
