= Barbara Allen =

Barbara Allen may refer to:

- Barbara Allen (politician) (born 1961), Kansas state senator
- Barbara Allen (writer), pseudonym of Vivian Stuart (1914–1986)
- Barbara Allen Rainey (1948–1982), first woman designated a U.S. naval aviator
- Barbara Jo Allen (1906–1974), American actress
- Barbara M. Allen (c. 1939–2017), American television interviewer, producer, and public relations executive
- "Barbara Allen" (song), broadside ballad
