= Phil Johnston (filmmaker) =

American filmmaker and voice actor

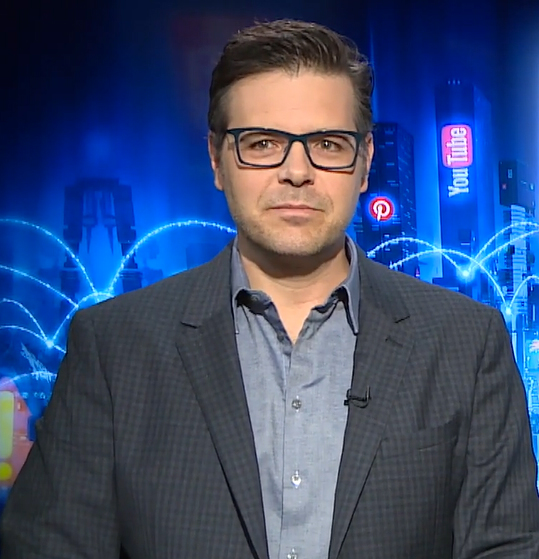
- Johnston in 2018
- Born: October 26, 1971 (age 55); Minneapolis, Minnesota, U.S.
- Education: University of Wisconsin-Madison (BA); Columbia University (MFA)
- Occupations: Screenwriter; film director; film producer; voice actor
- Years active: 2004–present
- Employer(s): Walt Disney Animation Studios (2012–2020); Netflix (2022–present)
- Spouse: Jill Cordes

Philip Johnston (born October 26, 1971) is an American filmmaker and voice actor, best known as one of the writers for the Walt Disney Animation Studios films Wreck-It Ralph (2012), Zootopia (2016) and Ralph Breaks the Internet (2018), the latter of which he directed alongside Rich Moore and received an Academy Award nomination.

== Early life and career ==
Johnston was born in Minneapolis to Beverly & William Johnston. He was raised in Neenah, Wisconsin. His father was an Episcopal priest. When he was young, he received an annual pass that allowed him free entry into the Marcus Theatres, a Wisconsin-based theater chain, through a connection at his father's church. Johnston is a graduate of Neenah High School.

He graduated from the University of Wisconsin–Madison in 1994 with a degree in journalism. After graduation he worked in regional news television for nine years. His first job was as a weatherman in Rochester, Minnesota despite knowing nothing about meteorology. He then worked as a bureau reporter at the Omaha, Nebraska, ABC affiliate, KETV. Afterwards, he transferred to KARE station in Minneapolis.

Johnston graduated with a MFA in film from Columbia University School of the Arts' Film Program in 2004. He was classmates with Jennifer Lee, whom he later brought on to co-write Wreck-It Ralph with.

His short, Flightless Birds, about a community of five trying to save their town was shot in South Dakota.

After graduation, Johnston sold his first work to ABC. The half hour comedy, Life is Super, is about a woman who adopts several children and subsequently turning her experience into a podcast.

Johnston optioned his first feature script to ThinkFilm before it went bankrupt. Jeremy Orm Is a Pervert is about the intersection of a preacher's career and his son's pornography business. This was loosely based on his side hustle back in middle school selling pornographic magazines he acquired from upperclassmen to his classmates. He managed to buy a pair of Air Jordans with the profits before eventually getting the operation shut down by his parents.

His script for Cedar Rapids (2011) was included in the 2009 Black List (survey), a list voted by members of the entertainment industry for favorite, unproduced screenplays.

== Personal life ==
Johnston met his wife, Jill Cordes, while working as a reporter at KETV, Nebraska, where she was a morning anchor.

While attending Columbia, he lived in Brooklyn with his wife, Jill. He was neighbors with film critic Christy Lemire.

== Filmography ==
=== Feature films ===
Year	Title	Director	Writer	Producer	Other	Voice Role	Notes
2006	The Night Listener	No	No	No	Yes		Assistant to Patrick Stettner
2007	Savage Grace	No	No	No	Yes		Researcher
2011	Cedar Rapids	No	Yes	No	No		
2012	Wreck-It Ralph	No	Yes	No	Yes	Surge Protector	
2014	A Merry Friggin' Christmas	No	Yes	No	No		Credited as "Michael Brown"
2016	Zootopia	No	Yes	No	Yes	Gideon Grey, Annoyed Citizen	
2017	The Brothers Grimsby	No	Yes	Executive	No		
2018	Ralph Breaks the Internet	Yes	Yes	No	Yes	Surge Protector	Song Lyrics: "A Place Called Slaughter Race", "In This Place"; Creative Leadership
2025	The Twits	Yes	Yes	Yes	Yes	Mr. Napkin	
2026	Hexed	No	Story	Executive	No		

=== Short films ===
Year	Title	Director	Writer	Producer	Film Editor	Other	Role	Notes
2004	A Thousand Words	Yes	Yes	Yes	Yes	No		
2005	Two Men	No	No	Yes	No	No		
2005	Rupture	No	No	No	No	Yes	Chet Rimson (Radio Announcer)	
2005	Flightless Birds	Yes	Yes	Yes	Yes	No		
2007	Bomb	No	No	Yes	No	No		
2013	Garlan Hulse: Where Potential Lives	No	No	Yes	No	Yes	Garlan Hulse	
2024	Dust Monster	No	No	No	No	Yes		Special Thanks

=== Television special ===
Year	Title	Executive Producer
2010	Ghosts/Aliens	Yes

=== Other credits ===
Year	Title	Role
2016	Moana	Creative Leadership
2019	Frozen 2	Creative Leadership
2020	Borat Subsequent Moviefilm	Special Thanks
2022	The Sea Beast	Special Thanks
2025	Zootopia 2	Special Thanks

== Awards and nominations ==
Year	Award	Category	Nominated work	Result	Ref.
2004	WorldFest Houston	Independent Student Film & Videos - Graduate Level Student Productions	A Thousand Words	Won	
2012	Independent Spirit Awards	Best First Screenplay	Cedar Rapids	Nominated	
2013	Annie Awards	Writing in an Animated Feature Production	Wreck-It Ralph	Won	
2017	Annie Awards	Writing in an Animated Feature Production	Zootopia	Won	
2017	Science Fiction and Fantasy Writers of America	Ray Bradbury Award	Zootopia	Nominated	
2018	Chicago Film Critics Association Awards	Best Animated Feature	Ralph Breaks the Internet	Nominated	
2018	Detroit Film Critics Society	Best Animated Feature	Ralph Breaks the Internet	Nominated	
2018	Washington D.C. Area Film Critics Association Awards	Best Animated Feature	Ralph Breaks the Internet	Nominated	
2019	Golden Globe Awards	Best Animated Feature Film	Ralph Breaks the Internet	Nominated	
2019	Alliance of Women Film Journalists	Best Animated Feature Film	Ralph Breaks the Internet	Nominated	
2019	Critics' Choice Awards	Best Animated Feature	Ralph Breaks the Internet	Nominated	
2019	Annie Awards	Directing in a Feature Production	Ralph Breaks the Internet	Nominated	
2019	Annie Awards	Music in a Feature Production	Ralph Breaks the Internet	Nominated	
2019	Annie Awards	Writing in a Feature Production	Ralph Breaks the Internet	Nominated	
2019	Satellite Awards	Best Animated or Mixed Media Feature	Ralph Breaks the Internet	Nominated	
2019	Academy Awards	Best Animated Feature	Ralph Breaks the Internet	Nominated	
