= David Brand (disambiguation) =

David Brand (1912–1979) was an Australian politician.

David Brand may also refer to:

- David Brand (footballer) (born 1951), English former footballer and manager
- David Brand, Lord Brand (1923–1996), Scottish judge
- David Brand, 5th Viscount Hampden (1902–1975), English peer and cricketer

== See also ==
- David Brandt (disambiguation)
