= Mike Hostetler =

American television sportscaster

- Born: Mansfield, Ohio
- Education: Ohio State University
- Occupations: Sports anchor and reporter (formerly)
- Years active: 1976–2022
- Employer(s): WGAL (Lancaster, PA)
- Children: 2

Mike Hostetler is a retired American sportscaster. He is known for his 33 years at WGAL in Lancaster, Pennsylvania, anchoring and reporting sports on News 8 on weeknights in his 46 years covering sports in central Pennsylvania, until his retirement in 2022.

== Early life and education ==
A native of Mansfield, Ohio, Hostetler attended Ohio State University and graduated with a degree in broadcast journalism.

== Career ==
Hostetler began his sports TV career at WCMH in Columbus, Ohio. He then moved to WSYX in Cleveland, Ohio before joining WGAL in late 1989.

In 1990, Hostetler was selected to be WGAL's weekday sports anchor and reporter on "News 8 at 6" and "News 8 at 11." He produced a feature each week in the early 1990s called "Hostetler's Sports Challenge", which took on viewers' dares and challenges. The feature ran for more than 5 years.

In his sports reports, he launched other features such as Friday Fab Five and Hostetler's Heroes.

Pat Principe and Hostetler worked together for 33 years, co-creating, producing, and hosting Football Friday, with Hostetler serving as host while Principe did the live reports from the high schools for football seasons.

On November 15, 2022, on News 8 at 5:30 after his sportscast, Hostetler announced his retirement after 46 years in the business and 33 of them at WGAL News 8, with his last day finalized for November 24. WGAL counted down his favorite moments of sports coverage leading up to his last day. He retired on November 24, 2022.

He returned to WGAL in March 2024, along with other former anchors, on the station's 75th anniversary. He returned again to celebrate Pat Principe's retirement on April 12, 2024.

== Awards and recognition ==
His segment Mike Hostetler's Sports Challenge Returns was selected by the Pennsylvania Association of Broadcasters as the "Best Television Promotional Announcement" when WGAL was named first-place winner in the PAB 1996 "Awards for Excellence in Broadcasting" competition. Hostetler and a photographer and editor won a first-place award in the sports feature division for "Snow Bowl". After he retired, he was honored by state lawmakers for his 33 years at WGAL.
