= Ron Martin (journalist) =

American TV broadcaster

- Occupations: Television journalist, news anchor (formerly)
- Years active: 1977–2020
- Employer(s): WGAL (Lancaster, PA)
- Spouse: Millie Martin
- Children: 3
- Awards: 6 Emmy Awards; WGAL Hall of Fame (2020)

Ron Martin is a retired, Emmy Award-winning American journalist. He worked for 37 years at WGAL in Lancaster, Pennsylvania. He co-anchored News 8 at 5, 6, 10, and 11 in the evenings, until his retirement in 2020 after 37 years with WGAL.

== Early life and education ==
Ron Martin was born and raised in York, Pennsylvania. While attending middle school, he wrote for the student newspaper, an experience which inspired his career in journalism. He attended Howard University, working as a copy boy for NBC while he completed his studies.

== Career ==
After graduating, Martin began working at WGAL in 1983 in the Harrisburg newsroom, covering the daily news in the region surrounding the state capital, before returning to his hometown in York, where he oversaw coverage out of WGAL's newly opened York newsroom in 1984. In 1985, Martin was promoted to weekend news anchor and then, in 2000, became the weeknight news anchor, co-anchoring with Kim Lemon.

At WGAL, Martin covered the Gettysburg tourist train explosion, the Caterpillar workers strike that led to the York plant shutting down, the reopened murder case of Lillie Bell Allen who died during the 1969 York Race Riot, interviewed former president Richard Nixon who was visiting the Susquehanna Valley, the 2001 Red Lion machete attack, gave a black history month report on Olympic sprinter Barney Ewell who was from Lancaster, and was one of five local news anchors to interview President Barack Obama in the White House.

On October 29, 2020, near the end of "News 8 at 6," Martin announced his retirement after nearly 50 years in broadcast journalism and 37 years at WGAL. He retired on November 25, 2020.

In retirement, he began working as a realtor at Inch & Co. Real Estate in south central Pennsylvania and northern Maryland.

== Personal life ==
Martin is married to his wife Millie, and the married couple has 3 children.

== Awards and recognition ==
In 1996, Martin received an award for best single newscast from the Associated Press, as well as a regional Emmy Award. In May 2023, Martin received the 2023 National Association of TV Arts and Sciences Board of Governors Award.
