= Kim Lemon =

American TV broadcaster

- Education: Clarion University
- Occupations: Television journalist, news anchor (formerly)
- Years active: 1979-2021
- Employer(s): WGAL (Lancaster, PA)
- Spouse: John MacIver
- Children: Meg and Morgan
- Awards: 12 Mid Atlantic Awards; WGAL Hall of Fame (2022)

Kim Lemon (born 1957 or 1958) is a retired American TV journalist. She is known for her 42-year career at WGAL in Lancaster, Pennsylvania. She was a co-host for the TV show PM Magazine and was an evening news anchor from 1985 until her retirement in 2021.

== Early life and education ==
Lemon was born in 1957 or 1958 in Lancaster, Pennsylvania. Her parents are Dean Lemon, teacher and Christmas tree grower, and Shirley Lemon (née Pickell), also a teacher. Lemon is a ninth-generation descendent of Peter Lemon, who was granted 300 acres by William Penn. She has Amish and Mennonite heritage. Lemon graduated from Mannheim Township High School. She graduated from Clarion State College with a Bachelor of Science in Speech Communications and Theatre. In 1974, she studied African history and music at Kenya State Teacher's College in Nairobi. In 1977, she entered the Miss Pennsylvania contest. In 1978, she was a legislative assistant to David R. Wright.

== Career ==
Lemon joined WGAL in 1979 as a weekend weather reporter. Lemon credits Marijane Landis with helping her get a role. After working as a reporter and a news anchor, Lemon was named the first WGAL co-host of the nationally syndicated travel show "PM Magazine". In 1985, she transitioned to co-anchor for the evening news (News8 at 6).

Lemon led and anchored WGAL's coverage of the September 11 attacks, and took WGAL viewers to Washington, D.C. for the first time to witness the rebuilding of the Pentagon on the first anniversary of the 9/11 attacks; while there, she emceed a commemoration of the attacks. While covering a story in Lancaster County for its 300th anniversary, Lemon did a series of reports on genealogy and heritage about her deep roots in the Susquehanna Valley and surprised News 8 viewers by sharing she's related to about half of the Amish community from some extended family she met. She interviewed leaders of different faiths, including protected nuns and an imam.

On November 5, 2021, Lemon announced her retirement from WGAL online and on TV near the end of News 8 at 6 with her final broadcast set on the day before Thanksgiving. She retired from WGAL on November 24, 2021.

== Awards and recognition ==
Lemon returned to WGAL when she was interviewed as one of the women nominated for the Women of Distinction Life Skills of 2022. She returned to WGAL again to help celebrate the station's 75th anniversary with other former WGAL anchors.

== Personal life ==
In 1985, Lemon married John MacIver, who owned Oletowne Jewelers in Lancaster. MacIver was diagnosed with Lewy body dementia, and Lemon is an advocate for those diagnosed and their families. She has two children, Megan and Morgan.

Lemon enjoys cycling.
