= Jim Stone (sportscaster) =

American sportscaster

James "Jim" Stone is a retired American sports broadcaster who worked as sports director at KOMU in Columbia, Missouri, KOLO in Reno, Nevada, WGAL in Lancaster, Pennsylvania, and KNSD in San Diego, California.

== Early life ==
Stone grew up in Chicago, Illinois, and graduated from the University of Missouri-Columbia.

== Career ==
Stone was hired in 1981 by the NBC network affiliate WGAL in Lancaster, Pennsylvania, succeeding the retiring Dave Brandt a year later in 1982. Stone covered Penn State Nittany Lions football and attend both of the Nittany Lions' championship games. He worked with then Penn State head coach Joe Paterno in the booth for a Nittany Lions spring game.

Stone left WGAL in 1990 to work at KNSD, an NBC-owned and operated station in San Diego, California, as a sportscaster and reporter. He was also the play-by-play voice of San Diego State football and basketball, University of San Diego basketball, and the San Diego Sockers. Stone was laid off by KNSD in November 2009.
