= Jill Cordes =

American television personality

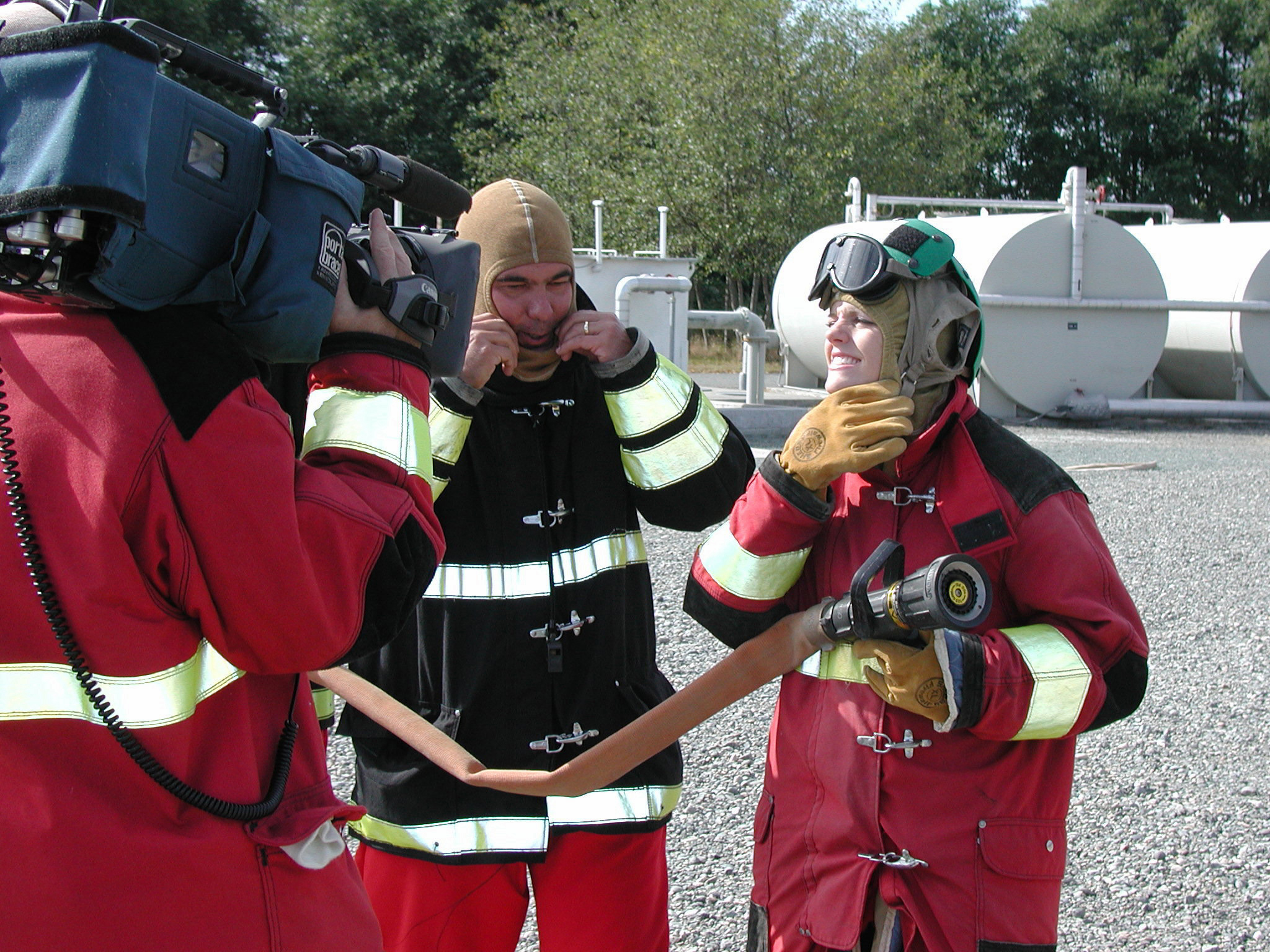
- Jill Cordes (right) at Naval Air Station Whidbey Island
- Born: December 29, 1969 (age 56); Pullman Washington, U.S.
- Occupation: Journalist
- Spouse: Phil Johnston

Jill Lynette Cordes (born December 29, 1969, in Pullman, Washington) is an American reporter and news anchor who writes the Fearless Feisty Mama blog for Parents Magazine. She began her television career as a reporter in Rapid City, South Dakota. She became a general assignment reporter for KSFY-TV in Sioux Falls, South Dakota, then served as the morning anchor at KETV in Omaha, Nebraska, and eventually to Minneapolis, Minnesota as a reporter for WCCO-TV. Cordes was one of the original four finalists to serve as co-host to Barbara Walters on The View in 1999. She was host of the award-winning show The Best Of, on the Food Network for six years, making an appearance on Oprah to talk about the show. She also hosted HGTV program My First Place for 2 years and appeared in a slew of other shows and webisodes including My First Baby.

She is a graduate of Penn State University, where she earned a Bachelor of Arts in journalism in 1992. She also earned a minor in political science.

Cordes lives with her husband Phil Johnston in Park Slope, Brooklyn after having lived on the Upper West Side of Manhattan.
