= Pat Principe =

American TV sportscaster

- Education: Ithaca College
- Occupation: Sports director (retired)
- Years active: 1976–2024
- Employer(s): WGAL (Lancaster, PA) (formerly)
- Spouse: Joanne Principe
- Children: 2
- Awards: 9 Mid-Atlantic Regional Emmy Award nominations; WGAL Hall of Fame (2024)

Pat Principe is an American television retired sportscaster. He worked for 41 years at the television station WGAL as its sports director, covering sports around the Susquehanna Valley until his retirement in 2024.

== Career ==
Principe worked from 1982 at WLYH in Pennsylvania as a sportscaster. He then moved to WGAL a year later in 1983, starting as a weekend sports anchor and reporter. In 1990, following the departure of his mentor, sports director and anchor Jim Stone, Principe got his big break when the station promoted him to sports director. In addition, he co-created, produced, and hosted WGAL's Football Friday.

Principe covered stories including Penn State Nittany Lions football at Pennsylvania State University, interviewing then head coach Joe Paterno and current head state coach James Franklin, covered eight Super Bowls and four World Series, reported on 24 Penn State bowl games since 1990, including four Rose Bowls, covered women's golf events in the Susquehanna Valley, including the Lady Keystone Open, the 2015 U.S. Women's Open, and the Philadelphia Eagles' football team's first Super Bowl win during Super Bowl LII in 2018.

On January 4, 2024, after covering his last Penn State Peach Bowl in Florida, PennLive reported that Principe would retire from WGAL in April 2024, after 41 years covering sports. He announced his retirement on WGAL in February 2024, to take effect in April. A day later, PennLive published that Bethany Miller would succeed him after he retires.

Principe retired on April 12, 2024.

== Personal life ==
Principe is married to his wife Joanne and the married couple has 2 children and five grandchildren.

== Awards and recognition ==
At his college, where he started his first broadcast job, he was named Sportscaster of the Year in his Senior Year. At WGAL, he was nominated nine times for the Mid-Atlantic Regional Emmy Awards. Principe also received several Associated Press awards for sports coverage, sportscasts, and Football Friday. He was honored in Florida by the Penn State Peach Bowl for covering Penn State for 33 seasons.
