= Nelson Sears =

American broadcaster (1926–2021)

Nelson Sears

Nelson Sears (1926–2021) was an American television broadcaster. He reported news and weather for the television station WGAL in Lancaster, Pennsylvania. Later on, he became a program manager.

== Early life ==
Sears was born in 1926. According to Sears, he was raised in York, Pennsylvania. His father died when Sears was five years old, and Sears was raised by his blind mother. In 1943, aged 17, he joined the United States Navy during World War II. He participated in the Normandy landings but never landed because a mine struck his boat. Later, he served in the Pacific Ocean and participated in the Battle of Okinawa.

== Career ==
After being discharged in 1947, Sears studied at the American Television Institute in Chicago. He joined WGAL in January 1949, two months before the television station first went on the air. He worked as a news anchor, weather reporter, reporter, program director, and promotions manager. Sears was promoted to program manager in 1966 and remained a full-time anchor until about 1977. He returned to the air for large events such as the Three Mile Island accident in 1979. The Intelligencer Journal says Sears brought The Oak Ridge Boys to mainstream appeal when he sent a tape to Mike Douglas.

Sears retired from WGAL in 1994 after 45 years. He returned to WGAL in March 2009 for its 60 year anniversary special. In December 2016, Sears was inducted into the WGAL Hall of Fame.

== Personal life and death ==
Sears had a wife named Sara. He had two sons, Randall and Russell. As of 1994 he had two granddaughters.

Sears was a chairman of the board of directors of the American Red Cross, Lancaster County Chapter. Sears was a chair of the Urban League of Lancaster County. He was a trustee of Millersville University.

Sears died in December 2021, at the age of 95.
