= 225 Broadway (San Diego) =

Office building in San Diego, California

Coordinates: 32°42′56″N 117°9′44″W

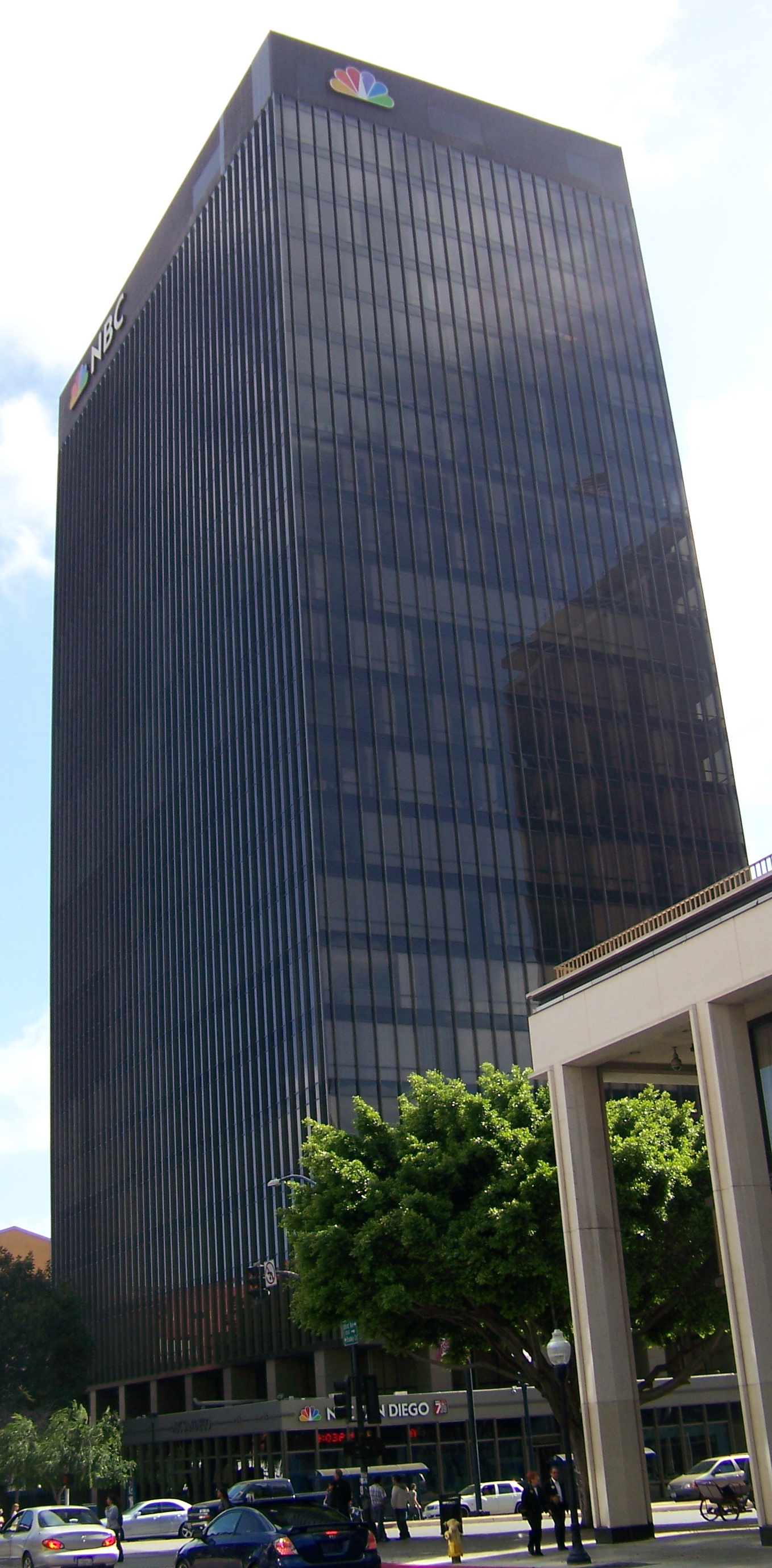
- April 2009
- Interactive map of the 225 Broadway area

General information
- Type: Office
- Location: San Diego, California
- Completed: 1975

Height
- Antenna spire: None
- Roof: 306 ft (93 m)

Technical details
- Floor count: 22

Design and construction
- Architect: Architects Mosher Drew Watson Ferguson

References
- San Diego Architecture American Institute of Architects Guidebook

225 Broadway is the 41st tallest building in San Diego, California, and is a prominent fixture in San Diego's skyline. The 23-story skyscraper has a height of 306 ft (93 m) and is located in the Horton Plaza district of downtown San Diego and was home to the area NBC owned-and-operated station KNSD from 2001 until 2016, during which time it was known as the NBC Building and bore NBC signage. The skyscraper is built to the International Style.

== History ==
The building was purchased by American Assets in 2004 for $95.5 million.

== See also ==
- List of tallest buildings in San Diego
