= David Brandt =

David Brandt may refer to:

- David Brandt (American football) (born 1977), American football player
- David Brandt (farmer) (1946–2023), American farmer
- David Brandt (politician) (fl. 1990s–2020s), politician from Montserrat
- Dave Brandt (fl. 1980s–2020s), American soccer coach
- Dave Brandt (sportscaster) (1919–2007)
