= Millersville, Pennsylvania =

Borough in Pennsylvania, US

Millersville, Pennsylvania Millerschteddel (Pennsylvania German)
- Borough
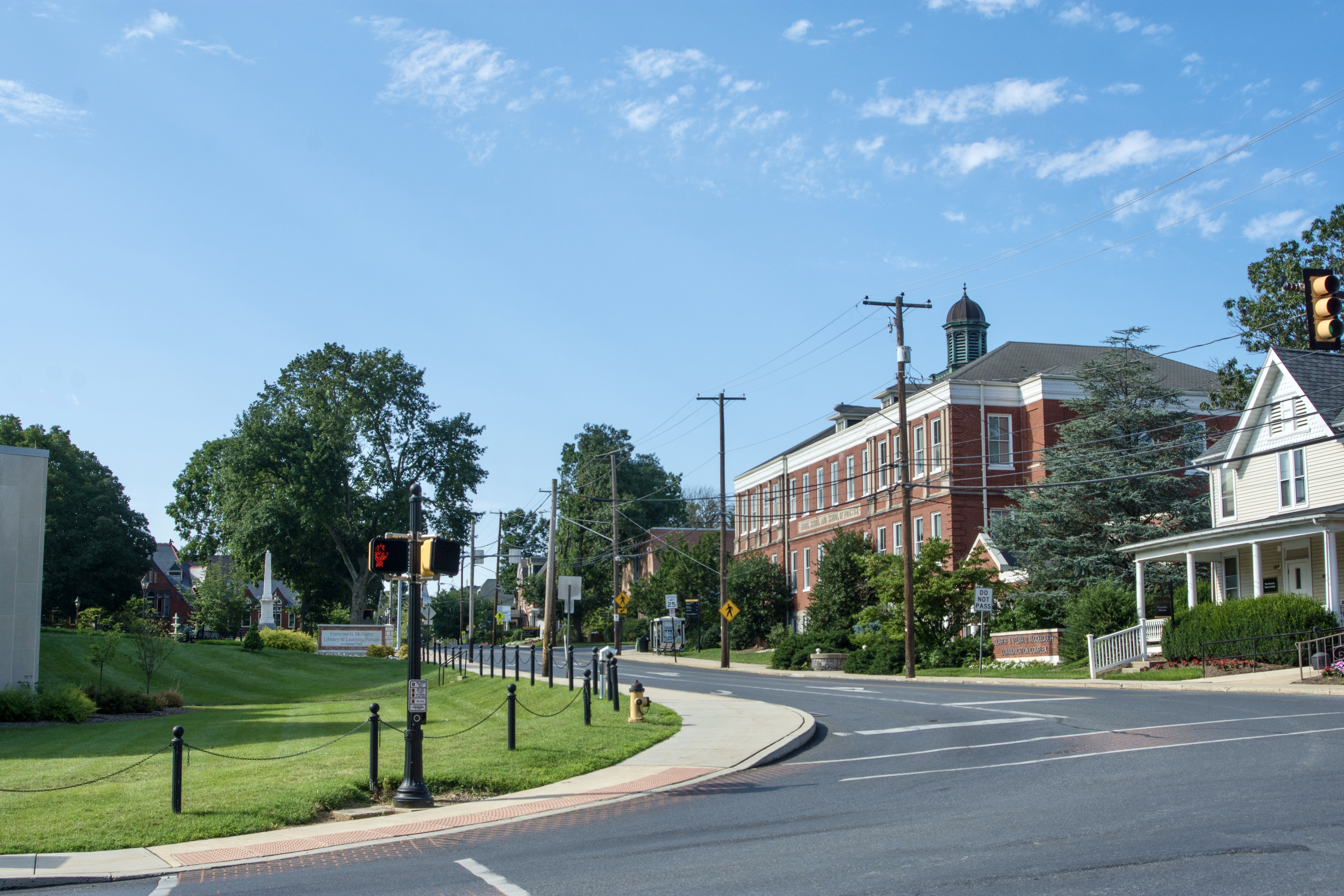
- The intersection of Frederick Street and N. George Street in Millersville, Pennsylvania.
- Etymology: John Miller
- Location of Millersville in Lancaster County, Pennsylvania

- Location in Pennsylvania Location in the United States
- Coordinates: 40°00′22″N 76°21′05″W
- Country: United States
- State: Pennsylvania
- County: Lancaster

Government
  - Mayor: David T. Aichele (R)

Area
  - Total: 1.94 sq mi (5.03 km^{2})
  - Land: 1.93 sq mi (5.01 km^{2})
  - Water: 0.0077 sq mi (0.02 km^{2})
- Elevation: 315 ft (96 m)

Population (2020)
  - Total: 7,903
  - Density: 4,087.5/sq mi (1,578.21/km^{2})
- Time zone: UTC-5 (EST)
  - Summer (DST): UTC-4 (EDT)
- ZIP Code: 17551
- Area codes: 717 and 223
- FIPS code: 42-49728
- Website: www.millersvilleborough.org

Millersville (Pennsylvania German: Millerschteddel or Millerschtadt) is a borough in Lancaster County, Pennsylvania, United States. At the 2020 census, the population was 7,629 and in 2021 it was estimated at 7,593. Millersville is home to Millersville University of Pennsylvania.

== History ==
Originally farmland in then Manor Township owned by John Miller, Millerstown was a crossroads for goods and sales brought from the local farming communities into Lancaster City. Later the town's name was changed to "Millersville", and it was incorporated as a separate borough in Lancaster County. Millersville is the location of the first teachers' academy in the state, established in 1854. Later, in 1855, it was chartered as a state normal school, and presently is Millersville University of Pennsylvania, which is part of the Pennsylvania State System of Higher Education.

== Geography ==
It is 4 miles (6 km) southwest of Lancaster, the county seat.

According to the U.S. Census Bureau, Millersville has a total area of 1.94 square miles (5.02 km^{2}), of which 0.008 square miles (0.021 km^{2}), or 0.41%, are water. A small portion of the southern border of the borough touches the Conestoga River, a tributary of the Susquehanna. Millersville University is in the southern part of the borough.

== Demographics ==
Historical population
Census	Pop.	Note	%±
1850	498		—
1860	947		90.2%
1870	1,180		24.6%
1880	1,121		−5.0%
1890	1,241		10.7%
1940	1,867		—
1950	2,551		36.6%
1960	3,883		52.2%
1970	6,396		64.7%
1980	7,668		19.9%
1990	8,099		5.6%
2000	7,774		−4.0%
2010	8,168		5.1%
2020	7,903		−3.2%
2023 (est.)	9,252	▲	17.1%

At the 2000 census there were 7,774 people, 2,335 households, and 1,272 families living in the borough. The population density was 3,811.4 people per square mile (1,471.6 people/km^{2}). There were 2,469 housing units at an average density of 1,210.5 per square mile (467.4/km^{2}). The racial makeup of the borough was 92.45% White, 4.31% African American, 0.06% Native American, 1.12% Asian, 0.08% Pacific Islander, 0.98% from other races, and 1.00% from two or more races. Hispanic or Latino of any race were 2.55%.

There were 2,335 households, 19.4% had children under the age of 18 living with them, 45.4% were married couples living together, 6.6% had a female householder with no husband present, and 45.5% were non-families. 29.7% of households were made up of individuals, and 14.5% were one person aged 65 or older. The average household size was 2.27 and the average family size was 2.74.

The age distribution was 10.9% under the age of 18, 45.0% from 18 to 24, 15.4% from 25 to 44, 13.9% from 45 to 64, and 14.9% 65 or older. The median age was 22 years. For every 100 females, there were 83.7 males. For every 100 females age 18 and over, there were 82.1 males.

The median household income was $38,425 and the median family income was $53,110. Males had a median income of $36,327 versus $25,636 for females. The per capita income for the borough was $15,773. About 3.7% of families and 16.4% of the population were below the poverty line, including 10.2% of those under age 18 and 6.8% of those age 65 or over.

== Notable people ==
- Marijane Landis (1928–2015), television producer and host (WGAL-TV); creator of the children's television shows Percy Platypus and His Friends (1955–1974) and Sunshine Corners (1974–1979)
