= KNSD =

Television station in San Diego

- San Diego, California; United States
- Channels: Digital: 17 (UHF), shared with KUAN-LD; Virtual: 39
- Branding: NBC 7 San Diego; NBC 7 News

Programming
- Affiliations: 39.1: NBC; for others, see § Subchannels

Ownership
- Owner: NBC Owned Television Stations; (Station Venture Operations, LP)
- Sister stations: KUAN-LD

History
- First air date: November 14, 1965
- Former call signs: KAAR (1965–1968); KCST (1968–1975); KCST-TV (1975–1988)
- Former channel numbers: Analog: 39 (UHF, 1965–2009); Digital: 40 (UHF, 1999–2019)
- Former affiliations: Independent (1965–1973); ABC (1973–1977)
- Call sign meaning: "News San Diego" (former news branding)

Technical information
- Licensing authority: FCC
- Facility ID: 35277
- ERP: 387 kW
- HAAT: 577 m (1,893 ft)
- Transmitter coordinates: 32°41′48.7″N 116°56′9.2″W

Links
- Public license information: Public file; LMS
- Website: www.nbcsandiego.com

KNSD (channel 39, cable channel 7), branded as NBC 7 San Diego, is a television station in San Diego, California, United States. It is owned and operated by the NBC television network via its NBC Owned Television Stations division. Under common ownership with Poway-licensed Telemundo station KUAN-LD (channel 48), both stations share studio facilities on Granite Ridge Drive in the Kearny Mesa section of San Diego and are broadcast from the same transmitter on San Miguel Mountain, southeast of Spring Valley.

Channel 39 began broadcasting November 14, 1965, as KAAR from studios in Kearny Mesa. Owned by locally based San Diego Telecasters, it was the third television station in San Diego and its first independent station. As the first ultra high frequency (UHF) station in San Diego, it struggled to attract viewers and advertisers; at one point, it cut back its schedule to two hours a night, and when it was sold to Bass Brothers Enterprises in 1967, it went off the air for nearly six months, returning as KCST with an emphasis on local sports coverage.

Shortly after the relaunch, ownership began a quest to force ABC to affiliate with channel 39. This was possible because ABC needed annual approval from the Federal Communications Commission (FCC) to feed network programming to XETV, across the Mexican border in Tijuana, and the FCC had provided this because San Diego lacked a third commercial station. A multi-year legal battle ended in 1972 with the FCC directing ABC to affiliate with KCST, which it did in 1973. Concurrent with the new network affiliation, the station launched a local news department and was sold to Storer Broadcasting. In 1976, after finding itself suddenly in first place in the national ratings, ABC sought an upgrade and agreed to move its programming to KGTV; channel 39 affiliated with NBC instead. KCST remained mired in third place in the local news ratings throughout this time period.

In 1988, after being purchased by Gillett Communications, KCST was relaunched with new KNSD call letters and an overhauled news department. The changes did not have an immediate ratings impact, but as the 1990s wore on, KNSD became more competitive particularly in late news ratings. NBC acquired KNSD from New World Communications in 1996. In 2001, KNSD moved its studios to the downtown 225 Broadway office tower, returning to Kearny Mesa in 2016. NBC brought the Telemundo affiliation in San Diego in-house in 2017, resulting in a further expansion to the news department.

== Early history ==
=== KAAR: Construction and early years ===
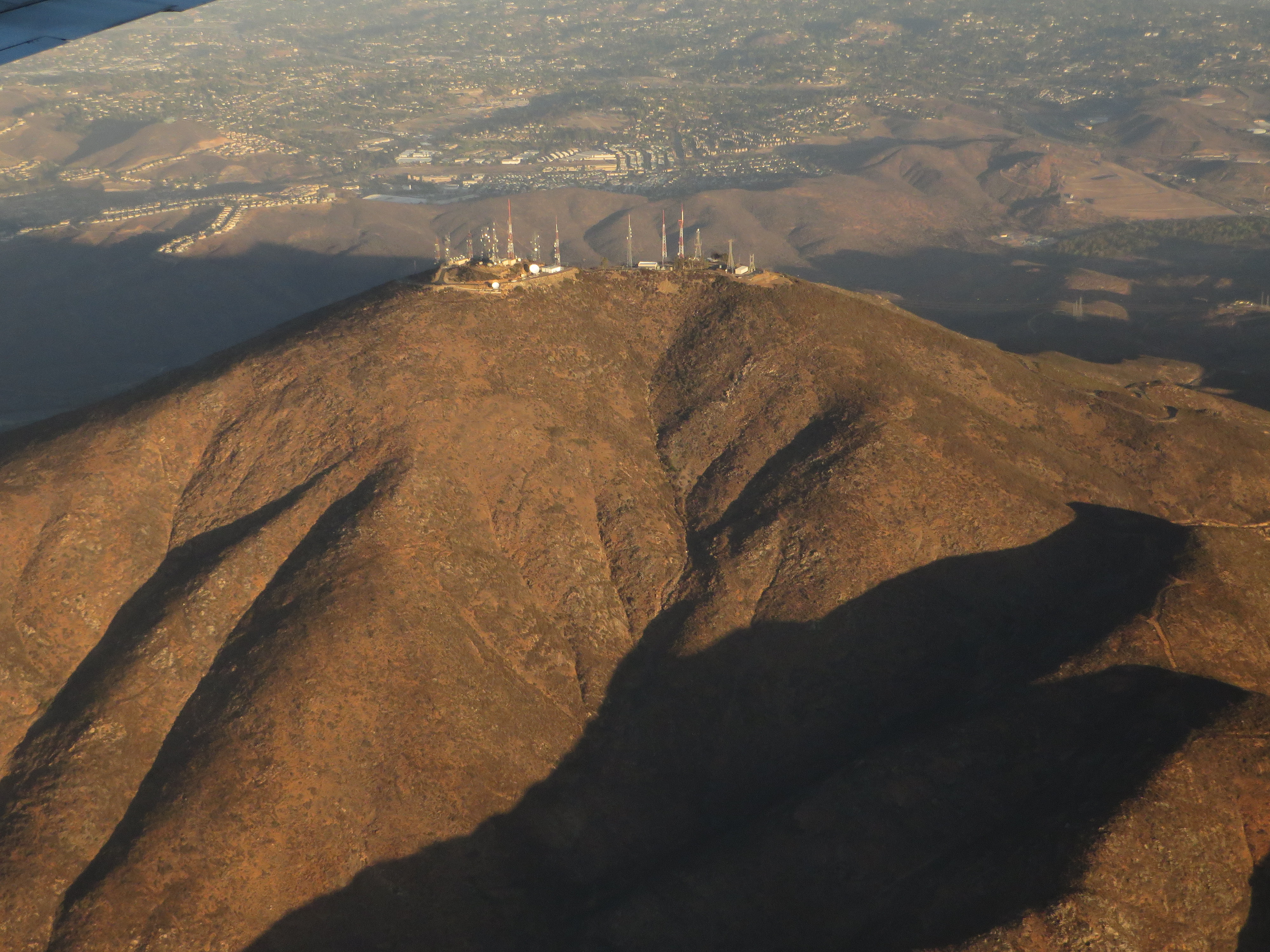
KAAR was the first station to broadcast from atop San Miguel Mountain.

San Diego Telecasters, Inc., filed with the Federal Communications Commission (FCC) on June 17, 1963, to build a new television station on ultra high frequency (UHF) channel 39 in San Diego. The applicant was owned by Larry Shushan and Leon Kahn, the president and co-owner of San Diego radio station KPRI-FM. Shushan and Kahn proposed to build channel 39 on San Miguel Mountain. The FCC approved this application on June 25, 1964, by which time preparations were under way on the transmitter site. Construction required building a road to the mountain's summit, a task that delayed the planned sign-on for the new station. A late delivery of an antenna from General Electric also set back work. In October 1965, the antenna was installed, and the station formally opened its studios on Engineer Road in Kearny Mesa.

KAAR began broadcasting on November 14, 1965. It was an independent station, San Diego's first, with a 12-hour broadcast day featuring color movies in prime time, shows for children (Suzy Mallery's Kaartoon-O-Rama) and teenagers (Kaar A Go Go). This format was not a success. In August 1966, citing a lack of advertising, KAAR cut its broadcast day to 7 to 9 p.m. from Monday to Saturday, carrying the same movie every night in the first week of its curtailed operation. The station later moved to a 7 to 10 p.m. schedule.

On January 16, 1967, educational television came to the San Diego area with the launch of instructional programming from the San Diego Instructional Television Authority, a consortium of 26 local school districts. The educational station in San Diego, KEBS-TV (channel 15), was not yet in operation, so the programs were aired by channel 39 during daytime hours under a contract with KEBS-TV's owner, San Diego State College. KAAR restored much of its lost broadcast day after the shift, instituting a late-afternoon children's block, a nightly talk show covering local issues, and a 9:30 p.m. newscast. KEBS-TV began test broadcasting on June 12 and supplanted KAAR as the broadcaster of educational television programming.

=== KCST: Bass Brothers ownership and sports format ===
San Diego Telecasters filed to sell KAAR to Bass Brothers Enterprises on June 23, 1967, for $1.1 million. The sale was approved and the station authorized to go silent effective August 31. The station was placed under a Bass subsidiary, Western Telecasters. During this time, the new owners recast the station with new KCST call letters and a format heavy on sports. KCST returned to air on February 2, 1968; the highlight of its first day on air was live coverage of a game between the San Diego Rockets and San Francisco Warriors. The station had a package of six total Rockets games as well as 13 San Diego Gulls games. Former KOGO-TV (channel 10) sports director Bob Chandler, former KOGO-TV newscaster Bill Fouch, and Mike Smith served as the announcers for a wide slate of sports events. Chandler and Fouch hosted two sports and news updates at 7 and 10 p.m. nightly; the station built a large scoreboard to present half-hourly score updates. In addition to sports, the station had a nightly interview show and teen dance program.

Within three months of signing on, the new KCST secured rights to three more San Diego sports teams, including eight games of the Pacific Coast League San Diego Padres baseball team and San Diego State Aztecs football replays. That March, channel 39 signed a deal to become the official station of the San Diego Chargers football team, airing live preseason road games, a weekly coaches' show, and highlight packages. The relationship with the Chargers extended beyond sports broadcasts. When the Chargers drafted cornerback Jim Hill that year, he was assigned number 39 on account of the KCST pact; he hosted a variety show, Mr. 39 Talent Time, and conducted interviews. Between February 1968 and March 1969, KCST grew from having just eight to ten employees to a staff of 45, and Bass's broadcasting division moved its corporate office from Texas to San Diego.

The San Diego Padres of Major League Baseball were established in 1969 and had no local television broadcasts that first season. For 1970, KCST purchased rights to 20 road game telecasts from KOGO. That July, it increased its effective radiated power to 4.2 million watts, increasing signal quality. To address one remaining area shaded by terrain, a translator was built at La Jolla.

== ABC affiliation dispute and sale to Storer ==
In November 1968, Western Telecasters petitioned the FCC, starting a quest to force ABC to affiliate with it. At the time, there were three commercial stations licensed to San Diego: KCST and two very high frequency (VHF) stations, KFMB-TV (channel 8) and KOGO-TV, affiliated with CBS and NBC, respectively. However, a fourth station served San Diego from across the Mexican border: XETV (channel 6). Beginning in 1955, the FCC annually granted ABC permission to feed network programming to XETV. This grant was made at the time, per the FCC, because at the time there was "no operating or authorized third television station in the San Diego area" to provide a third major network even though XETV had minimal local programming for San Diego audiences. KCST argued that it was the third station, it would do a better job than XETV at providing local programming, and it was available to become the ABC affiliate, rendering the reason for the original grants moot. In the petition, Western Telecasters revealed that it had lost $650,000 running KCST between February and November 1968 in spite of a $1.36 million expenditure on improvements to the station. By 1970, its losses had widened to $1 million a year. ABC had argued, for its part, that it was already losing money and could not afford an additional $1 million in annual projected losses from a forced affiliation switch.

After the matter was designated for hearing in 1969, FCC hearing examiner James F. Tierney ruled in an initial decision in May 1971 that the ABC affiliation with XETV was in the public interest because of XETV's superior technical facility compared with KCST. Tierney found that, were ABC to move from channel 6 to channel 39, the network—already in third place in ratings—would lose coverage in 26,000 to 29,000 television households and advertising revenue, impairing its competitive standing. He ruled in favor of preserving the ABC network service and its benefits to San Diego over local service improvements that KCST could make over XETV. Western Telecasters appealed Tierney's ruling to the full FCC, which reversed the initial decision on May 30, 1972, and ruled against renewing ABC's ability to provide network programming to XETV. The commission agreed with KCST's contention that the initial rationale for the annual authorization no longer existed with a third commercial TV station in San Diego itself and found that "as an ABC affiliate, KCST's programming would meet the needs and interests of the community more effectively than the existing ABC affiliate", XETV, which had "not produced a local news program since 1967, does not contemplate resumption of one, and has never interrupted its broadcast schedule for a bulletin of local interest". It also found that the network would lose 22,500 homes as compared to a previous figure of 29,000—a figure the commission deemed "minimal"—and noted that XETV was subject to potential Mexican censorship. The effect of this ruling was to essentially force ABC to affiliate with KCST.

A challenge in the United States Court of Appeals for the District of Columbia Circuit by ABC and XETV was denied in January 1973; the Court of Appeals found that the FCC had acted within its authority. ABC and XETV then signed a memorandum of understanding and proposed to the FCC that the network continue with the Tijuana station until July 1, subject to negotiating an affiliation agreement with KCST. Just after prevailing in its fight for the ABC affiliation, Western Telecasters agreed in March 1973 to sell KCST to Storer Broadcasting for $12 million after Storer unexpectedly made an offer for the station. Mel Wheeler, president of Western Telecasters, noted "mixed feelings" on the sale but found the offer "difficult to resist". The deal would make Storer the first group to own the then-maximum complement of five VHF and two UHF television stations. News of the transaction prompted XETV to declare the previously agreed memorandum of understanding void and resume its affiliation fight, which ended when the Supreme Court of the United States rejected XETV's final appeal in June 1973.

KCST began airing ABC daytime programming on June 4, 1973, and the network's prime time schedule on July 1. In advance of the affiliation switch, the station started building out a full-service news department. The station selected the Eyewitness News format for its newscasts and named Harold Greene, a reporter and anchor at KABC-TV in Los Angeles and native San Diegan, as news director. Newscasts at 5 and 11 p.m. debuted on July 16, 1973, with Greene as the lead weeknight anchor. Despite the station winning two regional Golden Mike Awards for news coverage, Greene resigned after six months because he was in conflict with station staff; he sought to grow the news staff at a faster rate than station management. After Greene left, in April 1974, KCST named Carol Ann Hutchison as a news anchor, making her the first woman to anchor a local evening newscast in San Diego. Another anchor at KCST during this time, from 1973 to 1976, was Lou Waters, later of CNN.

== Storer ownership ==
Though the sale of KCST to Storer was announced in March 1973 and a contract formally signed that June, the local chapter of the National Organization for Women (NOW) petitioned the FCC to deny the transaction. It alleged that Storer discriminated against women in hiring to such a manner that the company's promises to hire women and minorities could not be trusted and that Storer owned cable systems in KCST's coverage area, creating a then-impermissible overlap. Storer and NOW reached an agreement under which Storer committed to hire more women in top-level positions, fund scholarships for women, and devote 12 primetime programs to women's issues in its first two years of ownership. The FCC approved the transaction in September 1974 but warned NOW that a licensee's discretion could override such agreements and could not "curtail" its responsibility for station operations.

In 1975, KCST's newscasts were rebranded from Eyewitness News to 39 News Alive; at that time, Charlie Jones joined as an occasional sports commentator and Regis Philbin as entertainment editor, in addition to his role at KABC-TV.

=== Affiliation switch to NBC ===
I remember my first day at the station. I went to a fire in Southeast San Diego, and a little kid came up to me. He wanted to know why the educational channel was covering a fire.

— Tom Mitchell, KCST reporter and later news director, on joining channel 39 in 1976

Midway through the 1975–76 television season, ABC experienced a major upswing in ratings nationally. The increase was so significant that it propelled KCST-TV to first place in prime time, beating KFMB-TV and KGTV in share in the February 1976 Arbitron sweeps period. It was the first time a UHF station had beaten two network-affiliated VHFs in its market. However, ABC was still smarting from the 1973 move to KCST, which had been forced upon it, and was interested in moving back to a VHF station. As early as late 1974, ABC was in discussions with McGraw-Hill, owner of KGTV, about moving its San Diego affiliation. McGraw-Hill, in turn, looked favorably at ABC's younger audience. On June 3, 1976, ABC and McGraw-Hill announced that KGTV would become the new ABC affiliate in San Diego, a move that an NBC spokesman stated left the network "stunned". ABC noted that the decision was not a reflection on KCST's performance but born of the need to continually improve the network's affiliate base. NBC initially showed resistance to the idea of letting KGTV switch networks before its existing NBC affiliation agreement expired in November 1977, even though ABC had already sent a six-month termination notice to KCST-TV.

In September 1976, Storer announced that an affiliation agreement between KCST and NBC was imminent. It also divulged plans to switch the Storer station in Milwaukee, WITI, from ABC to CBS. Though Storer executive vice president Terry Lee claimed that the Milwaukee move was about associating with CBS—of which Storer owned three other major-market affiliates and which Storer regarded like "family"—and stated that the move was not being made "out of spite", he admitted, "Obviously, we had no good feelings about ABC after what they did to us in San Diego." ABC vice president Dick Beesemyer, noting that WITI was number-one as an ABC affiliate in that market, believed that the deal was motivated by factors other than performance. The parties reached a compromise: on June 27, 1977, KCST-TV became an NBC affiliate, and KGTV became an ABC affiliate.

KCST-TV complemented the affiliation switch with major changes in its local news offerings. Channel 39's newscasts were retitled NewsCenter 39, with two new presenters for news and weather, and the early local news was moved to 6:30 p.m. Ron Fortner, who had anchored the KCST news for three years, was dismissed; management felt he was not a match for the new name and format designed to complement the NBC Nightly News, apparently on the advice of a consultant. The news department won critical acclaim and was the first San Diego station to win consecutive Golden Mike Awards for best newscast competing against the Los Angeles stations, and the station's news audience share quadrupled from 3 to 12% between 1977 and 1981. In two ratings periods in 1979, KCST was second at 11 p.m. In 1981, a 5 p.m. newscast was reinstated; a 4:30 p.m. local newscast consisting of several minutes of local news leading into a live segment of CNN2 was introduced the following year.

The changes did little to change KCST-TV's overall news ratings performance, which was generally third place, well behind KFMB or KGTV. The station continued to suffer from a comparative lack of viewer loyalty as a UHF station as well as the 20-year head-start that KFMB and KGTV enjoyed as news outlets. During this period, the station had unusually little on-air turnover in spite of the low ratings and a revolving door of news directors. Lead anchors Dennis Morgino and Laura Buxton remained a team from 1981 through 1987; Mark Sauer of The San Diego Union called their tenure "remarkable" given the circumstances. Station staffers felt that Storer did not invest sufficiently in KCST. During this time, Bill Ritter joined the channel 39 staff as a financial reporter.

=== KKR buyout and attempted sale to Lorimar ===
Storer Communications was taken private in a $1.6 billion leveraged buyout by Kohlberg Kravis Roberts (KKR), a merchant banker. Completed in December 1985, the buyout was engineered to thwart a hostile takeover by Comcast and an attempted liquidation of the company by dissatisfied shareholders. KKR had purchased Wometco Enterprises the previous year, after no succession plan was found following the death of chairman Mitchell Wolfson, and began the process of dismantling the conglomerate. Wometco already owned several television stations in markets where Storer owned cable systems, including WTVJ in Miami, and owned a cable system in Atlanta where Storer owned WAGA-TV; the FCC's approval was conditional on KKR divesting in these overlapping markets.

KKR originally planned to only sell WTVJ but soon entertained offers for some of the Storer stations. On May 21, 1986, Lorimar-Telepictures, producer of Dallas, Knots Landing and Falcon Crest for CBS, agreed to purchase the Storer stations, production company, advertising sales division, Washington news bureau, and WTVJ for $1.85 billion. This deal collapsed by late October 1986 when Lorimar asked to have WTVJ excluded. Initially attributed to issues financing the deal and reduced cash flow estimates for WTVJ, it was later revealed that CBS president Laurence Tisch objected to Lorimar purchasing a significant portion of the affiliate base and threatened to disaffiliate all the CBS affiliates in the deal.

== Gillett and New World ownership ==
In 1987, George N. Gillett Jr. acquired majority control of the Storer stations; the $1.3 billion deal was financed through junk bonds and represented a valuation of nearly 15 times cash flow for the group. KKR maintained a 45-percent minority ownership. To satisfy federal regulations, Gillett's existing station group was spun off to Busse Broadcasting, a company formed by Gillett employees. As the sale was pending, the era of third-place stability ended at KCST-TV. In 1987, Morgino and Buxton were replaced by Marty Levin and Denise Yamada. Levin was the first person to be a lead anchor at each of channels 8, 10, and 39 and had just been demoted at KFMB; Yamada had been a reporter for ABC's Good Morning America. In spite of the new anchor team, KCST remained at the back of the San Diego news ratings. In the May 1988 sweeps period, it had less than half the viewers of either KFMB or KGTV at 5 p.m. and tied KFMB for a distant second at 11 p.m.

=== KNSD: News San Diego and a total overhaul ===
This TV station has had a very low profile. It needs to have the volume turned up.

— Neil Derrough, general manager, KNSD, on the 1988 image overhaul

After the Gillett purchase concluded, larger changes were seen on the horizon. Gillett's focus on news was predicted to bolster the news department. The company named a new general manager—Neil Derrough, former president of the CBS owned-and-operated stations group—who sought to fix the station's major image problems. Some stemmed from the UHF status, mostly a crutch by this point. The San Diego Business Journal called NewsCenter 39 "matronly", while Derrough considered its newscasts "bland, predictable, and not very interesting".

Coinciding with the opening night of NBC's coverage of the 1988 Summer Olympics, on September 15, 1988, KCST-TV changed its call sign to KNSD; began promoting its cable channel number of 7 over its over-the-air channel 39; (Note: KCST-TV had been moved to channel 7 by both major San Diego–area cable systems over the course of 1983, with others following suit by 1988.) and retitled its newscasts News San Diego. It launched a series of new programs: a monthly show hosted by former KFMB-TV personality Larry Himmel, a sports show with then–San Diego Chargers head coach Al Saunders, and two new public affairs series. The Himmel program lasted just six months before it was canceled due to low ratings.

The revamped KNSD newscasts proved more competitive at 11 p.m., but ratings continued to lag in the early evening news. In September 1989, the early evening news hour at 5 p.m. was split into half-hour 5 and 6 p.m. newscasts, a different format than KFMB and KGTV had at the time. That same year, channel 39 hired former San Diego Chargers linebacker Jim Laslavic as its new sports director—a position in which he would spend nearly 30 years—and debuted a sports talk show featuring Lee "Hacksaw" Hamilton, a local sports radio personality. Ritter, who had been reassigned as an investigative reporter when the news department was relaunched, departed at the end of 1989 for KTTV in Los Angeles.

The 1990 promotion of Irv Kass to the position of news director was credited with stabilizing the typical revolving door of on-air talent and strengthening the channel 39 newsroom, but the station continued to add air talent and experiment. In 1991, KNSD began airing an afternoon local talk show, The Ross/Hedgecock Report. It paired Allison Ross, a former KFMB-TV anchor, with Roger Hedgecock, a former San Diego mayor then hosting a talk show on KSDO radio. The program was canceled after 15 months due to low ratings, particularly as the popular The Oprah Winfrey Show aired on KGTV in the same time slot. It was replaced months later by a new 4 p.m. newscast, anchored by Ross. In 1993, Rolland Smith, a news anchor with a lengthy career in New York, moved to San Diego to anchor the 4 p.m. news when Ross was taken off the program. That year, the station also started a weekend morning newscast.

Over the course of the early- to mid-1990s, KNSD's news ratings increased, particularly at 11 p.m. While KGTV had been winning the late news ratings race for years, KNSD posted major increases in ratings during 1995 and moved ahead of KGTV in 1996. In early 1996, KNSD launched a morning newscast, originally 90 minutes from 5:30 to 7 a.m.

=== Ownership instability ===
During much of the late 1980s and early 1990s, the ownership future of channel 39 seemed uncertain. Gillett's purchase of the Storer stations, renamed SCI Television, was troubled from the start. The junk bonds were raised prior to Black Monday: by November 1987, Gillett recorded a 10:1 debt-to-profit ratio and faced a $153 million loan payment by October 1989. Rumors of a sale ran hot in the lead-up to the conversion to News San Diego in 1988, particularly as Gillett, who formerly had a role with the Miami Dolphins, expressed interest in buying the Seattle Seahawks. At one point, KGTV reported that Westinghouse Broadcasting was under contract to buy channel 39, which turned out to be premature. Gillett boasted that the sale of WSMV-TV in Nashville, Tennessee, was enough to shore up the company's finances, but the firm missed the October 1989 loan payment, prompting three creditors to ask the United States Bankruptcy Court in Delaware that SCI Television be placed in involuntary Chapter 7 bankruptcy while SCI offered a debt for equity exchange. This exchange offer was agreed to within hours of a deadline placed by the Delaware court. Bondholders acquired a 39-percent stake in SCI, while Gillett saw his ownership reduced to 41 percent and KKR's reduced to 15 percent; KKR also cancelled a $190 million debit note held on SCI. Gillett failed to meet a debt payment by August 1990, prompting S&P Global Ratings to lower the rating for Gillett Holdings from a C to a D.

Gillett's financial pressures continued to mount after the sale of WMAR-TV in Baltimore was renegotiated to a lower price and a Denver bankruptcy judge denied any further extensions on a Chapter 11 filing. The early 1990s recession also negatively impacted television station cash flow and advertising revenue, on top of Gillett's failure to divest assets prior to a decline in station valuation. Facing lawsuits from multiple creditors including Apollo Partners, Allstate and Fidelity Investments, Gillett Holdings filed for Chapter 11 on July 26, 1991. After reaching another agreement with bondholders, Gillett Holdings was restructured in January 1992, with Gillett as a minority owner but maintaining day-to-day operational control.

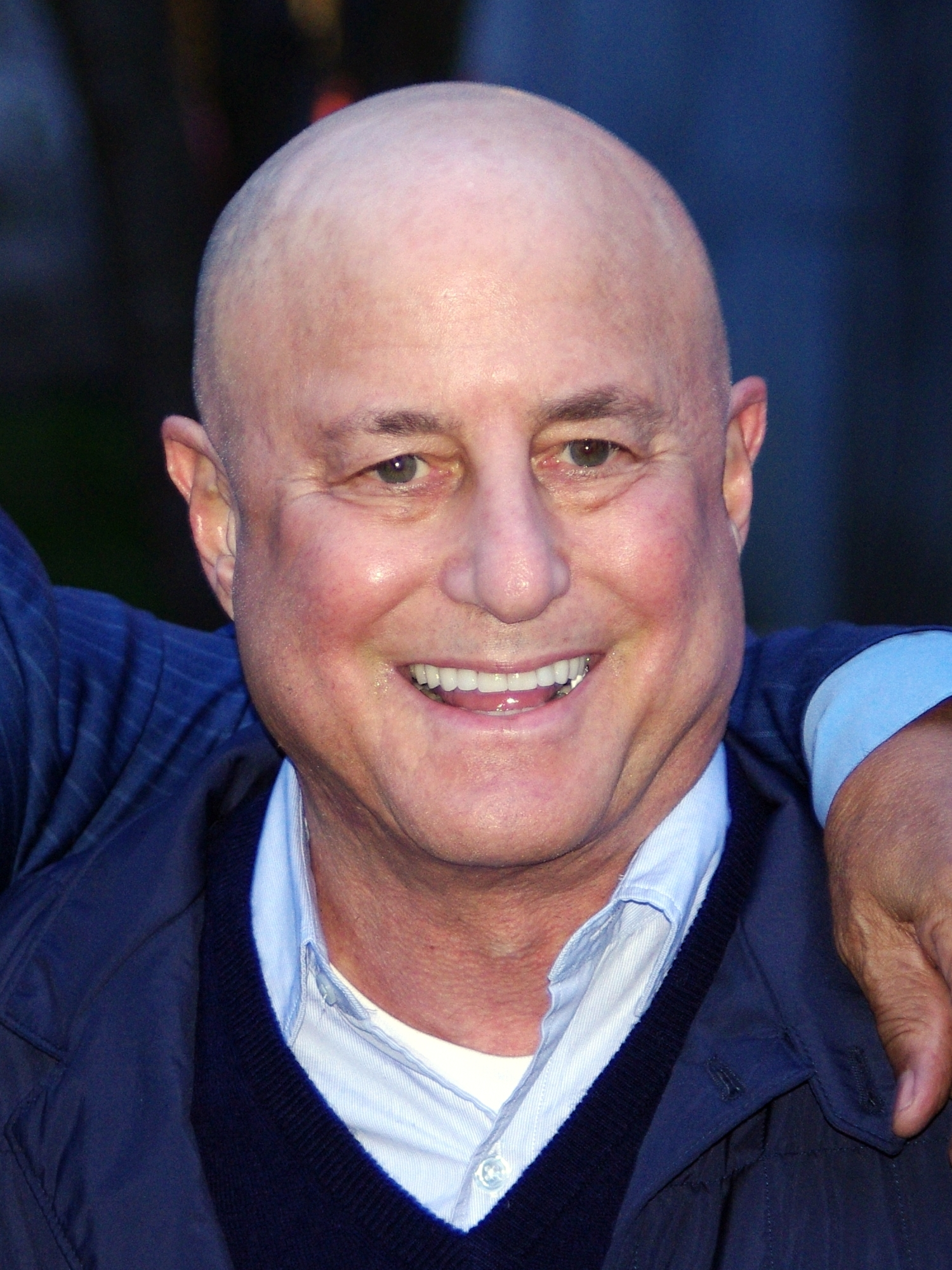
Ronald Perelman

Investor Ronald Perelman, regarded as a corporate raider and the owner of Revlon and Marvel Entertainment, purchased majority control of SCI Television, including KNSD, on February 17, 1993, pushing Gillett out entirely. The transaction came through a bankruptcy court-approved Chapter 11 reorganization: Perelman's holding company MacAndrews & Forbes made a $100 million investment in SCI, which was still burdened by $1.3 billion in debt, in exchange for 53 percent of its equity. After the deal closed, SCI was folded into Perelman's New World Entertainment and renamed New World Communications. This was one of several deals Perelman made in rapid succession, as he then purchased a stake in Genesis Entertainment via Four Star Television and directly purchased infomercial producer Guthy-Renker.

KNSD was excluded from the deal made between the Fox network and New World Communications on May 23, 1994, that saw New World agree to convert 12 affiliates of ABC, CBS, and NBC to Fox. John Freeman of the San Diego Union-Tribune hypothesized that Fox wanted to keep XETV, one of its stronger affiliates and a VHF station, over KNSD. The deal, nonetheless, had nearly immediate consequences. Because New World was under contract to acquire more stations than it could legally own (twelve), KNSD was identified as a prime target for a sale. Unsure of her employer's future, Denise Yamada left KNSD to anchor at KFMB-TV, reportedly on the condition that she earn more money than her former co-anchor Levin. New World briefly put KNSD on the market at an asking price of $150 million before withdrawing it. The possibility of an affiliation switch disappeared in 1995 when New World and NBC signed a 10-year agreement extending the affiliations of KNSD and WVTM-TV in Birmingham, Alabama, in exchange for limits on affiliate compensation and New World developing syndicated programming for the NBC owned-and-operated stations, which developed as the entertainment newsmagazine Access Hollywood.

== NBC ownership ==
=== Sale to NBC and creation of Station Venture Operations ===
On May 22, 1996, New World Communications agreed to sell KNSD and WVTM-TV to NBC for $425 million. Of that total, $250 million was estimated to represent KNSD, setting a record sales price for a San Diego TV station. The deal came amid speculation that New World was trying to sell its 10 Fox affiliates to the Fox network itself. NBC was able to make the purchase, which brought its national coverage to 25.1%, because the Telecommunications Act of 1996 raised the national reach cap for a single station owner from 25 to 35%.

NBC gave LIN Broadcasting a 20-percent ownership stake of KNSD in 1997 in exchange for 80 percent of KXAS-TV, the NBC affiliate in Fort Worth, Texas, as well as cash support for the bid of Hicks, Muse, Tate & Furst for LIN. Kass, who had been KNSD's news director since 1990, departed in 1998, with the station's late newscasts sitting at number-one in the ratings seven nights a week.

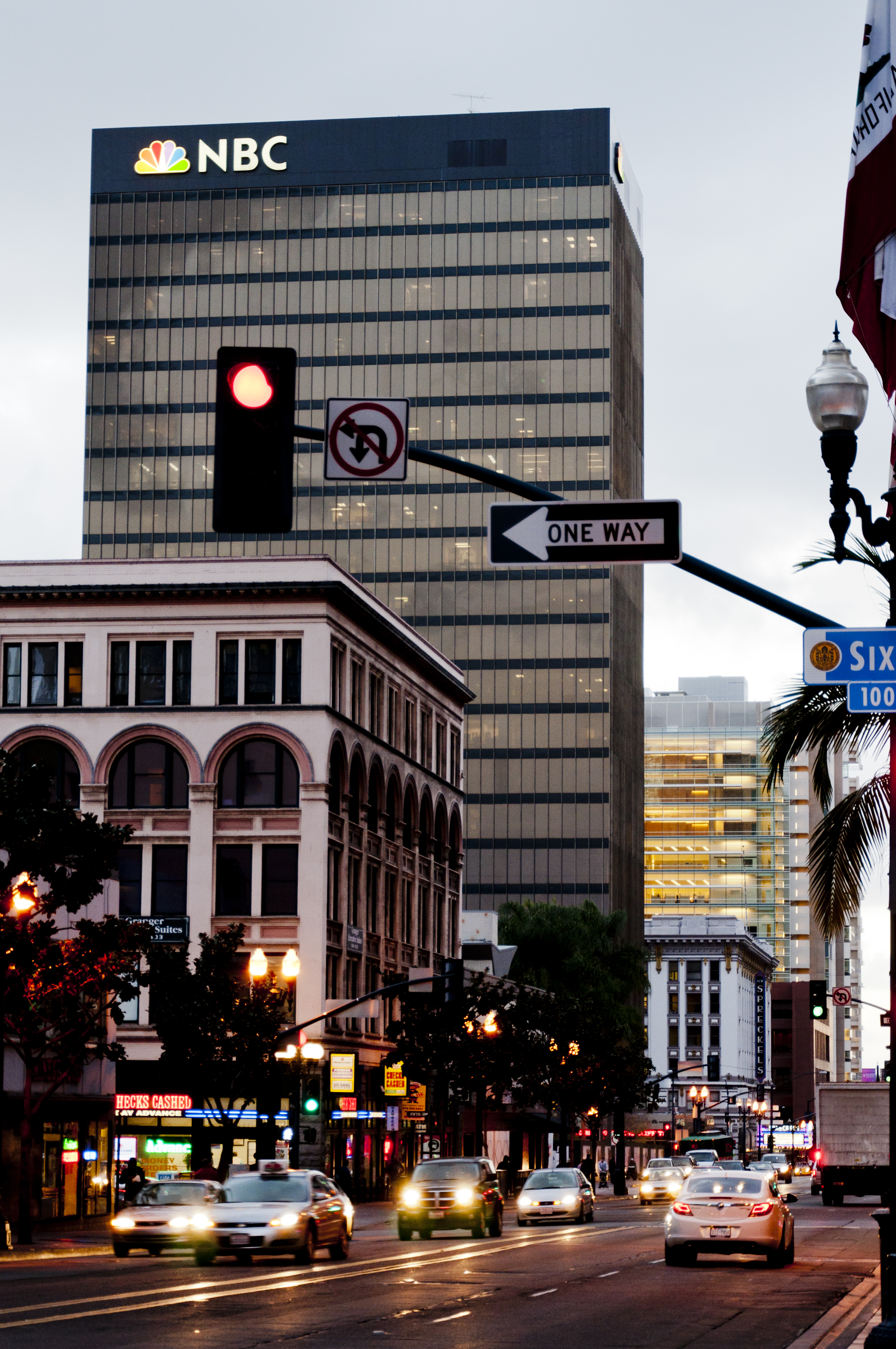
KNSD operated from 225 Broadway from 2001 through 2016.

Phyllis Schwartz succeeded Derrough as KNSD's general manager in 1999 upon his retirement. Schwartz, a San Diego native, had worked for each of the major network affiliates in Chicago, coming from NBC-owned WMAQ-TV. Under her leadership, the station began digital broadcasting on November 1, 1999, and made plans to leave Kearny Mesa after 35 years. In 2000, KNSD announced it would set up studios in 225 Broadway, a downtown office tower. This included street-level studio space as well as the entire third floor. While Kearny Mesa had become a popular spot for TV station siting with KFMB-TV, KNSD, KUSI-TV and KSWB-TV all located there and was closer to northern and eastern San Diego County, the move put KNSD's news operation near the heart of the city. The first broadcast from 225 Broadway took place in December 2001, marking the first time downtown San Diego was home to a TV station since KFMB-TV left in 1977.

Over the course of the 2000s, KNSD continued to lead the 11 p.m. news ratings race with weaker performances in early evening news. For instance, in July 2004, it was third in afternoon news but beat KFMB for the leading late-night newscast. From 2005 to 2008, KNSD provided a 10 p.m. newscast for KSWB-TV (channel 69, cable 5) as part of a deal between NBC and Tribune Broadcasting to outsource newscasts in San Diego and Philadelphia. The newscast was co-anchored by Anne State and Vic Salazar on weeknights. The KSWB arrangement ended after that station obtained Fox affiliation and restarted an in-house local news department.

KNSD experimented with several new programs beginning in 2005, including a weekly lifestyle show, Streetside San Diego, and an entire low-power TV station: KBOP-CA (channel 43) "Mi San Diego", a Spanish-language station featuring San Diego Padres telecasts, a local newscast produced by KNSD, and entertainment programming from KWHY-TV in Los Angeles. During the Great Recession, KNSD scaled back its operation. In December 2008, it canceled weekend morning newscasts, Noticias Mi San Diego (by then airing at 4 a.m. on KNSD itself), and Streetside as part of a layoff of 12 employees. Further cuts saw KNSD outsource weather to KNBC in Los Angeles for several years; Fritz Coleman, KNBC's meteorologist, presented the weeknight weather on KNSD. This ended in 2011 when the station hired two meteorologists, including Dagmar Midcap, whose last on-air role had been at WGCL-TV in Atlanta. During this period, Marty Levin retired in 2010 and was succeeded on the weeknight anchor desk by Mark Mullen, who had previously been a correspondent for ABC News and NBC News. The weekend morning news was restored in 2013.

Though KNSD was operated as part of the NBC-owned station group, LIN continued to participate in the Station Venture Operations joint venture that owned it and KXAS until 2013, when the venture was dissolved as part of a corporate restructuring at LIN. On January 9, 2014, KNSD announced that it would not renew its lease for the 225 Broadway studios and relocate by 2016, ending a 20-year lease five years early. For $9.6 million, NBC purchased a 52,000-square-foot (4,800 m^{2}) building in Kearny Mesa—selected for its access to major roads and free parking—which was gutted and rebuilt to provide newsroom, studio, and office space for the station and opened in 2016.

=== Telemundo integration ===
NBCUniversal posted a job listing in January 2017 seeking a vice president of sales for "a new Telemundo-owned station in San Diego", the first signal that the network was seeking to bring the Telemundo affiliation in-house after more than 26 years of broadcasting on XHAS-TDT, a Tijuana station programmed by Entravision Communications Corporation, when its affiliation agreement expired later that year. Telemundo 20—a subchannel of KNSD, branded as its cable channel—was formally unveiled that April and began in July, expanding the existing KNSD news operation by more than 30 employees to provide Spanish-language evening newscasts. That September, NBC agreed to purchase KUAN-LD of Poway, California, from NRJ TV. By December 18, 2018, Telemundo 20 San Diego was being carried on KUAN. As a result of the 2016 United States wireless spectrum auction, KNSD was repacked to channel 17 on March 14, 2019, with KUAN sharing KNSD's channel.

By 2022, KNSD was in general second place in San Diego–market news ratings and particularly competitive with KFMB-TV in the demographic of viewers 25–54. While KFMB-TV led in total viewers at 6 a.m. and 5, 6, and 11 p.m., KNSD beat or tied KFMB in the 25–54 demo in each of those time periods.

== Notable former on-air staff ==
- Emily Chang – reporter, mid–2000s
- Laurence Gross – entertainment critic, 1983–1990s
- Joe Lizura – meteorologist, 1990–2006
- Jim Stone – sports director, 1990–2009
- Bree Walker – anchor, 1997–2000

== Subchannels ==
KNSD and KUAN-LD transmit from San Miguel Mountain.

Subchannels of KNSD and KUAN-LD
License	Subchannel	Res.	Short name	Programming
KNSD	39.1	1080i	KNSD-DT	NBC
KNSD	39.2	480i	COZI-TV	Cozi TV
KNSD	39.3	480i	CRIMES	NBC True CRMZ
KNSD	39.4	480i	OXYGEN	Oxygen
KUAN-LD	48.1	1080i	KUAN-LD	Telemundo
KUAN-LD	48.2	480i	TELX-LD	TeleXitos
