= Joe Calhoun =

American weather meteorologist

- Born: Philadelphia, Pennsylvania
- Education: Penn State University
- Occupation: Television meteorologist
- Years active: 1982–2024
- Employer(s): WGAL (Lancaster, PA)
- Spouse: Denise Calhoun
- Children: 4
- Awards: Seal of Approval from NWS (1984), Induction at Mid-Silver Circle Emmy Awards (2024), WGAL Hall of Fame (2025)

Joe Calhoun is a retired American television meteorologist and weather journalist. He had a 40-year career as a meteorologist forecasting the weather, working for Hearst Television's KETV in Omaha, Nebraska, from 1983 to 1987, and at its sister station WGAL in Lancaster, Pennsylvania, as chief meteorologist from 1987 to 2024. He was a member of the American Meteorological Society. He was also involved in fundraising for the Salvation Army and WGAL's Coats for Kids Telethon and was a spokesperson for the Salvation Army's public service announcements for the telethon, until he retired from broadcast meteorology. He remains with WGAL, focusing on special projects and other stories, such as WGAL's weather outlook specials for each season every year.

== Early life and education ==
Calhoun graduated from Frankford High School in 1976 and Penn State University in 1981. His interest in meteorology began when he went fishing with his father on the Jersey Shore. When Calhoun was a high school student, he took lessons at the Franklin Institute about weather. He examined satellite imagery and maps during his study, which further increased his interest in meteorology. He was an adjunct professor at Millersville University since 1990, where he taught broadcast meteorology in the Department of Earth and Sciences.

== Career ==
A Philadelphia native, Calhoun began his career at Freese-Notis Weather company in Des Moines, Iowa after graduating from his alma mater Penn State University, before moving to Hearst Television's KETV in Omaha, Nebraska, in 1983, where he was an on-air meteorologist for the morning and weekend newscasts.

In 1987, he then moved to join sister station WGAL in Lancaster, Pennsylvania, as a weather anchor, reporter, and meteorologist replacing WGAL weatherman Tony Cavalier. In 1989, following the departure of WGAL chief meteorologist Rob Dixon, Calhoun was promoted to chief meteorologist. He provided the weather forecasts for the Susquehanna Valley, which aired on News 8 Today in the mornings and News 8 at Noon. He even got a chance to interview Willard Scott who was visiting the Susquehanna Valley in 1989.

In 2013, following the retirement of WGAL meteorologist Doug Allen, Calhoun was assigned to cover the weather forecasts for News 8 at 4:30, 5, 5:30, 6, 10, and 11 in the evenings while meteorologist Christine Ferriera took Calhoun's spot in the mornings.

In 2020, Calhoun, with the help of WGAL, set up a studio in a room of his house where he remotely presented the weather due to the COVID-19 pandemic.

On January 4, 2024, Calhoun announced his retirement from WGAL after 40 years with the station's parent company, Hearst TV, and 36 years spent at WGAL, but also said he would still be around News 8 to do special projects and other stories, and contribute to WGAL's Weather Outlook specials. His last day was set for January 19, 2024.

On January 11, 2024, he announced on that day's News 8 Today edition that his friend and colleague Christine Ferriera would be taking his place as chief meteorologist after he retires. Calhoun retired on January 19, 2024.

He returned to WGAL to help celebrate the station's 75th anniversary. He returned to help cover the 2024 U.S. Women's Open.

He returned on News 8 to report on the fall foliage outlook.

== Personal life ==
Calhoun is married to his wife, Denise, and the married couple has four children and seven grandchildren. Calhoun and his son cook as a hobby.

== Awards and recognition ==
In 2024, on the day he retired, Calhoun's daughter presented to her father that the Lancaster mayor will proclamate January 20th as "Joe Calhoun Day", and he was honored by state lawmakers for his 36 years at WGAL. He was inducted into the Silver Circle Society at the Mid-Atlantic Emmy Awards for his 41-year career in broadcast meteorology.
