= Bill Saylor =

American TV personality

William A. "Bill" Saylor was an American television broadcaster who worked for 34 years at WGAL in Lancaster, Pennsylvania. He covered major stories in the Susquehanna Valley, including President John F. Kennedy’s arrival in 1962, Hurricane Agnes in 1972, and the Three Mile Island accident in 1979.

== Early life ==
Saylor was born to Samuel and Miriam Saylor in Reading, Pennsylvania, during the Great Depression.

When the US entered WWII, Bill and his best friend from Reading High School joined the Navy. Following Saylor's time in the Navy, he held a variety of odd jobs.

He moved to New York City to be a camera technician and attended the Cambridge School of Broadcasting simultaneously.

== Career ==
Saylor started his career joining WGAL in 1961. He was on a variety of programs and held many positions as a reporter, weather presenter (for which he was known as "The Atlantic Weather Man"), and anchor. He covered several stories during his tenure, including President John F. Kennedy's arrival at the airport when he visited Lancaster in 1962, Hurricane Agnes in 1972, and the Three Mile Island accident in 1979. Saylor retired from WGAL in 1995 after 34 years.

He then moved on to become a candidate for County Commissioner in 1995. A year later, in 1996, he ran for State Senate in the 13th District, and again ran for County Commissioner in 1999 and 2003. In 2000, Saylor served as a campaign chair for a state representative candidate and for many years served as the Democratic Committee Person in his precinct at Millersville Borough. Saylor was later the Personnel Committee Chair of Lancaster County's Executive Board.

== Awards ==
In 2005, Saylor received the Lifetime Achievement Award for his years of commitment to the Democratic Party as well as the community, by Lancaster County Democratic Committee.

== Death ==
Saylor died on Saturday, March 21, 2020, from an aneurysm at age 90.
