= Jim Sinkovitz =

American TV broadcaster

- Born: Harrisburg, Pennsylvania, U.S.
- Education: Wesley College
- Occupations: Television journalist, news anchor (formerly)
- Years active: 1971–2016
- Employer(s): WGAL (Lancaster, PA)
- Children: 1
- Awards: Purple Heart, WGAL Hall of Fame (2021)

Jim Sinkovitz is a retired American television journalist. He was known for his extensive experience in radio, television news, reporting, and anchoring, spanning nearly 45 years, and covered major stories that shaped local history until his retirement in 2016. Around WGAL in his 2 stints, he was nicknamed "Sink" by his colleagues.

== Career ==
Sinkovitz joined WGAL in 1987 as its Bureau Chief in its Harrisburg newsroom, weekend anchor, and reporter. While there, he covered the 1989 riot at State Correctional Institution - Camp Hill. He also covered the Democratic National Convention and the Republican Convention in Houston as a reporter in 1992.

In 1995, Sinkovitz left WGAL after eight years and moved to Philadelphia to join WPHL as an anchor and reporter for 10 years and then joined WCAU in 2006 as a writer and producer.

On May 16, 2008, Sinkovitz returned to the team at WGAL and was based in Dauphin County as a reporter and weekend anchor in the evenings.

On November 13, 2015, it was announced that Sinkovitz would retire from WGAL at the end of the year after nearly 45 years in the news and radio business. Sinkovitz later finalized his retirement date for January 9. He retired on January 9, 2016, and received well-wishes from his colleagues, friends, and the community at the end of his final weekend newscast.

While he retired from full-time work at WGAL, Sinkovitz (who is a Marine Corps Vietnam War veteran himself) came out of retirement to produce and report special war stories on News 8, focusing on Vietnam War veterans and the impact the war has had on them, as well as the honors they receive for their service.

== Awards and recognition ==
In 2021, Sinkovitz was inducted into the WGAL Hall of Fame for his two stints at the station.
