= Ed Wickenheiser =

American broadcaster

Edmund "Ed" Wickenheiser Jr. (1938–May 6, 2019) was an American radio and television broadcaster. He worked as news director for 21 years at WGAL in Lancaster, Pennsylvania, and was the first reporter on the scene of the partial meltdown at Three Mile Island.

== Early life ==
Wickenheiser graduated from Lancaster Catholic High School and attended Franklin and Marshall College, taking courses in business and management. He enlisted in the United States Marine Corps in 1956, and served three tours of active duty during the Cold War, Vietnam War, and the Gulf War.

== Career ==
In the mid-1950s, Wickenheiser worked at WCOY–AM 1580 in Columbia, followed by WGAL–AM 1490 in the early 1960s and WSBA–AM 910 in the late 1960s through 1979 in York, where he worked as a journalist, news director, and operations manager. In September 1960, he interviewed John F. Kennedy when he traveled with him in a caravan with stops in Lancaster, Columbia, and the York Fair Grounds while being accompanied by Sen. Joseph Clark and Gov. David Lawrence.

In March 1979, Wickenheiser covered the nuclear meltdown of the Three Mile Island accident. He joined WGAL in September 1979 as its news director. Wickenheiser retired from WGAL in 2000 after 21 years to spend more time with his family.

In retirement, he did volunteer work at his church, Holy Trinity Catholic, and with Lancaster Emergency Management, including the Lancaster County Counter-Terrorism Task Force. He returned to WGAL in 2009 to celebrate its 60th Anniversary.

== Death ==
Wickenheiser died of cancer on May 6, 2019 at the age of 80.
