= Jeff Werner (sportscaster) =

American sportscaster

Jeffrey Keith Werner was an American sports broadcaster. He was known for anchoring sports at WGAL for 21 years and at WIOV-FM radio for 24 years, hosting his radio show, Time Machine for 10 years until he retired in 2015.

== Early life ==
Werner was born in and raised in Mohnton, Pennsylvania. He attended Governor Mifflin Junior and Senior High Schools and graduated in 1964. He studied radio and television at Northeast Broadcasting School in Boston. After graduating, he worked at WEEU for one year.

Werner enlisted in the United States Army and was posted to Japan, where he worked at the Armed Forces Radio Network. He returned to the United States in 1969 and began working for WGAL TV.

== Career ==
Werner worked at WGAL-TV from 1969 to 1990. He was a reporter, anchor, and weatherman, but mainly was a sports reporter. Following that, he worked for WIOV. From around 1999, Werner hosted a show on WIOV called The Time Machine with Jeff Werner, which mainly played country music from requests from callers.

== Personal life and death ==
Werner was married to Joyce (née Reifsnyder). They had two children, Janika and Todd. Werner married in 1987 to Lisa (née Wolf).

Werner was a fan of the Philadelphia Eagles.

Werner died at age 69 on September 22, 2016.
