= Dick Hoxworth =

American TV personality

- Born: Richard "Dick" Hoxworth; Lancaster, Pennsylvania, United States
- Occupations: Television journalist, news anchor (formerly)
- Years active: 1968–2008
- Employer(s): WGAL (Lancaster, PA)
- Spouse: Sue Loucks
- Children: Jonathan
- Awards: 3× Regional Emmy Awards; WGAL Hall of Fame (2016)

Richard "Dick" Hoxworth is a retired American TV journalist. He was known for his forty-year career at WGAL in Lancaster, Pennsylvania, anchoring News 8 Today in the morning and News 8 at Noon in the afternoon.

== Early life ==
Hoxworth grew up in a blue-collar neighborhood in southeastern Lancaster, and for a time, worked as a paperboy. He grew up watching WGAL when he was young because it was the only station his family picked up on their TV. In 1965, he was drafted into the US Air Force. For two years, he stayed in Tokyo to take college courses and work as a cryptographer. He keeps a dog tag on his key chain to remember his years in the military.

== Career ==
After discovering an interest in writing in English class, he joined WGAL in 1968. During his tenure, he was known for breaking the news of Hurricane Agnes in 1972, the Three Mile Island accident in 1979, covered the 1988 Democratic National Convention, interviewed Natalie Wood, Gregory Peck and Bob Hope, as well as the return of the first American prisoners of war from Vietnam. He also covered the abandoned town of Centralia, Pennsylvania in 2005, where a fire broke out underground in 1962. He then paid a visit to the abandoned place, speaking to a few citizens still living at their homes, which sat above the smoldering coal fire.

On November 25, 2008, Hoxworth announced he would be retiring from News 8 Today. He retired from WGAL on December 24, 2008. He returned in March 2009 for the station's 60th Anniversary. In January 2011, Hoxworth briefly returned to WGAL to pay tribute to Maj. Richard Winters. In March 2024, he returned to WGAL along with other former anchors to help celebrate its 75th Anniversary.

== Awards ==
Hoxworth won several press awards, including three regional Emmys. In 2016, he was among the first inductees to be honored and inducted into the WGAL Hall of Fame. In 2022, Hoxworth was honored at a Lancaster Barnstormers game and was given a blanket of honor for his military service in the Air Force for four years.

== Personal life ==
Hoxworth married Sue Loucks in 1975. They also have a son named Jonathan (born July 4, 1978).
