= Barbara M. Allen =

American TV personality

- Died: November 26, 2017; West Willow, Lancaster County, Pennsylvania
- Education: Mount Holyoke College (BA); Syracuse University (MA)
- Occupations: Journalist; TV personality; entrepreneur; professor
- Employers: WGAL; WITF-TV; Elizabethtown College; UPMC Central Pa
- Television: WGAL Noonday at 8; The Gathering Place; American Dreamers
- Children: 1

Barbara M. Allen (c. 1939 – 26 November 2017) was an American television interviewer, producer, and public relations executive. She spent eight years at WGAL-TV in Lancaster, Pennsylvania, hosting the daytime talk segment Noonday on 8 (1966–1974), before joining PBS affiliate WITF-TV, where she presented the nationally distributed series The Gathering Place and produced American Dreamers. Beyond broadcasting, Allen co‑founded River Ridge Video Productions, served as the first director of public relations for St Joseph Hospital, and later taught communication arts at Elizabethtown College.

== Early life and education ==
Allen was adopted by parents who reared her in Hackensack, New Jersey. As a child she stuttered so was given elocution lessons which led to an interest in acting. She graduated from Mount Holyoke College with an A.B. degree in Speech and Drama. She earned an M.S. in Television‑Radio from Syracuse University’s S.I. Newhouse School of Public Communications. After graduation, she moved to Denver with her fiance and found a job at a local NBC affiliate. After she married Howard Allen and gave birth to their daughter Kim the family moved to Lancaster, Pennsylvania.

== Career ==
After Allen's daughter enrolled in school, she began her TV career at WGAL in 1966 as a part-time public affairs interviewer for Noonday on 8, where she conducted interviews with many local and national celebrities for eight years. At this time she also wrote and produced television commercials and worked at Elizabethtown College. In 1967, she became the personalities and events hostess for Noonday on 8, replacing Joan Klein.

In 1973, she wrote, hosted, and produced Her Several Worlds, a one‑hour conversation with novelist Pearl S. Buck.

She left WGAL in 1976 to work at WITF-TV as a writer and producer, where she hosted two weekly series that aired nationally on PBS: The Gathering Place and American Dreamers. In 1982, she was an associate director of public information at WITF-TV.

Allen was a co-founder and partner at River Ridge Video Productions, which received an award from the Central Pennsylvania Chapter of Women in Communications for a marketing video for a life care community in Lancaster. She also wrote, co-produced, and acted in an RRVP's children's video, Be Smart About Strangers.

== Post-TV life ==
After leaving television, she became an associate professor of communication arts at Elizabethtown College. At Elizabethtown, she created courses on the history of television and writing for television.

She worked in healthcare as the first director of public relations at St. Joseph Hospital in Lancaster (now UPMC Pinnacle Lancaster). From 2000 to 2012, she maintained allergydoctors.com, the patient‑education website of the Lancaster Allergy & Asthma Center. Allen was also a watercolor artist and received two first-place awards from the Lancaster County Art Association.

In 1995 her daughter nominated her for the Washington Apple Commission contest for a grandmother to be "Granny Smith". Of 3,000 applicants, Allen was chosen as one of nine finalists who were flown out to Wenatchee for the Washington State Apple Blossom Festival where contestants participated in a parade and were interviewed by judges. Allen was selected runner-up.

== Personal life and death ==
Allen volunteered with Domestic Violence Services of Lancaster County, both at one of their shelters and as a member of their speakers' bureau.

She died on November 26, 2017, at Willow Valley Communities.
