= WGAL =

Television station in Lancaster, Pennsylvania

- Lancaster–Harrisburg–York–; Lebanon, Pennsylvania; United States
- City: Lancaster, Pennsylvania
- Channels: Digital: 8 (VHF); Virtual: 8
- Branding: WGAL 8; News 8; MeTV Susquehanna Valley (8.2)

Programming
- Affiliations: 8.1: NBC; for others, see § Technical information and subchannels

Ownership
- Owner: Hearst Television; (Hearst Properties Inc.)

History
- First air date: March 18, 1949
- Former call signs: WGAL-TV (1949–1991)
- Former channel numbers: Analog: 4 (VHF, 1949–1952), 8 (VHF, 1952–2009); Digital: 58 (UHF, 1999–2009)
- Former affiliations: All secondary: CBS and ABC (1949–1963); DuMont (1949–1956)
- Call sign meaning: from WGAL radio (now WRKY)

Technical information
- Licensing authority: FCC
- Facility ID: 53930
- ERP: 59 kW
- HAAT: 419 m (1,375 ft)
- Transmitter coordinates: 40°2′4″N 76°37′7″W
- Translator(s): 35 (UHF) Harrisburg

Links
- Public license information: Public file; LMS
- Website: www.wgal.com

WGAL (channel 8) is a television station licensed to Lancaster, Pennsylvania, United States, serving the Susquehanna Valley region as an affiliate of NBC. Owned by Hearst Television, the station maintains studios on Columbia Avenue (PA 462) in Lancaster Township. Its transmitter is located near US 30 north of Hallam.

Largely due to WGAL's licensing, it has been the market leader for most of the time since records have been kept. During the analog era, it was the only commercial VHF station in eastern Pennsylvania licensed outside of Philadelphia.

== History ==
The station first signed on the air on March 18, 1949, originally broadcasting on VHF channel 4.WGAL signed on the air on March 18, 1949, originally broadcasting on VHF channel 4. It was the fourth television station in Pennsylvania and the first to sign-on outside of Philadelphia, beating WDTV (now KDKA-TV) in Pittsburgh which began operations in November of that year.

It was founded by the Steinman family, owners of WGAL radio (1490 AM, now WRKY, and 101.3 FM, now WROZ) and Lancaster's two major newspapers, the Intelligencer Journal and the Lancaster New Era. At the time, Lancaster was the smallest city in the country with a television station. The station's first formal program was shown on March 22 to a group of RCA executives, television dealers, and radio station personnel at the Stevens House Hotel in downtown Lancaster.

WGAL was a major beneficiary of a quirk in the Federal Communications Commission (FCC)'s plan for allocating stations. In the early days of broadcast television, there were twelve VHF channels available and 69 UHF channels (later reduced to 55 in 1983). The VHF bands were more desirable because they carried longer distances. Since there were only twelve VHF channels available, there were limitations as to how closely the stations could be spaced.

After the FCC's Sixth Report and Order ended the license freeze and opened the UHF band in 1952, it devised a plan for allocating VHF licenses. Under this plan, almost all of the country would be able to receive two commercial VHF channels plus one noncommercial channel. Most of the rest of the country ("1/2") would be able to receive a third VHF channel. Other areas would be designated as "UHF islands" since they were too close to larger cities for VHF service. The "2" networks became CBS and NBC, "+1" represented non-commercial educational stations, and "1/2" became ABC (which was the weakest network usually winding up with the UHF allocation where no VHF was available).

What would become the Harrisburg–Lancaster–Lebanon–York market, however, was sandwiched between Philadelphia (channels 3, 6, 10, and 12) to the east, Johnstown–Altoona–State College (channels 6 and 10) to the west, Scranton–Wilkes-Barre (a UHF island) to the north, and Baltimore (channels 2, 11, and 13) and Washington, D.C. (channels 4, 5, 7, and 9) to the south. This created a large "doughnut" in South Central Pennsylvania where there could be only one VHF license.

In 1952, WGAL increased its power from 1,000 to 7,200 watts. On December 31, 1952, the station moved to channel 8 as a requirement by the FCC to prevent interference with WRC-TV in Washington.

On January 1, 1954, WGAL presented its first color television broadcast of the Tournament of Roses Parade. It has always been an NBC affiliate, but also carried some programs from CBS, DuMont and ABC until 1963 when Nielsen collapsed the Lancaster and Harrisburg–York areas into one large market. The Steinmans also launched WDEL-TV in Wilmington, Delaware, around the same time as WGAL's launch but sold that station in 1955.

Over the years, the family purchased three more television stations (KOAT in Albuquerque, New Mexico, and KVOA in Tucson, Arizona, both of which were sold to Pulitzer Publishing in 1969, and WTEV-TV, now WLNE-TV, in New Bedford, Massachusetts) as well as several radio stations and newspapers. The Steinmans sold off the WGAL radio stations in 1976, but kept WGAL-TV until late 1978, when it sold channel 8 and WTEV to Pulitzer—in the process, earning a handsome return on the original investment they made when they signed on WGAL radio in 1922. The Pulitzer purchase reunited WGAL-TV and WTEV with KOAT (that company spun off KVOA in 1972).

Under Pulitzer's ownership, in 1985, WGAL became the first television station in Pennsylvania to broadcast in stereo, beating much larger stations in Philadelphia and Pittsburgh. Although the radio and television stations had gone their separate ways 15 years earlier, channel 8 dropped the "-TV" suffix from its callsign in 1992. Pulitzer sold its entire television division, including WGAL and KOAT, to what was then Hearst-Argyle Television in 1998.

The station is known for being a community service leader in the market and holds the Salvation Army Coats For Kids drive and telethon, and airs the Children's Miracle Network telethon, and the Jefferson Awards. Anchors and other on-air personalities are active in the community as well.

A typical WGAL highway sign, featuring a classic WGAL logo. This sign is found on PA 462 eastbound entering Lancaster.

WGAL has also been known for installing numerous signs on area highways. Most of these signs consist of the WGAL logo used from 1969 to 1990, the phrase "Drive Carefully" and the borough or township where the sign is located. Although the logo is no longer used, the signs are still commonplace around the market, and are occasionally updated so as to be more visible to motorists.

On February 14, 2014, a portion of the roof at WGAL's Columbia Avenue studio facility collapsed due to heavy accumulations of snow and ice caused by a winter storm that moved through the Eastern United States earlier that week. This caused the newsroom on the second floor of the building to be evacuated, followed by the evacuation of the remainder of the station's 100 employees after Lancaster Township Fire Department officials examined the structural stability of the facility. Fire officials determined that a concrete support beam and slab in an adjacent studio that is no longer used by WGAL had shifted and dropped. As a result, with its master control unstaffed, the station went off the air, scuttling plans to broadcast its 5, 5:30 and 6 p.m. newscasts that evening out of a makeshift studio outside the building (the station was able to produce a live newscast that was streamed on its website). Area Comcast systems soon piped in either WGAL's Baltimore sister station WBAL-TV or NBC's Philadelphia O&O WCAU to restore NBC programming, including the 2014 Winter Olympics. WGAL staff members were allowed to re-enter its studios on the afternoon of February 15 after a steel column was installed in the room to prop up a sagging roof beam in the affected area of the building, following which the station resumed regular programming.

On December 16, 2016, WGAL unveiled its Hall of Fame, honoring the founders and pioneers of WGAL who shaped its strong foundation and legacy that continues to this day forward.

== News operation ==
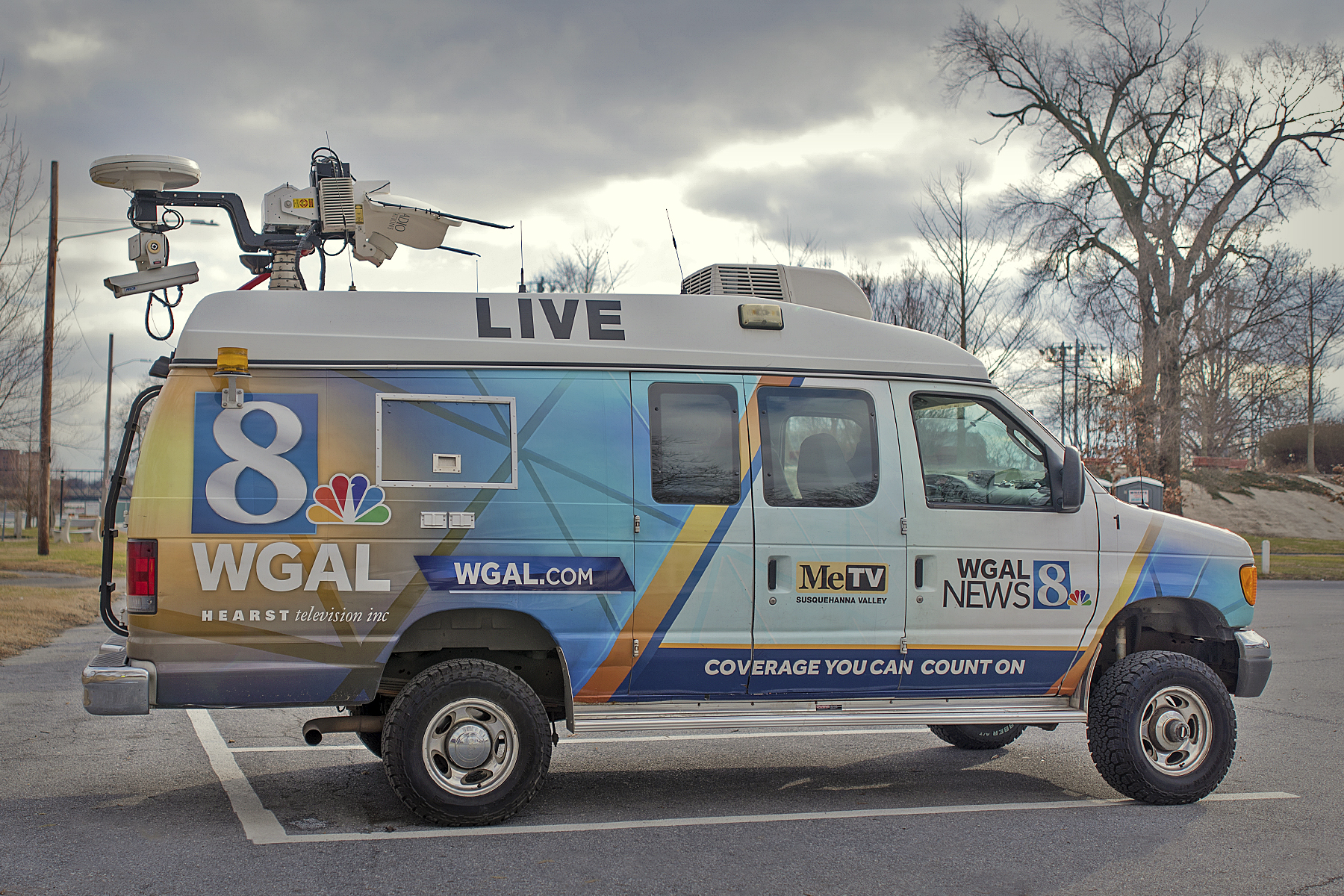
A WGAL 8 News truck on City Island, Harrisburg in January 2020.

In addition to its main studios, WGAL operates bureaus in Harrisburg (on Market Street) and York (on South George Street a.k.a. BL I-83/Susquehanna Trail). The station operates the area's only live weather radar at its transmitter site known as "Super Doppler 8". As the only VHF station in the area, it has been the market leader for many years. This may also have to do with its newspaper roots, as is typical for many long-standing market leaders in the United States.

As of 2013, WGAL's dominance is primarily in Lancaster and York counties, which contain the majority of the market's population. Starting in 2012, WGAL began experiencing declines in news viewership, the largest occurring in May 2013 That July, WHTM-TV beat WGAL for the first time at 5 p.m. among adults 25–54. WGAL lost ground in other time periods, including at 6 p.m., and fell to a virtual tie with WHTM at noon.

On September 30, 1995, weekend morning editions of News 8 Today premiered. In 2010, a 6 a.m. hour of News 8 Today was added. In February 2010, days before the Winter Olympics, WGAL began using updated tickers for weather warnings, school closings and breaking news to fit 16:9 screens, preventing high definition programming from reverting to 4:3 standard definition when the tickers appeared. Around late October or early November 2010, WGAL's news set was modified with two new flat screen monitors to the left and right of the set, and an additional flat screen monitor was added to the front of the new anchor desk.

On December 13, 2010, starting with its 5 p.m. newscast, WGAL became the first television station in the Harrisburg–Lancaster–Lebanon–York market to begin broadcasting its local newscasts in widescreen standard definition, and also introduced updated on-screen graphics. Before WGAL's switch to widescreen newscasts, the market was the largest Nielsen television market in which all of its stations did not broadcast their local newscasts in either high definition or 16:9 widescreen.

On August 29, 2011, WGAL became the second station in South Central Pennsylvania (behind Fox affiliate WPMT) to begin broadcasting its local newscasts in high definition. The news open was modified to include the station's legacy logos, while the set remained unchanged until newscasts returned to Studio B with a new set on February 5, 2012. As of April 14, 2012, with WHP-TV's upgrade to HD newscasts, all four major stations in the Susquehanna Valley (WGAL, WPMT, WHP-TV and WHTM-TV) now air their local newscasts in HD; however, unlike the other three, WGAL airs only in-studio segments in the format (its field video continues to be presented in enhanced definition widescreen).

On February 4, 2013, WGAL debuted a nightly half-hour 10 p.m. newscast on its then This TV (now MeTV) affiliated second digital subchannel. On August 22, 2016, WGAL debuted an hour-long newscast at 4 p.m. This coincided with the cancellation of The Meredith Vieira Show.

On September 26, 2023, WGAL launched a redesigned, state-of-the-art news set in Studio A, which made its debut at the start of that day's News 8 at Noon.

On September 14, 2026, WGAL will launch a 7 p.m. newscast as the replacement for Access Hollywood, rival to lead-in Entertainment Tonight. This is the second 7 p.m. newscast that WGAL has done; the first aired from September 1980 to September 1988.

=== Former on-air staff ===
- Barbara Allen – host, writer, and producer
- Dave Brandt – sports director, anchor, and host
- Joe Calhoun – chief meteorologist and weather anchor
- Anne S. Herr – host, weathercaster and producer
- Mike Hostetler – sports anchor and reporter
- Dick Hoxworth – news anchor and reporter
- Bill Kuster – weather anchor
- Marijane Landis – producer, host and children's show creator
- Kim Lemon – news anchor and host
- John MacAlarney – news anchor
- Keith Martin – news anchor and reporter
- Ron Martin – news anchor and reporter
- Pat Principe – sports director and anchor
- Bill Saylor – reporter, anchor and weathercaster
- Nelson Sears – news anchor, weathercaster, reporter, promotions manager, and program director
- Jim Sinkovitz – news anchor and reporter
- Janelle Stelson – news anchor
- Jim Stone – sports director and anchor
- Joan Klein Weidman – anchor, weathercaster, and host
- Jeff Werner – sports anchor, reporter, and weatherman
- Ed Wickenheiser – host, reporter, and news director
- Wendall Woodbury – anchor, host and reporter

== Technical information and subchannels ==
WGAL's transmitter is located near US 30 north of Hallam. The station's signal is multiplexed:

Subchannels of WGAL
Subchannel	Res.	Short name	Programming
8.1	1080i	WGAL-TV	NBC
8.2	480i	MeTV	MeTV
8.4	480i	STORY	Story Television
8.5	480i	ION+	Ion Plus
8.6	480i	QVC	QVC
8.7	480i	HSN	HSN

Subchannel broadcast with MPEG-4 video

On January 1, 2009, WGAL began carrying This TV on digital subchannel 8.2. On December 29, 2014, it switched to MeTV, which was previously a subchannel of WGCB-TV.

=== Analog-to-digital conversion ===
WGAL ended regular programming on its analog signal, over VHF channel 8, on June 12, 2009, as part of the federally mandated transition from analog to digital television. The station's digital signal relocated from its pre-transition UHF channel 58, which was among the high band UHF channels (52–69) that were removed from broadcasting use as a result of the transition, to its analog-era VHF channel 8 for its post-transition operations.

=== Translator ===
- WGAL (DRT) 35 Harrisburg
