= KETV =

Television station in Omaha, Nebraska

- Omaha, Nebraska; Council Bluffs, Iowa; United States
- City: Omaha, Nebraska
- Channels: Digital: 20 (UHF); Virtual: 7
- Branding: KETV Channel 7; KETV NewsWatch 7; MeTV Omaha (7.2)

Programming
- Affiliations: 7.1: ABC; for others, see § Subchannels

Ownership
- Owner: Hearst Television; (Hearst Properties Inc.)

History
- First air date: September 17, 1957
- Former channel numbers: Analog: 7 (VHF, 1957–2009)
- Call sign meaning: Omaha's Key TV

Technical information
- Licensing authority: FCC
- Facility ID: 53903
- ERP: 700 kW
- HAAT: 396 m (1,299 ft)
- Transmitter coordinates: 41°18′32″N 96°1′34.2″W

Links
- Public license information: Public file; LMS
- Website: www.ketv.com

KETV (channel 7) is a television station in Omaha, Nebraska, United States, affiliated with ABC. The station is owned by Hearst Television, and has studios on 10th Street in the historic Burlington Station, which carries the nickname of 7 Burlington Station. Its transmitter is located on a "tower farm" near North 72nd Street and Crown Point Avenue in north-central Omaha.

== History ==
KETV first signed on the air on September 17, 1957; it was Omaha's third television station (behind WOW-TV, channel 6, now WOWT, and KMTV, channel 3). The station has been an ABC affiliate from its debut (and the only one in Omaha that has never changed its affiliation); KETV is the second full-time ABC affiliate in the Omaha market; KOLN-TV in Lincoln previously served as Omaha's ABC affiliate for much of 1953 and 1954 until the Federal Communications Commission split off Lincoln into its own separate market from Omaha. Incidentally, until KLKN-TV signed on from Lincoln in 1996 (by then, KOLN had switched to CBS), KETV served as the default ABC affiliate for Nebraska's state capital; to this day, KETV still retains significant viewership in Lincoln, and the station operates a news bureau in the city. Channel 7 was originally owned by the World Publishing Company, publisher of the Omaha World-Herald. It associated itself with the newspaper early on, branding itself as "Omaha World-Herald Television".

Construction magnate Peter Kiewit, Jr. bought World Publishing in 1962. Due to a change in FCC regulations that barred the common ownership of newspapers and television stations in a single market, Kiewit sold the station to Pulitzer Broadcasting Company in 1976. In 1984, KETV introduced its current logo, which is a variation of the widely used Circle 7 logo; the logo received a slight update in 2000. In 1998, Pulitzer sold its entire broadcasting division, including KETV, to Hearst-Argyle Television (the predecessor of the present-day Hearst Television).

On July 4, 2003, KETV's transmitter tower (at the North 72nd Street tower farm) collapsed during the addition of a digital television antenna. Because the collapse occurred late at night, there were no injuries; however, KETV was knocked off the air as a result. The station was forced to broadcast from its shorter auxiliary tower for over a year. A new tower was erected almost 200 feet (61 m) east of where the former tower stood on the tower farm and was completed in late 2004.

On July 9, 2012, a conflict between Hearst Television and Time Warner Cable caused KETV to be taken off the provider's systems in the Lincoln market. This blackout lasted until July 19, 2012, when a carriage deal was reached between Hearst and Time Warner Cable.

On June 5, 2013, Hearst Television announced the purchase of the historic Burlington Station; the former train station was adaptively reused into a broadcasting and web media facility for KETV. On October 28, 2015, KETV's news operation moved into the renovated building in downtown Omaha. The first broadcast aired at 5 p.m. that night.

On June 14, 2018, KETV was dropped from Spectrum's channel lineup in Lincoln.

== Programming ==
=== Preemptions and deferrals ===
From September 2006 until the program was dropped by ABC on August 28, 2010, KETV preempted ABC Kids broadcasts of the Power Rangers series due to lack of E/I content (as was common with Hearst's other ABC stations); the station tape-delayed Kim Possible and Power Rangers SPD for broadcast on early Monday mornings before World News Now during the 2005–06 season for the same reason. All three programs, during their respective periods of time, were cleared by KLKN in Lincoln; as it covers the Omaha area to a decent amount, it served as the city's default home for each program.

KETV was one of many ABC stations that preempted the special showing of Saving Private Ryan in late 2004 due to concerns that the FCC would impose a fine on them if they had aired the World War II-set movie due to the Super Bowl XXXVIII halftime show controversy earlier that year. The station, along with other Hearst-owned ABC affiliated stations, aired the 1992 film Far and Away instead; for the above reason, the program aired on all of the state's other ABC stations, and it was eventually determined that the movie's broadcast did not violate FCC regulations.

KETV currently airs GMA: The Third Hour at 11 a.m. on a one-day behind basis due to a noon newscast.

=== News operation ===
KETV presently broadcasts 32 hours of locally produced newscasts each week (with five hours each weekday, 3 1/2 hours on Saturdays and 4 1/2 hours on Sundays). The station operates a Doppler weather radar called Next Generation Super Doppler 7, which is located near the station's transmitter site near North 72nd Street and Crown Point Avenue. The high resolution weather radar was built in 2007 and updated in 2016. The radar tower at the Crown Point site replaced the original weather radar (later Doppler/Super Doppler 7) that had been based atop the station's original studios on 27th & Douglas Streets in downtown Omaha since the late 1970s. The Douglas Street radar tower and dome would remain standing and unused for several years until the demolition of the original KETV building in May 2016.

For the last three decades, the station's newscasts have been branded as NewsWatch 7. Under its current ownership, the title was revised in 2000 to KETV NewsWatch 7. KETV was the first station in the market to have a full-time meteorologist beginning in the early 1970s, the first station to use live weather radar in the late 1970s, and was the second station to utilize Doppler weather radar in the early 1980s. In November 2006, KETV overtook long-time ratings leader WOWT to become the top-rated news station in the Omaha market. Since then, WOWT and CBS affiliate KMTV have fought for second place with KETV far in front of either station.

Among the many KETV alumni is John Coleman who worked at the station in the 1960s. Coleman later appeared as the meteorologist for Good Morning America before going on to develop and launch The Weather Channel in 1982. That same year, then-KETV chief meteorologist, Charlie Martin took a job at The Weather Channel to become one of the cable channel's first on-camera meteorologists. Martin, who worked at KETV from the late 1970s through the early 1980s, was known on TWC as Charlie Levy.

Since 1982, KETV has been known for its weekly Crimestoppers segments, and has contributed to the arrest and conviction of more than 1,000 wanted felons. KETV has also had a long-running hotline and webpage called 7 Can Help, which has and continues to contribute to helping the greater Omaha community through financial grants, high utility bill relief, and services for area children. 7 Can Help has also been known to intercede on behalf of senior citizens with matters such as getting benefits that have been otherwise denied them.

In October 1996, KETV began televising all of its local newscasts from a "working newsroom" set known as "The Newsplex", a multimillion-dollar broadcast facility (which is very similar in design to the newsroom set that has been used by Fox affiliate KOKH-TV in Oklahoma City since around the same time frame). In the years prior to the "Newsplex", reporters and anchors had to type their news stories in a separate newsroom and deliver them to the NewsWatch 7 set located on the opposite side of the building. In February 2006, KETV reformatted its investigative unit as the NewsWatch 7 "I-Team", in an effort to bring more attention to in depth investigative stories, along with health and consumer reporting. On February 1, 2010, KETV became the third television station in Omaha to begin broadcasting its local newscasts in 16:9 widescreen standard definition, which included the introduction of updated graphics. KETV was the last news operation in Omaha to upgrade to full high definition operations, a purposeful move as the new Burlington Station facilities were HD-ready from day one in late October 2015 and it was deemed cost-effective to remain in SD for the last few years at KETV's original facilities.

KETV debuted an hour-long 4 p.m. newscast on September 5, 2022, which replaced The Ellen DeGeneres Show (which ended its run in May that year) and competes with WOWT's newscast in the same timeslot. It was cut to 30 minutes in September 2025 when the station added Jeopardy! to the lineup.

==== Notable former on-air staff ====
- Joe Calhoun – meteorologist (1983–1987)
- John Coleman – meteorologist (1960s)
- Jill Cordes – morning anchor (1990s)
- Harold Dow – anchor/reporter (late 1960s)

== Technical information ==
=== Subchannels ===
The station's signal is multiplexed:

Subchannels of KETV
Subchannel	Res.	Short name	Programming
7.1	1080i	KETV-HD	ABC
7.2	480i	KETV-ME	MeTV
7.3	480i	Story	Story Television
7.4	480i	IONPLUS	Ion Plus
7.5	480i	getTV	Great
7.6	480i	QVC	QVC
15.3	480i	Charge!	Charge! (KXVO)

Broadcast on behalf of another station

In July 2006, KETV launched digital subchannel 7.2 as a 24-hour local weather channel, "Weather Now", an affiliate of The Local AccuWeather Channel with local weather information supplied by KETV's meteorologists; "Weather Now" was also carried on local cable providers and was streamed on the station's website. On September 1, 2011, KETV replaced "Weather Now" with the classic television network MeTV.

In September 2021, GetTV was added on 7.5.

KETV is one of several Hearst-owned ABC stations, and among a handful of ABC affiliates, that broadcasts high-definition programming in the 1080i resolution format rather than 720p like most ABC stations.

=== Analog-to-digital conversion ===
KETV ended regular programming on its analog signal, over VHF channel 7, on June 12, 2009, as part of the federally mandated transition from analog to digital television. The station's digital signal remained on its pre-transition UHF channel 20, using virtual channel 7.

As part of the SAFER Act, KETV kept its analog signal on the air until July 12 to inform viewers of the digital television transition through a loop of public service announcements from the National Association of Broadcasters.
