= Marijane Landis =

American television personality

Marijane Louise Landis (née Frey; August 3, 1928 – December 22, 2015) was an American television broadcaster, producer, host, television personality, and children's television series creator, known for her work with WGAL-TV in Lancaster, Pennsylvania. Considered a pioneer in Pennsylvania television broadcasting, Landis created and produced two children's series: Percy Platypus and His Friends, which aired from 1955 until 1974, and Sunshine Corners from 1974 to 1979.

== Career ==
Landis, who joined the staff of WGAL in October 1952, was originally hired from her previous job at a small theater to host programming focused on women. She was one of the station's first on-air personalities, as well as one of the first women to work in television in Pennsylvania.

In 1978, Landis transitioned from on-air to behind-the-scenes when she became the community services manager and personnel director at WGAL. Landis retired in 1993 after 41 years with WGAL. Landis and Freed's puppets were donated to the State Museum of Pennsylvania in the 1990s.

The puppets which Landis and puppeteer, Jim Freed, used in Percy Platypus and His Friends were donated to the collection of the State Museum of Pennsylvania during the 1990s.

In 1998, Landis was inducted into the Pennsylvania Association of Broadcasters Hall of Fame. Among the honors she collected during her lifetime were a national U.S. Air Force American Spirit Award in 1984, she received the Women in Communications Outstanding Communicator in Central Pennsylvania Award in 1984, the American Business Women's Association Lancaster Charter Chapter Woman of the Year Award (1974), the Lancaster Personal Achievement Award (1987) from WLPA Radio, and the Muscular Dystrophy Association Award for Sunshine Corners.

In 2009, Landis returned along with other former WGAL personnel to help celebrate the station's 60th anniversary.

A year after Landis died, she was posthumously inducted into the WGAL Hall of Fame.

== Personal info ==
Landis was born Marijane Louise Frey on August 3, 1928, in Lancaster, Pennsylvania.

A resident of Millersville, Pennsylvania, Landis died on December 22, 2015, from undisclosed causes, at the age of 87.
