= Joan Klein Weidman =

American television personality

Joan Haenle Klein Weidman (née Klein; August 8, 1933 – June 25, 2019) was an American television broadcaster, host, weathercaster, and anchor. at WGAL in Lancaster, Pennsylvania.

== Early life and education ==
Klein was born in Lancaster, Pennsylvania. She attended concerts with her mother at age three, and studied piano starting at age seven. She played bass fiddle in the Manheim Township High School jazz band, graduating in 1951. In 1955, she graduated from the Eastman School of Music, where she worked for the university radio station as program director and hosted her own program.

== Career ==
By 1957, she had her own five-day per week "Joan Klein Show". Her half hour show included news, weather, cooking tips, interviews, and farm reports. She interviewed well-known entertainers and guests of the time including Wendy Barrie, who was in town for summer stock theater, Eddie Bracken, Cliff Arquette, and Ann B. Davis. She worked at WGAL for 13 years and on Noonday on 8 from its inception in 1961, retiring from the show before the birth of her first child.

She performed as a pianist in the Lancaster Symphony Orchestra. In 1965, she appeared as the character Mae in a local theater production of the musical The Pajama Game. She contrasted the theater experience where one needed to project their voice and keep moving on stage with working in a television studio, where one needed to speak more quickly, sit still, and stay in frame.

== Personal life ==
She married Richard K. Weidman (who was WGAL's graphic artist and art director for 41 years) in September 1958 and had two children. She is related to the Shriver family through her father Frederic Shriver Klein, who was a professor at Franklin & Marshall College.

Klein died on June 25, 2019, at the Mennonite Home in Lancaster after an illness at the age of 85.
