= Dave Brandt (sportscaster) =

American sportscaster

Dave Brandt

David Leroy "Dave" Brandt Jr. (February 8, 1919 – June 10, 2007) was an American sportscaster in Lancaster, Pennsylvania. He worked for WGAL radio and later WGAL-TV, where he presented sports segments including the 15-minute Brandt on Baseball. According to WGAL, he delivered the station’s first televised sports broadcast in 1949 and had an on-air career of 45 years.

== Early life ==
Brandt was born in Marietta, Pennsylvania. He attended Elizabethtown College and began working at WGAL radio in 1937 while a sophomore, according to the Lancaster County Sports Hall of Fame. He served in the United States Army during World War II and returned to broadcasting after his discharge in 1945.

== Career ==
WGAL credits Brandt as one of the first at the station to take sports coverage from radio to television and says he gave the station’s first televised sports segment, Brandt on Baseball, in 1949. After his Army service, he rejoined WGAL radio as a staff announcer and sports director and later moved to WGAL-TV in 1949. He hosted Brandt on Baseball and the game show Stump Your Neighbor, and he interviewed sports figures including Barney Ewell, Nellie Fox, Yogi Berra, Althea Gibson, Arnold Palmer, Jack Nicklaus and Julius Erving; his last interview was with Moses Malone.

Archival WGAL footage shows Brandt reporting from the York Fair in 1953.

Brandt retired from WGAL in 1982 after 45 years in sports broadcasting and 33 years spent at WGAL.

== Awards ==
In 1975, Brandt was inducted into the Susquehanna Chapter of the Pennsylvania Sports Hall of Fame. In 1976, he received the George W. Kirchner Memorial Award from the Lancaster County Sports Hall of Fame; in 1997, he received the J. Freeland Chryst Award. In December 2016, WGAL posthumously inducted him into its Hall of Fame.

== Personal life ==
Brandt married Phyllis Yeagley in 1951, and they settled in Lancaster. The couple had two daughters, Sally Marie and Ann E.; Sally died in 1972. They also had a grandson named Kerry and a great-grandson named Skyler.

== Death ==
Brandt died of natural causes on June 10, 2007, at the age of 88.
