= Denver Broncos Radio Network =

This article is a list of the current Denver Broncos broadcasters. As of the start of the 2015 NFL season, the Broncos' flagship radio station is KOA 850 AM, a 50,000-watt station in Denver, Colorado owned by iHeartMedia. Dave Logan is the play-by-play announcer; he starred for the Colorado Buffaloes before beginning his NFL career, spent mostly with the Cleveland Browns. Rick Lewis is the color commentator. Preseason games not selected for airing on national television were briefly on KCNC, channel 4, which is a CBS owned-and-operated station, as well as other CBS affiliates around the Rocky Mountain region, from 2004 through 2010. The games had for years previously been on KUSA, channel 9, an NBC affiliate, and in 2011, the team returned to KUSA, which has higher news ratings.

The first Broncos network was headed by KBTR; in the team's final season with that station, 1963, there were 15 affiliates. KTLN (known as KTLK beginning in 1969) took over for the rest of the decade; 53 stations were on the network in KTLK's final season of 1969. KOA's first season as network flagship was 1970.

== Radio affiliates ==
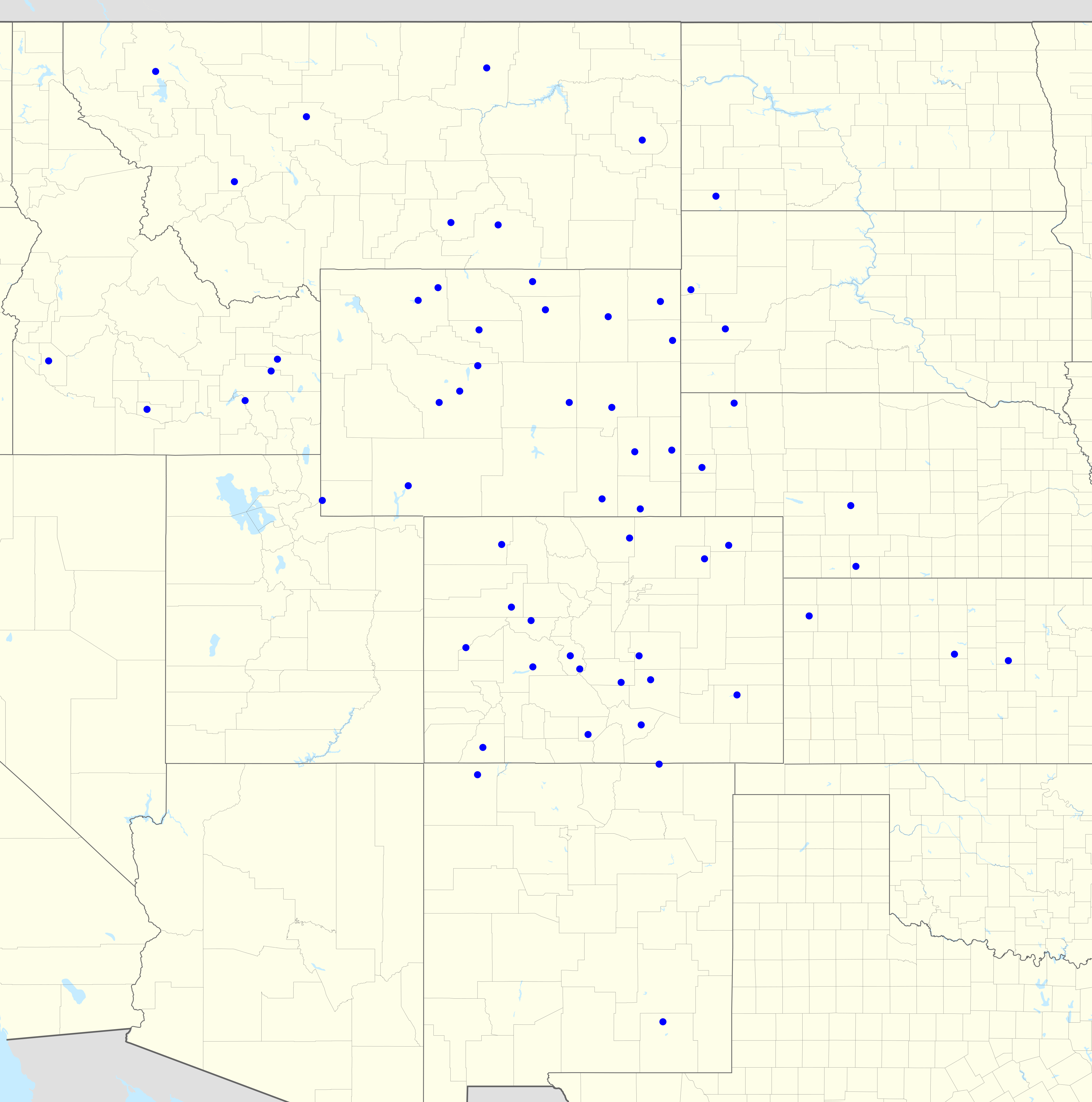
Map of radio affiliates.

Broncos Radio Network

=== Colorado ===
City	Call Sign	Frequency
Alamosa	KALQ-FM	93.5 FM
Aspen	KNFO-FM	106.1 FM
Breckenridge	KSMT-FM	102.1 FM
Buena Vista	KBVC-FM	104.1 FM
Burlington	KNAB-AM	1140 AM
Burlington	KNAB-FM	104.1 FM
Cañon City	KSTY-FM	104.5 FM
Colorado Springs	KBPL-FM	107.9 FM
Craig	KRAI-AM	550 AM
Denver (Flagship station)	KOA-AM	850 AM
Denver (Flagship station)	KRFX-FM	103.5 FM
Durango	KRSJ-FM	100.5 FM
Fort Collins	KCOL-AM	600 AM
Fort Morgan	KSIR-AM	1010 AM
Glenwood Springs	KMTS-FM	99.1 FM
Grand Junction	KSTR-FM	96.1 FM
Gunnison	KPKE-AM	1490 AM
Lamar	KVAY-FM	105.7 FM
Pagosa Springs	KWUF-AM	1400 AM
Pueblo	KUBE AM	1350 AM
Rifle	KNAM-AM	1490 AM
Salida	KGKG-AM	1340 AM
Steamboat Springs	KTWY-FM	98.9 FM
Sterling	KPMX-FM	105.7 FM
Trinidad	KCRT-FM	92.5 FM
Trinidad	KCRT-AM	1240 AM
Vail	KSKE-FM	101.7 FM
Walsenburg	KSPK-FM	102.3 FM
Winter Park/Granby	KRKY-AM	930 AM
Wray	KRDZ-AM	1440 AM

=== Kansas ===
City	Call Sign	Frequency
Colby	KLOE-AM	730 AM
Goodland	KLOE-FM	102.5 FM
Great Bend	KZRS-FM	107.9 FM
Wichita	KGSO	1410 AM/93.9 FM

=== Nebraska ===
City	Call Sign	Frequency
Chadron	KCSR-AM	610 AM
Lincoln	KLIN-AM	1400 AM
Lincoln	KLIN-FM	95.9 FM
McCook	KBRL-AM	1300 AM
North Platte	KOOQ-AM	1410 AM
Ogallala	KOGA-AM	930 AM
Scottsbluff	KNEB-AM	960 AM

=== New Mexico ===
City	Call Sign	Frequency
Albuquerque	KIVA-AM	600 AM
Albuquerque	KABQ-FM	93.7 FM
Farmington	KCQL-AM	1340 AM
Ruidoso	KEDU-FM	102.3 FM

=== Nevada ===
City	Call Sign	Frequency
Las Vegas	KMZQ-AM	670 AM

=== Oklahoma ===
City	Call Sign	Frequency
Alva	KRDR-FM	105.7 FM

=== South Dakota ===
City	Call Sign	Frequency
Belle Fourche	KBFS-AM	1450 AM
Rapid City	KOTA-AM	1380 AM

=== Texas ===
City	Call Sign	Frequency
Abilene	KYYW-AM	1470 AM
Dimmitt	KDHN-AM	1470 AM
Lubbock	KKAM-AM	1340 AM

=== Wyoming ===
City	Call Sign	Frequency
Buffalo	KBBS-AM	1450 AM
Casper	KTWO-AM	1030 AM
Cheyenne	KFBC-AM	1240 AM
Cody	KTAG-FM	97.9 FM
Douglas	KKTY-AM	1470 AM
Gillette	KXXL-FM	106.1 FM
Green River	KFRZ-FM	92.1 FM
Lander	KOVE-AM	1330 AM
Laramie	KOWB-AM	1290 AM
Pine Bluffs	KYWY	95.5 FM
Pinedale	KFZE-FM	104.3 FM
Powell	KPOW-AM	1260 AM
Riverton	KVOW-AM	1450 AM
Saratoga	KTGA-FM	99.3 FM
Sheridan	KWYO-AM	1410 AM
Sundance	KYDT-FM	103.1 FM
Torrington	KGOS-AM	1490 AM
Wheatland	KYCN-AM	1340 AM
Worland	KWOR-AM	1340 AM
