= Colorado Rockies Radio Network =

Professional baseball radio network

- Type: Radio network
- Country: United States

Ownership
- Owner: iHeartMedia

History
- Launch date: 1993

Coverage
- Availability: Regional through 34 affiliates

The Colorado Rockies Radio Network consists of 34 stations (24 A.M., 10 F.M.) plus two F.M. boosters and 10 F.M. translators in six western states of the US. The English language announcers are Jack Corrigan, Jerry Schemmel and Mike Rice. In addition to in-game duties, Corrigan hosts Rockies Q&A and Rice hosts The Rockies Dugout Show.

== Network stations (26 stations) ==
=== Flagship ===
Callsign	Frequency	Location
KOA	850 AM	Denver (English language flagship)
KNRV	1150 AM	Denver (Spanish language flagship)

=== Affiliates ===
==== Colorado ====
Callsign	Frequency	Location
KSBK	100.3 FM	Alamosa/Blanca
KNFO	106.1 FM	Aspen/Glenwood Springs
KNAB	1140 AM	Burlington
KIUP	930 AM	Durango
KFKA	1310 AM	Fort Collins/Greeley
KSIR	1010 AM	Fort Morgan
KTMM	1340 AM	Grand Junction
KLMR	920 AM	Lamar/La Junta
KBGV	1240 AM	Monte Vista
KUBE	1350 AM	Pueblo
KNAM	1490 AM	Rifle
KCGC	94.5 FM	Sterling
KRFD	100.1 FM	Sterling
KNFO	105.5 FM	Vail
KRDZ	1440 AM	Wray/Yuma

==== Kansas ====
Callsign	Frequency	Location
KLOE	730 AM	Colby/Goodland

==== Nebraska ====
Callsign	Frequency	Location
KCSR	610 AM	Chadron
KOGA	930 AM	Ogallala
KOLT	690 AM	Scottsbluff

==== South Dakota ====
Callsign	Frequency	Location
KBFS	1450 AM	Belle Fourche

==== Wyoming ====
Callsign	Frequency	Location
KFBC	1240 AM	Cheyenne
KKTY	1470 AM	Douglas
KOWB	1290 AM	Laramie
KPOW	1260 AM	Powell
KVOW	1450 AM	Riverton
KZWY	106.3 FM	Sheridan
KYDT	103.1 FM	Sundance

== See also ==
- List of XM Satellite Radio channels
- List of Sirius Satellite Radio stations
- List of Colorado Rockies broadcasters
