= Mass media in Colby, Kansas =

Colby, Kansas is a center of media in northwestern Kansas. The following is a list of media outlets based in the city.

== Print ==
=== Newspapers ===
- Colby Free Press, four days a week
- Trojan Express, Colby Community College student newspaper, bi-weekly

== Radio ==
The following radio stations are licensed to and/or broadcast from Colby:

=== AM ===
One AM radio station broadcasts from Colby: KXXX, which broadcasts on 790 AM, playing a Classic Country format.

=== FM ===
Frequency	Callsign	Format	City of License	Notes
88.1	KZCK	Public	Colby, Kansas	NPR; Translator of KANZ, Garden City, Kansas
91.9	KTCC	Modern Rock	Colby, Kansas	CCC college radio
97.9	KWGB	Country	Colby, Kansas	Broadcasts from Goodland, Kansas
100.3	KRDQ	Hot Adult Contemporary	Colby, Kansas	-

== Television ==
Colby is in the Wichita-Hutchinson, Kansas television market. The following television stations are licensed to and/or broadcast from Colby:

Display Channel	Network	Callsign	City of License	Notes
4.1	ABC	KLBY	Colby, Kansas	Satellite of KAKE, Wichita, Kansas
4.2	Me-TV	KLBY	Colby, Kansas	Satellite of KAKE, Wichita, Kansas
19.1	PBS (SD)	KWKS	Colby, Kansas	Satellite of KOOD, Bunker Hill, Kansas
19.2	PBS (HD)	KWKS	Colby, Kansas	Satellite of KOOD, Bunker Hill, Kansas
19.3	Create	KWKS	Colby, Kansas	Satellite of KOOD, Bunker Hill, Kansas
19.4	World	KWKS	Colby, Kansas	Satellite of KOOD, Bunker Hill, Kansas
