= KNEC =

- Yuma, Colorado; United States
- Broadcast area: Western Yuma County, Colorado; Eastern Washington County, Colorado
- Frequency: 100.9 MHz
- Branding: Yuma's 100.9

Programming
- Format: Adult contemporary
- Affiliations: ABC News Radio

Ownership
- Owner: Media Logic, LLC
- Sister stations: KATR-FM, KFTM, KNNG, KRDZ, KSRX, KSTC

History
- First air date: 1999
- Former call signs: KBJI (1998, CP)
- Call sign meaning: Station is located in northeastern Colorado

Technical information
- Licensing authority: FCC
- Facility ID: 84353
- Class: C3
- ERP: 23,000 watts
- HAAT: 106 meters (348 ft)
- Transmitter coordinates: 40°0′33″N 102°45′35″W

Links
- Public license information: Public file; LMS
- Webcast: Listen live
- Website: knecradio.com

KNEC is an adult contemporary formatted broadcast radio station licensed to Yuma, Colorado, serving Western Yuma County and Eastern Washington County in Colorado. KNEC is owned and operated by Media Logic, LLC.
