= KLOE (AM) =

Radio station in Goodland, Kansas

- Goodland, Kansas; United States
- Broadcast area: Western Kansas
- Frequency: 730 kHz
- Branding: 730 Gold

Programming
- Format: Oldies
- Affiliations: SRN News; Colorado Rockies Radio Network; Denver Broncos Radio Network

Ownership
- Owner: Kansas Broadcast Company, LLC
- Sister stations: KKCI; KRDQ; KWGB; KXXX

History
- First air date: 1948 (as KWGB)
- Last air date: December 2025
- Former call signs: KWGB (1948–1958); KBLR (1958–1960)

Technical information
- Licensing authority: FCC
- Facility ID: 18077
- Class: D
- Power: 1,000 watts day; 20 watts night
- Transmitter coordinates: 39°20′4″N 101°45′29.6″W

Links
- Public license information: Public file; LMS
- Website: www.nwksradio.net/kloe

KLOE (730 AM) was a radio station in Goodland, Kansas, owned by Kansas Broadcast Company, LLC, and serving western Kansas from the town of Goodland, Kansas. The station broadcast an oldies format. Severe weather was also covered.

The station carried an extensive schedule of high school football and basketball games as well as University of Kansas football, and basketball. Colorado Rockies baseball and Denver Broncos football were also aired.

== History ==
The station first signed on the air in 1948 as KWGB (King Western Goodland), operating at 730 kHz with 1,000 watts during the day and 20 watts at night, a power specification it maintains to this day. The station was originally licensed to the Goodland Broadcasting Company, owned by James E. Blair. In 1958, as the company launched a new television station, KWGB-TV (channel 10), the radio call sign was briefly changed to KBLR (Kansas Blair Radio) for a period of two years. Both the radio and television stations experienced significant financial difficulties, and by 1960, they were put into bankruptcy.

=== The Kansas Broadcasting System ===
In 1962 the radio station was acquired by Bob Schmidt of Hays, Kansas, who also owned that city's KAYS and KAYS-TV. The acquisition reunited the radio station with its television counterpart, which was simultaneously acquired by Schmidt after having briefly operated as KWHT-TV. Following the reunion, the radio station's call sign was changed to KLOE, and the television station became KLOE-TV.

KLOE and KLOE-TV immediately became part of the newly formed Kansas Broadcasting System (KBS), a network of stations across western and central Kansas anchored by KTVH in Hutchinson. KLOE and its sister stations provided local news and programming to the extreme western portion of the state. KLOE-TV and KLOE radio shared facilities in Goodland, a setup that continued even after the stations were separated. In 1989, a new corporation purchased KLOE-TV and the other KBS satellites, separating the radio and television licenses. The television station call sign was changed to KBSL-TV, while KLOE radio retained its call sign and continued to operate from the facility on West 31st Street in Goodland.

Previous logo

In the 2000s, KLOE operated under the ownership of Rocking M Media. In November 2014, KLOE dropped its mix of farm news, talk, and classic hits and began stunting with Christmas music; after Christmas, the station launched a full-time talk format, which carried over Curtis Duncan's local morning show, The Rush Limbaugh Show, and The Dave Ramsey Show from the previous format. In January 2023, KLOE's conservative talk programming was replaced with a sports radio format branded as "Fox Sports 730" in reflection of its Fox Sports Radio affiliation; Duncan's "Good Neighbor Hour" morning show was retained.

In 2024, the station, along with several other Rocking M Media properties, was acquired by the Kansas Broadcast Company (led by Kyle Bauer) through a bankruptcy auction. On August 5, 2024, KLOE dropped its sports format and flipped to an oldies format, branded as "730 Gold"; a shortened "Good Neighbor Hour" remained on the lineup, followed by a simulcast of a local sports talk show on classic rock sister station KKCI.

KLOE was forced to close after high wind gusts on December 17 and 18, 2025, caused the tower to lean, which resulted in the failure of the porcelain insulators at the base of the tower. More gusty conditions on December 27 and 28 caused the tower to collapse. The costs associated with reconstructing the tower and the "realities facing AM broadcasting" led Kansas Broadcast Company to not rebuild the station and keep it silent. The "Good Neighbor Hour" morning show was moved to KKCI, which would be renamed KLOE-FM on January 26, 2026. The Federal Communications Commission cancelled the KLOE AM license on July 29, 2026.
