= KVRH =

KVRH may refer to:

- KVRH-FM, a radio station (92.3 FM) licensed to serve Salida, Colorado, United States
- KGKG, a radio station (1340 AM) licensed to serve Salida, Colorado, which held the call sign KVRH from 1962 to 2017
