= KLOE =

KLOE may refer to:

- KLOE-FM, a radio station (102.5 FM) licensed to Goodland, Kansas, United States
- KLOE (AM), a radio station (730 AM) formerly licensed to Goodland, Kansas
- KLOE (experiment), a particle detector and experiment in Frascati, Italy
- KBSL-DT, a television station (channel 10) licensed to Goodland, Kansas, which used the call sign KLOE-TV from 1962 to 1989
