= KSRX =

- Sterling, Colorado; United States
- Frequency: 97.5 MHz
- Branding: Bob FM

Programming
- Format: Adult hits

Ownership
- Owner: Media Logic LLC
- Sister stations: KFTM, KNEC, KNNG, KRDZ, KSTC

History
- First air date: 2008

Technical information
- Licensing authority: FCC
- Facility ID: 166013
- Class: C2
- ERP: 38,000 watts
- HAAT: 171 meters (561 ft)
- Transmitter coordinates: 40°27′15.10″N 103°9′6.10″W

Links
- Public license information: Public file; LMS
- Webcast: Listen live
- Website: bobplaysanything.com

KSRX (97.5 FM) is a radio station licensed to Sterling, Colorado, United States. The station is owned by Media Logic LLC.
