= KNNG =

- Sterling, Colorado; United States
- Frequency: 104.7 MHz
- Branding: 104.7 KING-FM

Programming
- Format: Hot AC
- Affiliations: Premiere Networks

Ownership
- Owner: Wayne Johnson; (Media Logic LLC)
- Sister stations: KATR-FM, KFTM, KNEC, KRDZ, KSRX, KSTC

History
- Former call signs: KSTC-FM (1979–1985)
- Call sign meaning: "King"

Technical information
- Licensing authority: FCC
- Facility ID: 33001
- Class: C1
- ERP: 100,000 watts
- HAAT: 198.0 meters (649.6 ft)
- Transmitter coordinates: 40°34′57.00″N 103°1′56.00″W
- Translator: 103.1 K276CX (Sidney, Nebraska)

Links
- Public license information: Public file; LMS
- Website: 1047knng.com

KNNG (104.7 FM, King FM) is a radio station broadcasting a hot adult contemporary music format. Licensed to Sterling, Colorado, United States, the station is currently owned by Wayne Johnson, through licensee Media Logic LLC, and features programming from Premiere Networks.

== History ==
The station was assigned the call letters KSTC-FM on January 5, 1979. On March 1, 1985, the station changed its call sign to the current KNNG. KNNG started out playing top 40 music. In February 1991, KNNG segued to a very soft adult contemporary format. The station also aired hourly news and farm information. Throughout the next 25 years the station had a series of flips from Adult Contemporary to country music to top 40. Most recently KNNG now plays hit music with a rhythmic approach. It is Northeast Colorado's home for Ryan Seacrest's American Top 40.
