= KBVC =

- Buena Vista, Colorado; United States
- Frequency: 104.1 MHz
- Branding: Eagle Country

Programming
- Format: Country
- Affiliations: Citadel Media

Ownership
- Owner: Three Eagles Communications of Colorado, LLC
- Sister stations: KGKG, KVRH-FM KWUZ

History
- First air date: 1975
- Call sign meaning: K-Buena Vista, Colorado

Technical information
- Licensing authority: FCC
- Facility ID: 56386
- Class: C3
- ERP: 600 watts
- HAAT: 362.0 meters (1,187.7 ft)
- Transmitter coordinates: 38°44′45″N 106°11′55″W

Links
- Public license information: Public file; LMS
- Webcast: Listen Live
- Website: eaglecountry104.com

KBVC (104.1 FM, "Eagle Country") is a radio station broadcasting a country music format. Licensed to Buena Vista, Colorado, United States, the station is currently owned by Three Eagles Communications of Colorado, LLC and features programming from Citadel Media. Eagle Country 104 is the Upper Arkansas Valleys station playing new Country. Also provides area coverage of High school sports from Chaffee County, Colorado as well as the Upper Arkansas Valleys home for Crook & Chase Countdown and The Big Time with Whitney Allen . Eagle Country 104 also covers local news. and sports and is the Upper Arkansas Valleys affiliate of the Denver Broncos. Its also home to Country Gold, hosted by Randy Owen of the Country Super Group Alabama
