= Erwin Lambeth =

American furniture company

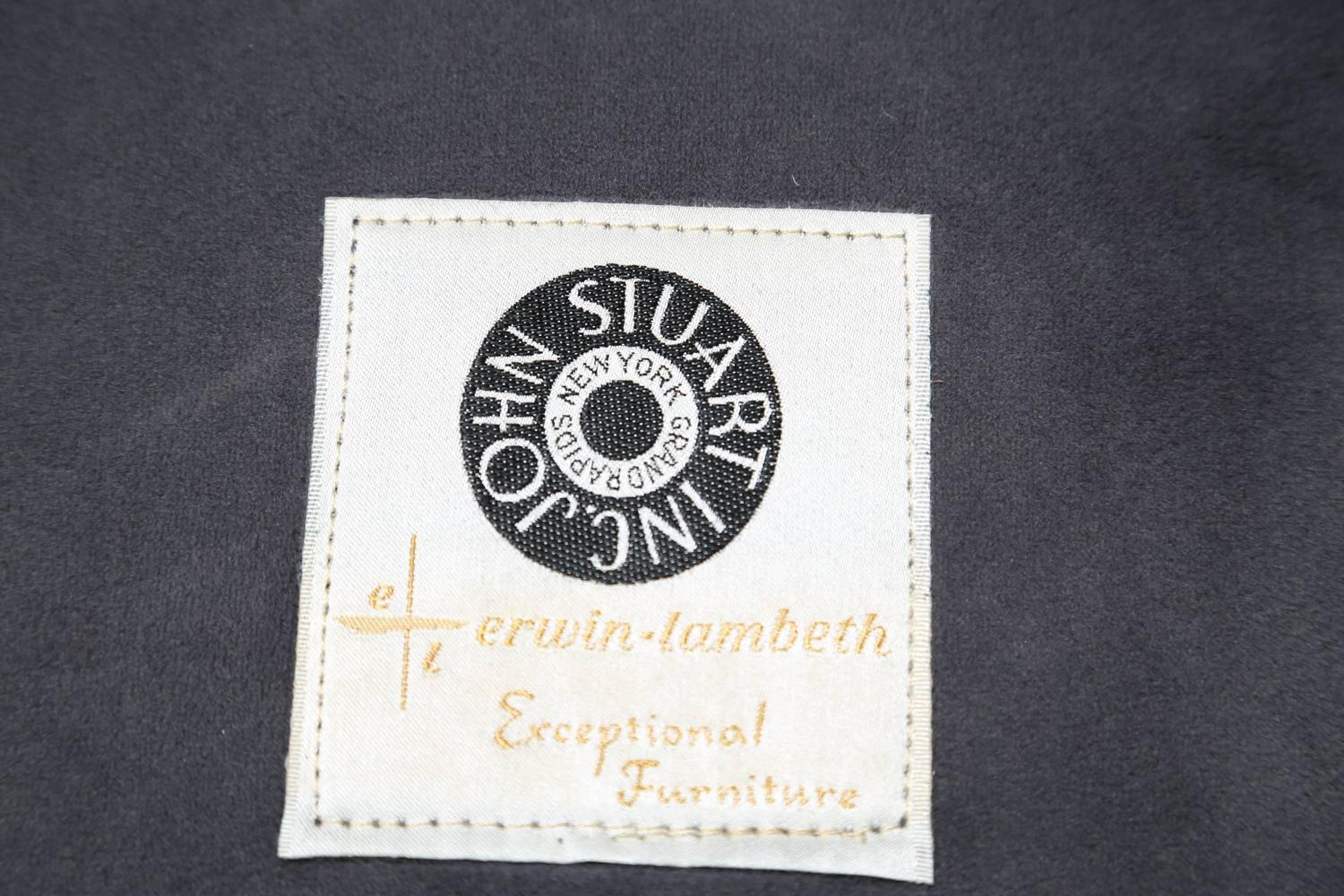

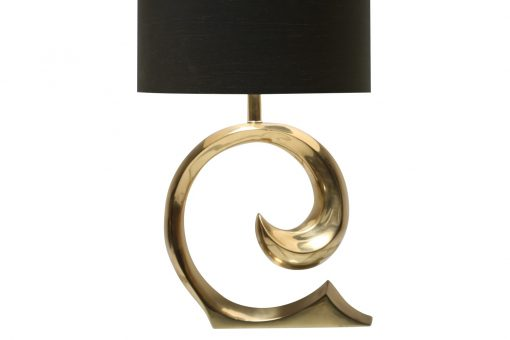
Sculptural Table Lamp by Erwin Lambeth

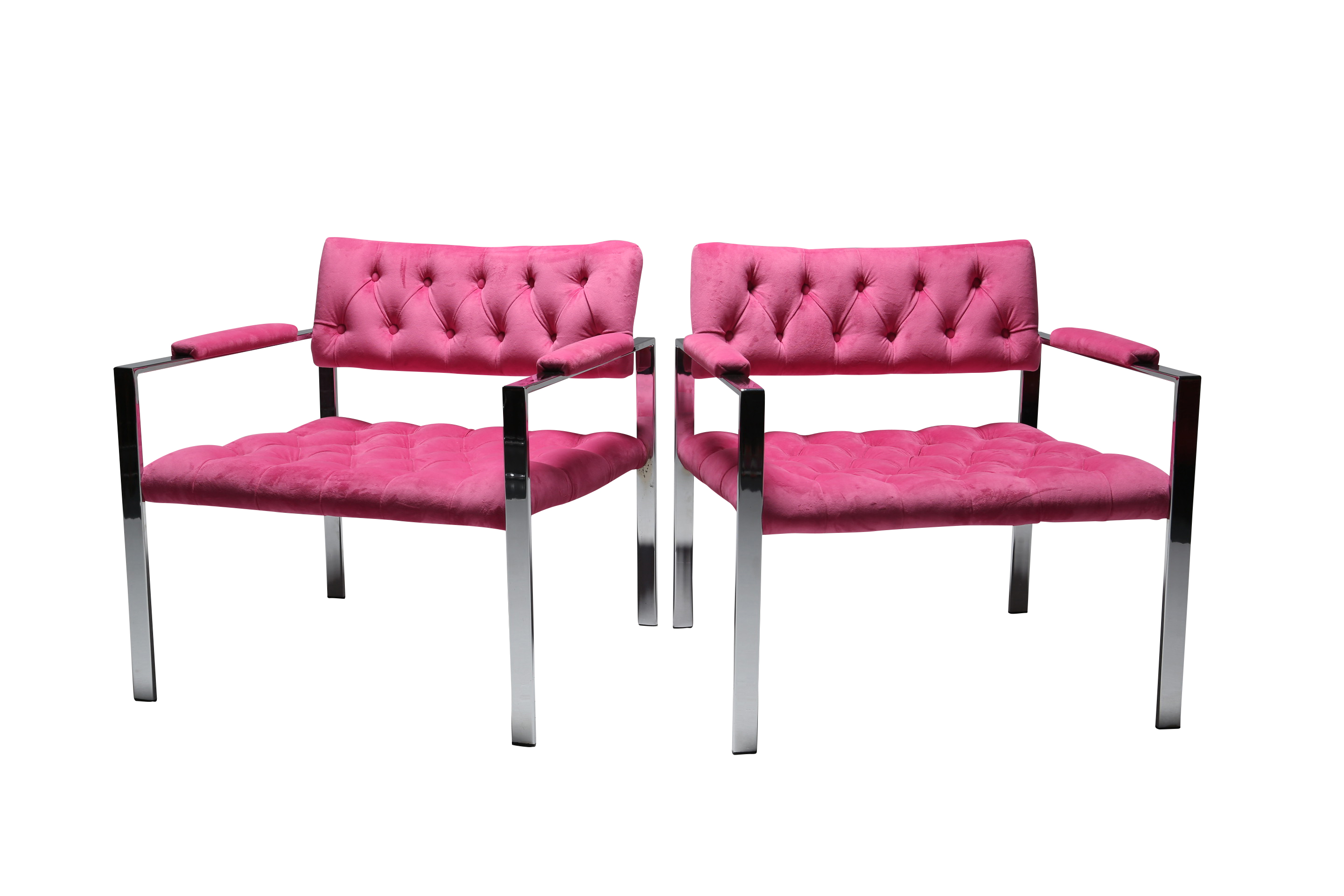
Tufted Chrome framed lounge chairs by Erwin Lambeth

Erwin-Lambeth was a furniture company in Thomasville, North Carolina, USA.

The company was founded by James Erwin Lambeth Sr, in 1902 as the Standard Chair Company. In 1947 James Erwin Lambeth Jr and his wife Katherine Lambeth renamed it the Erwin-Lambeth company. They built a new plant with the aim to create furniture specifically for the design trade.

A designer, Katherine Lambreth was the first president of the company. Erwin-Lambreth produced high-end mid century furniture and accessories such as table lamps. It merged with Tomlinson's in the late 1980s.

Erwin-Lambreth pieces can be mistaken for designs by Milo Baughman, Pierre Cardin and Selig.

== See also ==
- Thomasville Furniture Industries
