= KATR =

KATR may refer to:

- KATR-FM, a radio station (98.3 FM) licensed to Otis, Colorado, United States, known as KATR-FM since 1989
- KGRE (AM), a radio station (1450 AM) licensed to Greeley, Colorado, United States, known as KATR from 1986 to 1989
- KSCR (AM), a defunct radio station (1230 AM) formerly licensed to Eugene, Oregon, United States, known as KATR from 1962 to 1985
