= KLOE-FM =

Radio station in Goodland, Kansas

- Goodland, Kansas; United States
- Broadcast area: Northwestern Kansas
- Frequency: 102.5 MHz
- Branding: RockIt 102.5 KLOE

Programming
- Format: Classic rock
- Affiliations: Denver Broncos Radio Network

Ownership
- Owner: Kansas Broadcast Company, LLC
- Sister stations: KRDQ; KWGB; KXXX

History
- First air date: 1990
- Former call signs: KBOC (1987–1988, CP); KKCI (1990–2026)
- Call sign meaning: Carried over from former sister station KLOE (AM)

Technical information
- Licensing authority: FCC
- Facility ID: 18076
- Class: C1
- ERP: 100,000 watts
- HAAT: 216 meters (709 ft)
- Transmitter coordinates: 39°23′24″N 101°33′35″W

Links
- Public license information: Public file; LMS
- Webcast: Listen live
- Website: nwksradio.net/rockit1025

KLOE-FM (102.5 FM) is a radio station licensed to Goodland, Kansas. The station broadcasts a classic rock format and is owned by Kansas Broadcast Company, LLC.

== History ==
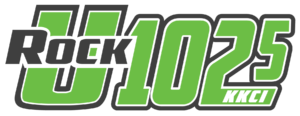
Previous logo

In 2016, Rocking M Radio rebranded KKCI to "102.5 U-Rock", with no changes to the classic rock format.

After Rocking M Media filed for chapter 11 bankruptcy in March 2022, the bankruptcy court approved an auction for the company's properties in November 2023, to take place in February 2024. At the auction, Kyle Bauer's Kansas Broadcast Company acquired KKCI and KLOE, along with eight other Kansas radio stations in Colby, Dodge City, and Liberal, for $2,845,500. The new owners rebranded KKCI to "RockIt 102.5" in August 2024, with no changes to the format or programming.

After KLOE's tower was destroyed in December 2025, Kansas Broadcast Company elected to close the AM station and move its "Good Neighbor Hour" morning show to KKCI. To preserve the KLOE call sign, KKCI became KLOE-FM at 1:02 p.m. on January 26, 2026.
