= KRDZ =

- Wray, Colorado; United States
- Frequency: 1440 kHz
- Branding: 1440/106.9 KRDZ

Programming
- Format: Classic hits
- Affiliations: Local Radio Networks; Denver Broncos Radio Network

Ownership
- Owner: Media Logic, LLC
- Sister stations: KATR-FM, KFTM, KNEC, KNNG, KSRX, KSTC

History
- First air date: 1978; 48 years ago
- Former call signs: KRDZ (1978–1982); KRQZ (1982–1987)

Technical information
- Licensing authority: FCC
- Facility ID: 48395
- Class: D
- Power: 5,000 watts (day); 212 watts (night)
- Transmitter coordinates: 40°4′54.8″N 102°11′27.9″W
- Translator: 106.9 K295CS (Wray)

Links
- Public license information: Public file; LMS
- Webcast: Listen Live
- Website: krdz.com

KRDZ (1440 AM, "1440/106.9 Classic Hits") is a radio station broadcasting a classic hits music format. Licensed to Wray, Colorado, United States, the station is currently owned by Media Logic, LLC and features programming from Westwood One.

== History ==
The station was assigned the call letters KRQZ on October 5, 1982. On October 9, 1987, the station changed its call sign to the current KRDZ.
