= KPMX =

- Sterling, Colorado; United States
- Frequency: 105.7 MHz

Programming
- Format: Hot adult contemporary

Ownership
- Owner: Northeast Colorado Broadcasting, LLC
- Sister stations: KSIR, KPRB

History
- First air date: August 19, 1983 (as KVRS)
- Former call signs: KVRS (1982–1984); KMXX (1984–1990)

Technical information
- Licensing authority: FCC
- Facility ID: 4155
- Class: C3
- ERP: 12,000 watts
- HAAT: 146.0 meters (479.0 ft)
- Transmitter coordinates: 40°31′57″N 103°7′24″W

Links
- Public license information: Public file; LMS
- Webcast: Listen live
- Website: kpmx.com

KPMX (105.7 FM) is a radio station that broadcasts a hot adult contemporary music format. Licensed to Sterling, Colorado, United States, the station is owned and operated by Northeast Colorado Broadcasting, LLC.

== History ==
The station was assigned the call sign KVRS on January 11, 1982. On October 10, 1984, the call sign was changed to KMXX. On May 7, 1990, the call sign was changed to the current KPMX.
