= KSTC =

KSTC may refer to:

- Emporia State University, formerly Kansas State Teachers College (KSTC), located in Emporia, Kansas
- KSTC (AM), a radio station (1230 AM) licensed to Sterling, Colorado, United States
- KSTC-TV, a television station (RF channel 30, virtual 5.2, cable 45) licensed to Minneapolis-St. Paul, Minnesota, United States
- the ICAO code for St. Cloud Regional Airport
