= KGKG =

- Salida, Colorado; United States
- Frequency: 1340 kHz
- Branding: The Valley 102.9

Programming
- Language: English
- Format: 1980's hits

Ownership
- Owner: Headwaters Media, L.L.C.
- Sister stations: KVRH; KWUZ; KBVC

History
- First air date: 1948 (as KVRH)
- Former call signs: KVRH (1948–2017)

Technical information
- Licensing authority: FCC
- Facility ID: 1019
- Class: C
- Power: 1,000 watts (unlimited)
- Transmitter coordinates: 38°31′55″N 106°0′54″W
- Translator: 102.9 K275CR (Salida)

Links
- Public license information: Public file; LMS
- Webcast: Listen live
- Website: heartoftherockiesradio.com

KGKG (1340 kHz) is a radio station broadcasting a 1980's hits format. Licensed to Salida, Colorado, United States, the station is currently owned by Headwaters Media, L.L.C.

KGKG began broadcasting in 1948, as KVRH, and is the first station to be broadcast in the Upper Arkansas Valley. In 2003, it was flipped to an oldies format, then on April 1, 2009, the station was flipped to a news/talk station.

On November 1, 2009, KVRH changed their format from talk to adult standards. In 2011, after KWUZ flipped its format from a classic hits format, to Hippie Radio format, KVRH flipped its format to classic country. KVRH along with sister station KBVC carries Denver Broncos football via 850 KOA with Dave Logan and Ed McCaffrey.

The station changed its call sign to the current KGKG on June 29, 2017.

On January 1, 2021, KGKG changed their format from classic rock to 1980's hits, branded as "The Valley 102.9".
