= Fort Hays Tech Northwest =

Public technical college in Goodland, Kansas

Fort Hays Tech | Northwest
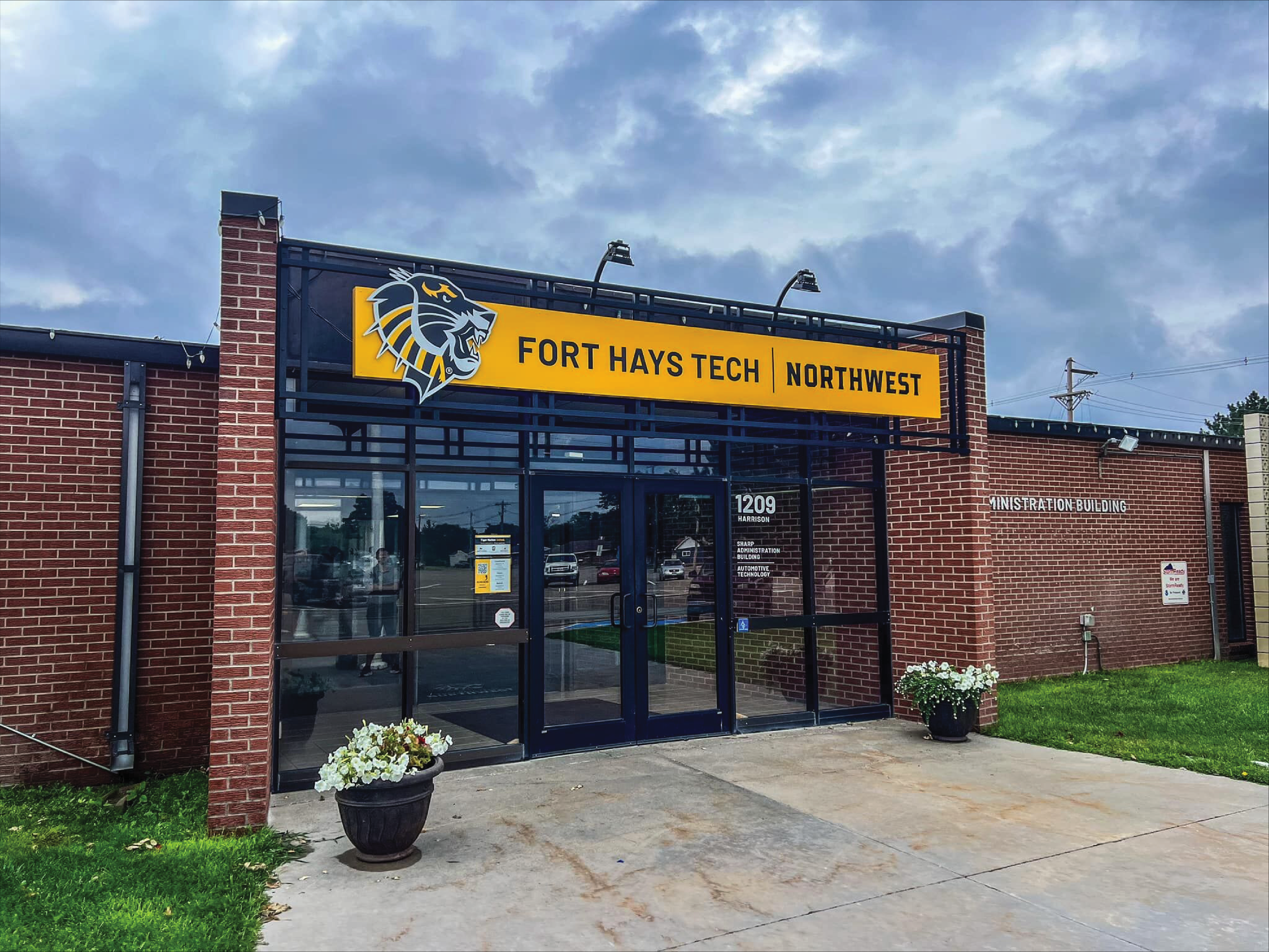
- Administration Building (2024)
- Former names: Northwest Kansas Area Vocational Technical School (1964-2001), Northwest Kansas Technical College (2001-2024)
- Type: Public technical college
- Established: 1964
- Students: 725 (Fall 2023)
- Location: Goodland, Kansas, United States; 39.3463°N 101.7009°W
- Campus: Rural
- Colors: Black and gold
- Mascot: Tigers
- Website: fhnw.edu

Fort Hays Tech | Northwest (formerly Northwest Kansas Technical College) is a public technical college in Goodland, Kansas, United States. The college offers 19 different programs ranging from diesel technology to medical assistant. The college also offers certificates and associate degrees.

== History ==
The college began in 1964 as the Northwest Kansas Area Vocational Technical School. In 2001, the name was changed to Northwest Kansas Technical College. In 2024, the name was updated to Fort Hays Tech | Northwest.

== Athletics ==
Fort Hays Tech | Northwest is the only technical school in Kansas with an athletic program. It is a member of the Kansas Jayhawk Community College Conference. Men's and women's basketball, men's and women's wrestling, softball, track and field, cross-country and shooting sports are currently offered. The Tigers usually hold their events at facilities owned by Goodland High School.
