= KFBC =

- Cheyenne, Wyoming; United States
- Broadcast area: Cheyenne metropolitan area
- Frequency: 1240 kHz
- Branding: KFBC AM 1240

Programming
- Format: Sports
- Affiliations: Westwood One Sports; Colorado Rockies Radio Network; Denver Broncos Radio Network

Ownership
- Owner: Montgomery Broadcasting LLC

History
- First air date: December 1940

Technical information
- Licensing authority: FCC
- Facility ID: 43629
- Class: C
- Power: 700 watts (unlimited)
- Transmitter coordinates: 41°7′17″N 104°50′22″W
- Translator: 97.5 K248CZ (Cheyenne)

Links
- Public license information: Public file; LMS
- Webcast: Listen live
- Website: kfbcradio.com

KFBC (1240 AM) is a radio station licensed to Cheyenne, Wyoming, United States, and targets the entire market. Owned by Montgomery Broadcasting, LLC, the station carries a sports format with programming from Westwood One Sports and is the flagship of the Cowboy State News Network. Additionally, KFBC is a part-time affiliate of the Denver Broncos and Colorado Rockies radio networks (both through KOA) as well as the Wyoming Cowboys.

== History ==
KFBC is the oldest surviving radio station in Cheyenne. It was founded in December 1940 by Tracy McCracken, publisher of the Wyoming State Tribune and Wyoming Eagle (since merged as the Wyoming Tribune Eagle). Records indicate it was originally located on 1450.

Soon after signing on, KFBC forced Cheyenne's original radio station, KYAN on 1400, off the air. In 1941 (or 1942 depending on the source), KYAN's owners sold their facilities to KFBC.

KFBC originally was an independent station before becoming an affiliate of NBC Blue, before going independent again. From the very start, KFBC was very sports orientated, being the first to hire Curt Gowdy as a broadcaster. The McCracken family started KFBC-TV (now KGWN-TV) in 1954, effectively making the two sister outlets, along with the Wyoming Tribune Eagle.

KFBC's logo under previous news/talk format held in the early 21st century

KFBC's logo before its CBS Sports Radio affiliation rebranded as Infinity Sports Network

In the 21st century, KFBC took on a news/talk format omnipresent of post-golden era stations, while including some sports, like the Motor Racing Network. A massive shake-up of Cheyenne AM affiliations occurred between 2006 and 2016; fellow station KRAE went from classic country to ESPN to oldies. Upon KRAE's switch from sports to oldies, KFBC took up the position as Cheyenne's sports station, which the station management regarded well. Meanwhile, KGAB picked up KFBC's news and talk status. Both KFBC and former sister station '92.9 The Boss' launched Christmas Cash in the 2010s, a give-away contest that continues to exist as of the 2020 Holiday season. In the 2020s, KFBC continues to serve as Cheyenne's Infinity Sports Network station and will occasionally air local games and events. Recently, the station will play music during fireworks, mainly for 4th of July, and now for New Year's Day fireworks.

== Signal ==
KFBC puts out a continuous 700 watts of non-directional power which provides local coverage to Cheyenne and the surrounding area, while it can be marginally heard in Western Nebraska, Northern Colorado (even Fort Collins), and some of South-east Wyoming. KFBC is unusual in the fact that Class C stations are normally 1,000 watts, such as KRAL. The station is on one of six shared-local frequencies (the others are 1230, 1340, 1400, 1450, and 1490), informally referred to as the "graveyard" frequencies, because of the excessive number of stations. Because of this, the skywave (night-time) signal mixes with several others, thus limiting its usefulness to its groundwave signal. However, a skilled operator with a very directional antenna may separate it from the rest, upwards of 300 miles.

To provide another option, as well as to take advantage of AM Revitalization, KFBC signed on translator K248CZ (97.5 FM), located Downtown at 250 watts, just a few miles away from the KFBC tower. This signal provides a local grade signal to the city itself, and depending on the conditions, can extend to the Nebraska Panhandle, much like its parent station. This is more likely to happen at night or when there is more humidity in the air. In general, the translator copies everything from the KFBC broadcast; it even broadcasts in mono, a rarity for modern-day FM translators, although still the standard for some AM stations.

== Programming ==
KFBC is mostly a pass-through for Westwood One Sports, but occasionally airs local programming. It produces two local shows each weekday. During the weekend, it is a full simulcast of the Westwood One Sports national feed, aside from live sports coverage.
