= Colby City Hall =

- U.S. National Register of Historic Places
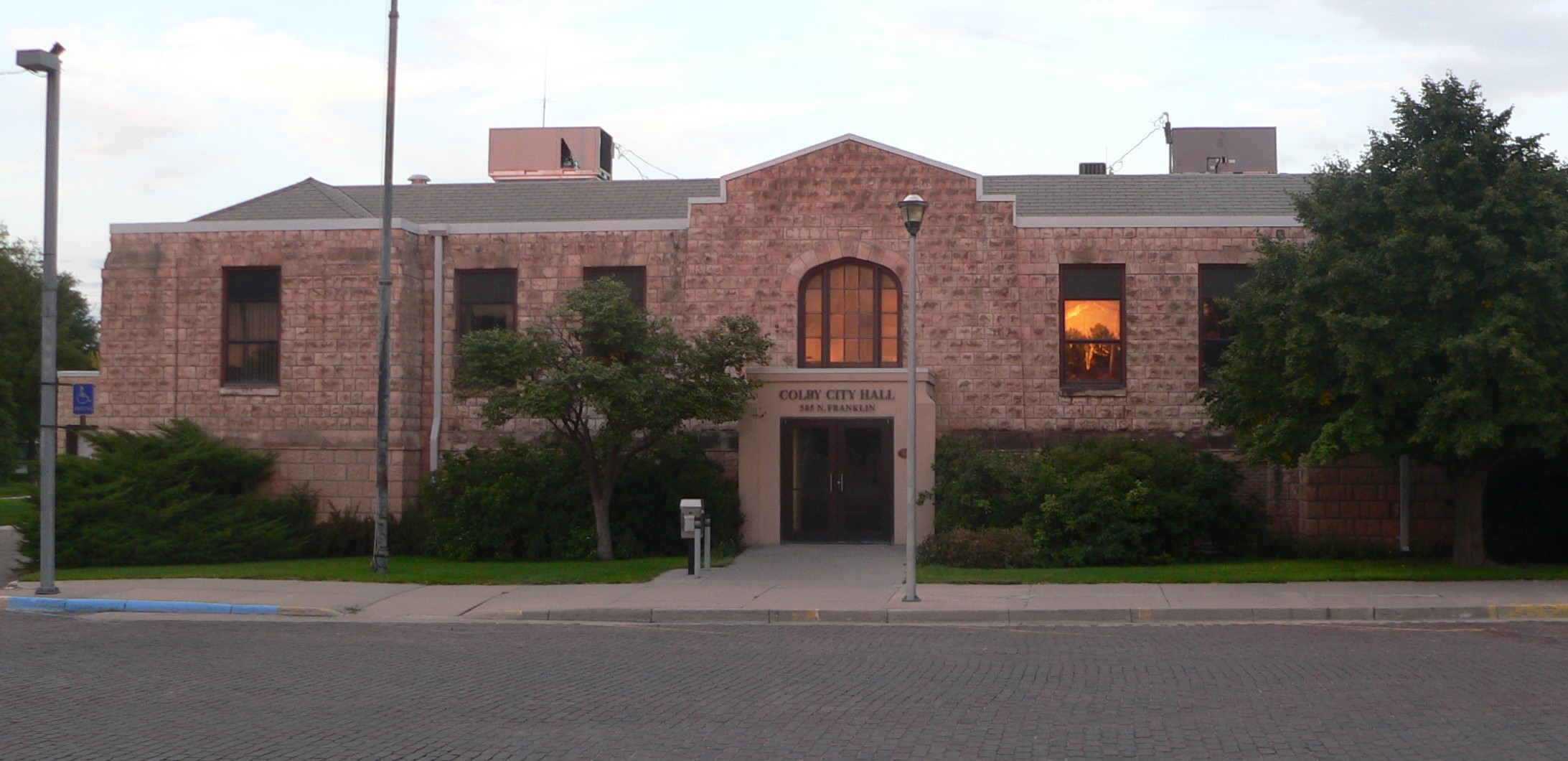

- Location within Kansas
- Location: 585 N. Franklin Ave., Colby, Kansas
- Coordinates: 39.39883°N 101.04553°W
- Area: 0.5 acres (0.20 ha)
- Built: 1936
- Architect: Suite and Blanchard
- Architectural style: Art Deco
- MPS: New Deal-Era Resources of Kansas MPS
- NRHP reference No.: 03001259
- Added to NRHP: December 10, 2003

The Colby City Hall, in Colby, Kansas at 585 N. Franklin Ave., was built in 1936. It was listed on the National Register of Historic Places in 2003. It was designed by architects Suite and Blanchard of Garden City, Kansas. Its design is Art Deco architecture. It has functioned as a City Hall; Meeting Hall; Library; Correctional Facility; and Fire Station.

== See also ==
- National Register of Historic Places listings in Kansas
