= KRDQ =

- Colby, Kansas; United States
- Broadcast area: Northwestern Kansas
- Frequency: 100.3 MHz
- Branding: 100.3 The Ride

Programming
- Format: Hot adult contemporary
- Affiliations: SRN News; Premiere Networks; Kansas City Chiefs; Kansas State Wildcats

Ownership
- Owner: Kansas Broadcast Company, LLC
- Sister stations: KLOE-FM; KWGB; KXXX

History
- First air date: 1971 (as KXXX-FM)
- Former call signs: KXXX-FM (1971–1983); KQLS (1983–2008)

Technical information
- Licensing authority: FCC
- Facility ID: 37124
- Class: C1
- ERP: 100,000 watts
- HAAT: 186 meters (610 ft)
- Transmitter coordinates: 39.48075°N 100.90955°W

Links
- Public license information: Public file; LMS
- Webcast: Listen live
- Website: nwksradio.com

KRDQ (100.3 FM) is a radio station licensed to Colby, Kansas. KRDQ airs a hot adult contemporary format and is owned by Kansas Broadcast Company.
