= Goodland City Library =

- U.S. National Register of Historic Places
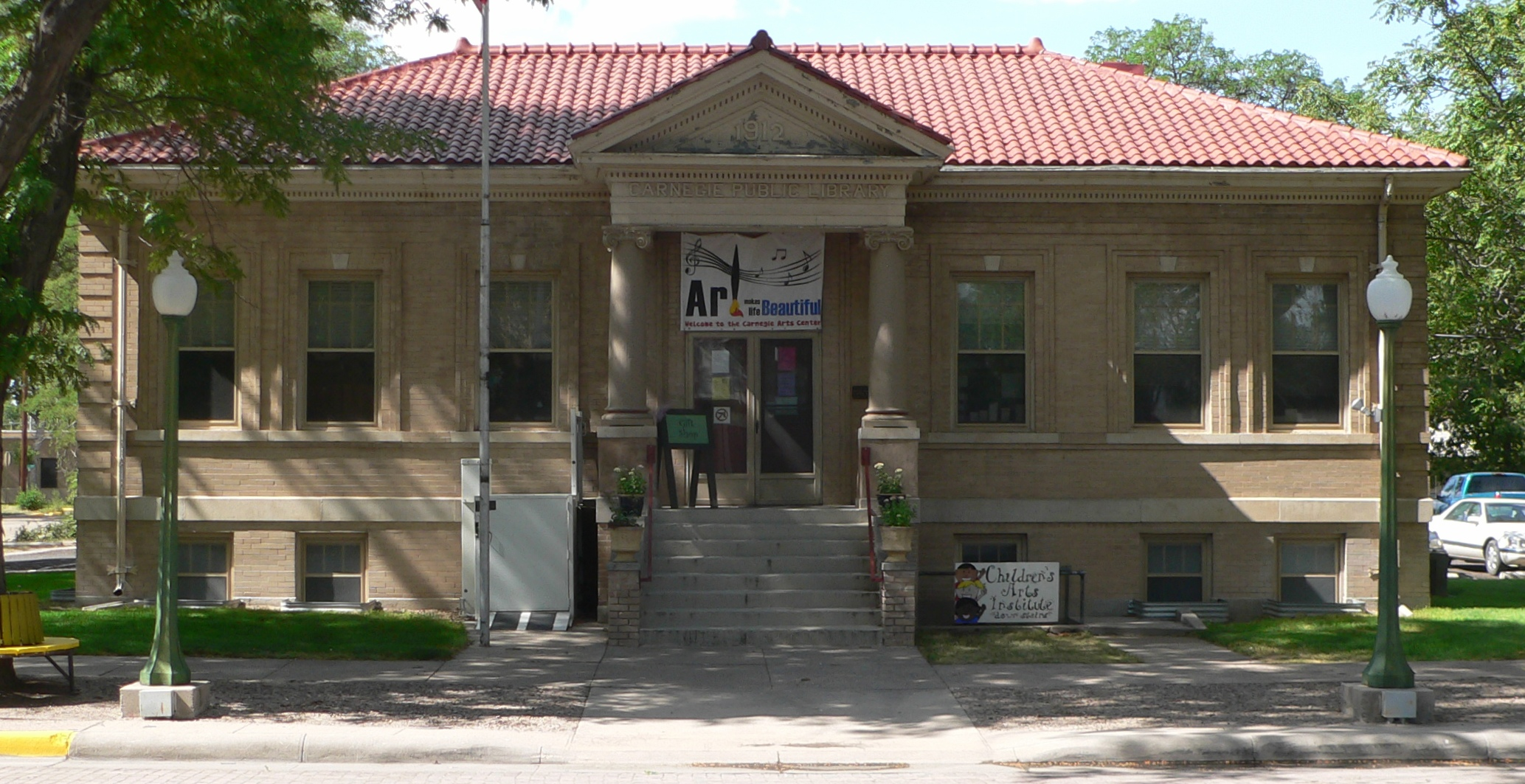

- Location within Kansas Location within the United States
- Location: 120 W. 12th St., Goodland, Kansas
- Coordinates: 39°20′49″N 101°42′45″W
- Area: less than one acre
- Built: 1912
- Built by: Hunt, Fred
- Architect: Barresen Bros.
- Architectural style: Renaissance, Italian Renaissance Revival
- NRHP reference No.: 85002129
- Added to NRHP: September 13, 1985

The Goodland City Library, at 120 W. 12th St. in Goodland, Kansas was built in 1912 and was used as a library for 60 years. It was designed with Italian Renaissance Revival architecture by Denver architects Barrensen Brothers. It was one of 59 Carnegie libraries in Kansas; it was funded initially by a $10,000 Carnegie grant.

The building now houses the Carnegie Arts Center, which offers art exhibits, workshops, recitals, demonstrations, lectures and concerts.

It was listed on the National Register of Historic Places in 1985. It was deemed significant for its architecture and its "association with the cultural and educational history of the community."
