= Colby Municipal Airport =

Airport in Kansas, United States

Colby Municipal Airport Shalz Field
- IATA: CBK; ICAO: KCBK; FAA LID: CBK

Summary
- Airport type: Public
- Owner: City of Colby
- Serves: Colby, Kansas
- Elevation AMSL: 3,187 ft (971 m)
- Coordinates: 39°25′39″N 101°02′48″W

Map
- Location within Kansas Location within the United States

Runways
| Direction | Length | | Surface |
| Direction | ft | m | Surface |
|---|---|---|---|
| 17/35 | 5,110 | 1,558 | Concrete |
| 12/30 | 2,660 | 811 | Turf |
| 4/22 | 2,600 | 792 | Turf |

Statistics
- Aircraft operations (2021): 5,550
- Based aircraft (2022): 24
- Sources: airport web page and FAA

Colby Municipal Airport or Shalz Field (IATA: CBK, ICAO: KCBK, FAA LID: CBK) is on Kansas Highway 25, two miles (3 km) north of Colby, in Thomas County, Kansas.

The airport's page at the Kansas Department of Transportation Airport Directory lists the name as Shaltz Field, but that spelling is incorrect as per the Federal Register dated March 8, 2004.

== Facilities ==
Shalz Field covers 473 acres (191 ha); its concrete runway, 17/35, is 5,110 x 75 ft (1,558 x 23 m). It has two turf runways: 12/30 is 2,660 x 90 ft (811 x 27 m) and 4/22 is 2,600 x 80 ft (792 x 24 m).

In the year ending September 18, 2021 the airport had 5,550 aircraft operations, an average of 15 per day: 99% general aviation and 1% military. In April 2022, there were 24 aircraft based at this airport: 21 single-engine, 2 multi-engine and 1 helicopter.

== History ==
The Colby airport had commuter airline service in the late 1960s/early 1970s by Air Midwest with nonstop flights to Denver as well as flights to Wichita making stops in Great Bend and Hutchison, Kansas. Air Midwest used Cessna 402 aircraft.

== See also ==
- List of airports in Kansas
