= Milo Baughman =

American furniture designer (1923–2003)

Milo Ray Baughman, Jr. (October 7, 1923 – July 23, 2003) born in Goodland, Kansas, was a modern furniture designer.

Baughman designed for a number of furniture companies starting in the mid-1940s until his death, including Mode Furniture, Glenn of California, The Inco Company, Pacific Iron, Murray Furniture of Winchendon, Arch Gordon, George Kovacs, Directional, and Drexel, among others. He is most well known, however, for his longtime association with Thayer Coggin Inc., of High Point, NC, which began in 1953 and lasted until his death in 2003.

He also lectured broadly on the state of modern design, extolling the positive benefits of good design on the lives of human being.

== Early life ==
Baughman moved with his family in his infancy to Long Beach, California. At the age of 13, Milo was assigned the task of designing both the interior and exterior of his family's new house. Following high school he served for four years in the Army Air Forces during World War II, during which time he was active in designing officer's clubs. After the war he returned to Southern California to study product and architectural design at the Art Center School of Los Angeles and at Chouinard Art Institute, which later became the California Institute of the Arts.

== Design career ==
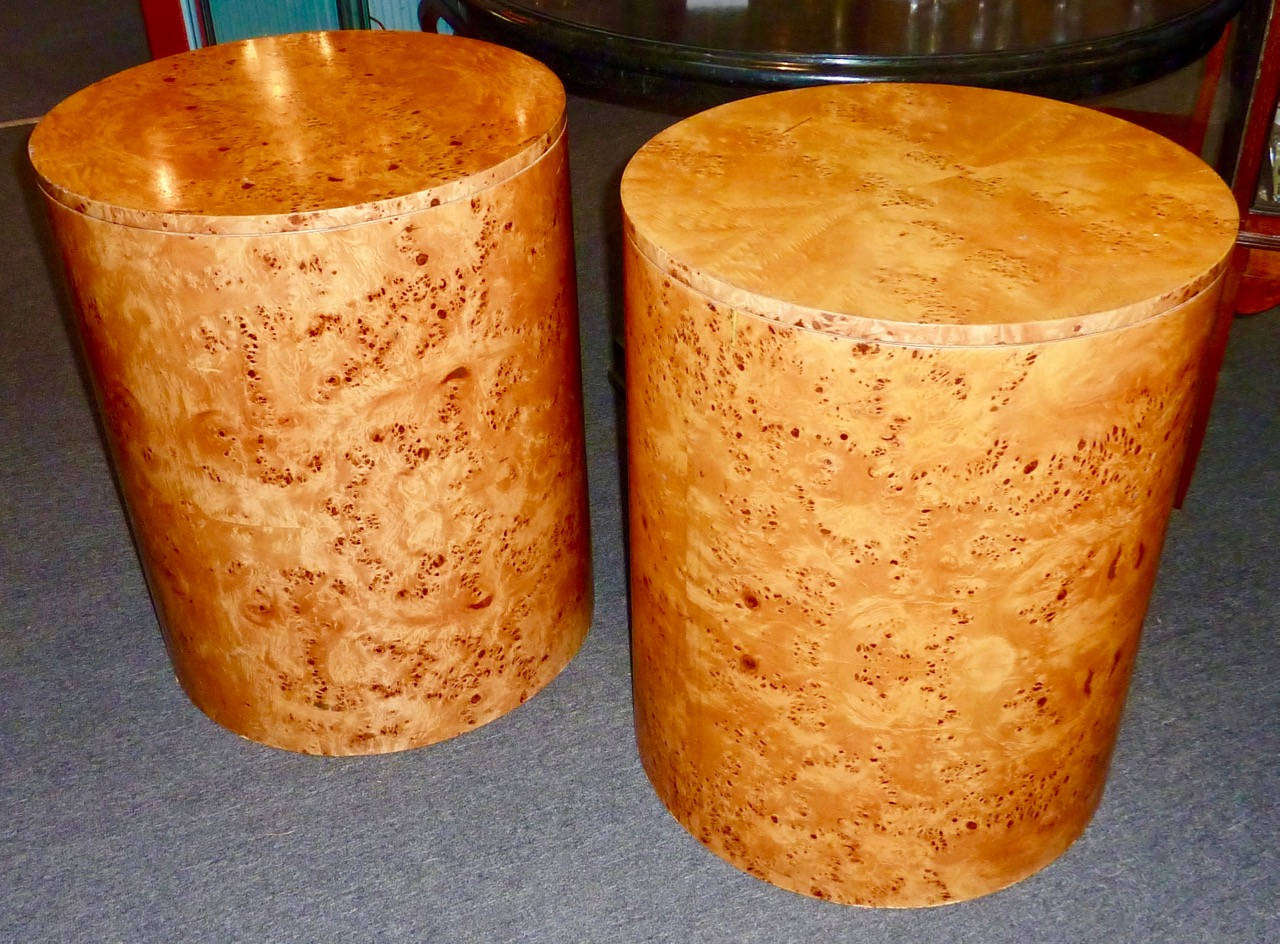
Circa 1970s Milo Baughman Design Drum Tables in Birdseye Maple.

Upon completing his studies, he was hired to work at the Frank Brothers furniture store as an interior and custom furniture designer. While there, he met Georgia Christensen, who founded and published Furniture Forum, a publication on modern design complete with photos, dimensions, pricing, as well as designer photos and biographies. He left Frank Brothers in 1947 to establish "Milo Baughman Design Inc.," and quickly did commissions for Glenn of California and Pacific Iron. The "California Modern" collection created for Glenn of California in 1950 used walnut, birch and aluminum. Next, the large furniture manufacturer Drexel invited him to their North Carolina headquarters to create three collections. Following this, Murray Furniture of Winchendon Massachusetts introduced "The Milo Baughman Collection" in 1953. During this time, Milo ran his own custom design shop with Olga Lee (his wife at the time) in Los Angeles from 1951–1953. Lee contributed hand printed fabrics, wallpaper, lamps and accessories to go alongside Baughman's furniture designs; both offered their services as interior consultants. The Baughman-Lee showroom was located at 744 1/2 North La Cienega Blvd., Los Angeles.

In 1953, his 50-year association with Thayer Coggin Inc. began. "In a way, Thayer and Milo got their start together," according to Dot Coggin, Thayer’s wife. "Milo came here when the company was in its organizational stage. Thayer was looking for a designer and their relationship began with a handshake agreement." By the 1960s and 1970s, his new collection presented at the High Point Market every year. Some of his most well-known designs come from this period, including the "951-103" chair, c. 1962, "820–400" chaise (1954), "989–103" Lounge Chair, and "955-304" Sofa.

In addition to the "High Styles" show at the Whitney Museum of Art in New York City, Baughman's furniture has been exhibited in museums and shows throughout the United States, including the Southeastern Center for Contemporary Art in Winston-Salem, NC; the North Carolina Museum of Art in Raleigh. Milo Baughman was inducted into the Furniture Designer's Hall of Fame in 1987.

== Recent shows and reproductions ==
The Milo Baughman/Thayer Coggin Furniture Roadshow began in 2013 and continued into the following year, being held in authorized Thayer Coggin dealers and design showrooms in 21 U.S. cities: Richmond, Miami, Baton Rouge, Baltimore, New York, Naples, Boston, Columbus, Detroit, Chicago, Saint Louis, Oklahoma City, Austin, Dallas, Denver, Salt Lake City, Seattle, Portland, San Francisco, Los Angeles and San Diego. The Roadshow included designs created by Baughman and Coggin from 1953 through 2003 that have been reproduced by Thayer Coggin.

In Fall 2024, Craft Associates Furniture began reproducing 15 different Baughman designs that had been originally created for the Directional Furniture Company in the 1960s. These designs, including seating, tables, and case goods were available made-to-order through The Swanky Abode.

== New faith ==
In 1965, Baughman converted to the Church of Jesus Christ of Latter-day Saints (LDS Church), and was active and passionate about his newfound faith until his death. In 1969, he was invited by Brigham Young University in Provo, Utah to establish the Department of Environmental Design, where he remained chairman and adjunct professor for six years while he continued his professional design business. He then split his time between a farmhouse in Virginia and a home in Winston-Salem, North Carolina for twelve years, and then back to Utah in 1987, where he was a senior lecturer at BYU for another nine years. Baughman also lectured at Rhode Island School of Design, the University of Tennessee, the University of Wisconsin–Madison and North Carolina State, among others. He remained in Utah where he maintained a professional design studio until his death on July 23, 2003.
