= KPRB =

Radio station in Brush, Colorado

- Brush, Colorado; United States
- Frequency: 106.3 MHz
- Branding: B106

Programming
- Format: Adult contemporary

Ownership
- Owner: Northeast Colorado Broadcasting LLC
- Sister stations: KSIR

History
- First air date: November 2, 1998

Technical information
- Licensing authority: FCC
- Facility ID: 81409
- Class: C3
- ERP: 7,000 watts
- HAAT: 76 meters (249 ft)
- Transmitter coordinates: 40°13′2.00″N 103°41′46.10″W

Links
- Public license information: Public file; LMS
- Webcast: Listen live
- Website: b106.net

KPRB (106.3 FM) is a radio station broadcasting an adult contemporary music format. Licensed to Brush, Colorado, United States, the station is currently owned by Northeast Colorado Broadcasting LLC.
