= KXXX =

- Colby, Kansas; United States
- Broadcast area: West Kansas
- Frequency: 790 kHz

Programming
- Format: Classic country
- Affiliations: SRN News; Kansas City Royals

Ownership
- Owner: Kansas Broadcast Company, LLC
- Sister stations: KLOE-FM; KRDQ; KWGB

History
- First air date: July 1947

Technical information
- Licensing authority: FCC
- Facility ID: 37125
- Class: D
- Power: 5,000 watts (day); 24 watts {night)
- Transmitter coordinates: 39°23′35″N 101°0′7.6″W

Links
- Public license information: Public file; LMS
- Webcast: Listen live
- Website: www.ksfarm.net

KXXX (790 AM) is a radio station broadcasting a farm and classic country radio format, licensed to Colby, Kansas. The station serves the tri-state region of Northwest Kansas, Northeast Colorado and Southwest Nebraska. Nationally known personalities on the original staff were John B. Hughes, Johnny Pearson and Jerry Oppy. The station is currently owned by Kansas Broadcast Company, LLC.

== History ==
KXXX is one of the oldest radio stations serving the tri-state region of Northwest Kansas, Northeast Colorado, and Southwest Nebraska The station's history began in the years immediately following World War II. After receiving a license from the Federal Communications Commission (FCC) in April 1947, KXXX officially started broadcasting on the 790 kHz frequency on July 14, 1947. Its original broadcast studio was located in the basement of the Cooper Hotel in Colby. The original identification for the station was "Ranch and Farm Radio", though it soon changed to "Town and Country Radio". In July 1963, KXXX became a member of the CBS Radio Network.

In the late 1980s, KXXX was part of the Kansas-based "LS Network" of radio entrepreneur Larry Steckline. It is now the flagship station for the Kansas Farm and Ranch Radio Network.
