= KWUZ =

- Poncha Springs, Colorado; United States
- Frequency: 97.5 MHz
- Branding: The All New Hippie Radio 97.5

Programming
- Format: Classic hits

Ownership
- Owner: Three Eagles Communications of Colorado, LLC

History
- First air date: 2008

Technical information
- Licensing authority: FCC
- Facility ID: 164293
- Class: A
- ERP: 29 watts
- HAAT: 892.3 meters (2,927 ft)
- Transmitter coordinates: 38°27′11″N 106°1′2″W

Links
- Public license information: Public file; LMS
- Webcast: Listen Live

KWUZ 97.5 FM (The All New Hippie Radio 97.5) is a radio station with a classic hits format that is licensed to Poncha Springs, Colorado, United States. The station is currently owned by Three Eagles Communications of Colorado, LLC. In their fleet of stations includes The Peak (92.3fm) Which Plays Modern Hits, Hippie Radio (97.5fm) Which Plays Classic Rock, Eagle Country (104.1fm) Which Play's Modern Country, And The Valley (102.9fm) Which Plays 80's Hits. The news is brought by Dan R, And The local sports is by Caleb Burggraaf. On Sunday's At 7:00 Am, They Play An Episode Of "Casey Kasem's American Top 40", Which Is Followed By An Episode Of "Breakfast With The Beatles".
