= KWGB =

Radio station in Colby, Kansas

- Colby, Kansas; United States
- Broadcast area: Western Kansas
- Frequency: 97.9 MHz
- Branding: Flyover Country 97.9

Programming
- Format: Country
- Affiliations: SRN News; Kansas Jayhawks

Ownership
- Owner: Kansas Broadcast Company, LLC
- Sister stations: KLOE-FM; KRDQ; KXXX

History
- First air date: September 1, 1998

Technical information
- Licensing authority: FCC
- Facility ID: 81915
- Class: C1
- ERP: 100,000 watts
- HAAT: 216 meters (709 ft)
- Transmitter coordinates: 39°23′24″N 101°33′35″W

Links
- Public license information: Public file; LMS
- Webcast: Listen live
- Website: www.nwksradio.net/hot-country979/

KWGB (97.9 FM) is a country music radio station serving western Kansas from Colby, Kansas, United States. Its branding is "Flyover Country 97.9".

The station's history on the 97.9 MHz frequency began when it first signed on the air in September 1998.

On October 6, 2023, KWGB rebranded from "Hot Country" to "Flyover Country 97.9".

In 2024, the station was acquired in a bankruptcy auction from Rocking M Media by Kansas Broadcasting Company, LLC. KWGB-FM now operates as part of the NWKS Radio cluster serving as the broadcast home for University of Kansas football and basketball.
