= KNFO =

Coordinates: 39.315°N 106.961°W

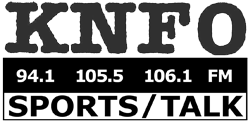
- Basalt, Colorado; United States
- Broadcast area: Aspen, Colorado
- Frequency: 106.1 MHz

Programming
- Format: News–talk

Ownership
- Owner: Patricia MacDonald Garber and Peter Benedetti; (AlwaysMountainTime, LLC)
- Sister stations: KSPN-FM

Technical information
- Licensing authority: FCC
- Facility ID: 8780
- Class: A
- ERP: 1,600 watts
- HAAT: 111 meters (364 ft)
- Translators: 105.5 K288DA (Vail, etc.); 107.5 K298AT (Rifle)

Links
- Public license information: Public file; LMS
- Website: alwaysmountaintime.com/knfo

KNFO (106.1 FM) is a radio station broadcasting a news–talk format. The station is licensed to Basalt, Colorado, United States, and serves the Aspen area. The station is owned by Patricia MacDonald Garber and Peter Benedetti, through licensee AlwaysMountainTime, LLC. The station has frequencies in Aspen, Carbondale, Glenwood Springs, and the Eagle Valley, offering local news updates. KNFO also offers sports updates about the Denver Broncos, Colorado Avalanche, CU Buffs, Colorado Rockies, and Denver Nuggets.

In addition, KNFO airs nationally syndicated shows, such as programs featuring Sean Hannity, Jim Rome, and ESPN Sports.
