= Goodland, Kansas =

City and County seat in Sherman County, Kansas, United States

- City and County seat
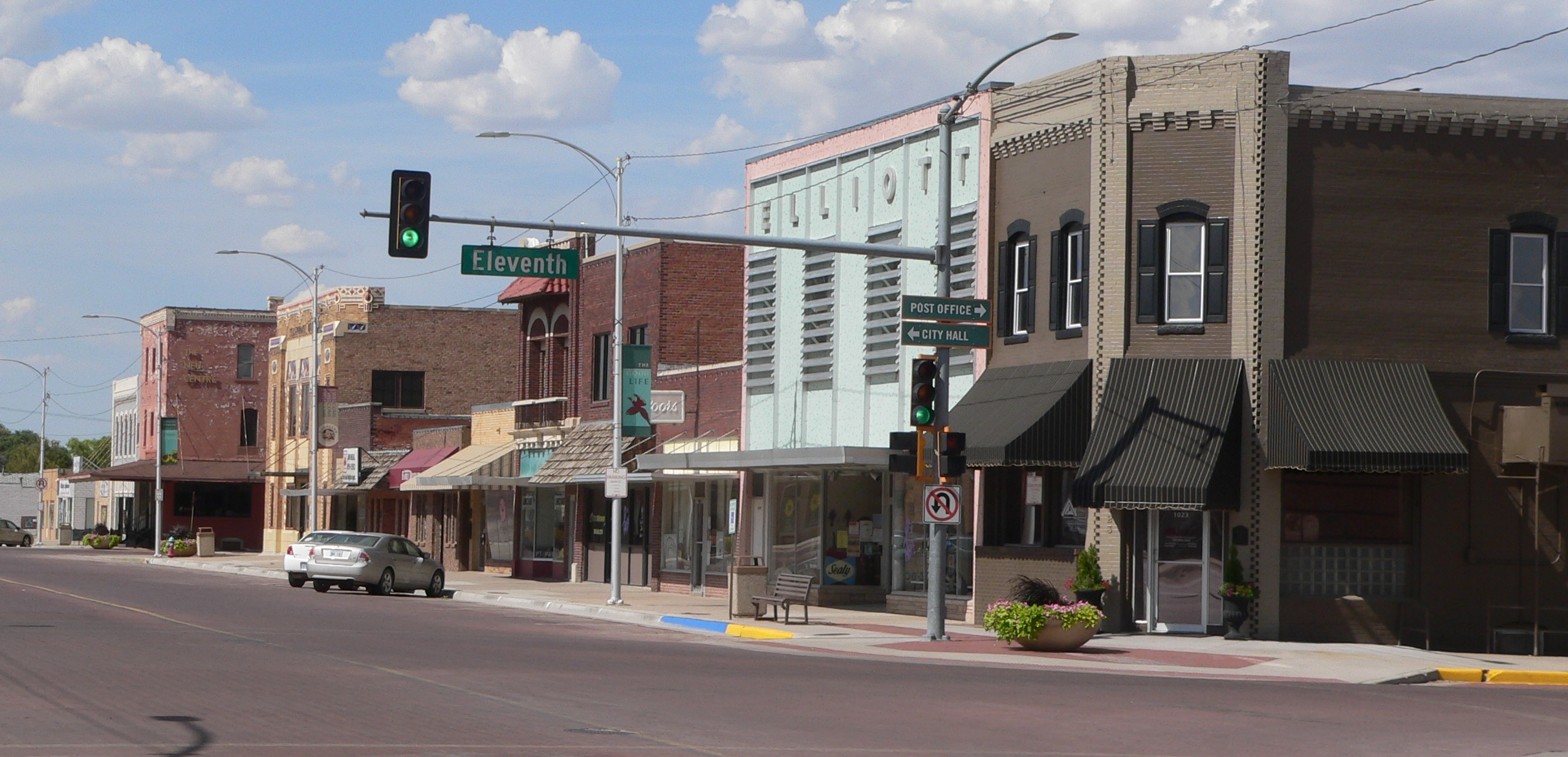
- Downtown Goodland (2012)
- Nickname: The Golden Buckle on the Wheat Belt
- Location within Sherman County and Kansas

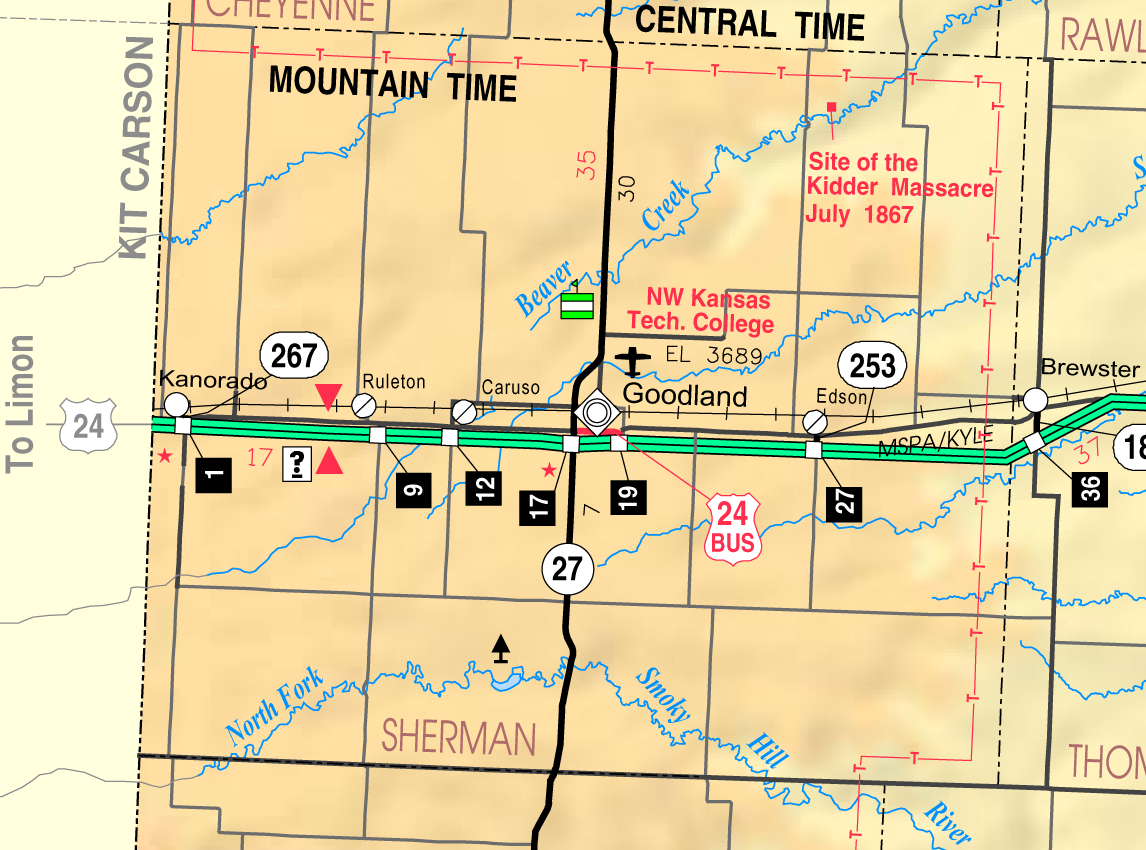
- KDOT map of Sherman County (legend)
- Coordinates: 39°20′56″N 101°42′51″W
- Country: United States
- State: Kansas
- County: Sherman
- Founded: 1887
- Incorporated: 1887
- Named for: Goodland, Indiana

Government
  - Type: Council-Manager
  - City commission: List: Aaron Thompson; JJ Howard; Jason Showalter; Brook Redlin; Ann Myers
  - City Manager: Kent Brown

Area
  - Total: 4.51 sq mi (11.67 km^{2})
  - Land: 4.50 sq mi (11.66 km^{2})
  - Water: 0.0077 sq mi (0.02 km^{2})
- Elevation: 3,691 ft (1,125 m)

Population (2020)
  - Total: 4,465
  - Density: 991.8/sq mi (382.9/km^{2})
- Time zone: UTC-7 (Mountain (MST))
  - Summer (DST): UTC-6 (MDT)
- ZIP Code: 67735
- Area code: 785
- FIPS code: 20-26875
- GNIS ID: 485583
- Website: goodlandks.gov

Goodland is a city in and the county seat of Sherman County, Kansas, United States. As of the 2020 census, the population of the city was 4,465. It was named after Goodland, Indiana. Goodland is home to Fort Hays Tech | Northwest (formerly Northwest Kansas Technical College).

== History ==
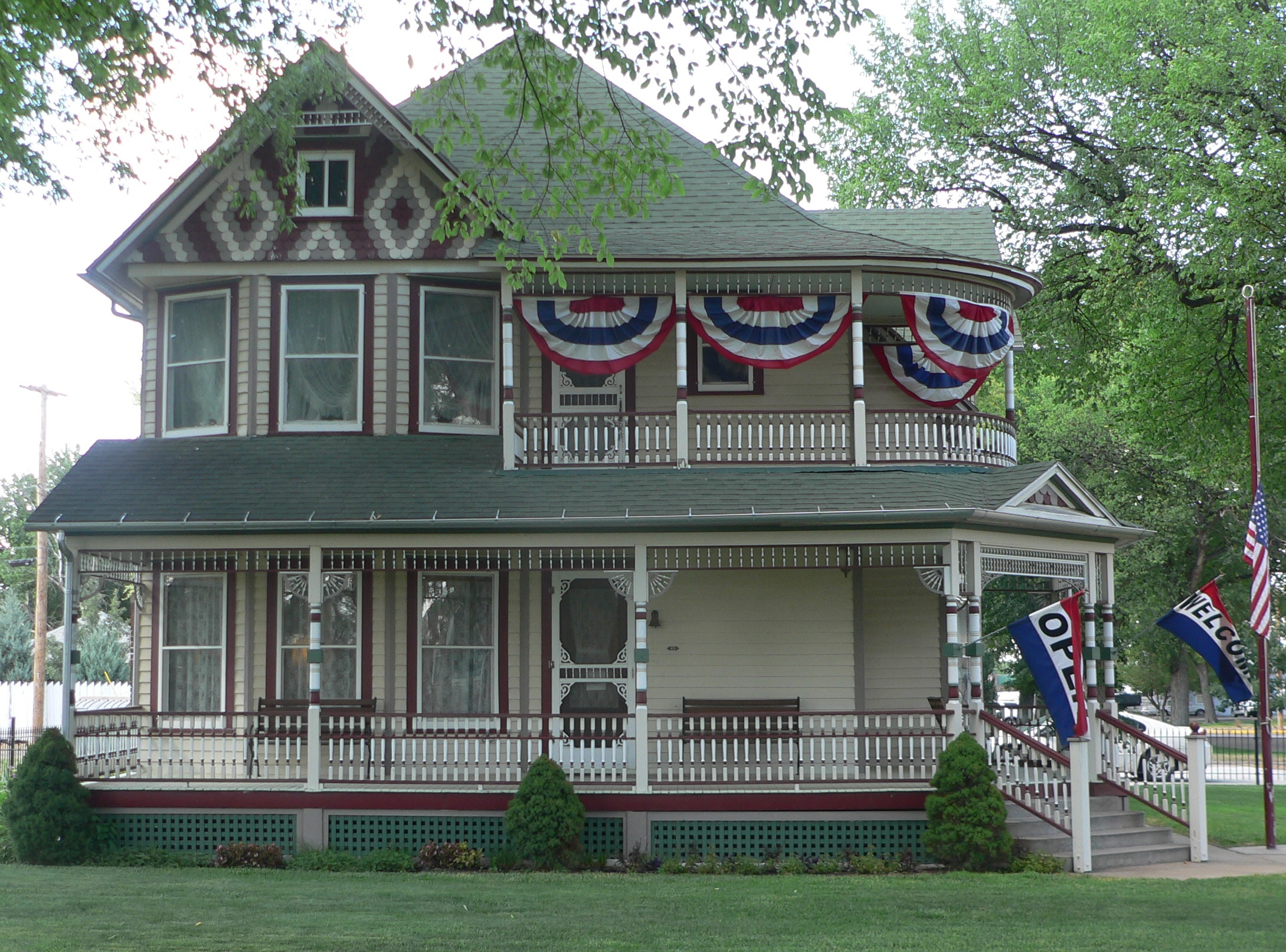
Ennis-Handy house at 202 W. 13th St (2012)

One of the earliest pieces of recorded history relating to Goodland concerns the Kidder Massacre. On July 2, 1867, a detachment of the 2nd Cavalry Regiment was massacred; second lieutenant Lyman S. Kidder in command of the party, a sergeant, a corporal, eight privates and an Indian guide lost their lives. They were carrying dispatches for Lieutenant Colonel George Custer. Later, Custer found evidence of a running battle along Beaver Creek, which led to a ravine where the remains were found. They had been killed by Cheyenne and/or Sioux Indians.

In 1886, there were four communities vying to become county seat for Sherman County: Itasca, Voltaire, Sherman Center and Eustis. A man named Clark showed up in the county in 1887 proposing to create a new town to settle the dispute. The new town was to be named Goodland. A vote for the county seat was held among the county population and Goodland won with 872 of the 1495 votes cast, while Eustis received 611 and Voltaire received 12. Citizens of Eustis declared that the votes were unfair, but the state department said that nothing could be done as all the voting was complete. The Supreme Court of Kansas considered various proceedings but did not change the outcome of the vote. Eustis refused to yield the county records it held until January 13, 1888, when an armed group from Goodland seized the records and sent them to the new county seat.

Goodland sprang up around the Chicago, Rock Island and Pacific Railroad that had been built through it. The town was named after Goodland, Indiana.

== Geography ==
Goodland lies on the south side of the Middle Fork of Sappa Creek, part of the Republican River watershed, in the High Plains region of the Great Plains. Located at the intersection of Interstate 70 and K-27 in northwestern Kansas, Goodland is roughly 17 miles (27 km) east of the Colorado state line, 176 miles east-southeast of Denver, 265 miles (426 km) northwest of Wichita, and 383 miles (616 km) west of Kansas City.

According to the United States Census Bureau, the city has a total area of 4.37 square miles (11.32 km^{2}), of which 4.36 square miles (11.29 km^{2}) is land and 0.01 square miles (0.03 km^{2}) is water.

=== Climate ===
Goodland's climate is officially classed as humid continental (Koppen Dfa); although it only just misses a semi-arid (BSk) classification and is also close to a wet-summer continental climate (Dwa). Winters are generally cold and dry, summers hot and moderately wet. The average temperature for the year is 51 °F or 10.6 °C with temperatures exceeding 90 °F or 32.2 °C an average of fifty afternoons a year and dropping below 32 °F or 0 °C an average of 159 mornings a year. Due to its higher elevation, Goodland experiences stronger wind and higher snowfall totals than other locations in Kansas. Wind speed averages 13 mph (21 km/h). On average, Goodland receives 19.75 inches or 502 millimetres of precipitation annually, and snowfall averages 41.9 inches or 1.06 metres per year. On average, January is the coolest month, and July is both the warmest month and the wettest month. The hottest temperature recorded in Goodland was 111 °F or 43.9 °C in 1940; the coldest temperature recorded was −27 °F or −32.8 °C in 1989.

Climate data for Goodland, Kansas (1991–2020 normals, extremes 1895–present)
Month	Jan	Feb	Mar	Apr	May	Jun	Jul	Aug	Sep	Oct	Nov	Dec	Year
Record high °F (°C)	79 (26)	87 (31)	92 (33)	96 (36)	104 (40)	110 (43)	111 (44)	108 (42)	105 (41)	96 (36)	87 (31)	83 (28)	111 (44)
Mean maximum °F (°C)	67.0 (19.4)	70.4 (21.3)	80.1 (26.7)	86.6 (30.3)	92.9 (33.8)	99.7 (37.6)	101.6 (38.7)	99.1 (37.3)	95.6 (35.3)	88.6 (31.4)	76.6 (24.8)	66.8 (19.3)	102.8 (39.3)
Mean daily maximum °F (°C)	43.4 (6.3)	45.8 (7.7)	56.3 (13.5)	64.0 (17.8)	73.6 (23.1)	85.2 (29.6)	90.4 (32.4)	87.5 (30.8)	80.1 (26.7)	66.6 (19.2)	53.7 (12.1)	43.8 (6.6)	65.9 (18.8)
Daily mean °F (°C)	30.2 (−1.0)	32.3 (0.2)	41.4 (5.2)	49.3 (9.6)	59.6 (15.3)	70.7 (21.5)	76.1 (24.5)	73.6 (23.1)	65.3 (18.5)	51.8 (11.0)	39.6 (4.2)	30.8 (−0.7)	51.7 (10.9)
Mean daily minimum °F (°C)	16.9 (−8.4)	18.9 (−7.3)	26.5 (−3.1)	34.6 (1.4)	45.5 (7.5)	56.2 (13.4)	61.7 (16.5)	59.8 (15.4)	50.6 (10.3)	37.1 (2.8)	25.5 (−3.6)	17.8 (−7.9)	37.6 (3.1)
Mean minimum °F (°C)	−2.7 (−19.3)	0.3 (−17.6)	8.5 (−13.1)	20.8 (−6.2)	30.9 (−0.6)	44.4 (6.9)	52.8 (11.6)	50.4 (10.2)	36.3 (2.4)	20.2 (−6.6)	8.8 (−12.9)	−0.9 (−18.3)	−8.4 (−22.4)
Record low °F (°C)	−26 (−32)	−24 (−31)	−20 (−29)	0 (−18)	21 (−6)	31 (−1)	40 (4)	38 (3)	19 (−7)	0 (−18)	−12 (−24)	−27 (−33)	−27 (−33)
Average precipitation inches (mm)	0.32 (8.1)	0.47 (12)	0.88 (22)	1.69 (43)	2.81 (71)	2.96 (75)	3.08 (78)	3.06 (78)	1.40 (36)	1.41 (36)	0.54 (14)	0.47 (12)	19.09 (485)
Average snowfall inches (cm)	4.7 (12)	6.3 (16)	4.8 (12)	3.2 (8.1)	0.3 (0.76)	0.0 (0.0)	0.0 (0.0)	0.0 (0.0)	0.2 (0.51)	2.0 (5.1)	3.3 (8.4)	5.2 (13)	30.0 (76)
Average precipitation days (≥ 0.01 in)	4.1	4.9	5.6	8.2	10.4	9.4	9.8	9.2	5.5	5.6	4.1	4.0	80.8
Average snowy days (≥ 0.1 in)	3.7	4.0	2.8	2.0	0.1	0.0	0.0	0.0	0.1	0.9	2.5	3.3	19.4
Source: NOAA

== Demographics ==
Historical population
Census	Pop.	Note	%±
1890	1,027		—
1900	1,059		3.1%
1910	1,993		88.2%
1920	2,664		33.7%
1930	3,626		36.1%
1940	3,306		−8.8%
1950	4,690		41.9%
1960	4,459		−4.9%
1970	5,510		23.6%
1980	5,708		3.6%
1990	4,983		−12.7%
2000	4,948		−0.7%
2010	4,489		−9.3%
2020	4,465		−0.5%
U.S. Decennial Census

=== 2020 census ===
As of the 2020 census, Goodland had a population of 4,465. The median age was 36.8 years. 24.7% of residents were under the age of 18, 11.0% were from 18 to 24, 23.3% were from 25 to 44, 21.9% were from 45 to 64, and 19.2% were 65 years of age or older. For every 100 females, there were 98.0 males, and for every 100 females age 18 and over, there were 97.5 males age 18 and over.

98.3% of residents lived in urban areas, while 1.7% lived in rural areas.

The population density was 992.2 per square mile (383.1/km^{2}). Housing density was 495.1 per square mile (191.2/km^{2}).

There were 1,891 households in Goodland, of which 28.7% had children under the age of 18 living in them. Of all households, 43.6% were married-couple households, 22.3% were households with a male householder and no spouse or partner present, and 28.6% were households with a female householder and no spouse or partner present. About 36.6% of all households were made up of individuals, and 16.3% had someone living alone who was 65 years of age or older.

There were 2,228 housing units, of which 15.1% were vacant. The homeowner vacancy rate was 2.9% and the rental vacancy rate was 17.7%.

Racial composition as of the 2020 census
Race	Number	Percent
White	3,698	82.8%
Black or African American	97	2.2%
American Indian and Alaska Native	15	0.3%
Asian	16	0.4%
Native Hawaiian and Other Pacific Islander	1	0.0%
Some other race	292	6.5%
Two or more races	346	7.7%
Hispanic or Latino (of any race)	667	14.9%

Demographic estimates

The average household size was 2.0 and the average family size was 2.6. The percent of those with a bachelor's degree or higher was estimated to be 12.8% of the population.

Income and poverty

The 2016–2020 5-year American Community Survey estimates show that the median household income was $56,024 (with a margin of error of +/- $5,811) and the median family income was $64,009 (+/- $5,089). Males had a median income of $37,708 (+/- $13,152) versus $23,750 (+/- $10,551) for females. The median income for those above 16 years old was $29,477 (+/- $3,863). Approximately, 4.8% of families and 7.0% of the population were below the poverty line, including 8.4% of those under the age of 18 and 3.3% of those ages 65 or over.

=== 2010 census ===
As of the census of 2010, there were 4,489 people, 1,985 households, and 1,161 families residing in the city. The population density was 1,029.6 inhabitants per square mile (397.5/km^{2}). There were 2,395 housing units at an average density of 549.3 per square mile (212.1/km^{2}). The racial makeup of the city was 93.0% White, 0.7% African American, 0.4% Native American, 0.4% Asian, 0.1% Pacific Islander, 3.3% from other races, and 2.1% from two or more races. Hispanic or Latino of any race were 11.0% of the population.

There were 1,985 households, of which 27.6% had children under the age of 18 living with them, 44.2% were married couples living together, 10.0% had a female householder with no husband present, 4.3% had a male householder with no wife present, and 41.5% were non-families. 36.0% of all households were made up of individuals, and 15.5% had someone living alone who was 65 years of age or older. The average household size was 2.21 and the average family size was 2.85.

The median age in the city was 40 years. 22.7% of residents were under the age of 18; 10.1% were between the ages of 18 and 24; 22.2% were from 25 to 44; 25.9% were from 45 to 64; and 19% were 65 years of age or older. The gender makeup of the city was 49.3% male and 50.7% female.

== Government ==
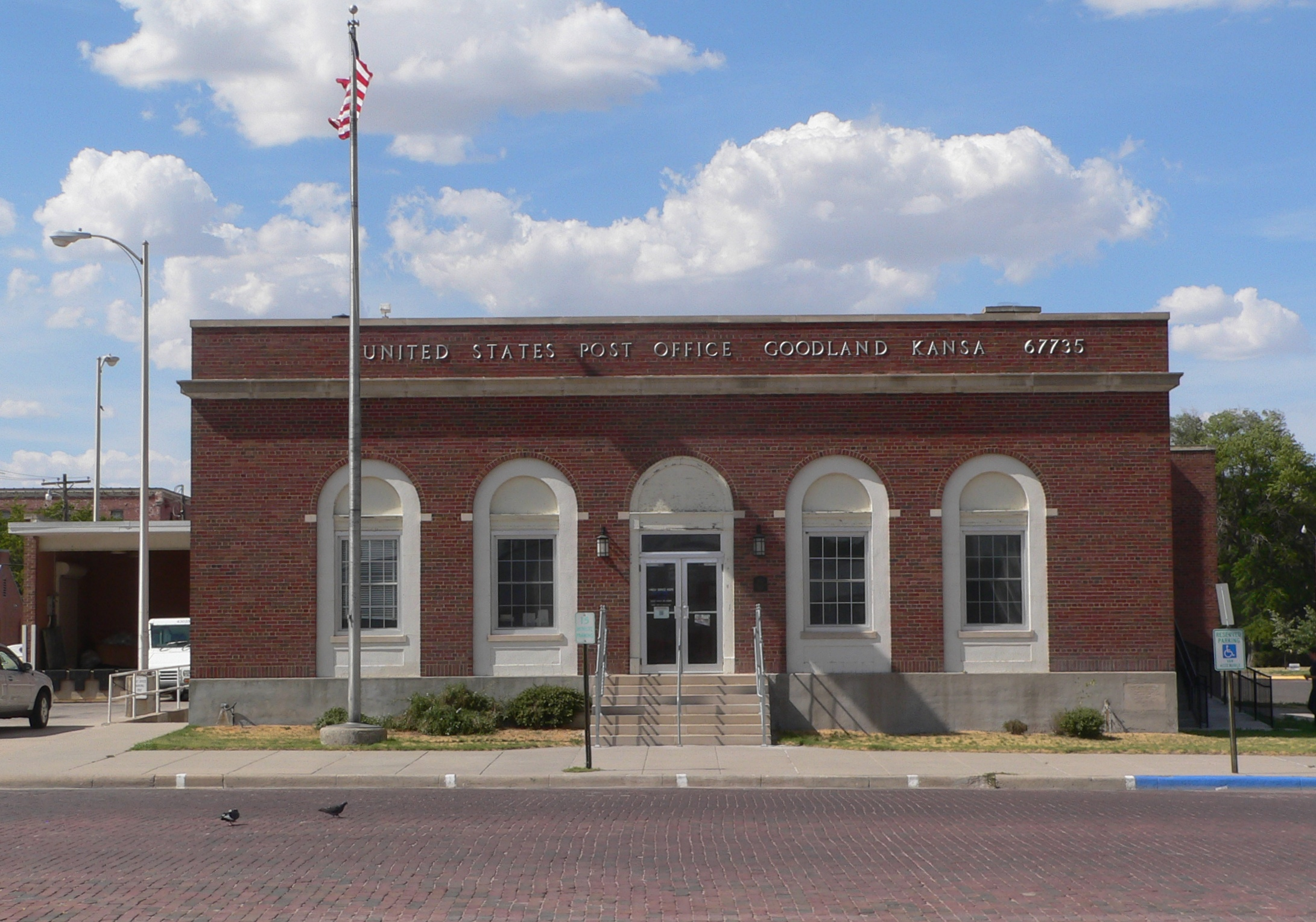
Post Office in Goodland (2012)

Goodland utilizes a council-manager style of government. Five commissioners are elected at large. A mayor is elected from among the commission to serve ceremonial purposes and chair the commission meetings. The commission is responsible for appointing a city manager, who handles the day-to-day operations of the city.

Goodland has a full-time police department that provides 24/7 law enforcement coverage within the city limits.

The city also boasts its own power plant, which ensures that citizens can access electricity even if outside power sources become unavailable.

The National Weather Service maintains a full-featured Weather Forecast Office in Goodland with doppler radar and a 19 County Warning Area (CWA) including three counties in eastern Colorado, three counties in southwest Nebraska and 13 counties in northwest Kansas. Aviation forecasts are created for two sites: Goodland, Kansas, and McCook, Nebraska. The office also has a fire weather and hydrologic program. The surface observation program is limited to the supplemental climatological observations. The office supports approximately 75 observers in the cooperative observer program. The office employs 22 people.

== Education ==
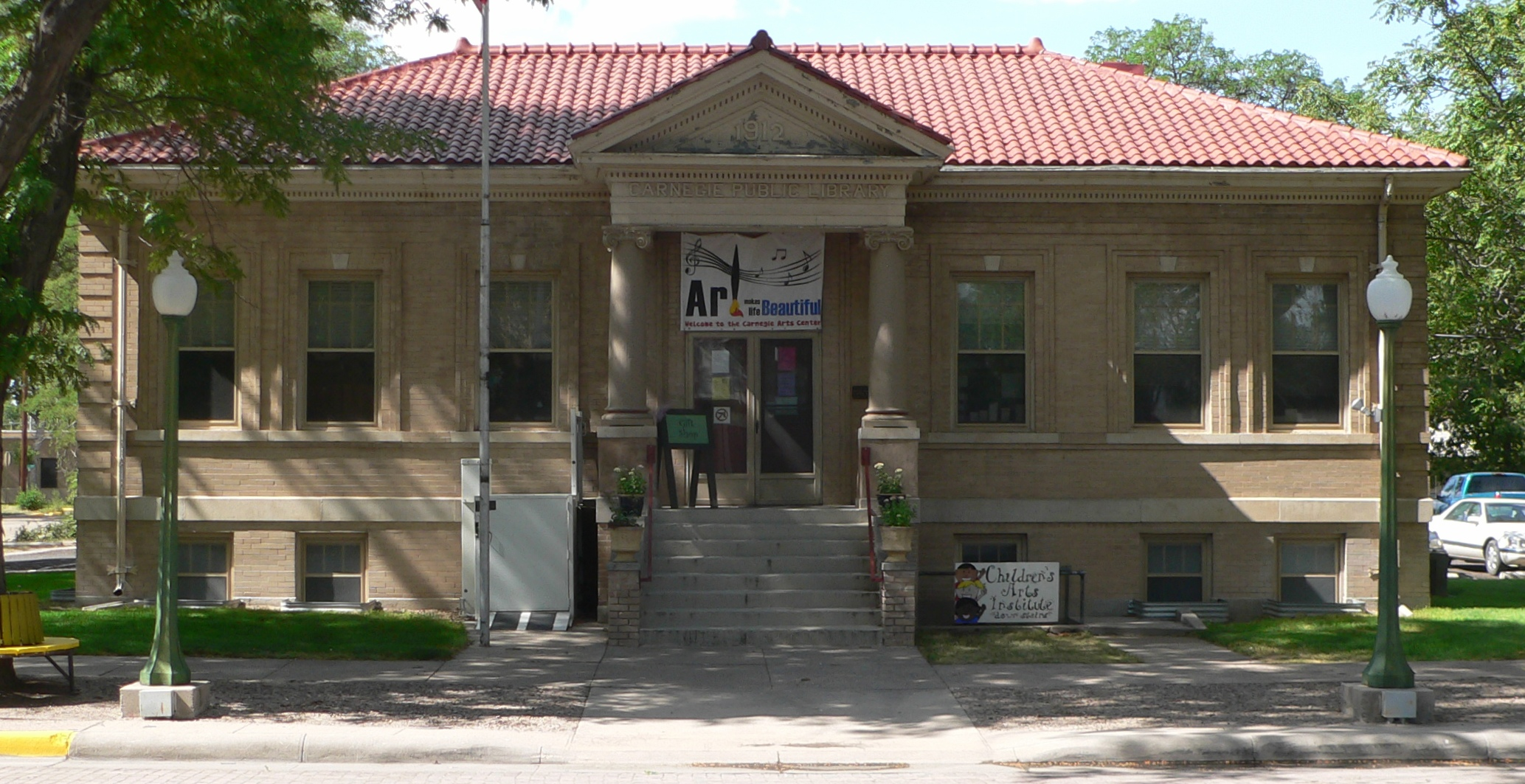
Former Goodland Carnegie Library, now Carnegie Arts Center (2012)

=== Primary and secondary education ===
The community is served by Goodland USD 352 public school district, which operates three public schools in the city:

- West Elementary School (Grades from pre-kindergarten to 2)
- North School (3–6)
- Goodland Junior Senior High School (7–12)

=== Colleges and universities ===
- Fort Hays Tech Northwest

== Media ==
The Goodland Star-News is the city's sole newspaper, published twice weekly. Four radio stations are licensed to and/or broadcast from Goodland. KLOE broadcasts a full service News/Talk format on 730 AM. KKCI plays a Classic Rock format, broadcasting on 102.5 FM. KWGB, which is licensed to Colby, Kansas, broadcasts from Goodland on 97.9 FM, playing a Country format. Licensed to Goodland, KGCR broadcasts on 107.7 FM from near Brewster, Kansas, playing a Christian Contemporary format.

Goodland is in the Wichita-Hutchinson, Kansas television market. CBS affiliate KBSL-DT, a satellite station of KWCH-DT in Wichita, is licensed to Goodland and broadcasts on digital channel 10.

Due to Goodland and the rest of Sherman County observing Mountain time, prime-time television programming airs from 6 to 9 p.m., instead of 7 to 10 as is normal in the Central time zone.

== Culture ==
=== Attractions ===
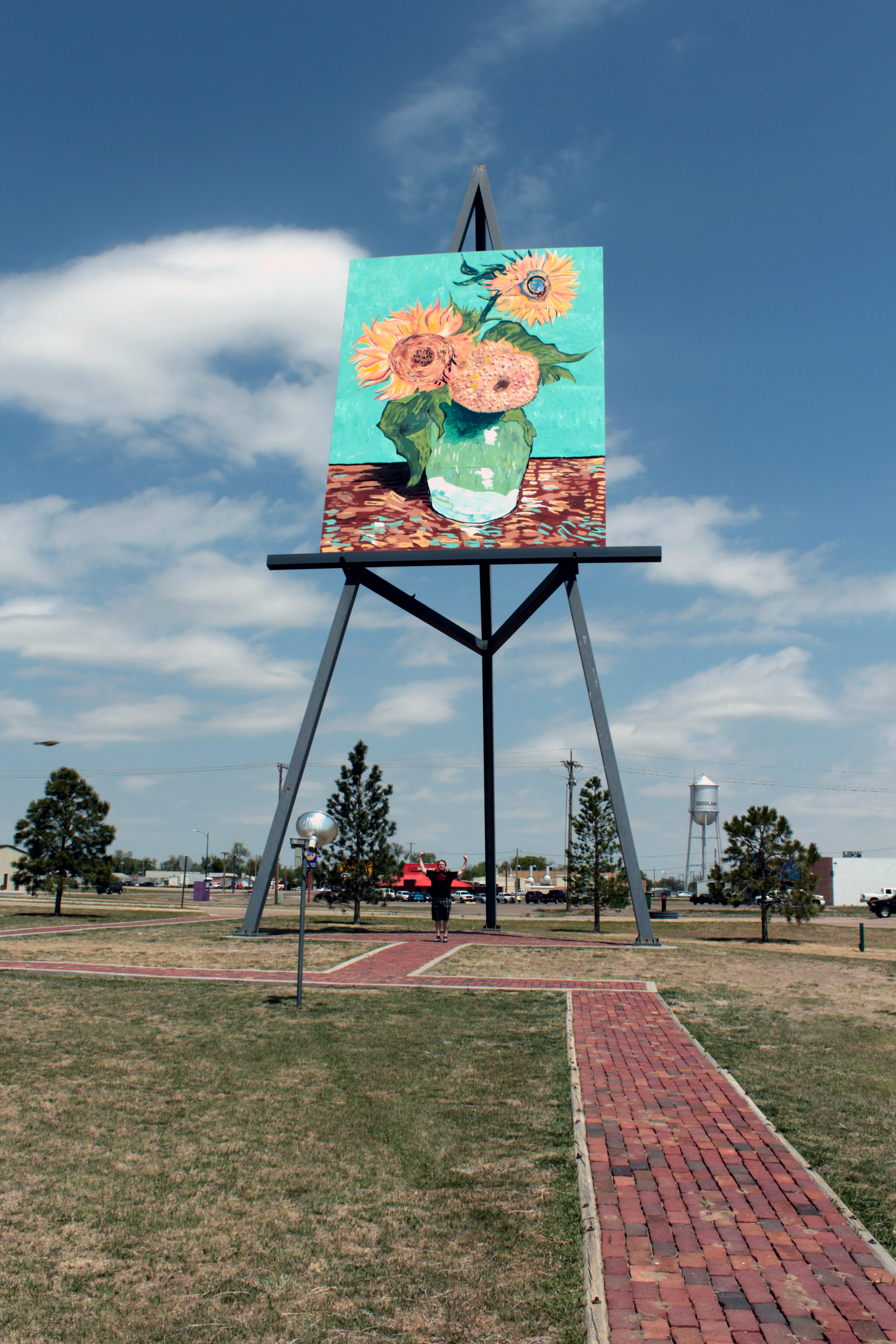
Oversized reproduction of van Gogh's Sunflowers (2014)

An 80-foot high steel easel holding a 24 foot by 32 foot reproduction of Vincent van Gogh's painting 3 Sunflowers in a Vase was erected in 2001 by artist Cameron Cross. After the installation suffered damage from exposure to the weather, Cross returned in 2012 to repaint the piece using a brighter palette.

The High Plains Museum includes a replica of the "gyrocopter", a commercially unsuccessful powered helicopter built in Goodland. After the company formed to build the machine disbanded, it was awarded a patent in 1912, believed to be the first United States patent for a rotary-winged aircraft.

=== In popular culture ===
- In L.E. Howel's novel, Planetfall, Goodland is the hometown of astronaut Karla Dawson and is a featured location in the story.
- In T.D. Shields' novels, "Into Shadow" and "Into Light," Goodland is the site of the new national capital after Washington D.C. (among many other cities) is destroyed by war and climate change.
- "Goodland" (2014) directed by Josh Doke is set in a fictional rendering of the town and is shot primarily in and around the City of Goodland.
- "Lost in Goodland: A Memoir of Childhood Chaos" (2026) by Jeremy Mills recounts his childhood in Goodland, Kansas during the early 2000s, including experiences with family instability and addiction.

== Transportation ==
Greyhound Lines provides intercity bus service via Goodland to St. Louis and Denver.

== Notable people ==
Notable individuals who were born in and/or have lived in Goodland include:

- Milo Baughman (1923–2003), furniture designer
- Brook Berringer (1973–1996), football quarterback for Nebraska
- John Delehant (1890–1972), U.S. federal judge
- Harry Felt (1902–1992), U.S. Navy Admiral
- Mike Friede (1957- ), football wide receiver
- Dave Jones (1947– ), football wide receiver
- Tinker Keck (1976– ), actor and former member of the New York Giants and in college he played for the University of Cincinnati
- Marla Luckert (1955– ), Kansas Supreme Court justice
- Charles Sparks (1872–1937), U.S. Representative from Kansas
- Deanell Tacha (1946– ), U.S. federal judge

== See also ==
- AN/URC-117 Ground Wave Emergency Network
