= KATR-FM =

- Otis, Colorado; United States
- Broadcast area: Sterling, Colorado
- Frequency: 98.3 MHz
- Branding: Kat Country 98.3

Programming
- Format: Country
- Affiliations: Citadel Media

Ownership
- Owner: Media Logic, LLC
- Sister stations: KFTM, KRDZ

History
- First air date: 1983
- Former call signs: KRQZ-FM (1982–1987); KRDZ-FM (1987–1988)
- Call sign meaning: "Cat"

Technical information
- Licensing authority: FCC
- Facility ID: 48397
- Class: C1
- ERP: 100,000 watts
- HAAT: 169 meters (554 ft)
- Transmitter coordinates: 40°25′13″N 102°58′10″W

Links
- Public license information: Public file; LMS
- Website: katcountry983.com

KATR-FM (98.3 FM, "Kat Country 98.3") is a radio station licensed to serve Otis, Colorado, United States. The station, which began broadcasting in 1983, is currently owned by Media Logic, LLC.

== Programming ==
KATR-FM broadcasts a country music format to the greater Sterling, Colorado, area. The station also airs ABC News updates at the top of every hour, frequent "Ag Network Market Update" reports, and The Huckabee Report.

== History ==
This station received its original construction permit from the Federal Communications Commission on May 26, 1982. The new station was assigned the KRQZ-FM call sign by the FCC on September 7, 1982.

In October 1982, KRDZ Broadcasters, Inc., reached an agreement to sell this still-under construction station to J-Bar-T Broadcasting Company, Inc. The deal was approved by the FCC on December 14, 1982, and the transaction was consummated on January 20, 1983. KRQZ-FM received its license to cover from the FCC on April 26, 1984.

Facing financial difficulties, J-Bar-T Broadcasting Company, Inc., went into receivership and an application was filed to involuntarily transfer the license to Frank Duke, receiver. The deal was approved by the FCC on April 21, 1986. In August 1987, Frank Duke reached an agreement to sell this station to WRAY Radio, Inc. The deal was approved by the FCC on September 22, 1987, and the transaction was consummated on September 25, 1987. On October 7, 1987, the new owners had the station's call sign changed to KRDZ-FM. Just over a year later, on November 20, 1988, the call sign was changed again, this time to KATR-FM.

WRAY Radio, Inc., announced an agreement in July 1990 to sell KATR-FM to New Directions Media, Inc. The deal was approved by the FCC on July 25, 1990, and the transaction was consummated on August 1, 1990.

New Directions Media, Inc., announced in August 2002 that they had agreed to sell this station to Media Logic, LLC. The deal was approved by the FCC on October 28, 2002, and the transaction was consummated on October 31, 2002.

== Awards and honors ==
The station's official website, katcountry983.com, won the Best Small Market Website honor for 2008 from the Colorado Broadcasters Association. The CBA awarded KATR-FM the runner-up certificate for Best On Air Contest for a Station to honor their 2007 "Kat Country Ugly Truck" promotion. That contest features an old pickup truck, refurbished by the station, and given away to a lucky listener.
