= KSPK-FM =

- Walsenburg, Colorado; United States
- Broadcast area: Colorado Springs, Colorado; Pueblo, Colorado; Alamosa, Colorado; Trinidad, Colorado
- Frequency: 102.3 MHz
- Branding: Best Country

Programming
- Format: Country
- Affiliations: ABC News Radio

Ownership
- Owner: Mainstreet Broadcasting Company, Inc
- Sister stations: KSPK-LD, KSBK

History
- Former call signs: KSPK (1984–2012)

Technical information
- Licensing authority: FCC
- Facility ID: 39677
- Class: C1
- ERP: 100,000 watts
- HAAT: 131.0 meters (429.8 ft)
- Transmitter coordinates: 37°37′39″N 104°49′17″W
- Translators: 100.3 K262AQ (Del Norte); 101.7 K269GQ (Raton, New Mexico); 104.1 K281BC (Alamosa); 104.1 K281BI (Trinidad); 104.1 K281CU (Del Norte)
- Repeater: 100.3 KSBK (Blanca)

Links
- Public license information: Public file; LMS
- Webcast: Listen live
- Website: kspk.com

KSPK-FM (102.3 FM) is a radio station broadcasting a Country format. Licensed to Walsenburg, Colorado, United States, the station is currently owned by Mainstreet Broadcasting Company, Inc. and features its own programming. KSPK-FM is not affiliated with any mainstream broadcasting company, and touts itself as being one of the few locally owned and operated radio stations left in Southern Colorado.

In addition to the main station, KSPK-FM is simulcast on KSBK 100.3FM in Alamosa and is carried on five translators:

- K281CU 104.1 FM Del Norte, Colorado
- K281BI 104.1 FM Trinidad, Colorado
- K281BC 104.1 FM Alamosa, Colorado
- K262AQ 100.3 FM Colorado Springs, Colorado
- K269GQ 101.7 FM Raton, New Mexico
