= KSIR =

Radio station in Brush, Colorado

- Brush, Colorado; United States
- Broadcast area: Fort Morgan, Colorado
- Frequency: 1010 kHz
- Branding: Farm Radio

Programming
- Format: Talk radio
- Affiliations: ABC News Radio; Denver Broncos; Denver Nuggets; Colorado Rockies; Colorado Avalanche

Ownership
- Owner: Northeast Colorado Broadcasting LLC
- Sister stations: KPRB

History
- First air date: August 1977
- Former call signs: KKGZ (1985–1993)

Technical information
- Licensing authority: FCC
- Facility ID: 48396
- Class: B
- Power: 25,000 watts (day); 280 watts (night)
- Transmitter coordinates: 40°18′49.9″N 103°35′31.8″W
- Translators: 92.9 K225CF (Sterling); 93.7 K226DA (Yuma)

Links
- Public license information: Public file; LMS
- Webcast: Listen live
- Website: ksir.com

KSIR (1010 AM) is a radio station broadcasting a talk radio format. Licensed to Brush, Colorado, United States, the station is currently owned by Northeast Colorado Broadcasting LLC and features programming from ABC News Radio.

== History ==
The station was assigned the call letters KKGZ on August 22, 1985. The current call letters were used in Denver, Colorado from 1991 to 1993, then the call letters came here. On April 26, 1993, the station changed its call sign to the current KSIR.
