= KVRH-FM =

- Salida, Colorado; United States
- Broadcast area: Buena Vista, Colorado
- Frequency: 92.3 MHz
- Branding: The Peak

Programming
- Format: Hot adult contemporary

Ownership
- Owner: Three Eagles Communications of Colorado, LLC

History
- First air date: 1971

Technical information
- Licensing authority: FCC
- Facility ID: 1020
- Class: C3
- ERP: 220 watts
- HAAT: 895.4 meters (2,938 ft)
- Transmitter coordinates: 38°27′11″N 106°1′2″W

Links
- Public license information: Public file; LMS
- Webcast: Listen live
- Website: thepeak923.com

KVRH-FM (92.3 FM) is a radio station broadcasting a hot adult contemporary format. Licensed to Salida, Colorado, United States, the station is currently owned by Three Eagles Communications of Colorado, LLC.
