= KSTC (AM) =

- Sterling, Colorado; United States
- Frequency: 1230 kHz
- Branding: Fox Sports 1230 AM KSTC

Programming
- Format: Sports
- Affiliations: Fox Sports Radio

Ownership
- Owner: Wayne Johnson; (Media Logic LLC)
- Sister stations: KNNG

History
- First air date: 1938 (as KGEK)
- Former call signs: KGEK (1938–1977)
- Call sign meaning: Sterling, Colorado

Technical information
- Licensing authority: FCC
- Facility ID: 35639
- Class: C
- Power: 1,000 watts
- Transmitter coordinates: 40.617777°N 103.1752°W
- Translator: 102.5 K273DC (Sterling)

Links
- Public license information: Public file; LMS
- Webcast: Listen Live
- Website: 1230kstc.com

KSTC (1230 AM, "Fox Sports 1230 AM KSTC") is a radio station broadcasting a sports format. Licensed to the city of Sterling, Colorado, it serves the northeastern Colorado area. It first began broadcasting in 1938 under the call sign KGEK. The station is currently owned by Wayne Johnson, through licensee Media Logic LLC.

== History ==
The radio station was founded in 1938 by Harry Behler and was first licensed as KGEK in Yuma, Colorado, about 60 miles southeast of Sterling. In the 1950s it was moved to Sterling. For the next 30 years the station occupied an adobe building and, later, double-wide mobile home at the east edge of Sterling.

The station went through a series of ownership transfers during that time, In 1974 an FM station was added (104.5 MHz), with call letters KYOT ("Country Coyote") and in the late 1970s the stations' call letters were changed to KSTC and KNNG-FM.

The station was moved into a new facility on West Main Street in Sterling in 1983, and remains at that location.

Over the years, KGEK/KSTC has had a number of music and programming formats. In the late 1960s and early 1970s the station experimented with a multi-format concept, playing "easy listening" music in the mornings, country music in the afternoon and rock/pop in the evenings. At present, KSTC airs sports from Fox Sports Radio, while KNNG-FM plays crossover country music.

On March 13, 2017 KSTC changed their format from oldies to sports, branded as "Fox Sports 1230 AM KSTC". (info taken from stationintel.com)
