= KFTM =

- Fort Morgan, Colorado; United States
- Broadcast area: Fort Morgan, Colorado
- Frequency: 1400 kHz
- Branding: Hometown Radio 1400

Programming
- Format: Classic hits
- Affiliations: Fox News Radio

Ownership
- Owner: Media Logic, LLC

History
- First air date: 1949

Technical information
- Licensing authority: FCC
- Facility ID: 38636
- Class: C
- Power: 1,000 watts unlimited
- Transmitter coordinates: 40°15′31″N 103°51′7″W
- Translator: 94.1 K231DB (Fort Morgan)

Links
- Public license information: Public file; LMS
- Webcast: Listen Live
- Website: kftm.net

KFTM (1400 AM, "Hometown Radio 1400") is a radio station broadcasting a classic hits format. Licensed to Fort Morgan, Colorado, United States, the station is currently owned by Media Logic, LLC and features local programming and information from Fox News Radio.

Previous logo
