= Colby, Kansas =

City in Thomas County, Kansas

- City and County seat
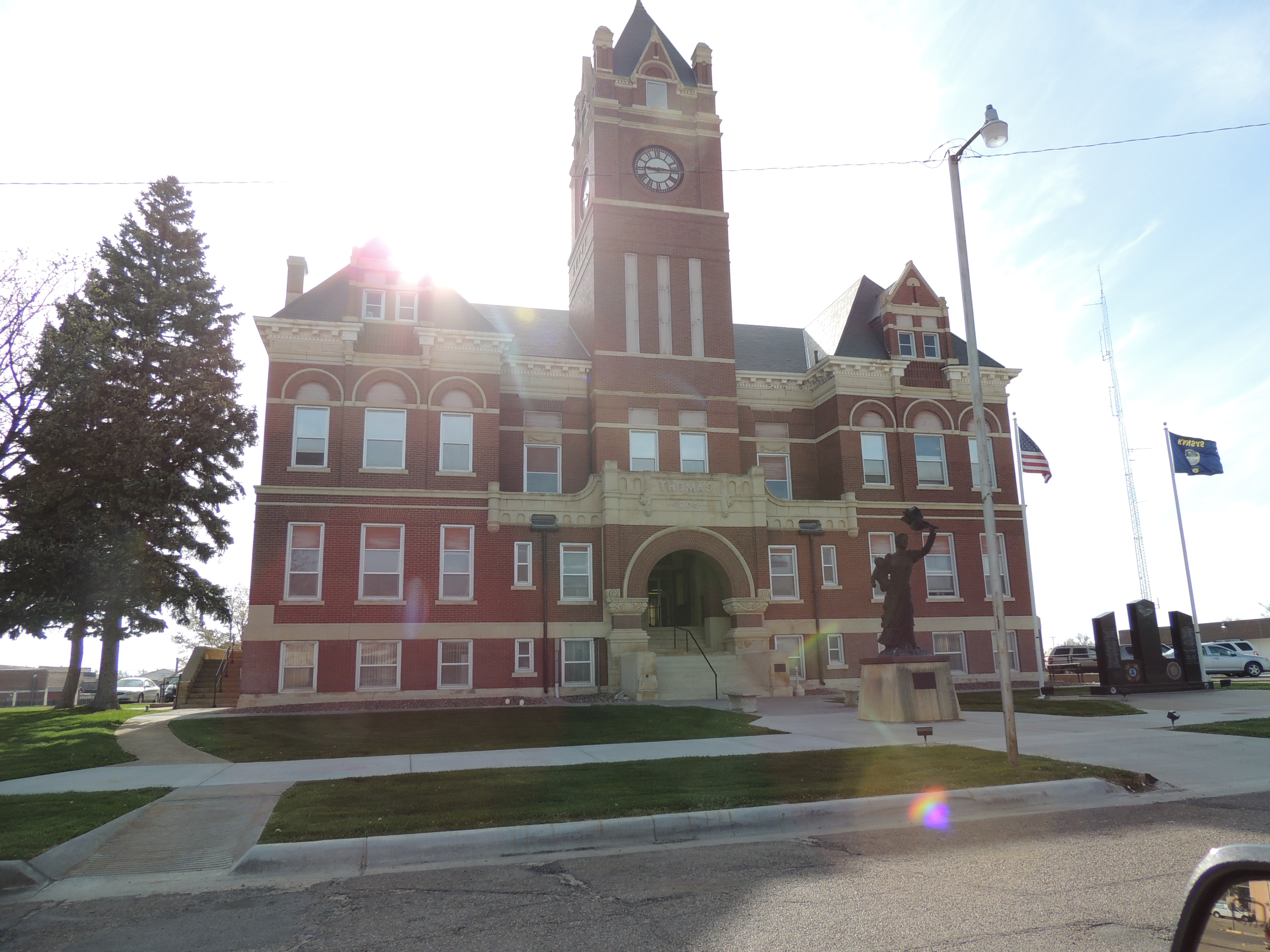
- Thomas County Courthouse (2014)

- Location within Thomas County and Kansas

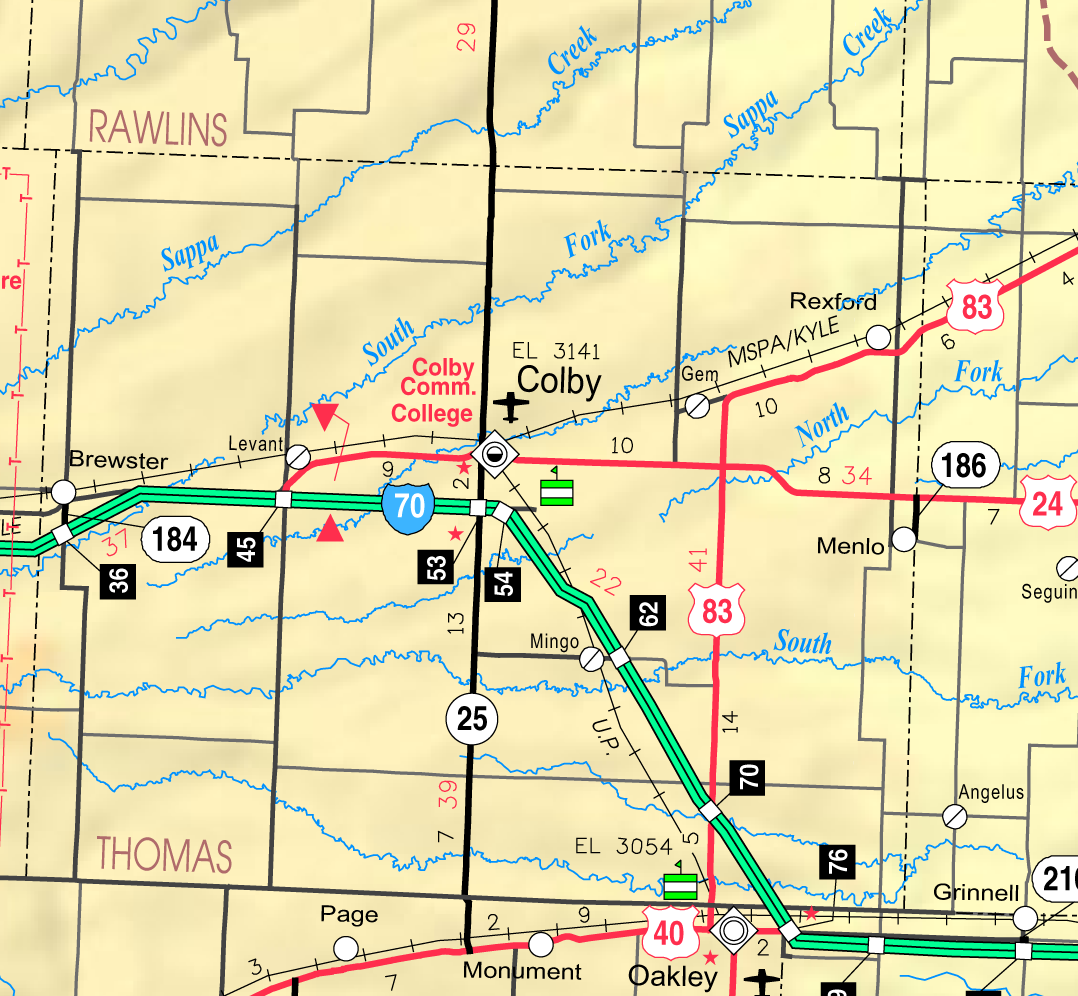
- KDOT map of Thomas County (legend)
- Coordinates: 39°23′05″N 101°02′43″W
- Country: United States
- State: Kansas
- County: Thomas
- Founded: 1885
- Incorporated: 1886
- Named for: J.R. Colby

Area
  - Total: 3.58 sq mi (9.27 km^{2})
  - Land: 3.58 sq mi (9.27 km^{2})
  - Water: 0 sq mi (0.00 km^{2})
- Elevation: 3,166 ft (965 m)

Population (2020)
  - Total: 5,570
  - Density: 1,560/sq mi (601/km^{2})
- Time zone: UTC-6 (CST)
  - Summer (DST): UTC-5 (CDT)
- ZIP Code: 67701
- Area code: 785
- FIPS code: 20-14650
- GNIS ID: 485557
- Website: cityofcolbyks.gov

Colby is a city in and the county seat of Thomas County, Kansas, United States. As of the 2020 census, the population of the city was 5,570. It is located on the north side of Interstate 70.

== History ==
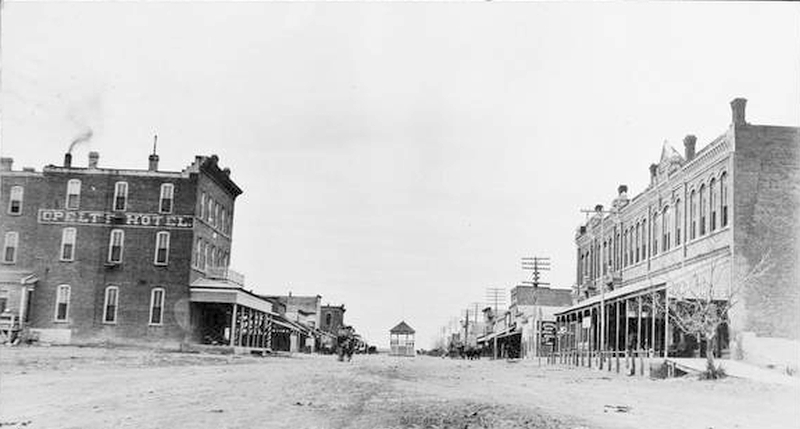
Colby, 1910

In 1882, a post office was established near the center of Thomas County. Area homesteaders lived under harsh conditions in sod houses, creating demand for a town to provide lumber and other provisions to incoming settlers. J.R. Colby, a local land assessor and preacher, obtained a patent to establish the town in April 1884, and land was acquired for the town site three miles north of the post office in March 1885. The following month, the Kansas Secretary of State issued the Town Charter. Kansas Gov. John Martin named Colby the county seat in 1885, and the city was incorporated in 1886. The Union Pacific Railroad reached the city in 1887, and the Rock Island Railroad followed the next year.

In 1941 the St. Thomas Hospital was built as part of the Works Progress Administration plan to build hospitals. This was one of 130 new hospitals to be built with these funds, it was one of two built in Kansas alone. Within the last couple of years, it was renovated to apartments under the name St. Thomas Historic Residences.

Interstate 70 reached Colby in 1965, stimulating the growth of a local hospitality industry.

== Geography ==
Colby lies on the south side of Prairie Dog Creek, a tributary of the Republican River, in the High Plains region of the Great Plains. A small tributary of the creek flows northeast through the town. Located at the interchange of Interstate 70 and K-25 in northwestern Kansas, Colby is 212 mi (341 km) east-southeast of Denver, 232 mi (373 km) northwest of Wichita, and 347 mi (558 km) west of Kansas City.

According to the United States Census Bureau, the city has a total area of 3.38 square miles (8.75 km^{2}), all land.

=== Climate ===
Colby has a transitional climate between a humid continental climate (Köppen Dfa) and a semiarid climate (Köppen BSk) with hot summers and cold, dry winters. The hottest temperature recorded in Colby was 113 °F (45.0 °C) on July 25, 1940, and 28 June 2012, while the coldest temperature recorded was −32 °F (−35.6 °C) on December 22, 1989.

Climate data for Colby, Kansas, 1991–2020 normals, extremes 1893–present
Month	Jan	Feb	Mar	Apr	May	Jun	Jul	Aug	Sep	Oct	Nov	Dec	Year
Record high °F (°C)	83 (28)	85 (29)	94 (34)	98 (37)	103 (39)	113 (45)	113 (45)	110 (43)	108 (42)	97 (36)	91 (33)	83 (28)	113 (45)
Mean maximum °F (°C)	67.0 (19.4)	71.4 (21.9)	81.8 (27.7)	87.7 (30.9)	94.2 (34.6)	101.4 (38.6)	102.8 (39.3)	100.6 (38.1)	97.3 (36.3)	91.1 (32.8)	77.6 (25.3)	67.7 (19.8)	104.4 (40.2)
Mean daily maximum °F (°C)	43.0 (6.1)	45.7 (7.6)	56.2 (13.4)	64.7 (18.2)	74.3 (23.5)	86.4 (30.2)	91.0 (32.8)	88.4 (31.3)	81.3 (27.4)	68.3 (20.2)	54.3 (12.4)	44.1 (6.7)	66.5 (19.2)
Daily mean °F (°C)	29.0 (−1.7)	31.6 (−0.2)	40.8 (4.9)	49.5 (9.7)	60.1 (15.6)	71.8 (22.1)	76.7 (24.8)	74.1 (23.4)	65.8 (18.8)	52.2 (11.2)	39.5 (4.2)	30.2 (−1.0)	51.8 (11.0)
Mean daily minimum °F (°C)	15.1 (−9.4)	17.4 (−8.1)	25.5 (−3.6)	34.4 (1.3)	45.9 (7.7)	57.2 (14.0)	62.3 (16.8)	59.8 (15.4)	50.3 (10.2)	36.2 (2.3)	24.7 (−4.1)	16.4 (−8.7)	37.1 (2.8)
Mean minimum °F (°C)	−3.8 (−19.9)	−0.7 (−18.2)	6.8 (−14.0)	18.5 (−7.5)	30.3 (−0.9)	43.5 (6.4)	51.8 (11.0)	49.6 (9.8)	35.4 (1.9)	19.7 (−6.8)	7.7 (−13.5)	−2.3 (−19.1)	−9.4 (−23.0)
Record low °F (°C)	−28 (−33)	−31 (−35)	−22 (−30)	−1 (−18)	17 (−8)	33 (1)	38 (3)	39 (4)	21 (−6)	1 (−17)	−11 (−24)	−32 (−36)	−32 (−36)
Average precipitation inches (mm)	0.41 (10)	0.56 (14)	0.92 (23)	1.97 (50)	2.92 (74)	2.62 (67)	3.81 (97)	3.04 (77)	1.44 (37)	1.56 (40)	0.63 (16)	0.51 (13)	20.39 (518)
Average snowfall inches (cm)	5.1 (13)	5.8 (15)	4.2 (11)	2.2 (5.6)	0.7 (1.8)	0.0 (0.0)	0.0 (0.0)	0.0 (0.0)	0.2 (0.51)	1.6 (4.1)	3.5 (8.9)	3.9 (9.9)	27.2 (69.81)
Average precipitation days (≥ 0.01 in)	3.0	4.1	4.9	6.8	10.3	8.6	9.3	8.3	5.5	5.8	3.7	3.2	73.5
Average snowy days (≥ 0.1 in)	2.7	3.3	2.1	1.2	0.1	0.0	0.0	0.0	0.0	0.7	1.9	2.6	14.6
Source: NOAA

== Demographics ==
Historical population
Census	Pop.	Note	%±
1890	516		—
1900	641		24.2%
1910	1,130		76.3%
1920	1,114		−1.4%
1930	2,153		93.3%
1940	2,458		14.2%
1950	3,859		57.0%
1960	4,210		9.1%
1970	4,658		10.6%
1980	5,544		19.0%
1990	5,396		−2.7%
2000	5,450		1.0%
2010	5,387		−1.2%
2020	5,570		3.4%
2023 (est.)	5,589		0.3%
U.S. Decennial Census; 2010-2020

=== 2020 census ===
As of the 2020 census, Colby had a population of 5,570 in 2,199 households, including 1,331 families. The population density was 1,555.4 per square mile (600.6/km^{2}). There were 2,496 housing units at an average density of 697.0 per square mile (269.1/km^{2}).

The median age was 34.6 years. 23.4% of residents were under the age of 18, 13.8% were from 18 to 24, 24.4% were from 25 to 44, 21.7% were from 45 to 64, and 16.7% were 65 years of age or older. For every 100 females there were 92.2 males, and for every 100 females age 18 and over there were 88.2 males age 18 and over.

Of the 2,199 households, 29.7% had children under the age of 18 living in them. Of all households, 45.5% were married-couple households, 20.0% were households with a male householder and no spouse or partner present, and 27.8% were households with a female householder and no spouse or partner present. About 32.9% of all households were made up of individuals and 12.2% had someone living alone who was 65 years of age or older. The average household size was 2.2 and the average family size was 2.7.

96.9% of residents lived in urban areas, while 3.1% lived in rural areas. There were 2,496 housing units, of which 11.9% were vacant; the homeowner vacancy rate was 2.0% and the rental vacancy rate was 16.1%.

Racial composition as of the 2020 census
Race	Number	Percent
White	4,942	88.7%
Black or African American	98	1.8%
American Indian and Alaska Native	44	0.8%
Asian	34	0.6%
Native Hawaiian and Other Pacific Islander	0	0.0%
Some other race	133	2.4%
Two or more races	319	5.7%
Hispanic or Latino (of any race)	452	8.1%

White alone, not Hispanic or Latino, made up 86.3% of the population.

Demographic estimates

The percent of those with a bachelor's degree or higher was estimated to be 14.2% of the population.

The 2016–2020 5-year American Community Survey estimates show that the median household income was $62,001 (with a margin of error of +/- $7,250) and the median family income was $74,980 (+/- $13,070). Males had a median income of $45,696 (+/- $10,972) versus $28,368 (+/- $5,092) for females. The median income for those above 16 years old was $32,780 (+/- $3,641). Approximately, 6.3% of families and 7.2% of the population were below the poverty line, including 1.4% of those under the age of 18 and 10.3% of those ages 65 or over.

=== 2010 census ===
As of the census of 2010, there were 5,387 people, 2,211 households, and 1,320 families residing in the city. The population density was 1,593.8 inhabitants per square mile (615.4/km^{2}). There were 2,423 housing units at an average density of 716.9 per square mile (276.8/km^{2}). The racial makeup of the city was 95.7% White, 0.7% African American, 0.4% Native American, 0.6% Asian, 0.1% Pacific Islander, 1.3% from other races, and 1.2% from two or more races. Hispanic or Latino of any race were 4.0% of the population.

There were 2,211 households, of which 28.6% had children under the age of 18 living with them, 46.0% were married couples living together, 9.2% had a female householder with no husband present, 4.5% had a male householder with no wife present, and 40.3% were non-families. 33.2% of all households were made up of individuals, and 12.2% had someone living alone who was 65 years of age or older. The average household size was 2.28 and the average family size was 2.89.

The median age in the city was 34.5 years. 22.2% of residents were under the age of 18; 16.3% were between the ages of 18 and 24; 21.5% were from 25 to 44; 24.2% were from 45 to 64; and 15.7% were 65 years of age or older. The gender makeup of the city was 48.0% male and 52.0% female.

== Arts and culture ==
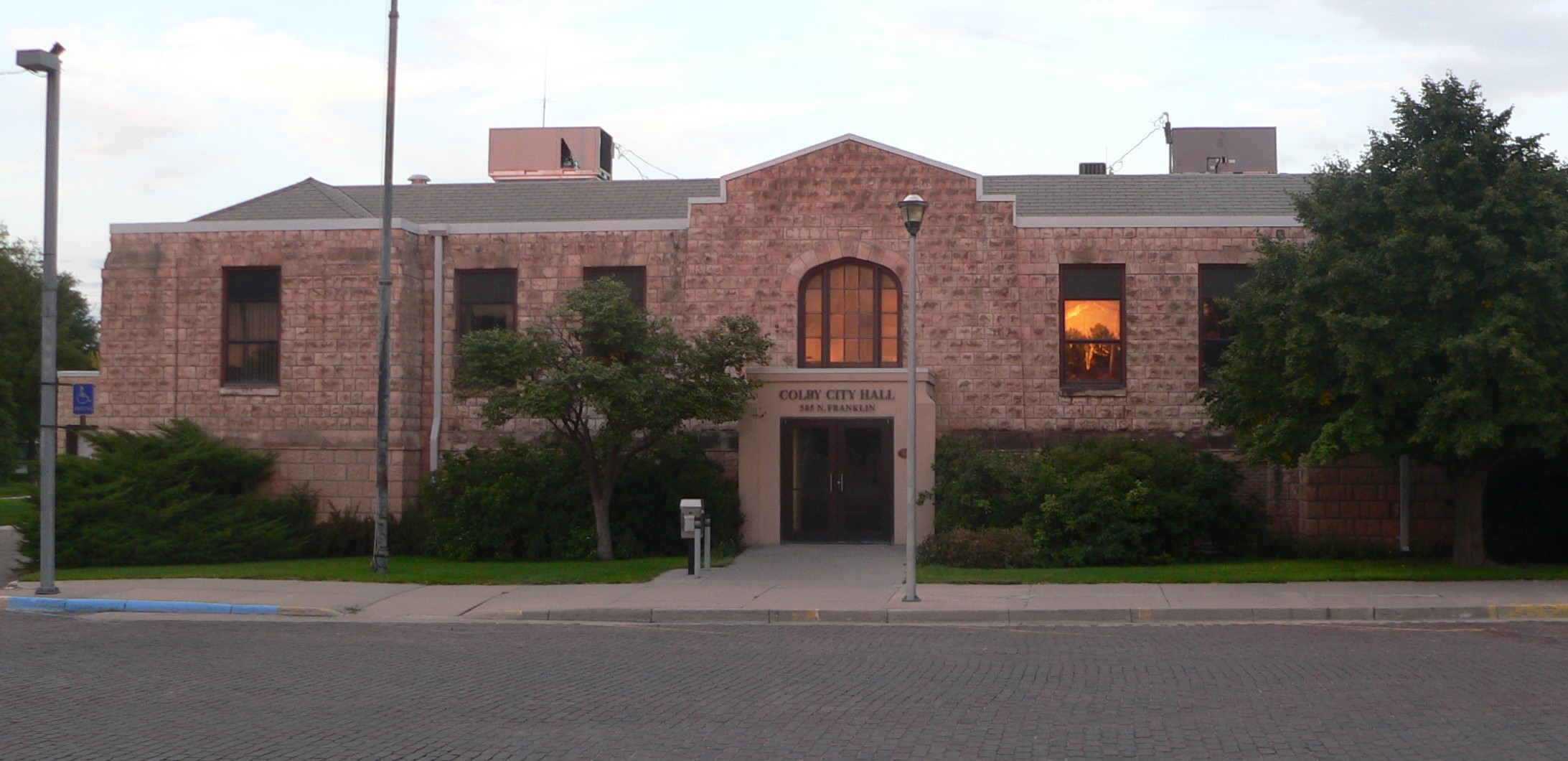
Colby City Hall

The Prairie Museum of Art and History is a 24-acre (97,000 m^{2}) private, nonprofit museum governed by the Thomas County Historical Society. The Cooper Barn located at the museum complex is known as the "Largest Barn in Kansas."

Sites listed on the National Register of Historic Places include Thomas County Courthouse (1907), Colby Community High School, and Colby City Hall (1920), an art-deco, sand-colored building that has served as a correctional facility, fire station, library and meeting hall.

Pioneer Memorial Library is named in honor of the pioneers who built the community.

== Parks and recreation ==
Villa High Lake is a city-made reservoir created in the 1960s by the Kansas Department of Wildlife and Parks. The park has playground equipment, picnic shelters, disc golf, and fishing.

Fike Park features gazebos, a volleyball area, horseshoe pitching pits, and tennis courts.

Colby Aquatic Park opened in 2012.

Colby Event Center opened in 2021 and features gyms, meeting rooms and an indoor playground. The Event Center hosts Colby High School and Colby Community College basketball and volleyball games.

== Government ==
Colby has a mayor-council form of government. Elected at-large, the mayor presides over the city council and has final approval over ordinances the council passes. The mayor shares responsibility for setting policy and approving the city budget with the council. With the council's consent, the mayor appoints all members of the city boards and, if necessary, serves as the tie-breaking vote on council business. The city council consists of eight members elected by ward every four years. The city manager is hired by the council and is responsible for preparing the budget, administering day-to-day operations, and managing city government personnel.

== Education ==
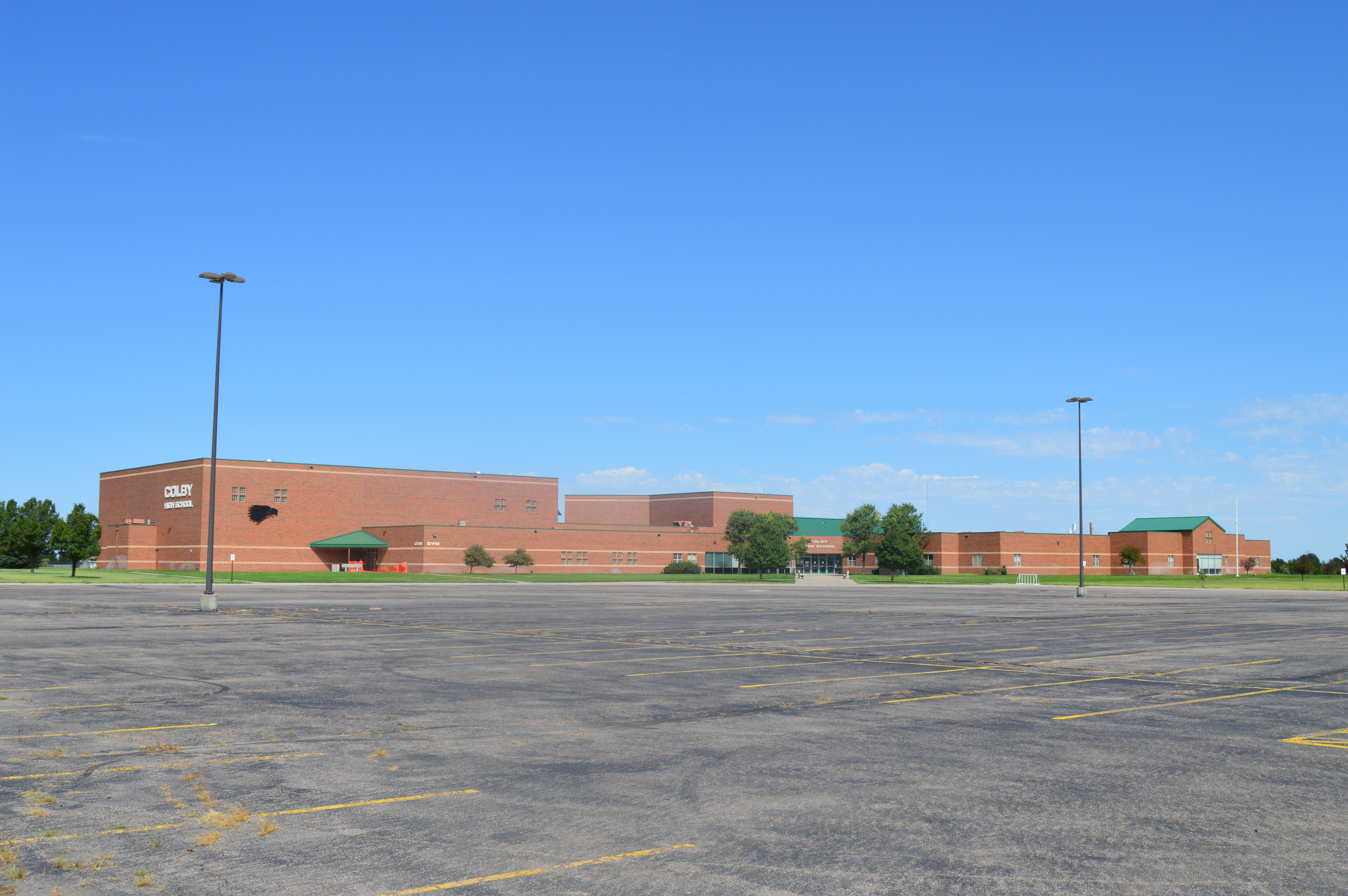
Colby High School

=== Colleges and universities ===
- Colby Community College

=== Primary and secondary education ===
The community is served by Colby USD 315 public school district, and operates four public schools in the city:

- Colby High School (9–12).
- Colby Middle School (5–8).
- Colby Grade School (Grades K–4).
- Thomas County Academy (5–9), charter school.

There are also two private schools in Colby:

- Sacred Heart Catholic School (Pre-K–5).
- Heartland Christian School (K–12).

== Media ==
The Colby Free Press is Colby's local newspaper, published four days a week. In addition, Colby Community College publishes a bi-weekly student newspaper, the Trojan Express.

Colby is a center of broadcast media for northwestern Kansas. One AM and four FM stations are licensed to and/or broadcast from the city. Colby is in the Wichita-Hutchinson television market, and two television stations broadcast from the city: KLBY, a satellite of the ABC affiliate in Wichita, and KWKS, a satellite of Smoky Hills Public Television in Bunker Hill, Kansas.

== Infrastructure ==
=== Transportation ===
Interstate 70 runs east–west, immediately south of Colby. U.S. Route 24 runs east–west through the city, intersecting K-25 which runs north–south.

Colby Municipal Airport is located on K-25, approximately two miles (3 km) north of the city.

Kyle Railroad operates rail via the former Rock Island Railroad, which runs east–west through Colby. A Union Pacific Railroad branch line ends in Colby, entering the city from the southeast.

== Notable people ==
- Mary Brooks (1907–2002), Director of the U.S. Mint
- John Connelly (1870–1940), U.S. Representative from Kansas
- Sheila Frahm (born 1945), U.S. Senator from Kansas, Lieutenant Governor of Kansas
- Mike Hayden (born 1944), 41st Governor of Kansas
- Zelma Henderson (1920–2008), school desegregation activist
- Wayne Munn (1896–1931), professional wrestler
- Samuel Ramey (born 1942), opera singer
- Mark Schultz (born 1970), Contemporary Christian singer/songwriter
- Ken Summers (born 1953), Colorado state legislator
- John Thomas (1874–1945), U.S. Senator from Idaho
- Carol Voisin (born 1947), Oregon politician
