= Smith Township, Kansas =

Township in Thomas County, Kansas, U.S.

Smith Township
- Township
- Location within Thomas County
- Coordinates: 39.430591°N 100.768149°W
- Country: United States
- State: Kansas
- County: Thomas

Government
  - Trustee: Ben Hoeting

Area
  - Total: 35.939 sq mi (93.08 km^{2})
  - Land: 35.927 sq mi (93.05 km^{2})
  - Water: 0.012 sq mi (0.031 km^{2}) 0.03%

Population (2020)
  - Total: 238
  - Density: 6.62/sq mi (2.56/km^{2})
- Time zone: UTC-6 (CST)
  - Summer (DST): UTC-5 (CDT)
- Area code: 785
- GNIS feature ID: 471209

Smith Township is a township in Thomas County, Kansas, United States. As of the 2020 census, its population was 238.

== Geography ==
Smith Township covers an area of 35.939 square miles (93.08 km^{2}), 0.03% of it water.

=== Communities ===
- Rexford

=== Adjacent townships ===
Wendell Township, Thomas County
		north	northeast	Prairie Dog Township, Sheridan County
Lacey Township, Thomas County	west	self	east	Bloomfield Township, Sheridan County
North Randall Township, Thomas County	southwest	south	southeast	Logan Township, Sheridan County
Menlo Township, Thomas County

== Transportation ==
=== Major highways ===
- US-83

== Demographics ==
As of the 2020 census, the township had a population of 238, giving a population density of 6.62 people per square mile (2.56 people/km^{2}). The racial makeup of the township was 76.5% White, 0.4% Native American, 0.4% Black or African American, 9.2% from some other race, and 13.4% from two or more races. Hispanics or Latinos of any race were 36.1% of the population.

The 2020–2024 American Community Survey estimated that the township contained 83 households and 109 housing units.
