= Lacey Township, Kansas =

Township in Thomas County, Kansas, U.S.

Lacey Township
- Township
- Location within Thomas County
- Coordinates: 39.437878°N 100.887293°W
- Country: United States
- State: Kansas
- County: Thomas

Government
  - Trustee: Jonathan Higerd

Area
  - Total: 35.579 sq mi (92.15 km^{2})
  - Land: 35.579 sq mi (92.15 km^{2})
  - Water: 0 sq mi (0 km^{2}) 0%

Population (2020)
  - Total: 138
  - Density: 3.88/sq mi (1.50/km^{2})
- Time zone: UTC-6 (CST)
  - Summer (DST): UTC-5 (CDT)
- Area code: 785
- GNIS feature ID: 471206

Lacey Township is a township in Thomas County, Kansas, United States. As of the 2020 census, its population was 138.

== Geography ==
Lacey Township covers an area of 35.579 square miles (92.15 km^{2}), all of it land.

=== Communities ===
- Gem

=== Adjacent townships ===
Wendell Township, Thomas County
Rovohl Township, Thomas County	northwest	north
		self	east	Smith Township, Thomas County
Morgan Township, Thomas County	southwest	south	southeast	Menlo Township, Thomas County
North Randall Township, Thomas County

== Transportation ==
=== Major highways ===
- US-24
- US-83

== Demographics ==
As of the 2020 census, the township had a population of 138, giving a population density of 3.88 people per square mile (1.50 people/km^{2}). The racial makeup of the township was 87.0% White, 2.2% Asian, 0.7% Black or African American, 2.2% from some other race, and 8.0% from two or more races. Hispanics or Latinos of any race were 8.7% of the population.

The 2020–2024 American Community Survey estimated that the township contained 54 households and 54 housing units.
