= Solomon Township, Sheridan County, Kansas =

Township in Sheridan County, Kansas, U.S.

Solomon Township
- Township
- Location within Sheridan County

- Location within Kansas
- Coordinates: 39°13′00″N 100°38′12″W
- Country: United States
- State: Kansas
- County: Sheridan

Area
  - Total: 107.577 sq mi (278.62 km^{2})
  - Land: 107.535 sq mi (278.51 km^{2})
  - Water: 0.042 sq mi (0.11 km^{2}) 0.04%
- Elevation: 2,907 ft (886 m)

Population (2010)
  - Total: 135
  - Density: 1.26/sq mi (0.485/km^{2})
- Time zone: UTC-6 (CST)
  - Summer (DST): UTC-5 (CDT)
- Area code: 785
- GNIS feature ID: 471267

Solomon Township is a township in Sheridan County, Kansas, United States. As of the 2020 census, its population was 135.

== History ==
Sheridan Township was mostly settled originally by Germans, especially a group coming from Saint Bernard, Nebraska. The first church built in the township was built in 1891. The first school was built in 1892 but crop failures led to it closing in 1912.

== Geography ==
Solomon Township covers an area of 107.577 square miles (278.62 square kilometers).

=== Communities ===
- Angelus

=== Adjacent townships ===
Logan Township, Sheridan County
Menlo Township, Thomas County	northwest	north
South Randall Township, Thomas County	west	self	east	Springbrook Township, Sheridan County
		south	southeast	Grainfield Township, Gove County
Grinnell Township, Gove County
