= Philip Houston House =

Historice building in Kansas, U.S.

- Interactive map of the Philip Houston House area

General information
- Architectural style: Queen Anne style architecture
- Location: 350 Kansas Ave., Rexford, Kansas, United States
- Coordinates: 39°28′12.4″N 100°44′33.5″W

Philip Houston House is a historic building currently used as a lodging establishment in Rexford, Kansas, United States. It was built in 1906 in Gem, Kansas by Philip Sherman Houston, a landowner and banker who was an early Thomas County pioneer, and later moved to the location in Rexford. It is owned by The Shepherd's Staff, a conference venue in Rexford.

The establishment is styled in Queen Anne Victorian architecture. It is furnished with vintage décor — such as lace curtains, crystal chandeliers, antiques and original woodwork. It has three bedrooms, a library and a veranda.

The house was added to the Kansas Register of Historic Places in 2005.
