= Angelus, Kansas =

Unincorporated community in Sheridan County, Kansas

- Unincorporated community
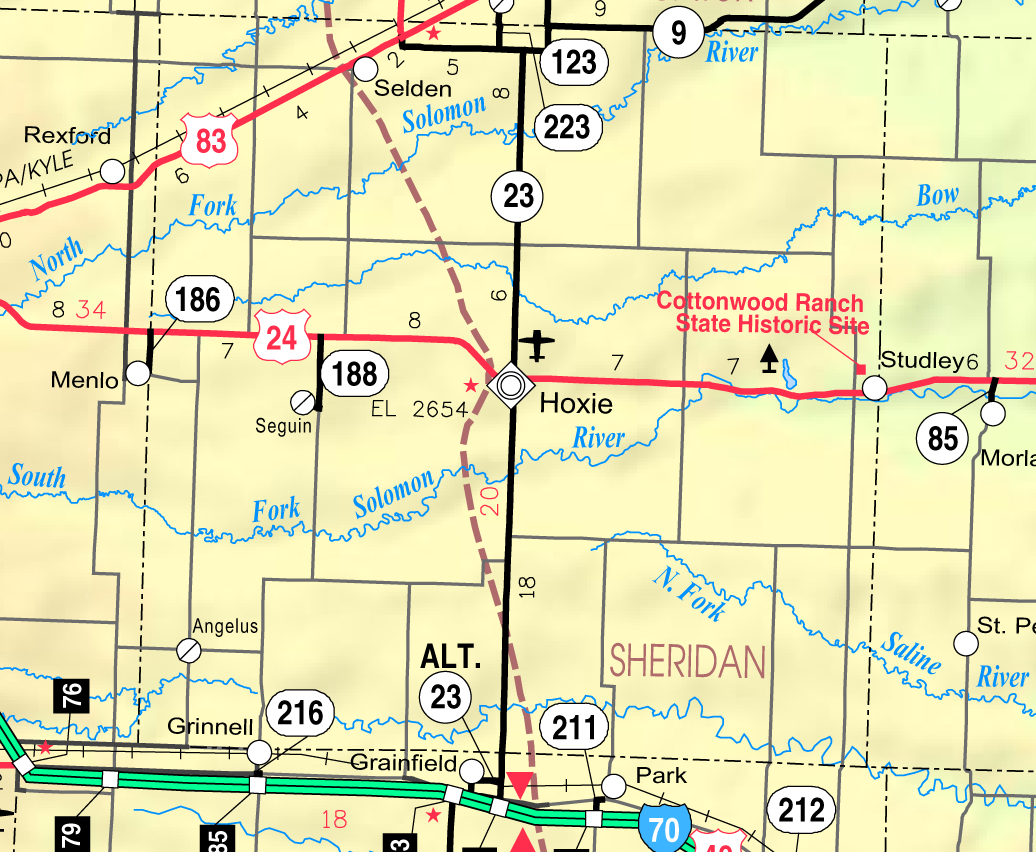
- KDOT map of Sheridan County (legend)

- Location within Kansas Location within the United States
- Coordinates: 39°11′28″N 100°41′04″W
- Country: United States
- State: Kansas
- County: Sheridan
- Elevation: 2,930 ft (890 m)
- Time zone: UTC-6 (CST)
  - Summer (DST): UTC-5 (CDT)
- Area code: 785
- FIPS code: 20-01825
- GNIS ID: 471308

Angelus is an unincorporated community in Sheridan County, Kansas, United States. It is located in Solomon Township, approximately 20 miles southwest of Hoxie. Also, it is located northwest of Grinnell and Interstate 70.

== History ==
A post office was opened in Angelus in 1894, and remained in operation until it was discontinued in 1911.

As of 1910, the community had a population of 30 and was a local trading center, with the nearest train stations in either Grinnell or Campus to the south in Gove County.

According to a history prepared by Fr. Menig of the Angelus parish church in 1937, the community was founded by german residents of Saint Bernard, Nebraska who were looking for less expensive, though still good, land for farming. The first settlers arrived in late 1887. St. Paul's church was founded at that time, and had 49 members by 1888. The community was named Angelus in 1892 by Rev. J. Disselkamp, the pastor of the church in Colby, Kansas which serviced the area. The church grew to 92 families and 588 members by 1937, and the community's Catholic school run by the Sisters of the Precious Blood had 80 students. A 1987 story on the community's 100th anniversary noted that "Angelus never really became a town, but was merely a community that grew up around its church." By that time, the community's earlier two grocery stores, three garages/gas stations, and all other businesses, had closed, leaving only the church, school, and a few homes.

Though there are not current formal population measures of Angelus, Solomon Township had a population of 179 in the 2010 census.
