= Colby High School (Kansas) =

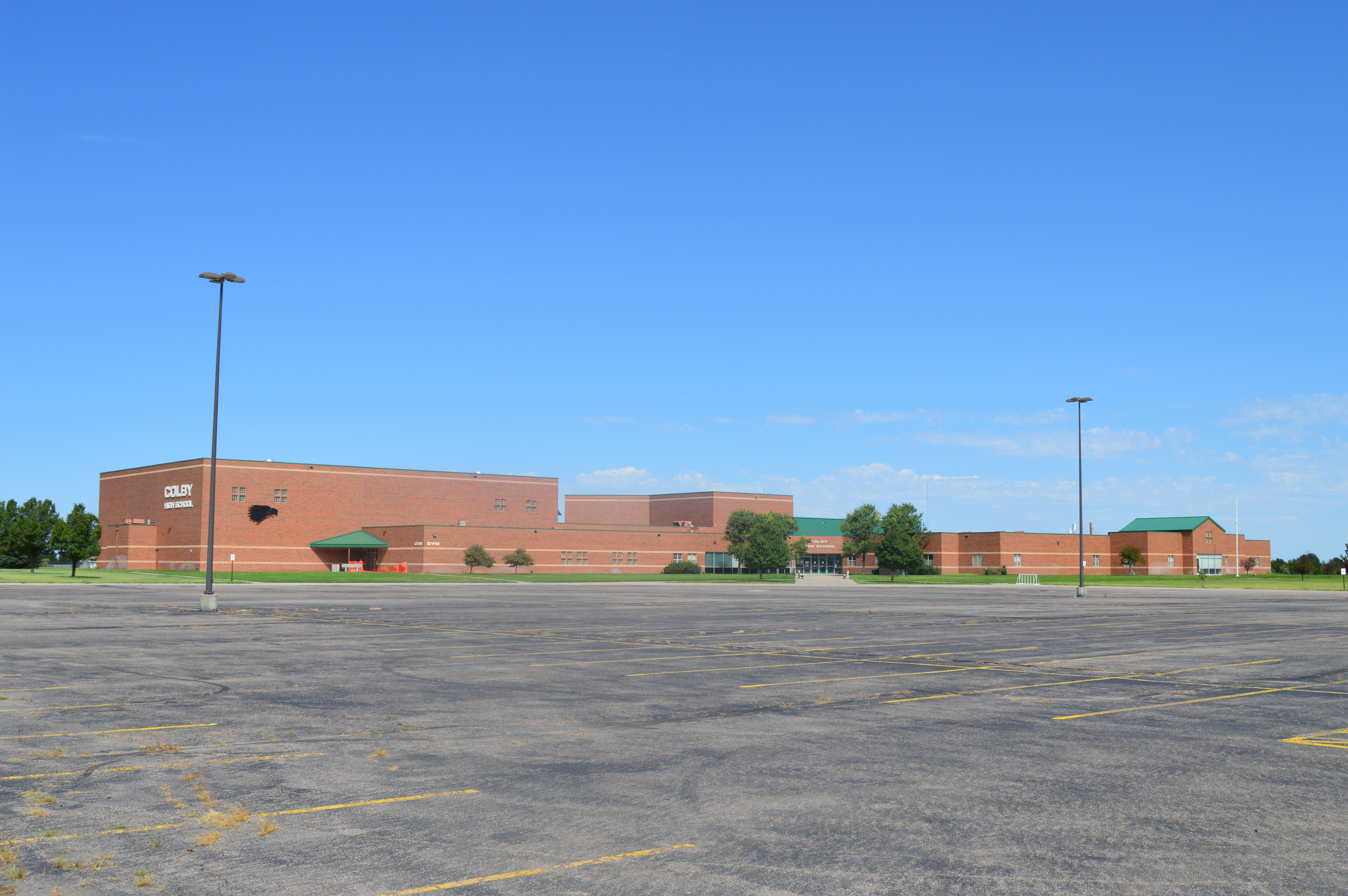
- Colby High School (2015)

Location
- 1890 South Franklin Avenue; Colby, Kansas 67701; United States; 39°22′19″N 101°02′53″W

Information
- School type: Public, High School
- School district: Colby USD 315
- CEEB code: 170625
- Principal: Matt Sims
- Teaching staff: 17.23 (FTE)
- Grades: 9-12
- Enrollment: 272 (2023–2024)
- Student to teacher ratio: 15.79
- Campus: Suburban
- Colors: Black and orange
- Mascot: Eagle
- Rival: Goodland High School
- Website: Colby High School

Colby High School is a public secondary school in Colby, Kansas, United States. It is located at 1890 S. Franklin Avenue, and operated by Colby USD 315 school district. It enrolls approximately 300 students every year. The current principal is Matt Sims.

== History ==
Colby High School was founded in 1890. As the community grew, so did the school, and eventually surrounding smaller schools in Levant, Kansas, and Gem, Kansas, were closed so students could attend classes at Colby. Until 1995, Colby High School was located on Third Street, but the need for a larger building was recognized, and thus emerged the building that accommodates the students and teachers now.

== Notable alumni ==
- Samuel Ramey, Class of 1960, American Opera singer
- Mark Schultz, Class of 1989, musician
- Nelson Toburen, Class of 1957, former professional football player for the Green Bay Packers

== See also ==
- List of high schools in Kansas
- List of unified school districts in Kansas
