= Ray Bechard =

American volleyball coach

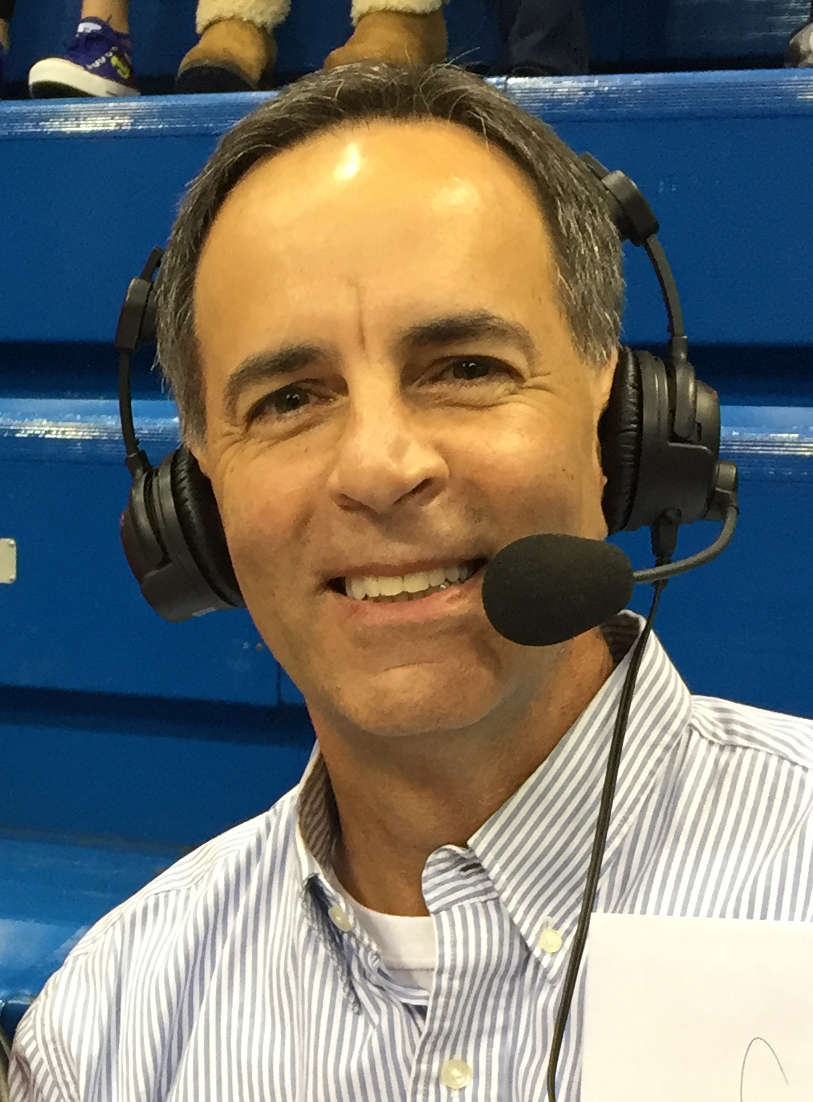
- Bechard during a radio interview in 2015

Biographical details
- Born: Grinnell, Kansas
- Education: Fort Hays State University, 1980

Coaching career (HC unless noted)
- 1985-1997: Barton Cougars
- 1998–2024: Kansas Jayhawks

Head coaching record
- Overall: 1,212-403 (496-313 at KU)

Accomplishments and honors

Championships
- Big 12 Conference Champions (2016); NCAA Tournament Regional Champions (2015); Kansas Jayhawk Community College Conference (14x)

Awards
- Big 12 Coach of the Year (2012, 2013, 2015, 2016); American Volleyball Coaches Association Hall of Fame, class of 2025; NJCAA Volleyball Hall of Fame, class of 1998

Ray Bechard is an American volleyball coach who served as head coach of the Kansas Jayhawks women's volleyball program from 1998 to 2024. He is the winningest coach in Kansas volleyball history and led the Jayhawks to the 2015 NCAA Final Four and the 2016 Big 12 Conference regular season championship.

Bechard announced his retirement from coaching on Dec. 27, 2024.

He was inducted into the American Volleyball Coaches Association Hall of Fame in 2025, and the National Junior College Athletic Association Volleyball Hall of Fame in 1998.

Bechard guided KU to 13 NCAA Tournament appearances, including three trips to the Sweet Sixteen and a stretch of six consecutive bids from 2012 to 2017. The Jayhawks finished with an AVCA Top 25 ranking seven times during his tenure, including a No. 4 ranking in 2015. He holds more than 1,100 career wins across four decades of coaching, including 13 seasons at Barton County Community College.

AVCA All-Americans coached
Player	Year
Camryn Turner	2024 Third Team
Toyosi Onabanjo	2024 Honorable Mention
Ainise Havili	2014 Honorable Mention; 2015 First Team; 2016 Third Team; 2017 Honorable Mention
Kelsie Payne	2015 First Team; 2016 First Team; 2017 Third Team
Madison Rigdon	2016 Honorable Mention; 2017 Honorable Mention
Cassie Wait	2016 Honorable Mention
Chelsea Albers	2013 Honorable Mention; 2014 Honorable Mention
Sara McClinton	2013 Honorable Mention
Erin McNorton	2013 Honorable Mention
Caroline Jarmoc	2012 Second Team; 2013 Third Team
Josi Lima	2003 Honorable Mention
