= South Randall Township, Kansas =

Township in Thomas County, Kansas, U.S.

South Randall Township
- Township
- Location within Thomas County
- Coordinates: 39.198513°N 100.832938°W
- Country: United States
- State: Kansas
- County: Thomas
- Established: 1910s

Government
  - Trustee: James Fellhoelter

Area
  - Total: 107.47 sq mi (278.3 km^{2})
  - Land: 107.423 sq mi (278.22 km^{2})
  - Water: 0.047 sq mi (0.12 km^{2}) 0.04%

Population (2020)
  - Total: 224
  - Density: 2.09/sq mi (0.805/km^{2})
- Time zone: UTC-6 (CST)
  - Summer (DST): UTC-5 (CDT)
- Area code: 785
- GNIS feature ID: 471260

South Randall Township is a township in Thomas County, Kansas, United States. As of the 2020 census, its population was 224.

== History ==
South Randall Township was originally part of Randall Township. Part of Randall Township was split off to became Menlo Township in 1908, and then shortly afterwards in the 1910s Randall Township was split into two, becoming North Randall Township and South Randall Township.

== Geography ==
South Randall Township covers an area of 107.47 square miles (278.3 km^{2}), 0.04% of it water.

=== Communities ===
- part of Oakley

=== Adjacent townships ===
North Randall Township, Thomas County	northwest		northeast	Menlo Township, Thomas County
Summers Township, Thomas County	west	self	east	Solomon Township, Sheridan County
		south	southeast	Grinnell Township, Gove County
Oakley Township, Logan County

== Transportation ==
=== Major highways ===
- I-70
- US-83

== Demographics ==
As of the 2020 census, the township had a population of 224, giving a population density of 2.09 people per square mile (0.81 people/km^{2}). The racial makeup of the township was 95.5% White, 3.6% Asian, and 0.9% from two or more races. Hispanics or Latinos of any race were 0.9% of the population.

The 2020–2024 American Community Survey estimated that the township contained 140 households and 144 housing units.
