= Quickville, Kansas =

Ghost town in Thomas County, Kansas

- Ghost town
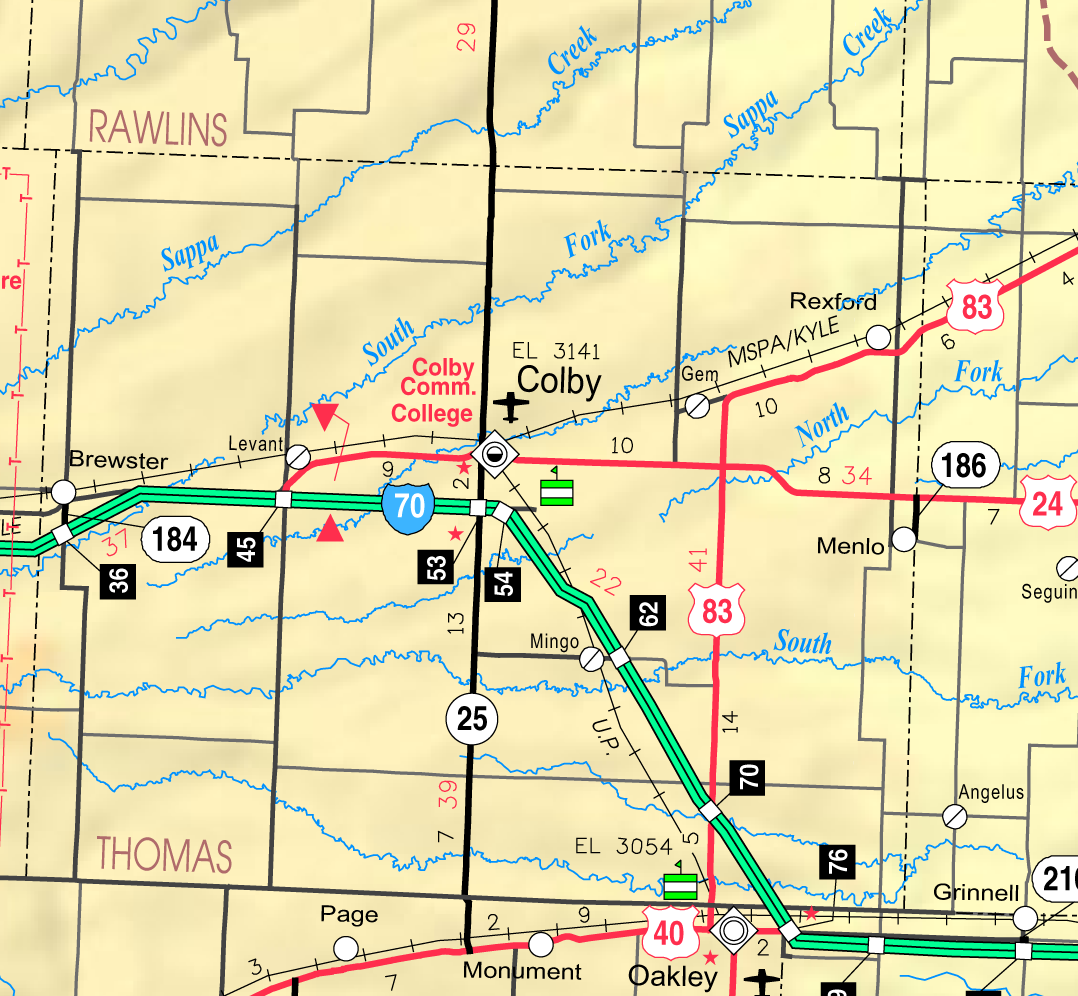
- KDOT map of Thomas County (legend)

- Location within Kansas Location within the United States
- Coordinates: 39°31′41.4″N 101°16′49.3″W
- Country: United States
- State: Kansas
- County: Thomas
- Elevation: 3,307 ft (1,008 m)

Population
  - Total: 0
- Time zone: UTC-6 (CST)
  - Summer (DST): UTC-5 (CDT)
- Area code: 785
- GNIS ID: 482662

Quickville is a ghost town in Thomas County, Kansas, United States. It is farm ground with no remaining structures.

== History ==
Quickville was platted on June 27, 1887, by the Thomas County Land and Townsite Co.

It was issued a post office in 1880. The post office was discontinued in 1909.
