= Otterbourne, Kansas =

Ghost town in Thomas County, Kansas

- Ghost town
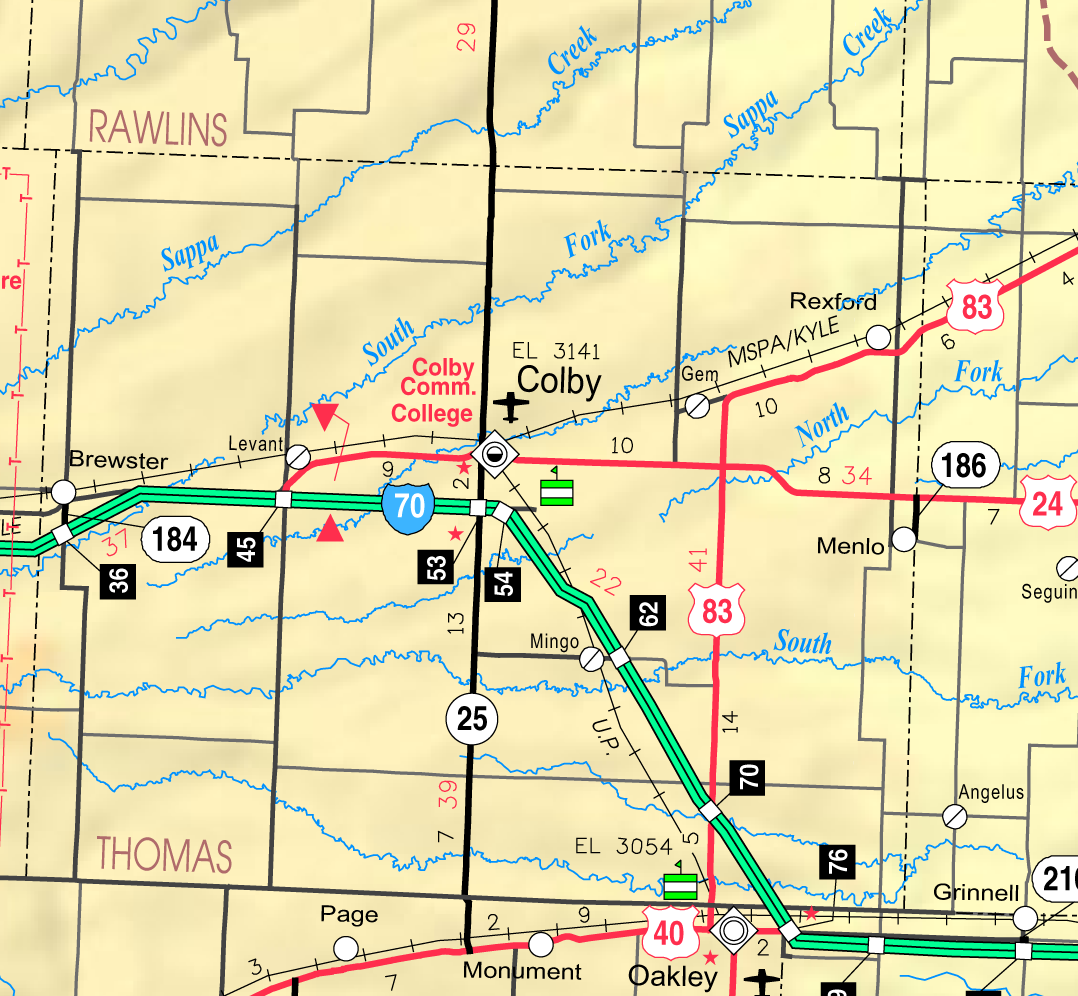
- KDOT map of Thomas County (legend)

- Location within Kansas Location within the United States
- Coordinates: 39°30′50″N 100°58′53″W
- Country: United States
- State: Kansas
- County: Thomas
- Elevation: 3,045 ft (928 m)

Population
  - Total: 0
- Time zone: UTC-6 (CST)
  - Summer (DST): UTC-5 (CDT)
- Area code: 785
- GNIS ID: 482662

Otterbourne is a ghost town in Thomas County, Kansas, United States.

== History ==
Otterbourne was issued a post office in 1881. The post office was discontinued in 1897.
