= Mingo, Kansas =

Unincorporated community in Thomas County, Kansas

Coordinates: 39°16′42″N 100°57′45″W

Mingo is an unincorporated community in Thomas County, Kansas, United States It is located approximately 6 miles (9.7 km) southeast of Colby, then west of I-70, exit 62 via a rural road.

== History ==
Mingo had a post office from 1888 until 1940; the post office was designated "Thurford" until 1894. The oldest active geocache in the world is near Mingo.

== Education ==
The community is served by Colby USD 315 public school district.
