= Levant, Kansas =

Unincorporated community in Thomas County, Kansas

- Unincorporated community and CDP
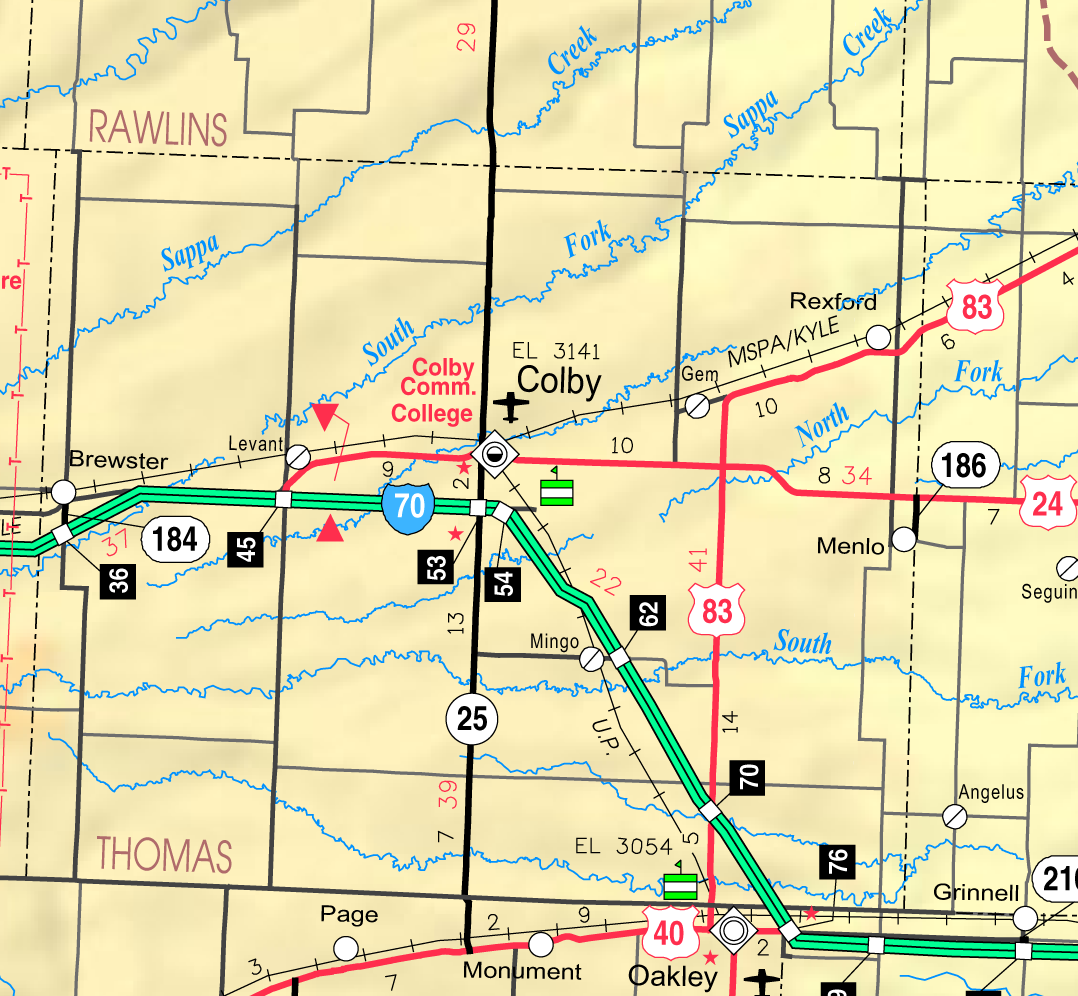
- KDOT map of Thomas County (legend)

- Location within Kansas Location within the United States
- Coordinates: 39°23′08″N 101°11′42″W
- Country: United States
- State: Kansas
- County: Thomas
- Elevation: 3,311 ft (1,009 m)

Population (2020)
  - Total: 68
- Time zone: UTC-6 (CST)
  - Summer (DST): UTC-5 (CDT)
- ZIP Code: 67743
- Area code: 785
- FIPS code: 20-39700
- GNIS ID: 471192

Levant is an unincorporated community and census-designated place (CDP) in Thomas County, Kansas, United States. As of the 2020 census, the population was 68. It is located approximately 7.5 miles (12.1 km) west of Colby.

== History ==
Levant has a post office with ZIP Code 67743. The post office in Levant was established in 1888.

== Climate ==
According to the Köppen Climate Classification system, Levant has a semi-arid climate, abbreviated "BSk" on climate maps.

== Demographics ==
Historical population
| Census | Pop. | Note | %± |
|---|---|---|---|
| 2020 | 68 | | — |
U.S. Decennial Census

The 2020 United States census counted 68 people, 22 households, and 14 families in Levant. The population density was 67.4 per square mile (26.0/km^{2}). There were 32 housing units at an average density of 31.7 per square mile (12.2/km^{2}). The racial makeup was 91.18% (62) white or European American (91.18% non-Hispanic white), 1.47% (1) black or African-American, 0.0% (0) Native American or Alaska Native, 0.0% (0) Asian, 0.0% (0) Pacific Islander or Native Hawaiian, 2.94% (2) from other races, and 4.41% (3) from two or more races. Hispanic or Latino of any race was 1.47% (1) of the population.

Of the 22 households, 9.1% had children under the age of 18; 59.1% were married couples living together; 13.6% had a female householder with no spouse or partner present. 27.3% of households consisted of individuals and 13.6% had someone living alone who was 65 years of age or older. The average household size was 1.8 and the average family size was 2.2. The percent of those with a bachelor's degree or higher was estimated to be 0.0% of the population.

27.9% of the population was under the age of 18, 5.9% from 18 to 24, 30.9% from 25 to 44, 17.6% from 45 to 64, and 17.6% who were 65 years of age or older. The median age was 37.7 years. For every 100 females, there were 100.0 males. For every 100 females ages 18 and older, there were 96.0 males.

== Education ==
The community is served by Colby USD 315 public school district.

Levant High School was closed through school unification. The Levant High School mascot was Tigers.
