= Brewster, Kansas =

City in Thomas County, Kansas

- City
- Location within Thomas County and Kansas

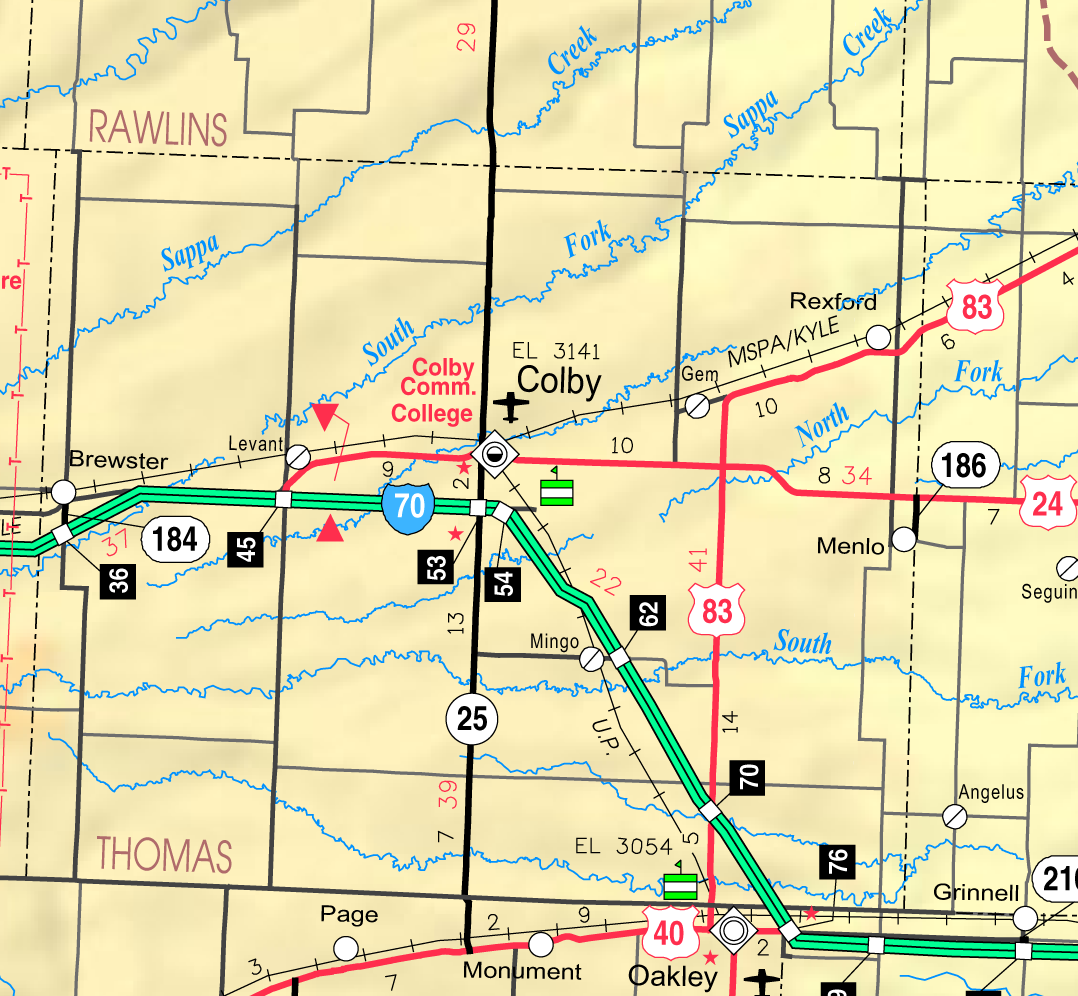
- KDOT map of Thomas County (legend)
- Coordinates: 39°21′47″N 101°22′36″W
- Country: United States
- State: Kansas
- County: Thomas
- Founded: 1880s
- Incorporated: 1920
- Named for: L.D. Brewster

Area
  - Total: 0.26 sq mi (0.67 km^{2})
  - Land: 0.26 sq mi (0.67 km^{2})
  - Water: 0 sq mi (0.00 km^{2})
- Elevation: 3,429 ft (1,045 m)

Population (2020)
  - Total: 291
  - Density: 1,100/sq mi (430/km^{2})
- Time zone: UTC-6 (CST)
  - Summer (DST): UTC-5 (CDT)
- ZIP Code: 67732
- Area code: 785
- FIPS code: 20-08425
- GNIS ID: 2393413
- Website: brewsterkansas.com

Brewster is a city in Thomas County, Kansas, United States. As of the 2020 census, the population of the city was 291.

== History ==
Brewster was named for L.D. Brewster, a railroad official. Brewster was a station and shipping point on the Chicago, Rock Island and Pacific Railroad.

The first post office in Brewster was established in September 1888.

== Geography ==
According to the United States Census Bureau, the city has a total area of 0.26 square miles (0.67 km^{2}), all land.

=== Climate ===
According to the Köppen climate classification system, Brewster has a semi-arid climate, abbreviated "BSk" on climate maps.

== Demographics ==
Historical population
Census	Pop.	Note	%±
1930	487		—
1940	408		−16.2%
1950	467		14.5%
1960	317		−32.1%
1970	320		0.9%
1980	327		2.2%
1990	296		−9.5%
2000	285		−3.7%
2010	305		7.0%
2020	291		−4.6%
U.S. Decennial Census

=== 2020 census ===
The 2020 United States census counted 291 people, 110 households, and 67 families in Brewster. The population density was 1,127.9 per square mile (435.5/km^{2}). There were 136 housing units at an average density of 527.1 per square mile (203.5/km^{2}). The racial makeup was 88.32% (257) white or European American (86.6% non-Hispanic white), 1.03% (3) black or African-American, 0.0% (0) Native American or Alaska Native, 0.34% (1) Asian, 0.0% (0) Pacific Islander or Native Hawaiian, 5.15% (15) from other races, and 5.15% (15) from two or more races. Hispanic or Latino of any race was 8.25% (24) of the population.

Of the 110 households, 32.7% had children under the age of 18; 54.5% were married couples living together; 20.9% had a female householder with no spouse or partner present. 36.4% of households consisted of individuals and 16.4% had someone living alone who was 65 years of age or older. The average household size was 2.8 and the average family size was 2.9. The percent of those with a bachelor's degree or higher was estimated to be 17.5% of the population.

26.8% of the population was under the age of 18, 8.9% from 18 to 24, 26.5% from 25 to 44, 22.7% from 45 to 64, and 15.1% who were 65 years of age or older. The median age was 34.3 years. For every 100 females, there were 95.3 males. For every 100 females ages 18 and older, there were 93.6 males.

The 2016–2020 5-year American Community Survey estimates show that the median household income was $59,297 (with a margin of error of +/- $27,453) and the median family income was $72,188 (+/- $33,585). Males had a median income of $43,281 (+/- $17,672) versus $20,903 (+/- $3,119) for females. The median income for those above 16 years old was $40,000 (+/- $6,176). Approximately, 7.7% of families and 10.1% of the population were below the poverty line, including 0.0% of those under the age of 18 and 27.1% of those ages 65 or over.

=== 2010 census ===
As of the census of 2010, there were 305 people, 122 households, and 87 families residing in the city. The population density was 1,173.1 inhabitants per square mile (452.9/km^{2}). There were 142 housing units at an average density of 546.2 per square mile (210.9/km^{2}). The racial makeup of the city was 92.5% White, 2.0% Native American, 0.3% Asian, 0.3% Pacific Islander, 3.9% from other races, and 1.0% from two or more races. Hispanic or Latino of any race were 9.8% of the population.

There were 122 households, of which 33.6% had children under the age of 18 living with them, 56.6% were married couples living together, 10.7% had a female householder with no husband present, 4.1% had a male householder with no wife present, and 28.7% were non-families. 26.2% of all households were made up of individuals, and 14.8% had someone living alone who was 65 years of age or older. The average household size was 2.50 and the average family size was 2.97.

The median age in the city was 40.4 years. 29.2% of residents were under the age of 18; 5.3% were between the ages of 18 and 24; 22.2% were from 25 to 44; 22.6% were from 45 to 64; and 20.7% were 65 years of age or older. The gender makeup of the city was 51.8% male and 48.2% female.

== Education ==
The community is served by Brewster USD 314 public school district.

The Brewster Bulldogs have won the following Kansas State High School championships:

- 1968 Boys Basketball - Class BB
- 1995 Boys Basketball - Class 1A
- 2000 Boys Basketball - Class 1A
- 2001 Boys Basketball - Class 1A
