= Copeland, Thomas County, Kansas =

Ghost town in Thomas County, Kansas

Copeland, Kansas
- Ghost town
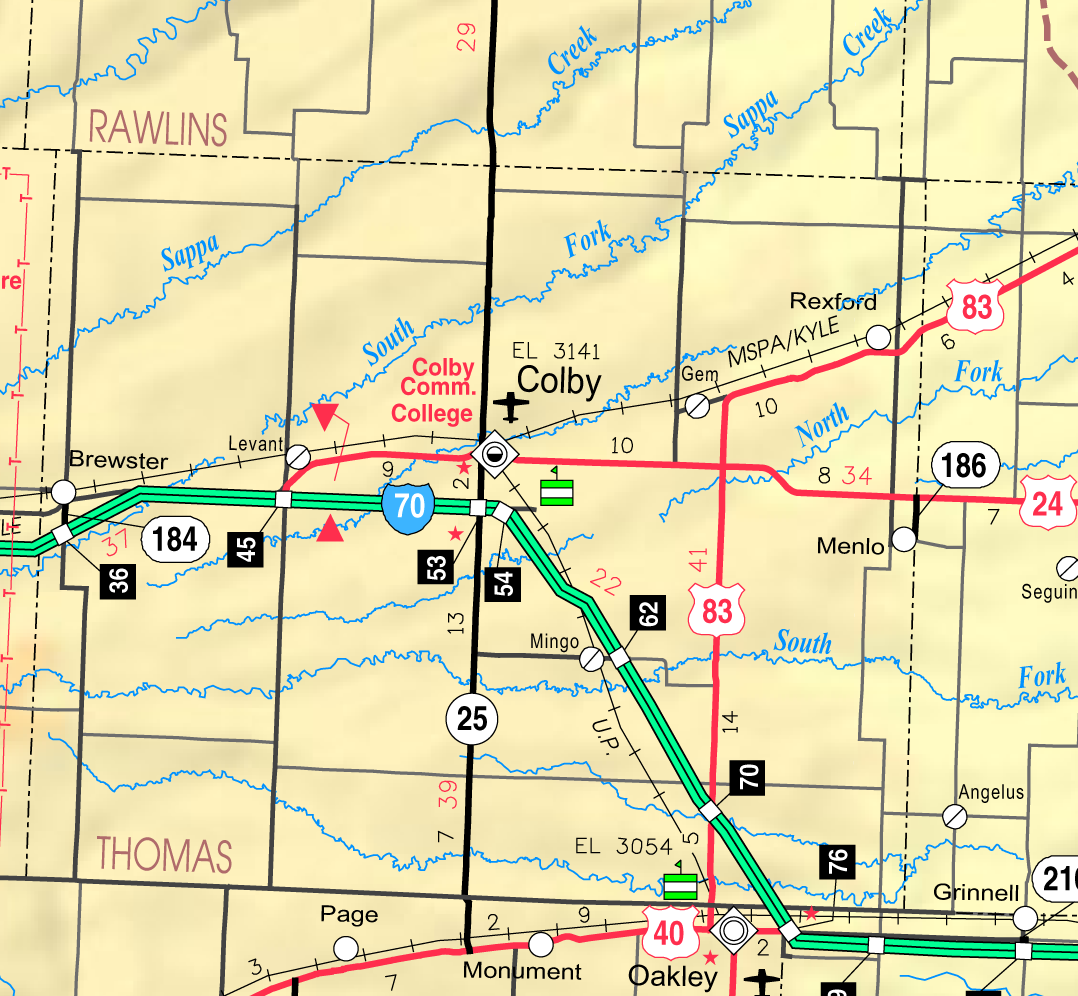
- KDOT map of Thomas County (legend)

- Location within Kansas Location within the United States
- Coordinates: 39°30′20″N 101°10′02″W
- Country: United States
- State: Kansas
- County: Thomas
- Elevation: 3,287 ft (1,002 m)

Population
  - Total: 0
- Time zone: UTC-6 (CST)
  - Summer (DST): UTC-5 (CDT)
- Area code: 785
- GNIS ID: 482661

Copeland is a ghost town in Thomas County, Kansas, United States.

== History ==
Copeland was issued a post office in 1886. The post office was discontinued in 1903.
