= Selden, Kansas =

City in Sheridan County, Kansas

- City
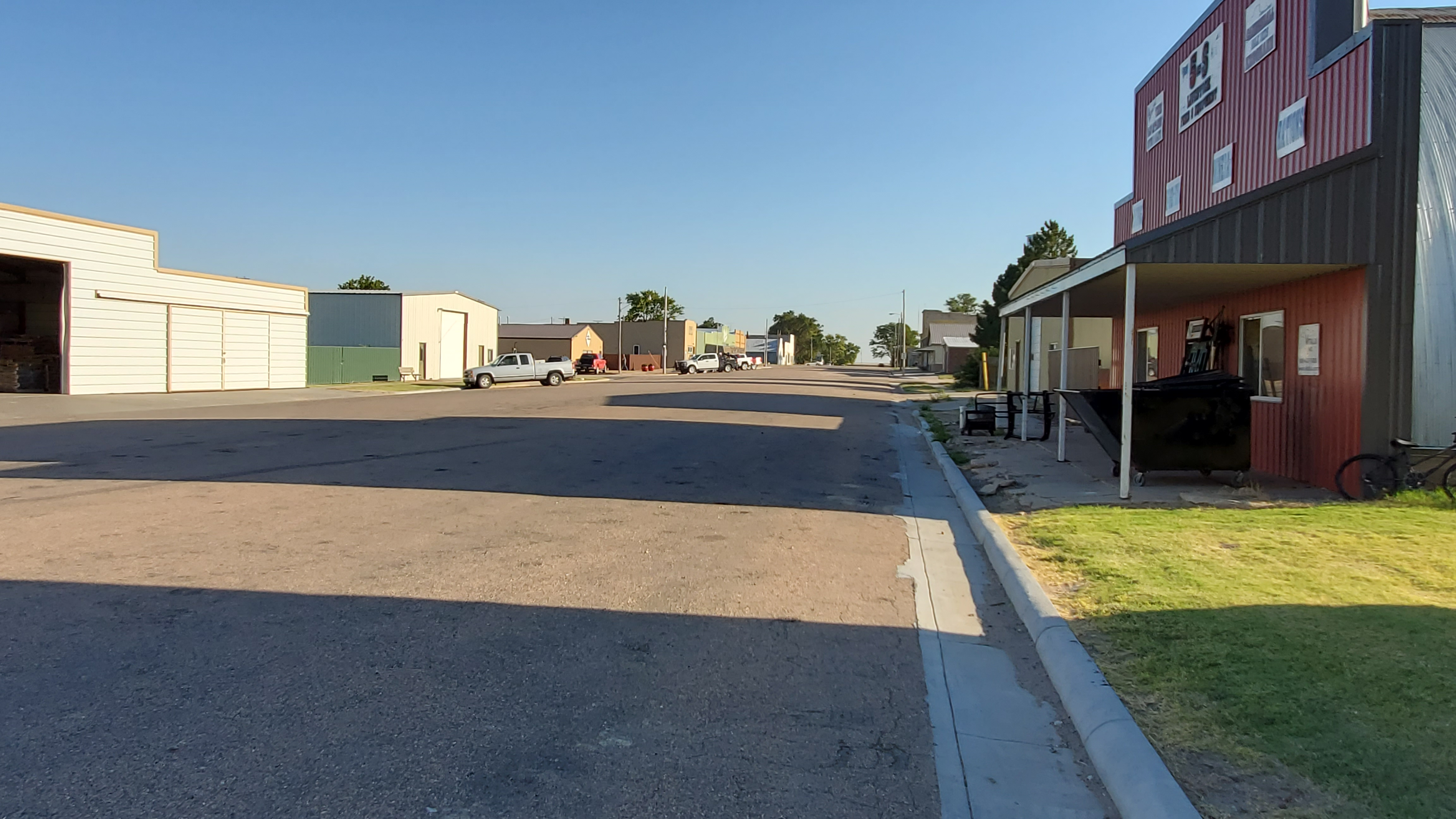
- Kansas Avenue (2020)

- Location within Sheridan County and Kansas

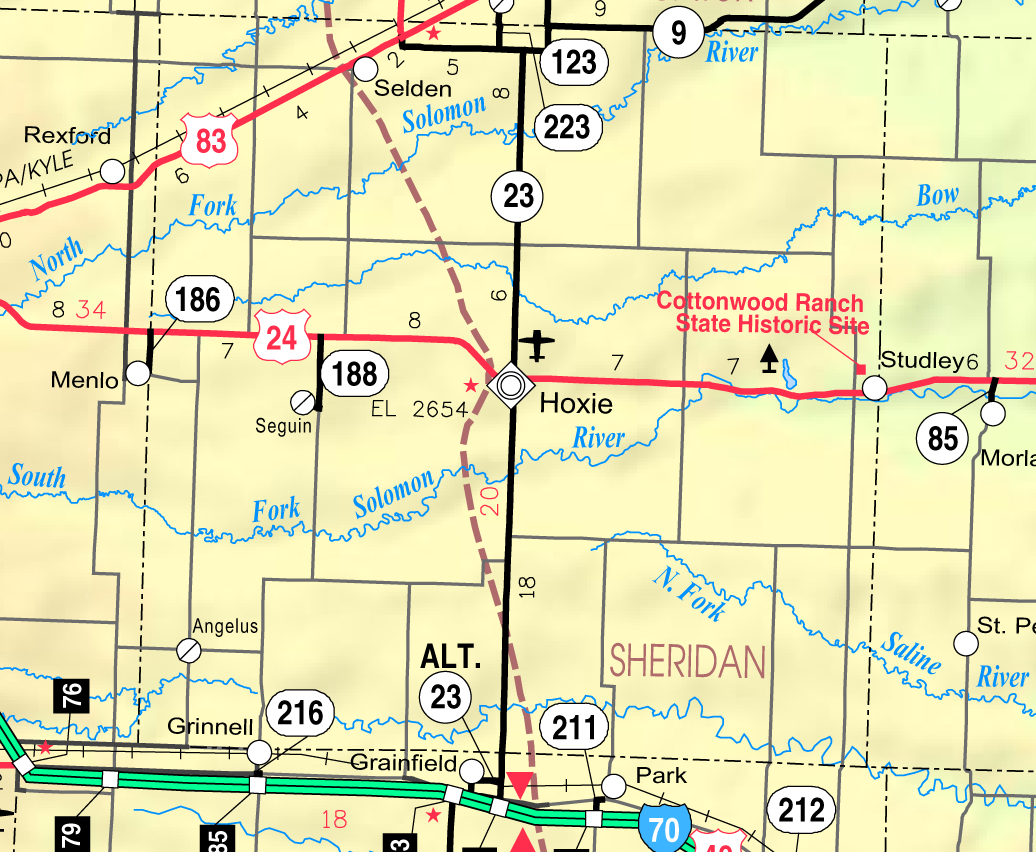
- KDOT map of Sheridan County (legend)
- Coordinates: 39°32′29″N 100°34′02″W
- Country: United States
- State: Kansas
- County: Sheridan
- Founded: 1880s
- Platted: 1888
- Incorporated: 1905
- Named for: Selden Hopkins

Area
  - Total: 0.31 sq mi (0.79 km^{2})
  - Land: 0.31 sq mi (0.79 km^{2})
  - Water: 0 sq mi (0.00 km^{2})
- Elevation: 2,838 ft (865 m)

Population (2020)
  - Total: 184
  - Density: 600/sq mi (230/km^{2})
- Time zone: UTC-6 (CST)
  - Summer (DST): UTC-5 (CDT)
- ZIP Code: 67757
- Area code: 785
- FIPS code: 20-63875
- GNIS ID: 2396571
- Website: City website

Selden is a city in Sheridan County, Kansas, United States. As of the 2020 census, the population of the city was 184.

== History ==
Selden was laid out in 1888. It was named for one of its founders, Selden G. Hopkins.

The first post office in Selden was established in July 1888.

On June 3, 1959, a severe thunderstorm dropped up to 18 inches (46 cm) of hail on the town. Hail fell in the town for a record 85 minutes and the temperature dropped from 80 °F (27 °C) to 38 °F (3 °C) at the height of the storm. Crops were completely destroyed by the storm with total losses.

On May 24, 2021 an EF1 tornado hit the community, flipping a train and damaging buildings. One person was injured.

== Geography ==
According to the United States Census Bureau, the city has a total area of 0.30 square miles (0.78 km^{2}), all land.

=== Climate ===
The climate in this area is characterized by hot, humid summers and generally mild to cool winters. According to the Köppen Climate Classification system, Selden has a humid subtropical climate, abbreviated "Cfa" on climate maps.

== Demographics ==
Historical population
| Census | Pop. | Note | %± |
|---|---|---|---|
| 1910 | 297 | | — |
| 1920 | 280 | | −5.7% |
| 1930 | 399 | | 42.5% |
| 1940 | 401 | | 0.5% |
| 1950 | 438 | | 9.2% |
| 1960 | 347 | | −20.8% |
| 1970 | 271 | | −21.9% |
| 1980 | 266 | | −1.8% |
| 1990 | 248 | | −6.8% |
| 2000 | 201 | | −19.0% |
| 2010 | 219 | | 9.0% |
| 2020 | 184 | | −16.0% |
U.S. Decennial Census

=== 2010 census ===
As of the census of 2010, there were 219 people, 101 households, and 57 families living in the city. The population density was 730.0 inhabitants per square mile (281.9/km^{2}). There were 118 housing units at an average density of 393.3 per square mile (151.9/km^{2}). The racial makeup of the city was 97.3% White, 0.5% Native American, and 2.3% from other races. Hispanic or Latino of any race were 6.8% of the population.

There were 101 households, of which 23.8% had children under the age of 18 living with them, 45.5% were married couples living together, 5.9% had a female householder with no husband present, 5.0% had a male householder with no wife present, and 43.6% were non-families. 39.6% of all households were made up of individuals, and 14.9% had someone living alone who was 65 years of age or older. The average household size was 2.17 and the average family size was 2.96.

The median age in the city was 43.7 years. 23.3% of residents were under the age of 18; 8.2% were between the ages of 18 and 24; 20.9% were from 25 to 44; 28.3% were from 45 to 64; and 19.2% were 65 years of age or older. The gender makeup of the city was 56.6% male and 43.4% female.

=== 2000 census ===
As of the census of 2000, there were 201 people, 103 households, and 55 families living in the city. The population density was 666.0 inhabitants per square mile (257.1/km^{2}). There were 118 housing units at an average density of 391.0 per square mile (151.0/km^{2}). The racial makeup of the city was 99.50% White, and 0.50% from two or more races.

There were 103 households, out of which 19.4% had children under the age of 18 living with them, 41.7% were married couples living together, 7.8% had a female householder with no husband present, and 46.6% were non-families. 44.7% of all households were made up of individuals, and 20.4% had someone living alone who was 65 years of age or older. The average household size was 1.95 and the average family size was 2.73.

In the city, the population was spread out, with 20.4% under the age of 18, 6.5% from 18 to 24, 25.9% from 25 to 44, 20.9% from 45 to 64, and 26.4% who were 65 years of age or older. The median age was 43 years. For every 100 females, there were 105.1 males. For every 100 females age 18 and over, there were 107.8 males.

The median income for a household in the city was $28,750, and the median income for a family was $37,500. Males had a median income of $20,417 versus $16,250 for females. The per capita income for the city was $17,137. About 8.9% of families and 10.0% of the population were below the poverty line, including 16.0% of those under the age of eighteen and 6.1% of those 65 or over.

== Education ==
The community is served by Golden Plains USD 316 public school district. School unification consolidated Menlo, Rexford and Selden schools forming USD 316. The Golden Plains High School mascot is Bulldogs.

Selden High School was closed through school unification. The Selden Wildcats won the Kansas State High School class B baseball championship in 1958.

== Transportation ==
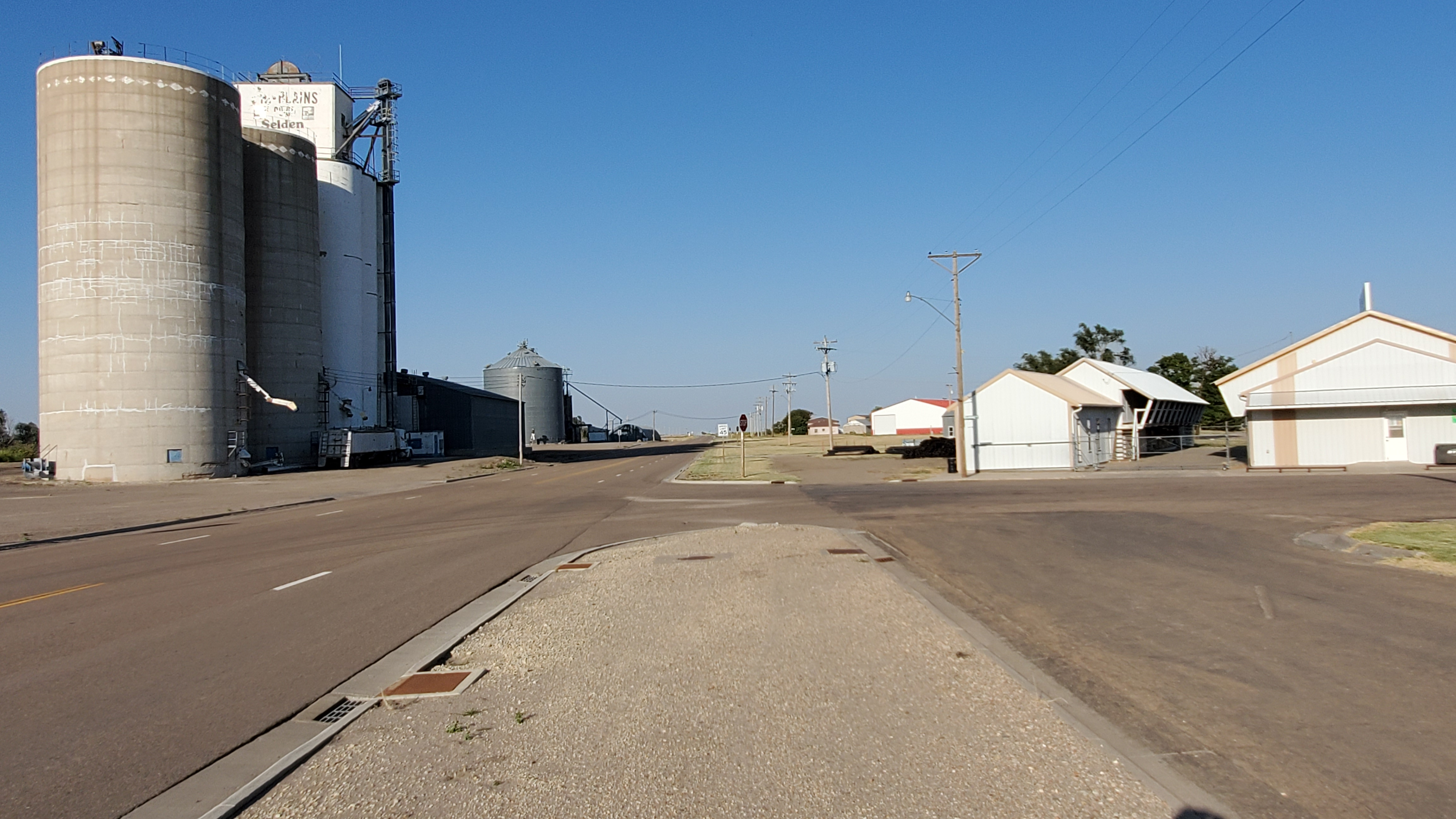
U.S. Route 83 (2020)

Selden is located on U.S. Route 83 where that highway parallels the track of the Chicago, Rock Island and Pacific Railroad, now operated by Kyle Railroad.

== Notable people ==
- Norman Malcolm (1911–1990), philosopher, author
- Travis Schlenk (c. 1976), former president of the Atlanta Hawks; since 2023, vice president of player personnel for the Washington Wizards

== See also ==
- Great Western Cattle Trail
