= Seguin, Kansas =

Unincorporated community in Sheridan County, Kansas

- Unincorporated community
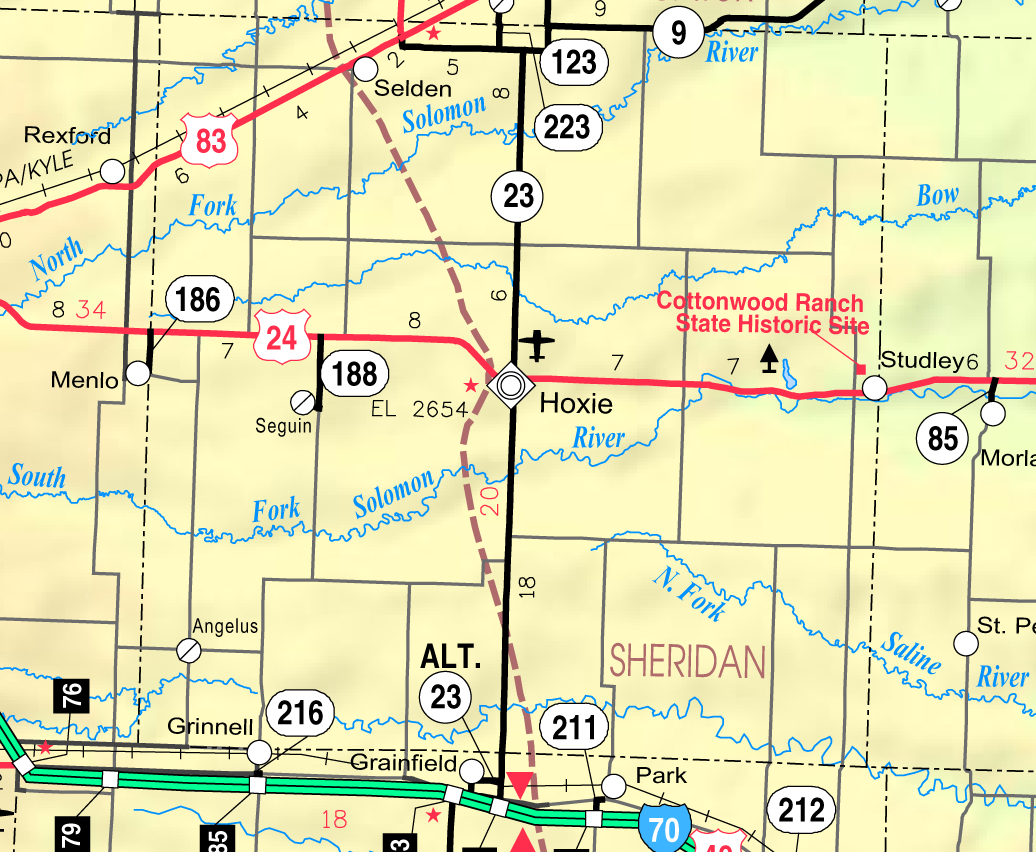
- KDOT map of Sheridan County (legend)

- Location within Kansas Location within the United States
- Coordinates: 39°20′15″N 100°35′42″W
- Country: United States
- State: Kansas
- County: Sheridan
- Township: Logan
- Elevation: 2,858 ft (871 m)
- Time zone: UTC-6 (CST)
  - Summer (DST): UTC-5 (CDT)
- Area code: 785
- FIPS code: 20-63850
- GNIS ID: 471269

Seguin is an unincorporated community in Sheridan County, Kansas, United States. It is located in Logan Township, approximately 10 miles west of Hoxie. It lies south of U.S. Route 24, to which it is linked by Kansas Highway 188.

== History ==
In its early days, the community was known as SeeQuinn. The community was primarily settled by German Catholics.

A post office was opened in Seguin in 1889, and remained in operation until it was discontinued in 1943. In 1910, the population was 11.

The 99-mile Plainville-Colby branch of the Union Pacific Railroad which passed through Seguin and dated from the late 1880s, was abandoned in 1998.

== Education ==
The community is served by Hoxie USD 412 public school district.
