= Travis Schlenk =

American sports executive (born 1976/1977)

Washington Wizards
- Position: VP of Player Personnel
- League: NBA

Personal information
- Born: Selden, Kansas, U.S.

Travis Schlenk (born 1976 or 1977) is an executive for the Washington Wizards of the NBA and a former executive for the Atlanta Hawks. Prior to joining the Hawks in May 2017, Schlenk was the assistant general manager of the Golden State Warriors, having joined that team prior to the 2004–05 season as a video scout. He has also worked as a video coordinator for the Miami Heat from 1999 to 2003, and as director of basketball operations for the University of Georgia basketball program from 1998 to 1999.

During his tenure with the Warriors, Schlenk developed a reputation for evaluating talent. He has been credited for being primarily responsible for identifying Draymond Green, picked 35th in the second round of the 2012 NBA draft.

Schlenk is a native of Selden, Kansas, graduated from Bethel College and holds a Master of Education degree from Wichita State University.

== Atlanta Hawks ==
On August 19, 2019, Schlenk was promoted to President of the Atlanta Hawks. Within a two-month span in 2020, Schlenk brought over Danilo Gallinari, Bogdan Bogdanović, Rajon Rondo, and Kris Dunn. Schlenk and the organization selected Onyeka Okongwu with the 6th overall pick in the 2020 NBA draft.

== Washington Wizards ==
In June 2023, Schlenk was hired as the VP of Player Personnel for the Washington Wizards under new president Michael Winger.

== See also ==
- List of National Basketball Association team presidents
