= Cumberland, Kansas =

Ghost town in Thomas County, Kansas

- Ghost town
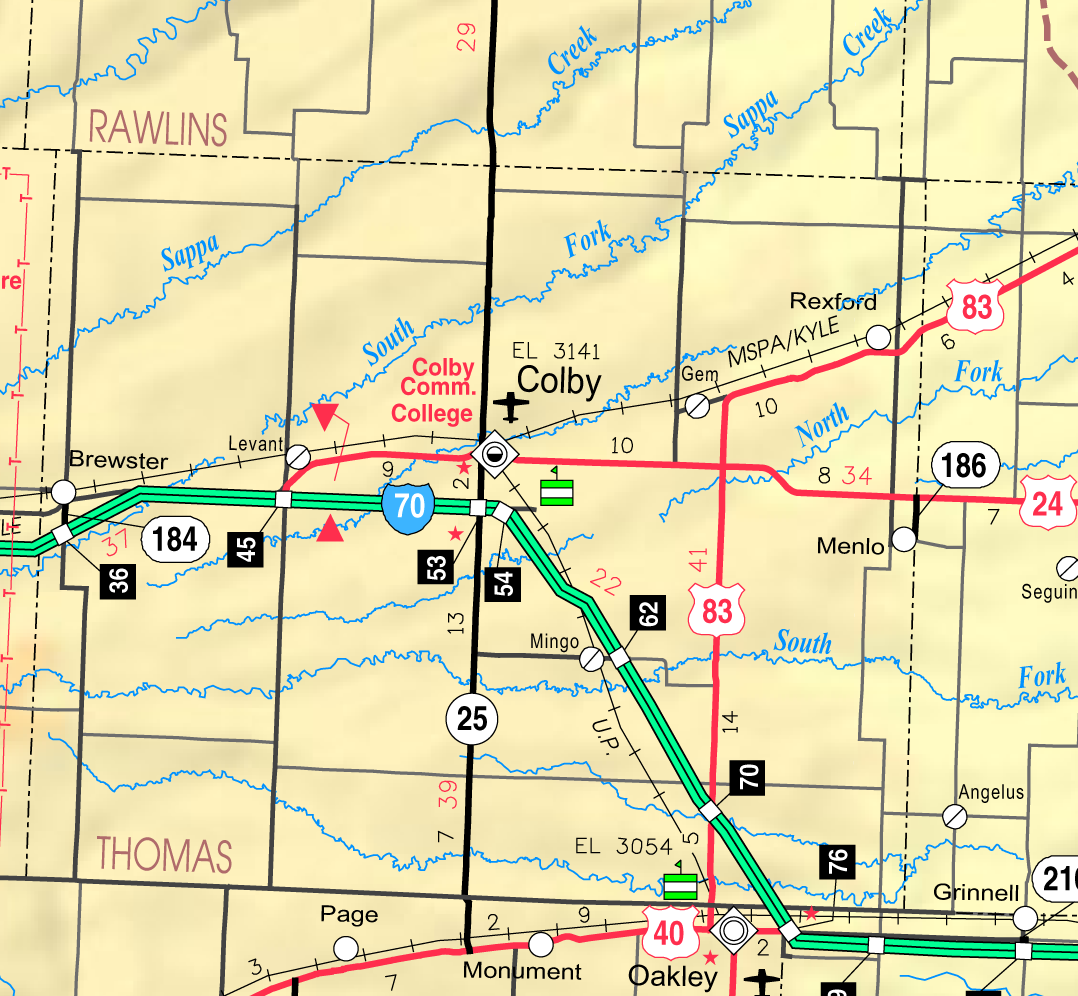
- KDOT map of Thomas County (legend)

- Location within Kansas Location within the United States
- Coordinates: 39°33′15″N 100°54′17″W
- Country: United States
- State: Kansas
- County: Thomas
- Elevation: 3,002 ft (915 m)

Population
  - Total: 0
- Time zone: UTC-6 (CST)
  - Summer (DST): UTC-5 (CDT)
- Area code: 785
- GNIS ID: 482661

Cumberland is a ghost town in Thomas County, Kansas, United States.

== History ==
Cumberland was issued a post office in 1880. The post office was discontinued in 1887.
