= Menlo Township, Kansas =

Township in Thomas County, Kansas, U.S.

Menlo Township
- Township
- Location within Thomas County
- Coordinates: 39.327117°N 100.780821°W
- Country: United States
- State: Kansas
- County: Thomas
- Established: 1908

Government
  - Trustee: Adam Ryan

Area
  - Total: 54.113 sq mi (140.15 km^{2})
  - Land: 54.111 sq mi (140.15 km^{2})
  - Water: 0.002 sq mi (0.0052 km^{2}) 0.004%

Population (2020)
  - Total: 82
  - Density: 1.5/sq mi (0.59/km^{2})
- Time zone: UTC-6 (CST)
  - Summer (DST): UTC-5 (CDT)
- Area code: 785
- GNIS feature ID: 471210

Menlo Township is a township in Thomas County, Kansas, United States. As of the 2020 census, its population was 82.

== History ==
Menlo Township was established in 1908 after being separated from Randall Township, which would later be split into North Randall Township and South Randall Township.

== Geography ==
Menlo Township covers an area of 54.113 square miles (140.15 km^{2}), 0.004% of it water.

=== Communities ===
- Menlo

=== Adjacent townships ===
Smith Township, Thomas County
Lacey Township, Thomas County	northwest	north	northeast	Bloomfield Township, Sheridan County
North Randall Township, Thomas County	west	self	east	Logan Township, Sheridan County
		south	southeast	Solomon Township, Sheridan County
South Randall Township, Thomas County

== Transportation ==
=== Major highways ===
- US-24

== Demographics ==
As of the 2020 census, the township had a population of 82, giving a population density of 1.5 people per square mile (0.58 people/km^{2}). The racial makeup of the township was 95.1% White, and 4.9% from two or more races. Hispanics or Latinos of any race were 4.9% of the population.

The 2020–2024 American Community Survey estimated that the township contained 23 households and 31 housing units.
