= North Randall Township, Kansas =

Township in Thomas County, Kansas, U.S.

North Randall Township
- Township
- Location within Thomas County
- Coordinates: 39.328921°N 100.879711°W
- Country: United States
- State: Kansas
- County: Thomas
- Established: 1910s

Government
  - Trustee: Lonnie Wilson

Area
  - Total: 53.243 sq mi (137.90 km^{2})
  - Land: 53.226 sq mi (137.85 km^{2})
  - Water: 0.017 sq mi (0.044 km^{2}) 0.03%

Population (2020)
  - Total: 50
  - Density: 0.94/sq mi (0.36/km^{2})
- Time zone: UTC-6 (CST)
  - Summer (DST): UTC-5 (CDT)
- Area code: 785
- GNIS feature ID: 484332

North Randall Township is a township in Thomas County, Kansas, United States. As of the 2020 census, its population was 50.

== History ==
North Randall Township was originally part of Randall Township. Part of Randall Township was split off to became Menlo Township in 1908, and then shortly afterwards in the 1910s Randall Township was split into two, becoming North Randall Township and South Randall Township.

== Geography ==
North Randall Township covers an area of 53.243 square miles (137.90 km^{2}), 0.03% of it water.

=== Communities ===
- Halford

=== Adjacent townships ===
Lacey Township, Thomas County
		north	northeast	Smith Township, Thomas County
Morgan Township, Thomas County	west	self	east	Menlo Township, Thomas County
Summers Township, Thomas County	southwest	south
South Randall Township, Thomas County

== Transportation ==
=== Major highways ===
- I-70
- US-24
- US-83

== Demographics ==
As of the 2020 census, the township had a population of 50, giving a population density of 0.94 people per square mile (0.36 people/km^{2}). The racial makeup of the township was 78.0% White, 2.0% Black or African American, 2.0% from some other race, and 18.0% from two or more races. Hispanics or Latinos of any race were 20.0% of the population.

The 2020–2024 American Community Survey estimated that the township contained 16 households and 16 housing units.
