= Rexford, Kansas =

City in Thomas County, Kansas

- City
- Location within Thomas County and Kansas

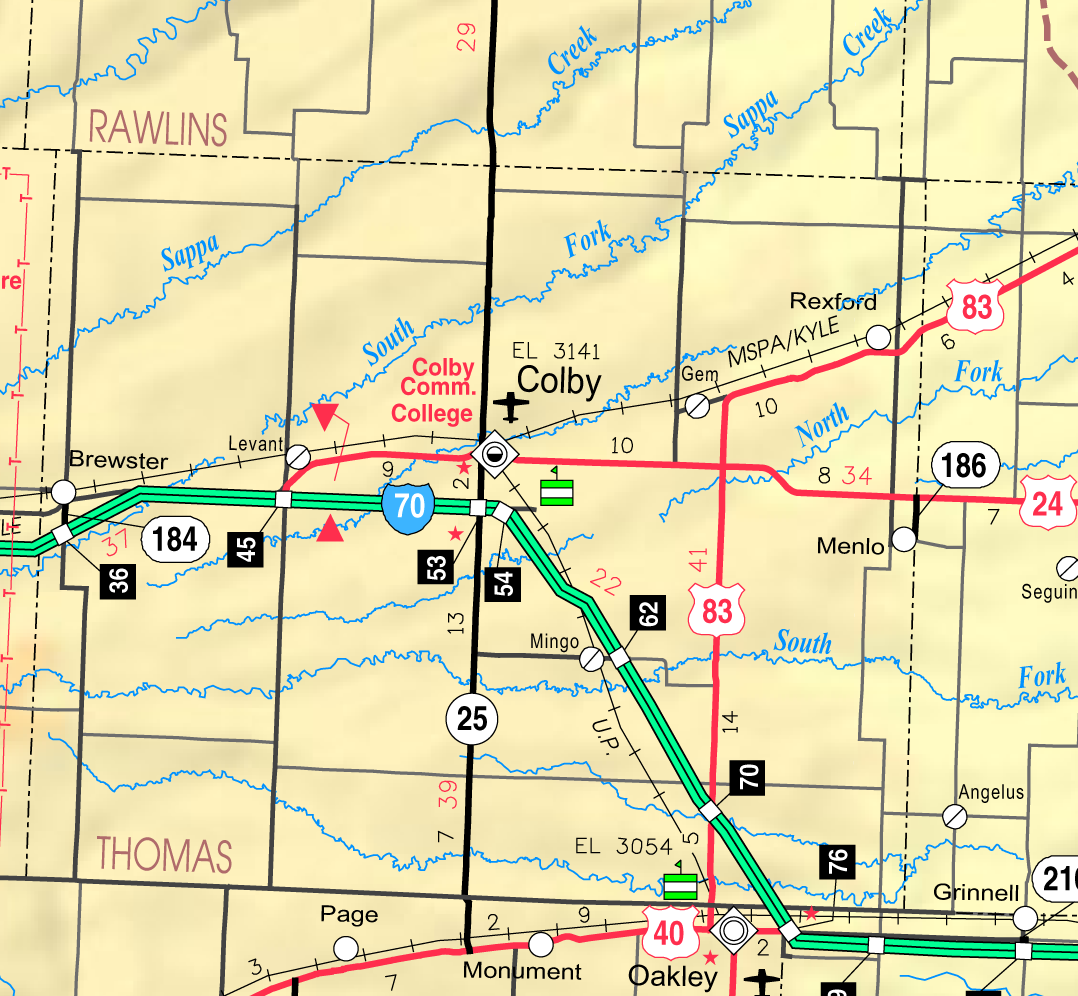
- KDOT map of Thomas County (legend)
- Coordinates: 39°28′14″N 100°44′38″W
- Country: United States
- State: Kansas
- County: Thomas
- Founded: 1887
- Incorporated: 1917
- Named for: Rexford family

Area
  - Total: 0.26 sq mi (0.68 km^{2})
  - Land: 0.26 sq mi (0.68 km^{2})
  - Water: 0 sq mi (0.00 km^{2})
- Elevation: 2,956 ft (901 m)

Population (2020)
  - Total: 197
  - Density: 750/sq mi (290/km^{2})
- Time zone: UTC-6 (CST)
  - Summer (DST): UTC-5 (CDT)
- ZIP Code: 67753
- Area code: 785
- FIPS code: 20-59125
- GNIS ID: 2396356

Rexford is a city in Thomas County, Kansas, United States. As of the 2020 census, the population of the city was 197.

== History ==
Rexford was founded in approximately 1887. It was named in honor of a member of the Rexford family who died in a fire that engulfed the family home. They were some of the first settlers in the area and had been there for years.

The first post office in Rexford was established in August 1888.

== Geography ==
Rexford is located along U.S. Route 83, approximately 20 miles north of Interstate 70. According to the United States Census Bureau, the city has a total area of 0.26 square miles (0.67 km^{2}), all land.

=== Climate ===
The climate in this area is characterized by hot, humid summers and generally mild to cool winters. The region has occasional, significant blizzards when the entire area can be without electricity. According to the Köppen Climate Classification system, Rexford has a humid subtropical climate, abbreviated "Cfa" on climate maps.

== Demographics ==
Historical population
Census	Pop.	Note	%±
1920	237		—
1930	375		58.2%
1940	244		−34.9%
1950	304		24.6%
1960	245		−19.4%
1970	231		−5.7%
1980	204		−11.7%
1990	171		−16.2%
2000	157		−8.2%
2010	232		47.8%
2020	197		−15.1%
U.S. Decennial Census

=== 2020 census ===
The 2020 United States census counted 197 people, 84 households, and 54 families in Rexford. The population density was 754.8 per square mile (291.4/km^{2}). There were 106 housing units at an average density of 406.1 per square mile (156.8/km^{2}). The racial makeup was 73.1% (144) white or European American (52.79% non-Hispanic white), 0.51% (1) black or African-American, 0.51% (1) Native American or Alaska Native, 0.0% (0) Asian, 0.0% (0) Pacific Islander or Native Hawaiian, 11.17% (22) from other races, and 14.72% (29) from two or more races. Hispanic or Latino of any race was 40.61% (80) of the population.

Of the 84 households, 28.6% had children under the age of 18; 36.9% were married couples living together; 25.0% had a female householder with no spouse or partner present. 26.2% of households consisted of individuals and 10.7% had someone living alone who was 65 years of age or older. The average household size was 2.0 and the average family size was 3.3. The percent of those with a bachelor's degree or higher was estimated to be 11.7% of the population.

25.4% of the population was under the age of 18, 6.6% from 18 to 24, 28.4% from 25 to 44, 23.9% from 45 to 64, and 15.7% who were 65 years of age or older. The median age was 36.9 years. For every 100 females, there were 87.6 males. For every 100 females ages 18 and older, there were 90.9 males.

The 2016–2020 5-year American Community Survey estimates show that the median household income was $46,250 (with a margin of error of +/- $39,691) and the median family income was $73,750 (+/- $44,780). Males had a median income of $46,932 (+/- $24,573). The median income for those above 16 years old was $45,114 (+/- $11,536). Approximately, 24.3% of families and 19.1% of the population were below the poverty line, including 37.8% of those under the age of 18 and 0.0% of those ages 65 or over.

=== 2010 census ===
According to the 2010 census, there were 232 people, 84 households, and 52 families residing in the city. The population density was 892.3 inhabitants per square mile (344.5/km^{2}). There were 104 housing units at an average density of 400.0 per square mile (154.4/km^{2}). The racial makeup of the city was 74.1% White, 0.4% African American, 0.4% Native American, 23.3% from other races, and 1.7% from two or more races. Hispanic or Latino of any race were 26.3% of the population.

There were 84 households, of which 47.6% had children under the age of 18 living with them, 51.2% were married couples living together, 7.1% had a female householder with no husband present, 3.6% had a male householder with no wife present, and 38.1% were non-families. 31.0% of all households were made up of individuals, and 13.1% had someone living alone who was 65 years of age or older. The average household size was 2.76 and the average family size was 3.71.

The median age in the city was 31.5 years. 36.2% of residents were under the age of 18; 6.5% were between the ages of 18 and 24; 27.6% were from 25 to 44; 15.5% were from 45 to 64; and 14.2% were 65 years of age or older. The gender makeup of the city was 50.0% male and 50.0% female.

== Education ==
School unification consolidated Menlo, Rexford and Selden schools forming USD 316 Golden Plains. Golden Plains High School is located in Rexford. The Golden Plains High School mascot is the Bulldog.

Rexford High School was closed through school unification. The Rexford High School mascot was also the Bulldog. Golden Plains High School won the 1985 Class 1A Boys Basketball State Championship. That team has been enshrined in the KSHSAA Hall of Fame.

== See also ==
- Philip Houston Bed and Breakfast
