= Colby USD 315 =

Public school district in Colby, Kansas

Address
- 600 W 3rd St. Colby, Kansas, 67701; United States
- Coordinates: 39.39577°N 101.05243°W

District information
- Type: Public
- Grades: K to 12
- Schools: 3

Other information
- Website: colbyeagles.org

Colby USD 315 is a public unified school district headquartered in Colby, Kansas, United States. The district includes the communities of Colby, Gem, Levant, Mingo, and nearby rural areas.

== Schools ==
The school district operates the following schools:

- Colby High School (9–12)
- Colby Middle School (5–8)
- Colby Grade School (K–4)

== See also ==
- Kansas State Department of Education
- Kansas State High School Activities Association
- List of high schools in Kansas
- List of unified school districts in Kansas
