= Menlo, Kansas =

City in Thomas County, Kansas

- City
- Location within Thomas County and Kansas

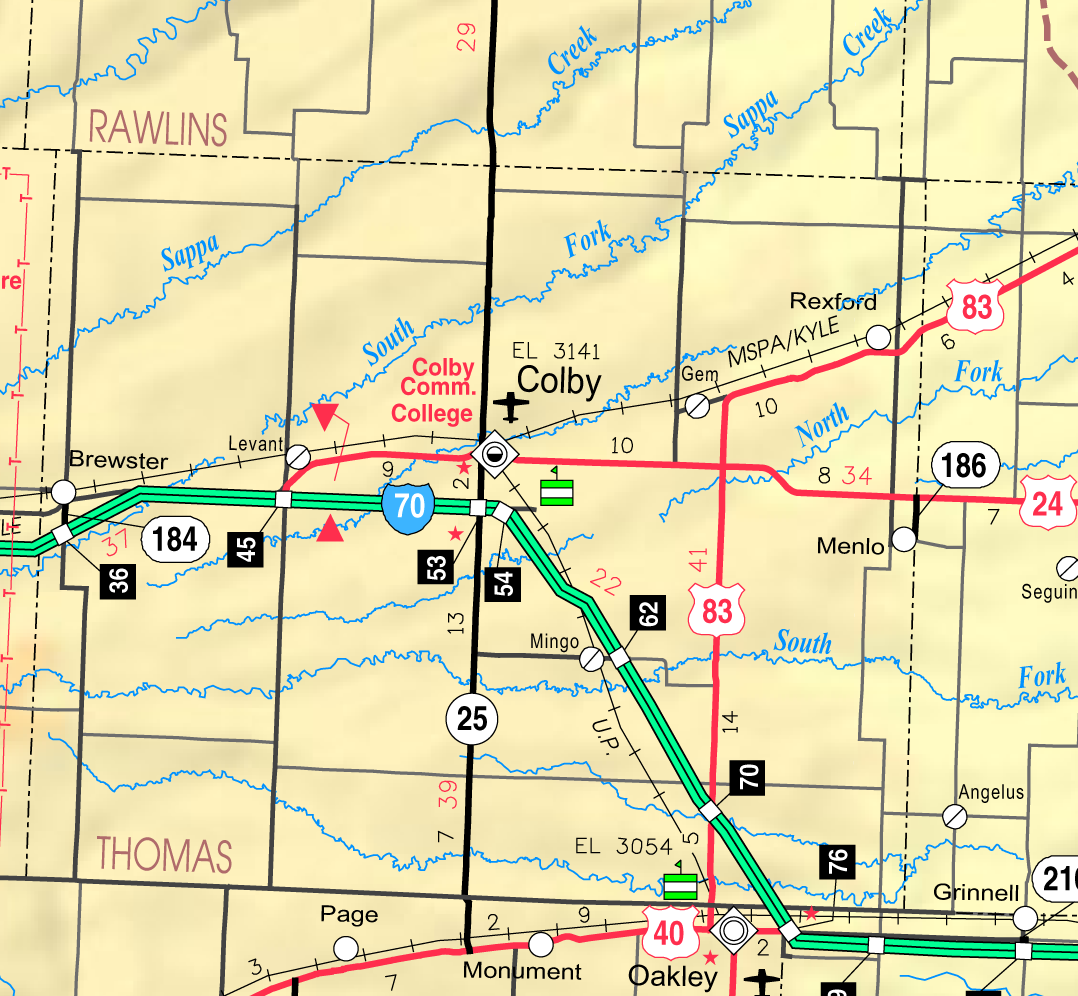
- KDOT map of Thomas County (legend)
- Coordinates: 39°21′22″N 100°43′27″W
- Country: United States
- State: Kansas
- County: Thomas
- Founded: 1880s
- Incorporated: 1926

Area
  - Total: 0.12 sq mi (0.30 km^{2})
  - Land: 0.12 sq mi (0.30 km^{2})
  - Water: 0 sq mi (0.00 km^{2})
- Elevation: 2,950 ft (900 m)

Population (2020)
  - Total: 33
  - Density: 280/sq mi (110/km^{2})
- Time zone: UTC-6 (CST)
  - Summer (DST): UTC-5 (CDT)
- ZIP Code: 67753
- Area code: 785
- FIPS code: 20-45750
- GNIS ID: 2395099

Menlo is a city in Thomas County, Kansas, United States. As of the 2020 census, the population of the city was 33.

== History ==
Menlo was located on the Union Pacific Railroad as it existed at the time. The rail line subsequently moved south, and the tracks through Menlo have been removed.

A post office was opened in Menlo in 1888, and remained in operation until it was discontinued in 1992.

== Geography ==
According to the United States Census Bureau, the city has a total area of 0.12 square miles (0.31 km^{2}), all land.

== Demographics ==
Historical population
Census	Pop.	Note	%±
1930	204		—
1940	144		−29.4%
1950	113		−21.5%
1960	99		−12.4%
1970	48		−51.5%
1980	42		−12.5%
1990	50		19.0%
2000	57		14.0%
2010	61		7.0%
2020	33		−45.9%
U.S. Decennial Census

=== 2020 census ===
The 2020 United States census counted 33 people, 15 households, and 15 families in Menlo. The population density was 282.1 per square mile (108.9/km^{2}). There were 15 housing units at an average density of 128.2 per square mile (49.5/km^{2}). The racial makeup was 96.97% (32) white or European American (96.97% non-Hispanic white), 0.0% (0) black or African-American, 0.0% (0) Native American or Alaska Native, 0.0% (0) Asian, 0.0% (0) Pacific Islander or Native Hawaiian, 0.0% (0) from other races, and 3.03% (1) from two or more races. Hispanic or Latino of any race was 3.03% (1) of the population.

Of the 15 households, 46.7% had children under the age of 18; 80.0% were married couples living together; 13.3% had a female householder with no spouse or partner present. 0.0% of households consisted of individuals and 0.0% had someone living alone who was 65 years of age or older. The average household size was 3.7 and the average family size was 3.7.

24.2% of the population was under the age of 18, 6.1% from 18 to 24, 15.2% from 25 to 44, 45.5% from 45 to 64, and 9.1% who were 65 years of age or older. The median age was 45.8 years. For every 100 females, there were 73.7 males. For every 100 females ages 18 and older, there were 66.7 males.

The 2016–2020 5-year American Community Survey estimates show that the median household income was $83,333 (with a margin of error of +/- $34,034) and the median family income was $83,333 (+/- $34,034). Males had a median income of $41,875 (+/- $34,679). The median income for those above 16 years old was $36,000 (+/- $10,786).

=== 2010 census ===
According to the 2010 census, there were 61 people, 18 households, and 15 families residing in the city. The population density was 508.3 inhabitants per square mile (196.3/km^{2}). There were 22 housing units at an average density of 183.3 per square mile (70.8/km^{2}). The racial makeup of the city was 98.4% White and 1.6% Native American. Hispanic or Latino of any race were 1.6% of the population.

There were 18 households, of which 44.4% had children under the age of 18 living with them, 77.8% were married couples living together, 5.6% had a male householder with no wife present, and 16.7% were non-families. 16.7% of all households were made up of individuals, and 5.6% had someone living alone who was 65 years of age or older. The average household size was 3.39 and the average family size was 3.80.

The median age in the city was 26.5 years. 36.1% of residents were under the age of 18; 8.3% were between the ages of 18 and 24; 32.8% were from 25 to 44; 18% were from 45 to 64; and 4.9% were 65 years of age or older. The gender makeup of the city was 45.9% male and 54.1% female.

== Education ==
School unification consolidated Menlo, Rexford and Selden schools forming USD 316 Golden Plains. The Golden Plains High School mascot is Bulldogs.

Menlo High School was closed through school unification. The Menlo High School mascot was Menlo Tigers.
