= Halford, Kansas =

Unincorporated community in Thomas County, Kansas

Coordinates: 39°22′23″N 100°52′12″W

Halford is an unincorporated community in Thomas County, Kansas, United States. It is located approximately 9 miles (14 km) east of Colby.

== History ==
Halford had a post office from 1892 until 1953.
