= Bloomfield Township, Sheridan County, Kansas =

Township in Sheridan County, Kansas, U.S.

Bloomfield Township
- Township
- Location within Sheridan County

- Location within Kansas
- Coordinates: 39°26′15″N 100°39′52″W
- Country: United States
- State: Kansas
- County: Sheridan

Area
  - Total: 35.999 sq mi (93.24 km^{2})
  - Land: 35.999 sq mi (93.24 km^{2})
  - Water: 0 sq mi (0 km^{2}) 0%
- Elevation: 2,904 ft (885 m)

Population (2020)
  - Total: 36
  - Density: 1.0/sq mi (0.39/km^{2})
- Time zone: UTC-6 (CST)
  - Summer (DST): UTC-5 (CDT)
- Area code: 785
- GNIS feature ID: 471213

Bloomfield Township is a township in Sheridan County, Kansas, United States. As of the 2020 census, its population was 36.

== History ==
In 1887, there was no one living in the township but by 1888, the population had grown to 288. In 1899, there was a major locust swarm in the township.

== Geography ==
Bloomfield Township covers an area of 35.999 square miles (93.24 square kilometers).

=== Adjacent townships ===
Prairie Dog Township, Sheridan County
Wendell Township, Thomas County	northwest	north	northeast	Sheridan Township, Sheridan County
Smith Township, Thomas County	west	self	east	Parnell Township, Sheridan County
Menlo Township, Thomas County	southwest	south
Logan Township, Sheridan County

== Transportation ==
=== Major highways ===
- US-83
