= Logan Township, Sheridan County, Kansas =

Township in Sheridan County, Kansas, U.S.

Logan Township
- Township
- Location within Sheridan County

- Location within Kansas
- Coordinates: 39°21′00″N 100°37′02″W
- Country: United States
- State: Kansas
- County: Sheridan

Area
  - Total: 71.852 sq mi (186.10 km^{2})
  - Land: 71.823 sq mi (186.02 km^{2})
  - Water: 0.029 sq mi (0.075 km^{2}) 0.04%
- Elevation: 2,897 ft (883 m)

Population (2020)
  - Total: 130
  - Density: 1.8/sq mi (0.70/km^{2})
- GNIS feature ID: 471216

Logan Township is a township in Sheridan County, Kansas, United States. As of the 2020 census, its population was 130.

== Geography ==
Logan Township covers an area of 71.852 square miles (186.10 square kilometers).

=== Communities ===
- Seguin

=== Adjacent townships ===
Bloomfield Township, Sheridan County
Smith Township, Thomas County	northwest	north	northeast	Parnell Township, Sheridan County
Menlo Township, Thomas County	west	self	east	Kenneth Township, Sheridan County
		south	southeast	Springbrook Township, Sheridan County
Solomon Township, Sheridan County

== Transportation ==
=== Major highways ===
- US-24
