= Grinnell, Kansas =

City in Gove County, Kansas

- City
- Location within Gove County and Kansas

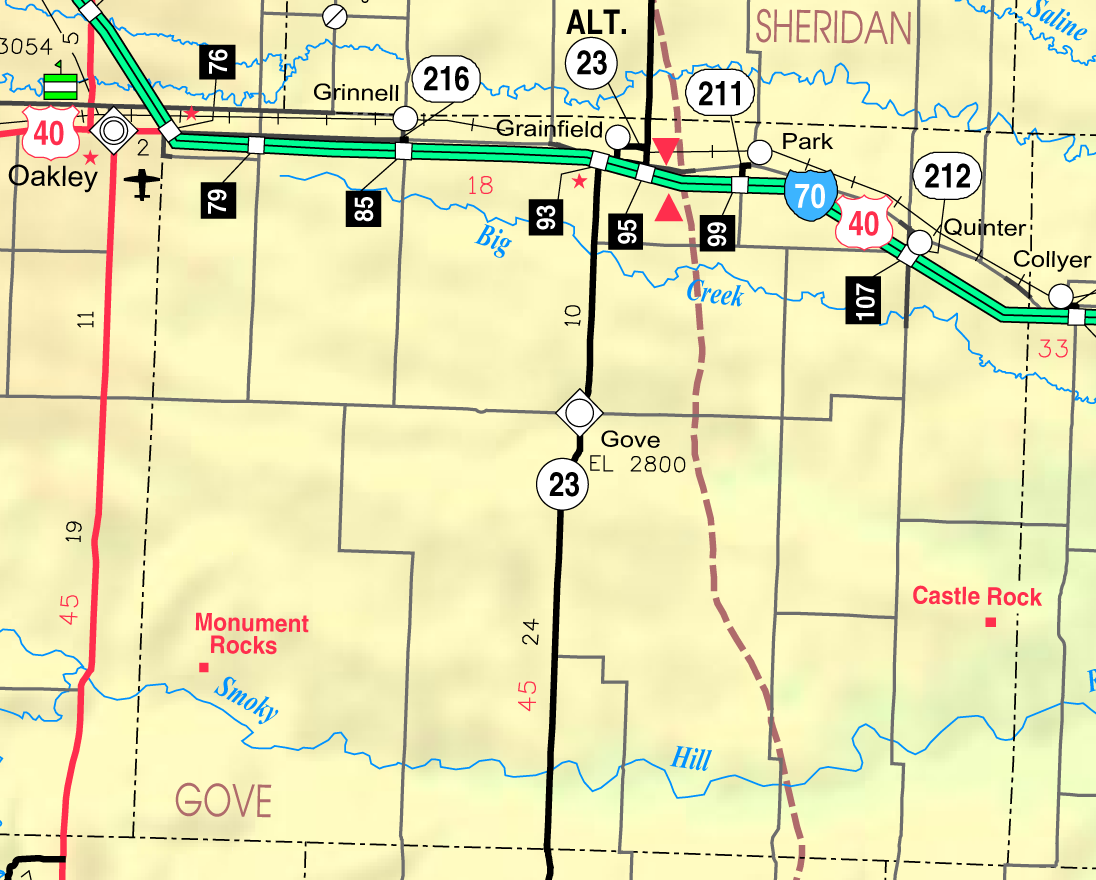
- KDOT map of Gove County (legend)
- Coordinates: 39°07′36″N 100°37′52″W
- Country: United States
- State: Kansas
- County: Gove
- Township: Grinnell
- Founded: 1880s
- Incorporated: 1917
- Named for: Moses Grinnell

Area
  - Total: 0.49 sq mi (1.27 km^{2})
  - Land: 0.49 sq mi (1.27 km^{2})
  - Water: 0 sq mi (0.00 km^{2})
- Elevation: 2,914 ft (888 m)

Population (2020)
  - Total: 260
  - Density: 530/sq mi (200/km^{2})
- Time zone: UTC-6 (CST)
  - Summer (DST): UTC-5 (CDT)
- ZIP Code: 67738
- Area code: 785
- FIPS code: 20-28900
- GNIS ID: 2394253

Grinnell is a city in Gove County, Kansas, United States. As of the 2020 census, the population of the city was 260. It is located approximately 0.5 miles (0.80 km) north of the intersection of I-70 and Grove County Rd 30.

== History ==
Grinnell was named for businessman Moses Hicks Grinnell.

The first newspaper in Grinnell was the Golden Belt, in 1885.

=== 2025 tornado ===
Before 7pm on May 18, 2025, an EF3 tornado struck the west side of Grinnell causing heavy damage to roughly 15 to 20 homes.

== Geography ==
According to the United States Census Bureau, the city has a total area of 0.51 square miles (1.32 km^{2}), all land.

== Demographics ==
Historical population
Census	Pop.	Note	%±
1920	162		—
1930	303		87.0%
1940	289		−4.6%
1950	364		26.0%
1960	396		8.8%
1970	449		13.4%
1980	410		−8.7%
1990	348		−15.1%
2000	329		−5.5%
2010	259		−21.3%
2020	260		0.4%
U.S. Decennial Census

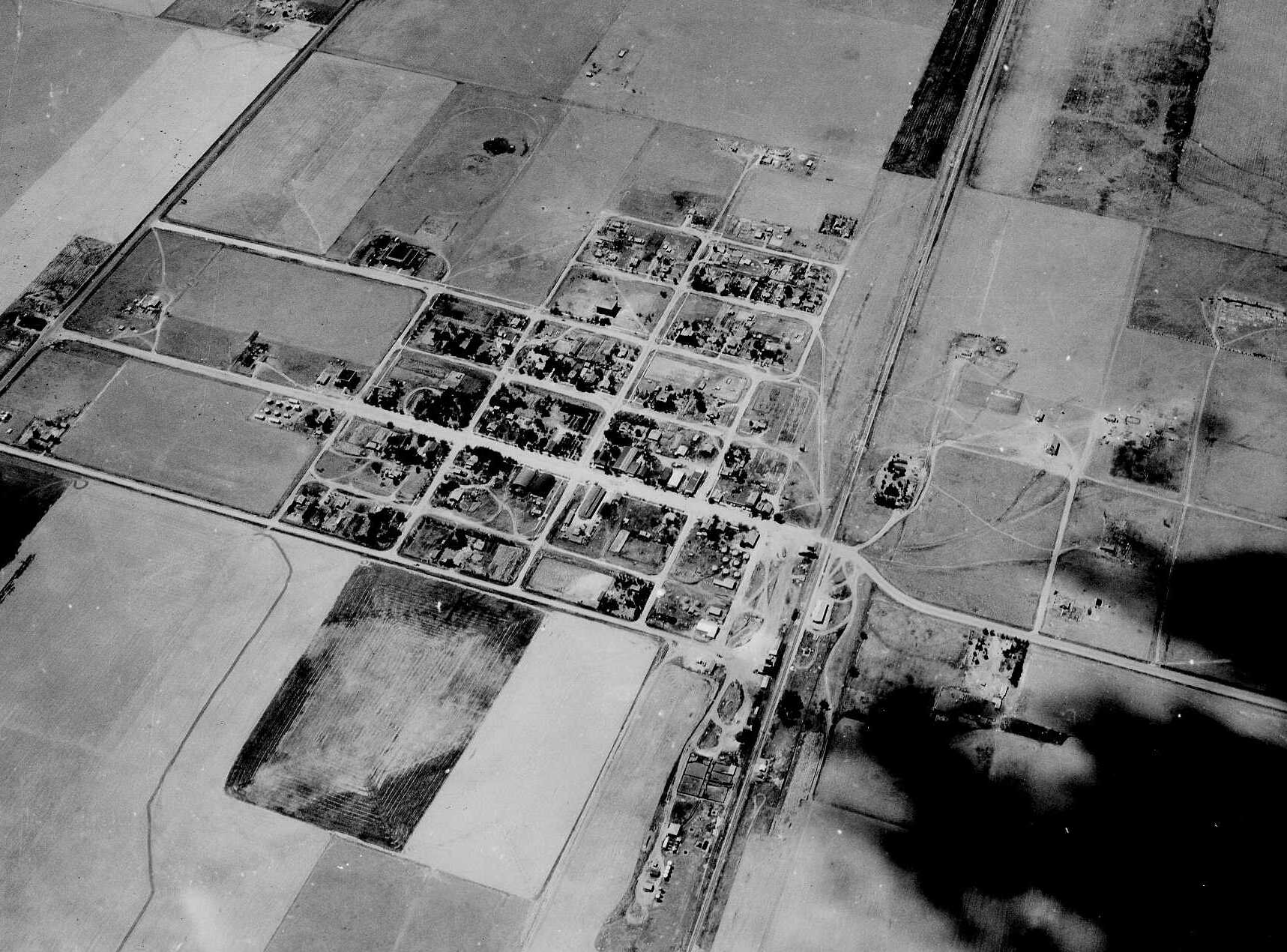
Grinnell in 1943

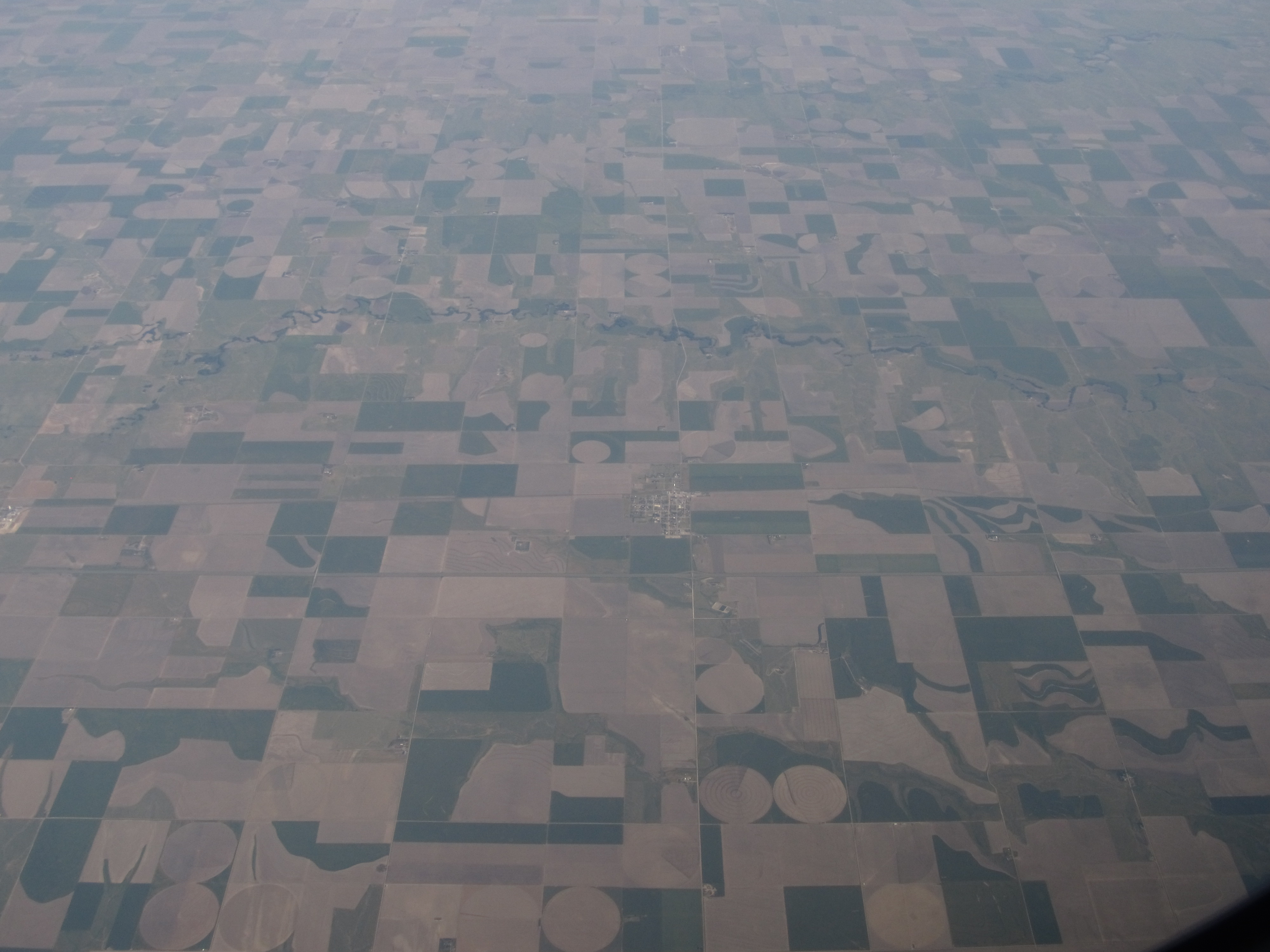
Grinnell area in 2012

=== 2020 census ===
The 2020 United States census counted 260 people, 129 households, and 68 families in Grinnell. The population density was 528.5 per square mile (204.0/km^{2}). There were 151 housing units at an average density of 306.9 per square mile (118.5/km^{2}). The racial makeup was 94.62% (246) white or European American (92.69% non-Hispanic white), 0.0% (0) black or African-American, 0.0% (0) Native American or Alaska Native, 0.0% (0) Asian, 0.0% (0) Pacific Islander or Native Hawaiian, 2.31% (6) from other races, and 3.08% (8) from two or more races. Hispanic or Latino of any race was 5.38% (14) of the population.

Of the 129 households, 16.3% had children under the age of 18; 41.9% were married couples living together; 24.8% had a female householder with no spouse or partner present. 44.2% of households consisted of individuals and 23.3% had someone living alone who was 65 years of age or older. The average household size was 2.0 and the average family size was 2.8. The percent of those with a bachelor's degree or higher was estimated to be 16.2% of the population.

21.5% of the population was under the age of 18, 6.2% from 18 to 24, 20.0% from 25 to 44, 23.8% from 45 to 64, and 28.5% who were 65 years of age or older. The median age was 46.0 years. For every 100 females, there were 83.1 males. For every 100 females ages 18 and older, there were 90.7 males.

The 2016–2020 5-year American Community Survey estimates show that the median household income was $55,769 (with a margin of error of +/- $9,039) and the median family income was $62,500 (+/- $5,637). Males had a median income of $60,368 (+/- $11,714) versus $24,583 (+/- $12,636) for females. The median income for those above 16 years old was $41,667 (+/- $9,898). Approximately, 1.4% of families and 2.6% of the population were below the poverty line, including 3.2% of those under the age of 18 and 5.3% of those ages 65 or over.

=== 2010 census ===
As of the census of 2010, there were 259 people, 135 households, and 81 families residing in the city. The population density was 507.8 inhabitants per square mile (196.1/km^{2}). There were 156 housing units at an average density of 305.9 per square mile (118.1/km^{2}). The racial makeup of the city was 100.0% White. Hispanic or Latino of any race were 0.4% of the population.

There were 135 households, of which 14.1% had children under the age of 18 living with them, 54.8% were married couples living together, 3.7% had a female householder with no husband present, 1.5% had a male householder with no wife present, and 40.0% were non-families. 38.5% of all households were made up of individuals, and 18.6% had someone living alone who was 65 years of age or older. The average household size was 1.92 and the average family size was 2.48.

The median age in the city was 55.9 years. 13.5% of residents were under the age of 18; 5% were between the ages of 18 and 24; 16.6% were from 25 to 44; 32.8% were from 45 to 64; and 32% were 65 years of age or older. The gender makeup of the city was 52.1% male and 47.9% female.

== Education ==
The community is served by Grinnell USD 291 public school district, and has a cooperative agreement with Wheatland USD 292 to educate high school students at Wheatland High School. The Wheatland High School mascot is a Thunderhawk. Grinnell High School was closed with the cooperative agreement.

The Grinnell Warriors won the following Kansas State High School championships:

- 1974 Boys Basketball - Class 1A
- 1976 Girls Volleyball - Class 1A
- 1979 Girls Volleyball - Class 1A
- 1981 Girls Volleyball - Class 1A
- 1982 Girls Volleyball - Class 1A
- 1985 Girls Basketball - Class 1A
- 1987 Girls Volleyball - Class 1A
- 1988 Girls Volleyball - Class 1A

== Notable people ==
- Ralph Ostmeyer, Kansas State Senator
