= Thomas County, Kansas =

County in Kansas, United States

- County
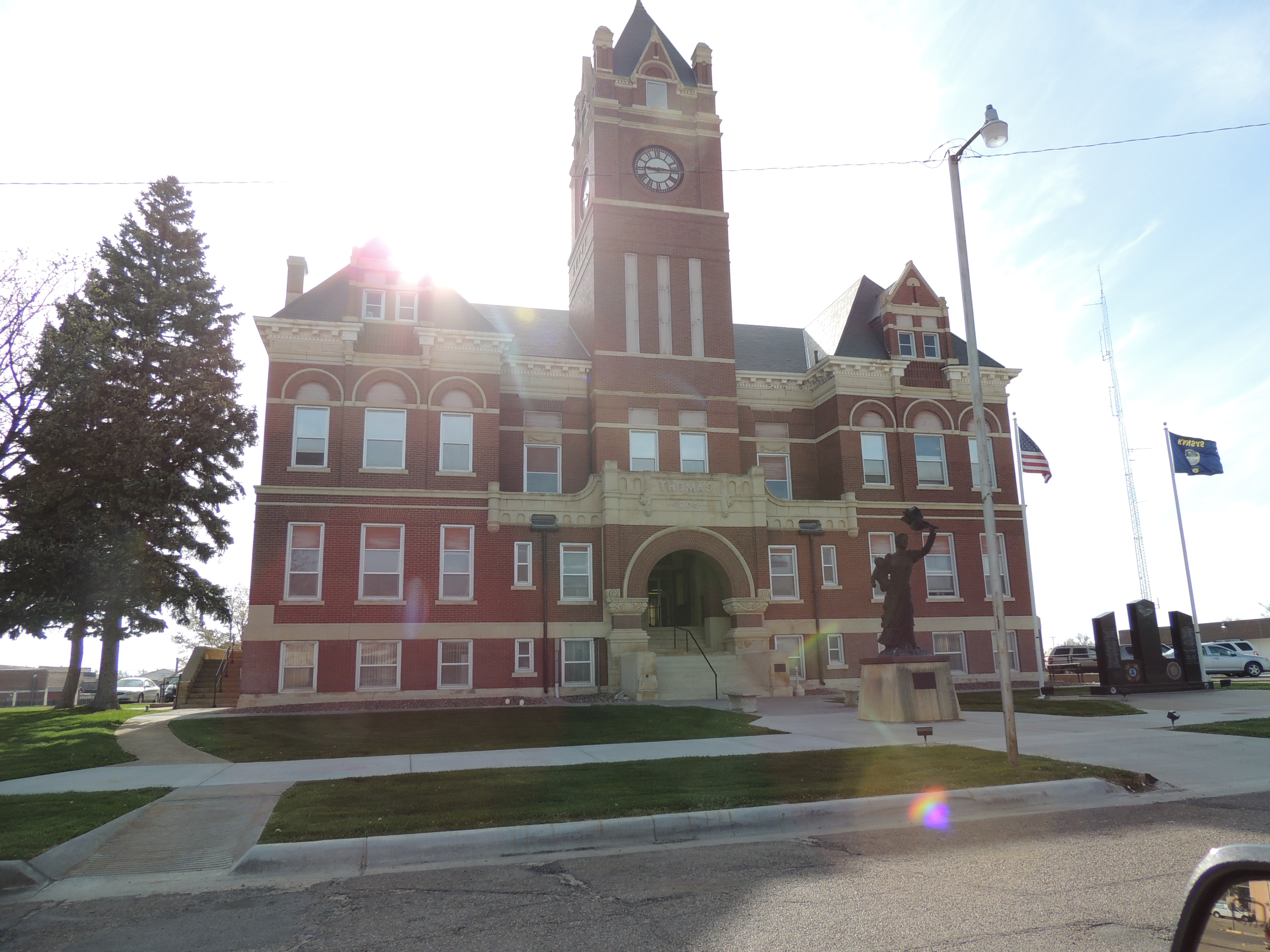
- Thomas County Courthouse in Colby (2014)

- Location within the U.S. state of Kansas
- Coordinates: 39°21′N 101°03′W
- Country: United States
- State: Kansas
- Founded: October 8, 1885
- Named for: George Henry Thomas
- Seat: Colby
- Largest city: Colby

Area
  - Total: 1,075 sq mi (2,780 km^{2})
  - Land: 1,075 sq mi (2,780 km^{2})
  - Water: 0.1 sq mi (0.26 km^{2}) 0.01%

Population (2020)
  - Total: 7,930
  - Estimate (2025): 7,725 ▼
  - Density: 7.4/sq mi (2.9/km^{2})
- Time zone: UTC−6 (Central)
  - Summer (DST): UTC−5 (CDT)
- Congressional district: 1st
- Website: thomascountyks.gov

Thomas County is a county located in the U.S. state of Kansas. Its county seat is Colby. As of the 2020 census, the county population was 7,930. The county was named after George Thomas, a Union general during the Civil War.

== History ==
=== Early history ===
For many millennia, the Great Plains of North America was inhabited by nomadic Native Americans. From the 16th century to 18th century, the Kingdom of France claimed ownership of large parts of North America. In 1762, after the French and Indian War, France secretly ceded New France to Spain, per the Treaty of Fontainebleau.

=== 19th century ===
In 1802, Spain returned most of the land to France, but keeping title to about 7,500 square miles. In 1803, most of the land for modern day Kansas was acquired by the United States from France as part of the 828,000 square mile Louisiana Purchase for 2.83 cents per acre.

In 1854, the Kansas Territory was organized, then in 1861 Kansas became the 34th U.S. state. Thomas County was founded on October 8, 1885. It was named for George Thomas, a Union general during the Civil War and hero of the Battle of Chickamauga. The townships of the county were named after the soldiers who died at the Battle of Chickamauga.

== Geography ==
According to the U.S. Census Bureau, the county has a total area of 1,075 square miles (2,780 km^{2}), of which 1,075 square miles (2,780 km^{2}) is land and 0.1 square miles (0.26 km^{2}) (0.01%) is water.

=== Major highways ===
- I-70
- US-24
- US-83
- K-25

=== Adjacent counties ===
- Rawlins County (north)
- Decatur County (northeast)
- Sheridan County (east)
- Gove County (southeast)
- Logan County (south)
- Sherman County (west/Mountain Time border)

== Demographics ==
Historical population
Census	Pop.	Note	%±
1880	161		—
1890	5,538		3,339.8%
1900	4,112		−25.7%
1910	5,455		32.7%
1920	5,517		1.1%
1930	7,334		32.9%
1940	6,425		−12.4%
1950	7,572		17.9%
1960	7,358		−2.8%
1970	7,501		1.9%
1980	8,451		12.7%
1990	8,258		−2.3%
2000	8,180		−0.9%
2010	7,900		−3.4%
2020	7,930		0.4%
2025 (est.)	7,725	▼	−2.6%
U.S. Decennial Census; 1790-1960 1900-1990; 1990-2000 2010-2020

=== 2020 census ===
As of the 2020 census, the county had a population of 7,930. The median age was 36.6 years. 23.7% of residents were under the age of 18 and 17.9% of residents were 65 years of age or older. For every 100 females there were 95.9 males, and for every 100 females age 18 and over there were 93.4 males age 18 and over.

The racial makeup of the county was 89.5% White, 1.4% Black or African American, 0.6% American Indian and Alaska Native, 0.6% Asian, 0.0% Native Hawaiian and Pacific Islander, 2.3% from some other race, and 5.6% from two or more races. Hispanic or Latino residents of any race comprised 8.0% of the population.

68.9% of residents lived in urban areas, while 31.1% lived in rural areas.

There were 3,162 households in the county, of which 30.2% had children under the age of 18 living with them and 24.2% had a female householder with no spouse or partner present. About 29.2% of all households were made up of individuals and 11.4% had someone living alone who was 65 years of age or older.

There were 3,573 housing units, of which 11.5% were vacant. Among occupied housing units, 68.8% were owner-occupied and 31.2% were renter-occupied. The homeowner vacancy rate was 1.7% and the rental vacancy rate was 14.6%.

=== 2000 census ===
As of the census of 2000, there were 8,180 people, 3,226 households, and 2,125 families residing in the county. The population density was 8 people per square mile (3.1 people/km^{2}). There were 3,562 housing units at an average density of 3 per square mile (1.2/km^{2}). The racial makeup of the county was 97.14% White, 0.43% Black or African American, 0.33% Native American, 0.27% Asian, 0.02% Pacific Islander, 0.95% from other races, and 0.86% from two or more races. 1.85% of the population were Hispanic or Latino of any race.

There were 3,226 households, out of which 32.90% had children under the age of 18 living with them, 56.10% were married couples living together, 6.90% had a female householder with no husband present, and 34.10% were non-families. 28.40% of all households were made up of individuals, and 11.70% had someone living alone who was 65 years of age or older. The average household size was 2.45 and the average family size was 3.04.

In the county, the population was spread out, with 26.30% under the age of 18, 13.50% from 18 to 24, 24.40% from 25 to 44, 21.20% from 45 to 64, and 14.60% who were 65 years of age or older. The median age was 35 years. For every 100 females there were 94.60 males. For every 100 females age 18 and over, there were 91.50 males.

The median income for a household in the county was $37,034, and the median income for a family was $45,931. Males had a median income of $33,833 versus $21,310 for females. The per capita income for the county was $19,028. About 6.60% of families and 9.70% of the population were below the poverty line, including 5.90% of those under age 18 and 7.50% of those age 65 or over.

== Government ==
=== Presidential elections ===
Thomas County is strongly Republican, and has increasingly been this way over the past few election cycles. The last time a Democratic candidate has carried Thomas County was in 1964 by Lyndon B. Johnson.

Presidential election results

United States presidential election results for Thomas County, Kansas
Year	Republican		Democratic		Third party(ies)	
Year	No.	%	No.	%	No.	%
1888	751	55.02%	486	35.60%	128	9.38%
1892	490	41.28%	0	0.00%	697	58.72%
1896	304	38.00%	490	61.25%	6	0.75%
1900	404	41.95%	551	57.22%	8	0.83%
1904	548	56.96%	205	21.31%	209	21.73%
1908	569	44.98%	630	49.80%	66	5.22%
1912	127	14.16%	432	48.16%	338	37.68%
1916	642	31.15%	1,299	63.03%	120	5.82%
1920	1,046	54.56%	747	38.97%	124	6.47%
1924	1,436	52.50%	822	30.05%	477	17.44%
1928	1,828	65.97%	899	32.44%	44	1.59%
1932	1,158	33.68%	2,103	61.17%	177	5.15%
1936	1,200	35.42%	2,168	63.99%	20	0.59%
1940	1,721	54.20%	1,423	44.82%	31	0.98%
1944	1,631	59.14%	1,097	39.78%	30	1.09%
1948	1,497	49.41%	1,476	48.71%	57	1.88%
1952	2,490	69.46%	1,069	29.82%	26	0.73%
1956	1,888	62.06%	1,138	37.41%	16	0.53%
1960	2,081	61.50%	1,285	37.97%	18	0.53%
1964	1,528	45.64%	1,793	53.55%	27	0.81%
1968	1,971	59.82%	1,074	32.59%	250	7.59%
1972	2,300	67.73%	943	27.77%	153	4.51%
1976	2,246	53.94%	1,802	43.28%	116	2.79%
1980	2,789	66.37%	1,045	24.87%	368	8.76%
1984	3,107	76.70%	887	21.90%	57	1.41%
1988	2,342	60.52%	1,408	36.38%	120	3.10%
1992	1,849	47.14%	932	23.76%	1,141	29.09%
1996	2,725	69.75%	866	22.17%	316	8.09%
2000	2,822	74.66%	807	21.35%	151	3.99%
2004	3,007	77.70%	816	21.09%	47	1.21%
2008	2,837	77.24%	787	21.43%	49	1.33%
2012	2,788	80.25%	598	17.21%	88	2.53%
2016	2,908	81.32%	473	13.23%	195	5.45%
2020	3,130	82.15%	625	16.40%	55	1.44%
2024	3,007	82.07%	597	16.29%	60	1.64%

=== Laws ===
Thomas County was a prohibition, or "dry", county until the Kansas Constitution was amended in 1986 and voters approved the sale of alcoholic liquor by the individual drink with a 30 percent food sales requirement.

== Education ==
=== Colleges ===
- Colby Community College

=== Unified school districts ===
- Brewster USD 314
- Colby USD 315
- Golden Plains USD 316

== Communities ==
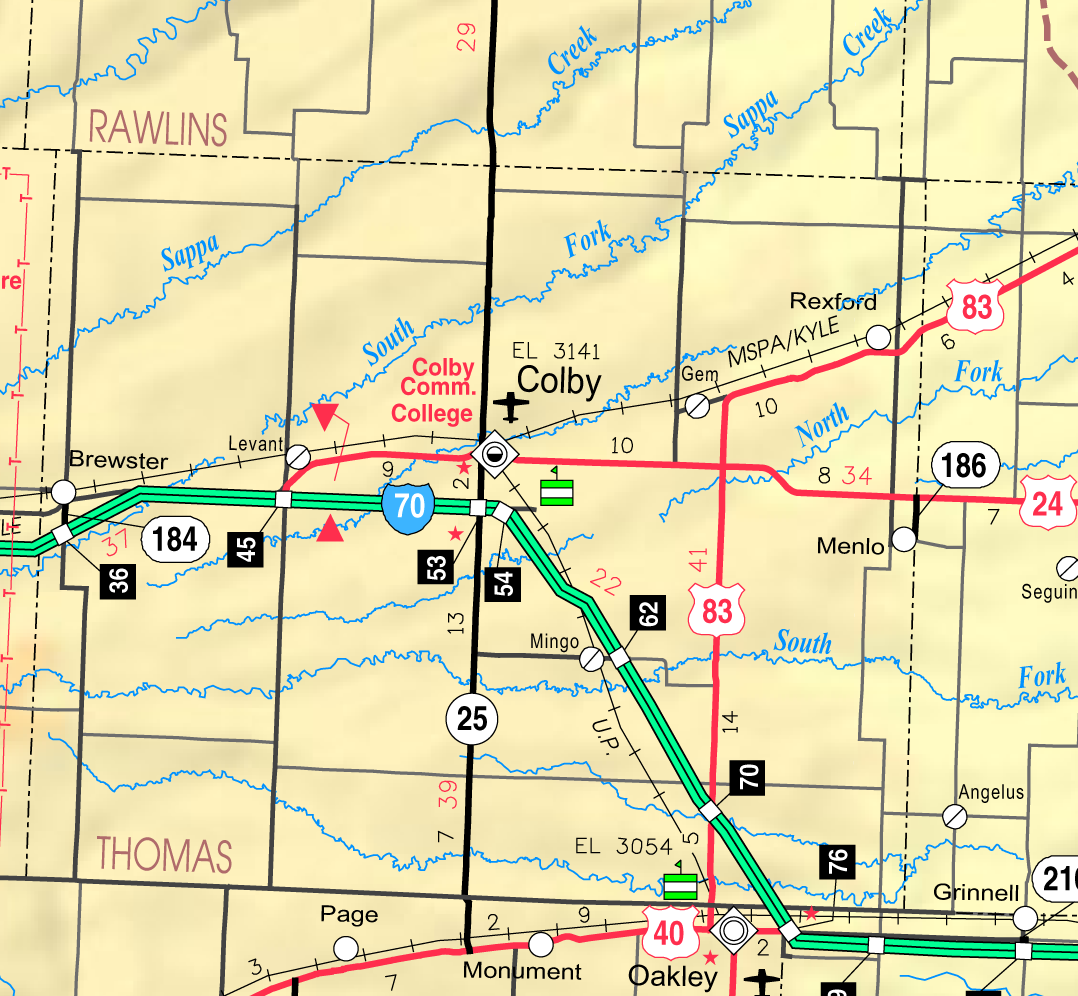
2005 map of Thomas County from KDOT (map legend)

List of townships / incorporated cities / unincorporated communities / extinct former communities within Thomas County.
‡ means a community has portions in an adjacent county. † means a community is designated a Census-Designated Place (CDP) by the United States Census Bureau.

=== Cities ===
- Brewster
- Colby (county seat)
- Gem
- Menlo
- Oakley‡
- Rexford

=== Unincorporated communities ===
- Halford
- Levant†
- Mingo

=== Ghost towns ===
- Copeland
- Cumberland
- Kuka
- Otterbourne
- Quickville

=== Townships ===
Thomas County is divided into thirteen townships. The townships were named in honor of men who were killed at the Battle of Chickamauga. The city of Colby is considered governmentally independent and is excluded from the census figures for the townships. Geographically, Colby is surrounded by Morgan Township. In the following table, the population center is the largest city (or cities) included in that township's population total, if it is of a significant size.

Sources: 2000 U.S. Gazetteer from the U.S. Census Bureau.
Township	FIPS	Population center	Population	Population density /km^{2} (/sq mi)	Land area km^{2} (sq mi)	Water area km^{2} (sq mi)	Water %	Geographic coordinates
Barrett	04325		124	0 (1)	276 (107)	0 (0)	0.01%	39°30′21″N 101°16′7″W
East Hale	19475		137	1 (3)	140 (54)	0 (0)	0%	39°22′27″N 101°12′49″W
Kingery	36925		93	0 (1)	373 (144)	0 (0)	0%	39°13′55″N 101°16′52″W
Lacey	37425	Gem	132	1 (4)	92 (36)	0 (0)	0%	39°25′48″N 100°53′27″W
Menlo	45775	Menlo	112	1 (2)	140 (54)	0 (0)	0%	39°20′36″N 100°46′4″W
Morgan	48200	Colby outskirts	755	3 (7)	271 (105)	0 (0)	0%	39°22′31″N 101°3′0″W
North Randall	51300		107	1 (2)	138 (53)	0 (0)	0.03%	39°19′44″N 100°53′55″W
Rovohl	61525		143	1 (1)	277 (107)	0 (0)	0%	39°30′11″N 101°4′3″W
Smith	65900	Rexford	213	2 (6)	93 (36)	0 (0)	0.03%	39°27′11″N 100°45′31″W
South Randall	66875	Oakley outskirts	267	1 (2)	279 (108)	0 (0)	0.04%	39°10′59″N 100°50′29″W
Summers	68975		197	1 (1)	373 (144)	0 (0)	0%	39°14′30″N 101°2′47″W
Wendell	76650		84	0 (1)	183 (71)	0 (0)	0.02%	39°31′4″N 100°49′21″W
West Hale	76975	Brewster	366	3 (7)	140 (54)	0 (0)	0%	39°21′50″N 101°21′48″W

== See also ==
Community information for Kansas

- Kansas locations by per capita income
- List of counties in Kansas
- List of townships in Kansas
- List of cities in Kansas
- List of unincorporated communities in Kansas
- List of ghost towns in Kansas
