= Grinnell Township, Kansas =

Grinnell Township
- Township
- Location in Gove County
- Coordinates: 39°03′40″N 100°41′02″W
- Country: United States
- State: Kansas
- County: Gove

Area
  - Total: 123.54 sq mi (319.98 km^{2})
  - Land: 123.50 sq mi (319.86 km^{2})
  - Water: 0.050 sq mi (0.13 km^{2}) 0.04%
- Elevation: 2,913 ft (888 m)

Population (2020)
  - Total: 406
  - Density: 3.29/sq mi (1.27/km^{2})
- GNIS feature ID: 0471305

Grinnell Township is a township in Gove County, Kansas, United States. As of the 2020 census, its population was 406.

== Geography ==
Grinnell Township covers an area of 123.55 square miles (320.0 km^{2}) and contains one incorporated settlement, Grinnell. According to the USGS, it contains one cemetery, Zion Norwegian.
