= Saint Bernard, Nebraska =

Unincorporated community in Nebraska, U.S.

Coordinates: 41°43′19″N 97°37′44″W

Saint Bernard is an unincorporated community in Platte County, Nebraska, United States.

== History ==
Saint Bernard was laid out in 1878 on behalf of Bernard Schroeder. It was originally built up chiefly by Germans.

A post office was established at Saint Bernard in 1879, and remained in operation until it was discontinued in 1906.
