= Gem, Kansas =

City in Thomas County, Kansas

- City
- Location within Thomas County and Kansas

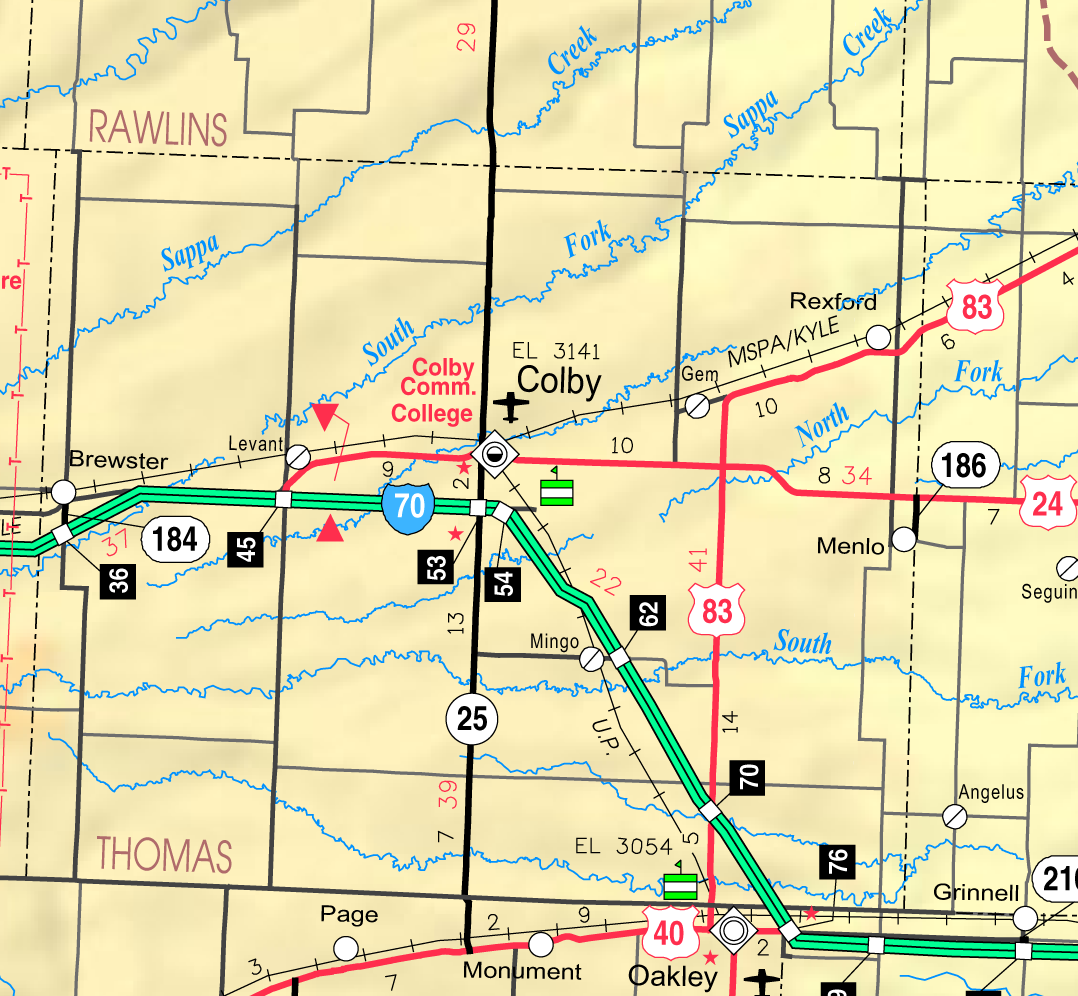
- KDOT map of Thomas County (legend)
- Coordinates: 39°25′34″N 100°53′50″W
- Country: United States
- State: Kansas
- County: Thomas
- Founded: 1880s
- Incorporated: 1926
- Named for: Gem Ranch

Area
  - Total: 0.33 sq mi (0.86 km^{2})
  - Land: 0.33 sq mi (0.86 km^{2})
  - Water: 0 sq mi (0.00 km^{2})
- Elevation: 3,091 ft (942 m)

Population (2020)
  - Total: 98
  - Density: 300/sq mi (110/km^{2})
- Time zone: UTC-6 (CST)
  - Summer (DST): UTC-5 (CDT)
- ZIP Code: 67734
- Area code: 785
- FIPS code: 20-26050
- GNIS ID: 2394870

Gem is a city in Thomas County, Kansas, United States. As of the 2020 census, the population of the city was 98.

== History ==
Gem was a shipping point on the Chicago, Rock Island and Pacific Railroad. The town was named from the Gem Ranch.

The first post office in Gem was established in 1885. It was closed in March 2014.

== Geography ==
According to the United States Census Bureau, the city has a total area of 0.33 square miles (0.85 km^{2}), all land.

== Demographics ==
Historical population
Census	Pop.	Note	%±
1930	200		—
1940	125		−37.5%
1950	118		−5.6%
1960	116		−1.7%
1970	80		−31.0%
1980	101		26.3%
1990	104		3.0%
2000	96		−7.7%
2010	88		−8.3%
2020	98		11.4%
U.S. Decennial Census

=== 2020 census ===
The 2020 United States census counted 98 people, 37 households, and 28 families in Gem. The population density was 293.4 per square mile (113.3/km^{2}). There were 38 housing units at an average density of 113.8 per square mile (43.9/km^{2}). The racial makeup was 88.78% (87) white or European American (86.73% non-Hispanic white), 1.02% (1) black or African-American, 0.0% (0) Native American or Alaska Native, 3.06% (3) Asian, 0.0% (0) Pacific Islander or Native Hawaiian, 0.0% (0) from other races, and 7.14% (7) from two or more races. Hispanic or Latino of any race was 5.1% (5) of the population.

Of the 37 households, 40.5% had children under the age of 18; 62.2% were married couples living together; 18.9% had a female householder with no spouse or partner present. 16.2% of households consisted of individuals and 5.4% had someone living alone who was 65 years of age or older. The average household size was 2.7 and the average family size was 3.1. The percent of those with a bachelor's degree or higher was estimated to be 8.2% of the population.

28.6% of the population was under the age of 18, 11.2% from 18 to 24, 28.6% from 25 to 44, 15.3% from 45 to 64, and 16.3% who were 65 years of age or older. The median age was 34.0 years. For every 100 females, there were 108.5 males. For every 100 females ages 18 and older, there were 94.4 males.

The 2016–2020 5-year American Community Survey estimates show that the median household income was $65,000 (with a margin of error of +/- $44,420) and the median family income was $80,000 (+/- $77,438). Males had a median income of $73,750 (+/- $56,867) versus $38,750 (+/- $25,098) for females. The median income for those above 16 years old was $55,625 (+/- $21,740). Approximately, 26.5% of families and 24.6% of the population were below the poverty line, including 36.6% of those under the age of 18 and 20.0% of those ages 65 or over.

=== 2010 census ===
As of the census of 2010, there were 88 people, 36 households, and 26 families residing in the city. The population density was 266.7 inhabitants per square mile (103.0/km^{2}). There were 43 housing units at an average density of 130.3 per square mile (50.3/km^{2}). The racial makeup of the city was 100.0% White.

There were 36 households, of which 33.3% had children under the age of 18 living with them, 58.3% were married couples living together, 5.6% had a female householder with no husband present, 8.3% had a male householder with no wife present, and 27.8% were non-families. 25.0% of all households were made up of individuals, and 5.6% had someone living alone who was 65 years of age or older. The average household size was 2.44 and the average family size was 2.92.

The median age in the city was 37 years. 27.3% of residents were under the age of 18; 1.1% were between the ages of 18 and 24; 31.8% were from 25 to 44; 28.3% were from 45 to 64; and 11.4% were 65 years of age or older. The gender makeup of the city was 52.3% male and 47.7% female.

=== Cemetery ===
The Gem Cemetery is on the west side of the city. Situated in the middle of the cemetery is a fenced-in area containing the headstones of the once-prominent Houston family. This family was rich in past years, when Gem was larger than it is now, but even their house has since been removed from the city.

== Education ==
The community is served by Colby USD 315 public school district.
