= Ralls High School =

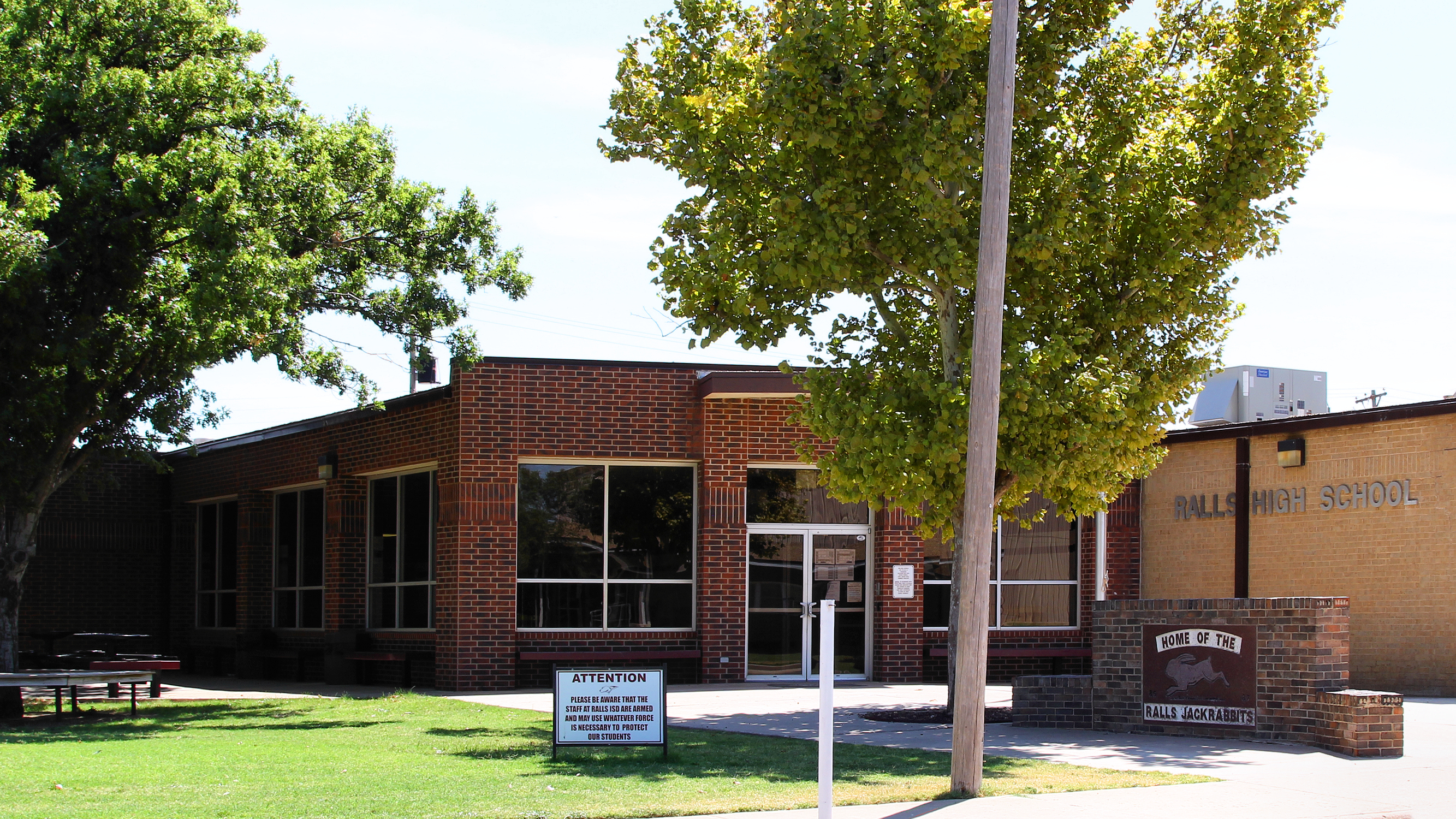

Location
- 810 Avenue I Ralls, Texas 79357; United States; 33.680640°N 101.380394°W

Information
- Superintendent: Oscar Muniz
- Principal: Kristen Brown
- Grades: 9-12
- Enrollment: 148 (2023-2024)
- Colors: Maroon and white
- Team name: Jackrabbits
- Rivals: Crosbyton
- Website: Official Website

Ralls High School is a public high school located in Ralls, Texas (USA) and classified as a 2A school by the UIL. It is part of the Ralls Independent School District located in Crosby County. In 2015, the school was rated "Met Standard" by the Texas Education Agency.

== Athletics ==
The Ralls Jackrabbits compete in the following sports:

- Baseball
- Basketball
- Cross Country
- Football
- Powerlifting
- Softball
- Track & Field
