= Tornado outbreak sequence of May 5–10, 2015 =

Weather event in the United States

Meteorological history
- Formed: May 5, 2015
- Dissipated: May 10, 2015

Tornado outbreak
- Tornadoes: 127
- Max. rating: EF3 tornado
- Duration: 5 days, 9 hours, 37 minutes
- Max. snowfall: 2 feet (24 in) near areas of Denver, Colorado

Overall effects
- Fatalities: 5 tornado-related; 2 flood-related
- Injuries: 67 tornado-related; 3 hail-related
- Damage: $1.5 billion
- Areas affected: Colorado, Iowa, Kansas, Nebraska, New Mexico, Oklahoma, South Dakota, Texas
- Part of the tornado outbreaks of 2015 and 2014–15 North American winter

The tornado outbreak sequence of May 5–10, 2015 was a six-day outbreak of tornado activity that affected the Great Plains of the United States in early May 2015. On May 6, strong tornadoes impacted the Oklahoma City area, along with rural parts of Kansas, Texas, Arkansas, South Dakota, and Nebraska. The outbreak coincided with major flooding, with large amounts of rain falling in parts of Nebraska, Kansas, Oklahoma, and Texas. The National Weather Service forecast office in Norman, Oklahoma issued a "flash flood emergency" for Oklahoma City following record-breaking rainfall that occurred in the area that evening. The outbreak sequence resulted in five tornado-related deaths, along with two flood-related deaths. A total of 127 tornadoes were confirmed and rated as a result of this outbreak sequence. Damage from the outbreak was estimated at $1.5 billion.

In addition, the system responsible for the outbreak produced a prolific winter storm in Colorado, with some areas receiving up to 2 feet (24 in) of snow.

== Meteorological synopsis ==
On May 6, a series of severe thunderstorms produced flash flooding, hail, damaging winds, and tornadoes in Oklahoma and western north Texas. In Oklahoma, this event was brought on by a shortwave moving through the area. With over 30 knots (35 mph; 56 km/h) of effective bulk shear present, moist air was being advected into the area from the southeast, and the CAPE was over 2000 J/kg. Kansas's first tornado of the day was an EF0 that developed in Lincoln County and caused minor damage at a cemetery within the town of Lincoln, Kansas. In Oklahoma, severe weather first appeared in southwestern parts of Oklahoma near Lawton, with the first Severe Thunderstorm Warning of the day being issued at 12:46 p.m. CDT and the first Tornado Warning being issued at 3:45 p.m. CDT. An EF3 tornado developed near Mount Hope, Kansas tracked through Harvey County, crossing Highway 50 west of Halstead and dissipating as it headed north, causing major tree damage and destroying a farmhouse. A long-tracked EF2 passed near Scandia, Kansas and into Nebraska, while another EF3 completely destroyed a house near Munden, Kansas. Other storms later developed in north-central parts of the Oklahoma and south of the Red River, and supercells dropped strong tornadoes in the Oklahoma City metropolitan area along with as much as 4–7 inches (100–180 mm) of rain. One of these tornadoes caused EF3 damage and several critical injuries in the southeastern part of Oklahoma City, and another EF3 struck Bridge Creek. As a result of heavy flooding, multiple Flash Flood Warnings, including a flash flood emergency, were issued for the Oklahoma City metropolitan area, and in the hours following midnight, the storms merged into a complex and maintained eastward movement. Oklahoma City recorded their 3rd wettest day on record, and wettest day on record in the month of May.

A few less intense tornadoes occurred on May 7 and May 8 across an area extending from Colorado to Texas. Another wave of significant tornado activity occurred on May 9 throughout an area extending from Nebraska to Texas. This included a large EF3 tornado that caused major damage and killed one person near Cisco, Texas.

Destructive tornado activity continued on May 10, as a high-end EF2 tornado struck the town of Delmont, South Dakota, where severe structural damage and multiple injuries occurred. Later that evening, an EF1 multiple-vortex tornado struck Lake City, Iowa, where homes were damaged, trees and power lines were downed, and the local high school had its roof torn off. Significant tornadoes continued to touch down after sunset later that night, and the town of Van, Texas was devastated by a strong EF3 tornado, where two people were killed and at least 47 others were injured. Two other fatalities occurred in Nashville, Arkansas when an EF2 tornado struck a mobile home park.

=== Winter storm side ===
The system also produced a prolific winter storm in the mountainous regions further west. It dropped snowfall up to 2 feet (24 in) in areas around Denver, in pretty much the same spots and time that a winter storm impacted a year prior. It first started spreading snow in the Sierra Mountains from May 6–9. Afterwards, it began to move northeastwards towards the High Plains. The snowstorm dumped up to 2 feet of snow in the mountains of Colorado and up to 12 inches in the lower elevations.

== Confirmed tornadoes ==
Confirmed tornadoes by Enhanced Fujita rating
EFU	EF0	EF1	EF2	EF3	EF4	EF5	Total
0	86	27	8	6	0	0	127

=== May 5 event ===
List of confirmed tornadoes – Tuesday, May 5, 2015 (Note: All dates are based on the local time zone where the tornado touched down; however, all times are in Coordinated Universal Time for consistency.)
EF#	Location	County / Parish	State	Start Coord.	Time (UTC)	Path length	Max width	Damage (2015 USD)
EF0	WSW of Roswell	Chaves	NM	33.3708°N 104.5708°W	1855 – 1856	0.15 mi (0.24 km)	15 yd (14 m)	$20,000
EF0	A cold air funnel briefly touched down, damaging the roofs and walls of two outbuildings.							
EF1	N of Big Spring to ENE of Luther	Howard	TX	32.4493°N 101.5473°W	2023 – 2050	8.12 mi (13.07 km)	150 yd (140 m)	$5,000
EF1	A couple of power poles were snapped near the base by this large stovepipe tornado.							
EF0	W of Owens	Crosby	TX	33.57°N 101.41°W	0024 – 0027	0.25 mi (0.40 km)	30 yd (27 m)	$0
EF0	A storm chaser observed a narrow tornado that touched down for three minutes in open country.							
EF0	SW of Owens to SSW of Owens	Crosby	TX	33.48°N 101.43°W	0027 – 0033	2.3 mi (3.7 km)	100 yd (91 m)	$0
EF0	The previous tornado roped out and merged with a new tornado, which crossed Texas State Highway 207. No damage was observed.							
EF0	N of Sterling City	Sterling	TX	32.032°N 101.0334°W	0059 – 0100	0.83 mi (1.34 km)	50 yd (46 m)	$0
EF0	A brief tornado touched down for about one minute on Texas State Highway 163.							
EF0	SW of Silver to SSW of Silver	Coke	TX	32.0221°N 100.7302°W	0217 – 0224	1.09 mi (1.75 km)	50 yd (46 m)	$0
EF0	A brief, intermittent tornado was reported.							

=== May 6 event ===
List of confirmed tornadoes – Wednesday, May 6, 2015
EF#	Location	County / Parish	State	Start Coord.	Time (UTC)	Path length	Max width	Damage (2015 USD)
EF0	S of Kellyville	Creek	OK	35.8656°N 96.2274°W	0758 – 0800	1.5 mi (2.4 km)	100 yd (91 m)	$0
EF0	A couple of hardwood trees were split and large tree limbs were downed.							
EF0	Lincoln	Lincoln	KS	38.9057°N 98.1893°W	1924 – 1937	10.72 mi (17.25 km)	100 yd (91 m)	$25,000
EF0	Multiple-vortex tornado. A sheet metal roof was blown across the street at a farmstead, and several trees were snapped at a cemetery in town.							
EF0	ENE of Apache	Caddo	OK	34.89°N 98.3159°W	1945 – 1947	2 mi (3.2 km)	50 yd (46 m)	$0
EF0	Trees were damaged by this tornado.							
EF0	NW of Cyril	Caddo	OK	34.9409°N 98.2499°W	1953 – 1955	0.5 mi (0.80 km)	50 yd (46 m)	$0
EF0	A tornado was broadcast on live television via news helicopter. It remained over open fields and caused no damage.							
EF0	WSW of Ionia	Jewell	KS	39.6351°N 98.4373°W	2031 – 2034	1 mi (1.6 km)	25 yd (23 m)	$0
EF0	Tornado remained over open country, causing no damage.							
EF2	W of Mankato to N of Burr Oak	Jewell	KS	39.7781°N 98.3652°W	2055 – 2121	12.58 mi (20.25 km)	350 yd (320 m)	$1,500,000
EF2	At least four homes sustained damage to their roofs, windows, or siding, including one that had a large section of its roof removed. A garage was destroyed, with inside vehicles moved 30–50 ft (9.1–15.2 m). Other outbuildings, trees, power poles, and trees were damaged or destroyed.							
EF1	Roseland	Adams	NE	40.4321°N 98.5591°W	2118 – 2128	3.87 mi (6.23 km)	300 yd (270 m)	$1,500,000
EF1	High-end EF1 tornado moved directly through town. Several homes and outbuildings sustained damage, of which two houses sustained considerable damage. One of those two homes was unanchored and slid off of its foundation, while the second lost its entire roof structure. A large metal building with wood post frame construction was destroyed. Widespread tree damage was observed, irrigation pivots were damaged, and a train car was derailed as well.							
EF3	E of Amber to NNE of Bridge Creek	Grady	OK	35.1576°N 97.8032°W	2133 – 2226	10.3 mi (16.6 km)	1,500 yd (1,400 m)	Unknown
EF3	A large multiple-vortex wedge tornado caused significant damage to numerous homes and other structures in Bridge Creek. Trees and power poles were snapped, mobile homes were completely destroyed, and frame homes were heavily damaged, a few of which lost roofs and exterior walls. One poorly anchored frame home was leveled, and vehicles from some residences were tossed over 100 yards away. A total of 1,500 homes and mobile home were damaged by the tornado, including 200 that were severely damaged or destroyed. Outbuildings were destroyed as well.							
EF0	S of Ringwood	Major	OK	36.3076°N 98.25°W	2137 – 2138	0.1 mi (0.16 km)	20 yd (18 m)	$0
EF0	Brief tornado remained over open country, causing no damage.							
EF1	S of Bostwick to SSW of Nelson	Nuckolls	NE	40.0105°N 98.1705°W	2138 – 2154	9.47 mi (15.24 km)	200 yd (180 m)	$250,000
EF1	Pivots were overturned, power poles were snapped, and trees were damaged. A home sustained damage to its porch.							
EF2	ENE of Webber, KS to NW of Deshler, NE	Jewell (KS), Republic (KS), Nuckolls (NE)	KS, NE	39.9476°N 97.9662°W	2148 – 2219	20.12 mi (32.38 km)	400 yd (370 m)	$4,250,000
EF2	Large wedge tornado. Numerous pivots were overturned, power poles were snapped, and widespread tree damage occurred. A few buildings sustained minor damage in the town of Hardy, Nebraska. Several outbuildings and grain bins were damaged or destroyed, and a few homes lost portions of their roofs in rural areas as well.							
EF0	E of Amber	Grady	OK	35.1877°N 97.7982°W	2148	0.3 mi (0.48 km)	50 yd (46 m)	$0
EF0	A storm chaser observed a satellite tornado in conjunction with the previous EF3 tornado east of Amber.							
EF3	SSE of Mount Hope to NE of Burrton	Sedgwick, Harvey	KS	37.8404°N 97.6507°W	2149 – 2217	16.48 mi (26.52 km)	300 yd (270 m)	$630,000
EF3	Three center pivot irrigation systems were damaged. At one farmstead, a single car detached garage was damaged and a carport was ripped from a barn. At a second farmstead, an unanchored home was leveled and swept from its foundation, another home sustained significant damage, and a barn was rendered a complete loss. A small hog barn had its roof ripped off. Numerous large trees were snapped and sustained some debarking.							
EF1	E of Formoso	Jewell	KS	39.7484°N 97.9644°W	2154 – 2204	4.28 mi (6.89 km)	250 yd (230 m)	$250,000
EF1	A home sustained roof, window, and siding damage, tree and power line damage was observed, and an outbuildings was destroyed.							
EF1	SE of Randall	Jewell	KS	39.583°N 97.9497°W	2204 – 2210	3.11 mi (5.01 km)	60 yd (55 m)	$5,000
EF1	Damage was confined to trees along the path.							
EF1	NNW of Courtland	Republic	KS	39.814°N 97.93°W	2208 – 2215	2.13 mi (3.43 km)	75 yd (69 m)	Unknown
EF1	The first of a pair of twin tornadoes was reported by storm chasers. Damage was minor.							
EF0	N of Courtland	Republic	KS	39.8563°N 97.8952°W	2210 – 2215	3.15 mi (5.07 km)	50 yd (46 m)	Unknown
EF0	The second of twin tornadoes was reported by storm chasers. Little to no damage occurred.							
EF0	SSW of Carrier	Garfield	OK	36.4533°N 98.0338°W	2215	0.1 mi (0.16 km)	10 yd (9.1 m)	$0
EF0	Brief tornado remained over open country, causing no damage.							
EF2	S of Courtland, KS to SE of Hebron, NE	Republic (KS), Thayer (NE)	KS, NE	39.6838°N 97.8974°W	2220 – 2319	36.24 mi (58.32 km)	800 yd (730 m)	$1,000,000
EF2	Large wedge tornado. An ethanol plant and a home sustained EF2 damage near Scandia, Kansas, while a feedlot and several other houses were impacted less severely. The tornado crossed into Nebraska and passed near Chester, damaging trees, power poles, grain bins, irrigation pivots, and partially blowing the roof off of a house.							
EF0	W of Carleton	Thayer	NE	40.2767°N 97.7467°W	2226 – 2230	1.79 mi (2.88 km)	100 yd (91 m)	$500,000
EF0	A few train cars and irrigation pivots were overturned.							
EF0	NNW of Byron	Thayer	NE	40.013°N 97.7821°W	2228 – 2231	1.04 mi (1.67 km)	30 yd (27 m)	$0
EF0	Tornado remained over open country, causing no damage.							
EF1	Southeastern Newcastle	McClain	OK	35.2202°N 97.5783°W	2233 – 2239	1 mi (1.6 km)	200 yd (180 m)	Unknown
EF1	Two outbuildings lost their roofs or were destroyed.							
EF0	N of Viola	Sedgwick	KS	37.56°N 97.63°W	2238 – 2240	0.32 mi (0.51 km)	50 yd (46 m)	$0
EF0	Brief tornado remained over open country, causing no damage.							
EF0	W of Grand Island	Hall	NE	40.9107°N 98.4406°W	2245	0.01 mi (0.016 km)	25 yd (23 m)	$0
EF0	A trained storm spotter reported a brief tornado.							
EF0	Western Norman	McClain	OK	35.233°N 97.5344°W	2246 – 2247	0.5 mi (0.80 km)	25 yd (23 m)	Unknown
EF0	Damage to trees and fencing was observed in the outskirts of Norman.							
EF1	Northwestern Norman	Cleveland	OK	35.2453°N 97.4974°W	2253 – 2310	3.25 mi (5.23 km)	1,000 yd (910 m)	Unknown
EF1	Large rain-wrapped tornado. Numerous trees, fences, and power poles were damaged. Several homes had their roofs damaged. HVAC equipment was damaged and light poles were downed at a hospital. A hotel sustained damage to its exterior.							
EF0	ESE of Seiling	Dewey	OK	36.0946°N 98.7545°W	2333	0.3 mi (0.48 km)	30 yd (27 m)	$0
EF0	Tornado remained over open country, causing no damage.							
EF0	NNW of Verden	Caddo	OK	35.1228°N 98.13°W	2341 – 2349	3.5 mi (5.6 km)	200 yd (180 m)	$0
EF0	Large, potentially significant tornado remained over open country, causing no damage.							
EF0	SSW of Wakita	Grant	OK	36.8131°N 97.9546°W	2356 – 2357	0.3 mi (0.48 km)	20 yd (18 m)	$0
EF0	A storm chaser observed a brief tornado.							
EF3	S of Munden	Republic	KS	39.8584°N 97.5478°W	0014 – 0017	1.87 mi (3.01 km)	100 yd (91 m)	Unknown
EF3	A farmhouse was swept away by this brief but high-end EF3 tornado, with mature trees on the property snapped and debarked. Debris from the house was tossed northeast upward of 100–200 yd (91–183 m). The house was bolted to its foundation, but the two vehicles parked at the residence were only slightly moved, and close inspection revealed that explosive failure of the home's attached garage caused the entire structure to disintegrate, preventing a rating higher than EF3.							
EF0	SW of Narka	Republic	KS	39.9513°N 97.4436°W	0028	0.01 mi (0.016 km)	50 yd (46 m)	$0
EF0	Tree limbs were downed by this brief, weak tornado.							
EF0	SW of Anthony	Harper	KS	37.09°N 98.12°W	0035 – 0036	0.25 mi (0.40 km)	50 yd (46 m)	$0
EF0	Brief tornado remained over open country, causing no damage.							
EF1	N of Norway	Republic	KS	39.7119°N 97.7802°W	0038 – 0044	2.38 mi (3.83 km)	75 yd (69 m)	$0
EF1	Tornado caused damage to grain bins.							
EF0	SE of Tuttle	Grady	OK	35.2534°N 97.7779°W	0049 – 0051	0.5 mi (0.80 km)	40 yd (37 m)	Unknown
EF0	Two homes sustained minor damage and trees were uprooted. Some damage was reported at the Tiger Safari Zoological Park.							
EF0	E of Tuttle to NNE of Bridge Creek	Grady	OK	35.2977°N 97.741°W	0111 – 0121	3.5 mi (5.6 km)	200 yd (180 m)	$0
EF0	Damage was confined to trees along the path.							
EF1	NE of Jamestown	Cloud	KS	39.5388°N 97.444°W	0133 – 0134	0.25 mi (0.40 km)	75 yd (69 m)	$0
EF1	Outbuildings were damaged by the tornado.							
EF0	S of Minneapolis	Ottawa	KS	39.0601°N 97.7064°W	0138	0.02 mi (0.032 km)	50 yd (46 m)	$0
EF0	Tornado remained over open country, causing no damage.							
EF3	Southeastern Oklahoma City	Oklahoma	OK	35.4061°N 97.4769°W	0141 – 0148	2 mi (3.2 km)	700 yd (640 m)	Unknown
EF3	A strong tornado touched down in the southeastern part of Oklahoma City just north of Valley Brook, severely damaging an RV park, a mobile home park, a hotel, and several self-storage units. Numerous walls on the second floor of the hotel were collapsed, and a few frame homes were damaged as well. Multiple vehicles were flipped and at least 12 people were injured, some critically.							
EF2	NNW of Archer City	Archer	TX	33.6434°N 98.7318°W	0149 – 0225	12 mi (19 km)	400 yd (370 m)	Unknown
EF2	Transmission lines were downed by this tornado.							
EF0	NNW of Wells	Ottawa	KS	39.1756°N 97.5607°W	0155	0.25 mi (0.40 km)	50 yd (46 m)	$0
EF0	Tornado remained over open country, causing no damage.							
EF0	SW of Morrowville	Washington	KS	39.785°N 97.2698°W	0210 – 0219	6.04 mi (9.72 km)	50 yd (46 m)	$0
EF0	Weak tornado caused minor tree damage.							
EF0	NE of Aurora	Cloud	KS	39.3941°N 97.4673°W	0227 – 0241	8.8 mi (14.2 km)	75 yd (69 m)	$0
EF0	Weak tornado damaged tree limbs.							
EF0	W of Throckmorton	Throckmorton	TX	33.183°N 99.3198°W	0237 – 0248	3.39 mi (5.46 km)	440 yd (400 m)	$0
EF0	Large tornado remained over an open field, causing no damage.							
EF1	E of Clyde	Washington	KS	39.5963°N 97.3324°W	0256 – 0305	4.05 mi (6.52 km)	75 yd (69 m)	Unknown
EF1	Tornado downed several power poles.							
EF0	WNW of Throckmorton	Throckmorton	TX	33.25°N 99.34°W	0300 – 0305	1.18 mi (1.90 km)	100 yd (91 m)	$0
EF0	Tornado remained over open country, causing no damage.							
EF0	NW of Washington	Washington	KS	39.8474°N 97.0883°W	0336 – 0337	0.25 mi (0.40 km)	75 yd (69 m)	$0
EF0	Brief tornado remained over open country, causing no damage.							
EF1	NW of Cortland to WSW of Holland	Gage, Lancaster	NE	40.5058°N 96.7087°W	0349 – 0359	7.67 mi (12.34 km)	500 yd (460 m)	$0
EF1	Outbuildings, trees, and sheds sustained minor damage. The roofs of homes on farmsteads were damaged, and high-tension power lines were downed.							
EF0	NW of Elbert	Throckmorton	TX	33.3129°N 99.0496°W	0400 – 0401	0.01 mi (0.016 km)	50 yd (46 m)	$0
EF0	Tornado remained over an open field, causing no damage.							

=== May 7 event ===
List of confirmed tornadoes – Thursday, May 7, 2015
EF#	Location	County / Parish	State	Start Coord.	Time (UTC)	Path length	Max width	Damage (2015 USD)
EF0	NW of Copeland	Haskell	KS	37.5998°N 100.6801°W	2045 – 2055	0.48 mi (0.77 km)	50 yd (46 m)	$0
EF0	The first of five landspout tornadoes was reported by an emergency manager. It remained over open country and caused no damage.							
EF0	NNE of Copeland	Gray	KS	37.6081°N 100.588°W	2100 – 2105	0.25 mi (0.40 km)	50 yd (46 m)	$0
EF0	The second of five landspout tornadoes was reported by an emergency manager. It remained over open country and caused no damage.							
EF0	WNW of Montezuma	Gray	KS	37.618°N 100.5596°W	2100 – 2106	0.19 mi (0.31 km)	50 yd (46 m)	$0
EF0	The third of five landspout tornadoes was reported by an emergency manager. It remained over open country and caused no damage.							
EF0	NNE of Copeland	Gray	KS	37.6201°N 100.54°W	2101 – 2105	0.19 mi (0.31 km)	50 yd (46 m)	$0
EF0	The fourth of five landspout tornadoes was reported by an emergency manager. It remained over open country and caused no damage.							
EF1	NE of Copeland	Gray	KS	37.6042°N 100.5349°W	2102 – 2108	0.24 mi (0.39 km)	50 yd (46 m)	$40,000
EF1	The final of five landspout tornadoes caused EF1 damage to well-built building, tractor, and home.							
EF1	SE of Walsh	Baca	CO	37.0839°N 102.1137°W	2259 – 2301	0.25 mi (0.40 km)	50 yd (46 m)	$3,000
EF1	A windmill was damaged by this tornado.							
EF0	S of Fort Lupton	Weld	CO	40.04°N 104.81°W	0036	0.1 mi (0.16 km)	50 yd (46 m)	$0
EF0	Brief tornado remained over open country, causing no damage.							
EF1	N of Rhome	Wise	TX	—N/a	2345 – 2353	3.37 mi (5.42 km)	200 yd (180 m)	$250,000
EF1	Two mobile homes were destroyed while twelve others were damaged by this large multiple-vortex tornado. Several power poles and power lines were damaged.							
EF1	W of Krum to NW of Sanger	Denton	TX	—N/a	0045 – 0105	12.7 mi (20.4 km)	500 yd (460 m)	$210,000
EF1	Several barns sustained substantial damage, and several homes had their roofs damaged by this large multiple-vortex tornado. A metal storage tank was lifted and thrown into a high tension power line, causing the steel beams to collapse. Open farm and ranch land was damaged.							
EF0	NNW of Runaway Bay	Wise	TX	—N/a	0200 – 0202	0.29 mi (0.47 km)	50 yd (46 m)	$0
EF0	A few trees sustained minimal damage.							

=== May 8 event ===
List of confirmed tornadoes – Friday, May 8, 2015
EF#	Location	County / Parish	State	Start Coord.	Time (UTC)	Path length	Max width	Damage (2015 USD)
EF0	WNW of Vernon	Wilbarger	TX	—N/a	2122	0.3 mi (0.48 km)	30 yd (27 m)	$0
EF0	Brief tornado remained over open country, causing no damage.							
EF1	SW of Vernon	Wilbarger	TX	—N/a	2128 – 2136	3.5 mi (5.6 km)	100 yd (91 m)	$0
EF1	Trees and the roof of a metal building were damaged by this tornado.							
EF0	NNE of Haynesville	Wichita	TX	—N/a	2221	0.3 mi (0.48 km)	50 yd (46 m)	$0
EF0	A metal outbuilding sustained minor damage.							
EF0	E of O'Brien	Haskell	TX	33.3809°N 99.7859°W	2230 – 2231	0.19 mi (0.31 km)	35 yd (32 m)	$0
EF0	Brief tornado remained over open country, causing no damage.							
EF0	W of Randlett	Cotton	OK	—N/a	2304	0.2 mi (0.32 km)	50 yd (46 m)	$0
EF0	Road signs were damaged by this tornado.							
EF0	ESE of Randlett	Cotton	OK	—N/a	2316	0.2 mi (0.32 km)	50 yd (46 m)	$0
EF0	Brief tornado remained over open country, causing no damage.							
EF0	NW of Throckmorton	Throckmorton	TX	33.31°N 99.34°W	2322 – 2323	0.25 mi (0.40 km)	35 yd (32 m)	$0
EF0	Brief tornado remained over open country, causing no damage.							
EF0	W of Waurika	Jefferson	OK	—N/a	2340	0.5 mi (0.80 km)	50 yd (46 m)	$0
EF0	Brief tornado crossed U.S. Route 70, causing no damage.							
EF0	NW of Throckmorton	Throckmorton	TX	33.19°N 99.19°W	2340 – 2341	0.19 mi (0.31 km)	25 yd (23 m)	$0
EF0	Brief tornado remained over open country, causing no damage.							
EF0	E of Waurika	Jefferson	OK	—N/a	0008	0.2 mi (0.32 km)	50 yd (46 m)	$0
EF0	Brief tornado remained over open country, causing no damage.							
EF0	S of La Junta	Otero	CO	37.8953°N 103.575°W	0012 – 0014	0.82 mi (1.32 km)	50 yd (46 m)	$0
EF0	Brief tornado remained over open country, causing no damage.							

=== May 9 event ===
List of confirmed tornadoes – Saturday, May 9, 2015
EF#	Location	County / Parish	State	Start Coord.	Time (UTC)	Path length	Max width	Damage (2015 USD)
EF3	NE of Nimrod to SSE of Cisco	Eastland	TX	32.3032°N 99.0133°W	2132–2152	3.79 mi (6.10 km)	1,400 yd (1,300 m)	$400,000
EF3	1 death – A large stovepipe tornado destroyed several homes near Cisco, including one that was leveled. An unanchored hunting lodge was swept completely away, and numerous trees were denuded and partially debarked as well. A large concrete power pole was snapped, and vehicles and farm equipment were tossed more than 1 mi (1.6 km). An elderly woman was killed in the destruction of her mobile home, and one other person was critically injured.							
EF0	S of Karval	Lincoln	CO	38.53°N 103.50°W	2140	0.01 mi (0.016 km)	50 yd (46 m)	$0
EF0	Brief tornado remained over open country, causing no damage.							
EF0	W of Truckton	El Paso	CO	38.715°N 104.325°W	2141–2146	3.32 mi (5.34 km)	100 yd (91 m)	$0
EF0	Tornado remained over open fields, causing no damage.							
EF0	NNE of Lindsay	Cooke	TX	33.69°N 97.21°W	2155–2157	0.68 mi (1.09 km)	40 yd (37 m)	$0
EF0	A brief tornado remained over open country, causing no damage.							
EF0	SE of Eads	Kiowa	CO	38.43°N 102.69°W	2227–2235	1.07 mi (1.72 km)	50 yd (46 m)	$0
EF0	Large cone tornado remained over open fields, causing no damage.							
EF0	S of Matheson	Elbert	CO	39.04°N 103.95°W	2230	0.1 mi (0.16 km)	50 yd (46 m)	$0
EF0	Brief tornado remained over open country, causing no damage.							
EF0	E of Thackerville	Love	OK	33.79°N 97.1226°W	2230	0.3 mi (0.48 km)	30 yd (27 m)	$0
EF0	A brief tornado caused minor tree damage.							
EF0	ENE of Matheson	Elbert	CO	39.22°N 103.84°W	2240	0.1 mi (0.16 km)	50 yd (46 m)	$0
EF0	A brief tornado remained over open country, causing no damage.							
EF0	N of Chivington	Kiowa, Cheyenne	CO	38.5613°N 102.6073°W	2250–2306	11.06 mi (17.80 km)	150 yd (140 m)	$0
EF0	Tornado remained over open fields, though it caused some damage to fencing.							
EF0	SE of Marietta	Love	OK	33.8684°N 97.0337°W	2250	0.3 mi (0.48 km)	30 yd (27 m)	$0
EF0	A brief tornado caused minor tree damage.							
EF0	WNW of Burkburnett	Wichita	TX	34.11°N 98.63°W	2257–2304	3.25 mi (5.23 km)	50 yd (46 m)	$0
EF0	Tornado remained over open fields, causing no damage.							
EF0	W of Randlett	Cotton	OK	34.18°N 98.53°W	2309–2311	1 mi (1.6 km)	100 yd (91 m)	$0
EF0	A stovepipe tornado remained over open country, causing no damage.							
EF0	N of Willis	Marshall	OK	33.92°N 96.83°W	2324–2330	3 mi (4.8 km)	200 yd (180 m)	$0
EF0	A stovepipe tornado remained over open country, causing no damage.							
EF0	SSE of Firstview	Cheyenne	CO	38.7834°N 102.512°W	2335–2338	1.04 mi (1.67 km)	25 yd (23 m)	$0
EF0	Intermittent tornado remained over open country, causing no damage.							
EF0	NE of Huckabay	Erath	TX	32.35°N 98.35°W	2358–2359	0.29 mi (0.47 km)	80 yd (73 m)	$0
EF0	Tornado remained over open country, causing no damage.							
EF1	SSW of Silo to ENE of Durant	Bryan	OK	34.0266°N 96.4867°W	0025–0035	5.25 mi (8.45 km)	200 yd (180 m)	Unknown
EF1	Two homes, including one mobile home, were damaged and numerous trees were downed.							
EF0	N of Collyer	Trego	KS	39.0617°N 100.1198°W	0028–0040	3.95 mi (6.36 km)	100 yd (91 m)	$0
EF0	Tornado remained over open fields, causing no damage.							
EF0	SSW of Saint Peter	Graham	KS	39.14°N 100.12°W	0055–0106	2.8 mi (4.5 km)	50 yd (46 m)	$0
EF0	Tornado remained over open country, causing no damage.							
EF0	NE of Monument Rocks	Gove	KS	38.86°N 100.69°W	0100–0115	5.67 mi (9.12 km)	100 yd (91 m)	$0
EF0	Tornado remained over open fields, causing no damage.							
EF0	N of Elk City	Beckham, Roger Mills	OK	40.24°N 99.54°W	0124–0126	2.01 mi (3.23 km)	100 yd (91 m)	$0
EF0	Some trees and a cattle feeder were damaged by this tornado.							
EF0	E of Stamford	Harlan	NE	40.13°N 99.5501°W	0125–0127	0.28 mi (0.45 km)	15 yd (14 m)	$0
EF0	A brief tornado remained over open country, causing no damage.							
EF0	E of Oxford	Harlan	NE	40.24°N 99.54°W	0136	0.01 mi (0.016 km)	15 yd (14 m)	$0
EF0	A brief tornado remained over open country, causing no damage.							
EF1	S of Grinnell	Gove	KS	38.86°N 100.69°W	0138–0158	6.07 mi (9.77 km)	50 yd (46 m)	$50,000
EF1	Tornado caused minor roof damage and overturned irrigation pivots along its path.							
EF0	ENE of Angelus to ESE of Rexford	Sheridan	KS	38.86°N 100.69°W	0212–0250	13.88 mi (22.34 km)	150 yd (140 m)	$0
EF0	Tornado remained over open fields, causing no damage.							
EF2	NE of Menlo to ESE of Rexford	Sheridan, Decatur	KS	39.41°N 100.68°W	0250–0328	18.75 mi (30.18 km)	150 yd (140 m)	$75,000
EF2	Multiple-vortex tornado remained mainly over open country, though relatively minor damage took place near Selden and a barn elsewhere was destroyed.							
EF1	WSW of Oberlin to SSE of Traer	Decatur	KS	39.80°N 100.62°W	0343–0404	11.74 mi (18.89 km)	50 yd (46 m)	$6,000
EF1	Tornado remained mainly over open country, but snapped multiple power poles along its path.							
EF0	SSW of McCook	Red Willow	NE	40.11°N 100.65°W	0420–0430	4.22 mi (6.79 km)	25 yd (23 m)	$0
EF0	Intermittent tornado remained over open country, causing no damage.							

=== May 10 event ===
List of confirmed tornadoes – Sunday, May 10, 2015
EF#	Location	County / Parish	State	Start Coord.	Time (UTC)	Path length	Max width	Damage (2015 USD)
EF1	SE of McAlester Regional Airport	Pittsburg	OK	34.8727°N 95.7721°W	1401–1404	3.8 mi (6.1 km)	200 yd (180 m)	$35,000
EF1	A tornado destroyed a barn, rolled a horse trailer, and toppled a grain silo.							
EF2	E of Wagner to N of Delmont	Charles Mix, Douglas	SD	43.092°N 98.232°W	1521–1553	16.16 mi (26.01 km)	400 yd (370 m)	$1,500,000
EF2	A high-end EF2 tornado struck Delmont directly. South of town, a house had its roof torn off and outbuildings were destroyed. Within Delmont, at least 20 structures were heavily damaged or destroyed, including a large church, the fire department, and several homes. A few small and frail cottage-type homes were leveled or swept away, and trees were snapped and stripped of foliage. Farm fields were scoured north of town before the tornado dissipated. Nine people were injured.							
EF0	WNW of Dimock	Hutchinson, Davison	SD	43.49°N 98.08°W	1615–1623	4.18 mi (6.73 km)	50 yd (46 m)	$0
EF0	Tornado remained over open fields, causing no damage.							
EF1	N of Argyle to Denton	Denton	TX	33.132°N 97.183°W	1916–1926	5.19 mi (8.35 km)	150 yd (140 m)	$3,500,000
EF1	Numerous trees were snapped or uprooted. A home sustained damage to its roof, siding, awning, and gutters. One fast food restaurant had a significant portion of its roof removed while a second had its entire roofing structure ripped off. A small outbuilding was overturned. One mobile home had its underpinning removed while three others were slid off their foundations and two others had shingles removed.							
EF0	Krugerville	Denton	TX	33.2769°N 96.9836°W	1939–1941	2.9 mi (4.7 km)	75 yd (69 m)	$60,000
EF0	Tornado touched down in Krugerville, causing minor damage before moving over mostly open fields. A farmstead sustained some damage outside of town.							
EF0	S of Inwood	Sioux	IA	43.24°N 96.45°W	2028–2030	0.85 mi (1.37 km)	50 yd (46 m)	$0
EF0	Tornado touched down over an open field and caused no damage.							
EF1	SW of Carpenter's Bluff	Grayson	TX	33.67°N 96.40°W	2108–2116	2.6 mi (4.2 km)	100 yd (91 m)	$50,000
EF1	Damage was mainly confined to trees, though one church near Carpenter's Bluff sustained roof damage.							
EF1	SE of Shive	Hamilton	TX	31.5612°N 98.234°W	2245–2252	5.1 mi (8.2 km)	105 yd (96 m)	$100,000
EF1	Several groves of trees, outbuildings, and houses were damaged. One home had a majority of its roof removed and thrown into a field approximately 2 mi (3.2 km) downstream.							
EF0	WNW of Peoria	Hill	TX	31.9874°N 97.2682°W	2303–2305	0.6 mi (0.97 km)	50 yd (46 m)	$0
EF0	A brief tornado caused minor damage to farmland.							
EF0	NNW of Cottonwood	Kaufman	TX	32.48°N 96.4°W	2307	0.1 mi (0.16 km)	20 yd (18 m)	$0
EF0	Brief tornado remained over open country, causing no damage.							
EF0	ESE of Jumbo	Pushmataha	OK	34.4223°N 95.711°W	2318–2321	1.7 mi (2.7 km)	100 yd (91 m)	$0
EF0	Tornado remained over open country, causing no damage.							
EF0	NW of Post Oak Bend City	Kaufman	TX	32.65°N 96.33°W	2334	0.05 mi (0.080 km)	50 yd (46 m)	$0
EF0	Brief tornado remained over open fields, causing no damage.							
EF1	S of Lake City to N of Rockwell City	Carroll, Calhoun	IA	42.1467°N 94.8402°W	0010–0100	23.34 mi (37.56 km)	700 yd (640 m)	$1,025,000
EF1	South of Lake City, trees and power poles were snapped. The multi-vortex tornado then struck the city directly, tearing the roofs off of a manufactured home and the local high school. An apartment building lost a section of its roof, and trees in town were damaged. North of town, a grain bin and a camper were flipped over, and chicken houses were damaged. The tornado snapped power poles and damaged another grain bin near Rockwell City before dissipating.							
EF0	ESE of Canova	Miner	SD	43.86°N 97.39°W	0016–0017	0.35 mi (0.56 km)	50 yd (46 m)	$0
EF0	A brief tornado remained over open country, causing no damage.							
EF2	S of Wilburton to WSW of Red Oak	Latimer	OK	34.7649°N 95.3112°W	0018–0041	15 mi (24 km)	880 yd (800 m)	$100,000
EF2	A tornado moved through heavily forested areas, flattening a large swath of trees. Outbuildings were damaged, a house was moved off of its foundation, and another house lost much of its roof. An oil drilling platform was damaged, and a large plastic storage tank was tossed. Two metal storage buildings were damaged as well.							
EF0	NE of Brandon	Hill	TX	32.0526°N 96.9653°W	0020–0030	1.42 mi (2.29 km)	150 yd (140 m)	$50,000
EF0	Tornado remained over fields and caused crop damage.							
EF0	NW of Red Oak	Latimer	OK	34.9692°N 95.0984°W	0046–0052	3.7 mi (6.0 km)	75 yd (69 m)	$0
EF0	Large tree limbs were snapped by this weak tornado.							
EF0	WSW of Manson	Calhoun	IA	42.5192°N 94.5794°W	0114–0116	1.03 mi (1.66 km)	400 yd (370 m)	$0
EF0	A brief tornado caused minor damage in rural areas.							
EF3	N of Edom to N of Van	Van Zandt	TX	32.41°N 95.62°W	0146–0209	10.22 mi (16.45 km)	700 yd (640 m)	$40,000,000
EF3	2 deaths – A significant tornado began south of Van and moved north directly though town. Numerous homes and mobile homes were damaged or destroyed, and many trees and power lines were downed throughout Van. A school building in town sustained major roof damage, and a nearby metal-frame industrial building was destroyed. A few well-built frame homes in the northern part of town were left with only interior walls standing. An oil pump derrick toppled to the ground, along with a large metal high-tension truss tower. Several barns and outbuildings were destroyed as well. At least 47 people were injured.							
EF1	NNW of Garden Valley (1st tornado)	Smith	TX	32.6348°N 95.5807°W	0219–0220	1.44 mi (2.32 km)	440 yd (400 m)	$125,000
EF1	Several homes sustained roof damage, outbuildings were damaged or destroyed, and numerous trees were snapped and uprooted.							
EF1	NNW of Garden Valley (2nd tornado)	Smith	TX	32.6129°N 95.5761°W	0350–0351	1.09 mi (1.75 km)	450 yd (410 m)	$125,000
EF1	Several outbuildings were damaged or destroyed, and numerous trees were snapped and uprooted.							
EF2	Western Nashville	Howard	AR	33.9311°N 93.8659°W	0418–0434	6.7 mi (10.8 km)	400 yd (370 m)	$1,500,000
EF2	2 deaths – A strong tornado impacted a mobile home park in the western part of town, completely destroying five mobile homes, killing two occupants, and resulting in eight injuries. Numerous trees were snapped or uprooted, and power lines were downed as well. Approximately 40 to 60 homes sustained minor to moderate damage, mainly from fallen trees.							
EF0	NNW of Stalls	Marion	TX	32.8357°N 94.3114°W	0425–0427	0.28 mi (0.45 km)	172 yd (157 m)	$0
EF0	Numerous softwood trees were uprooted and numerous large tree limbs were downed.							
EF0	SW of Lodi	Marion, Cass	TX	32.8643°N 94.2865°W	0428–0432	2.64 mi (4.25 km)	345 yd (315 m)	$0
EF0	Numerous softwood and hardwood trees were uprooted.							

== Tigernado ==
On the evening of May 6, an EF0 tornado caused damage at the Tiger Safari Zoological Park located near Tuttle in Grady County, Oklahoma. An EF3 and two other EF0 tornadoes also occurred close to the attraction that evening. Due to the reported damage, Grady County was under strict warnings regarding the possibility that the tigers, and other creatures, might have gotten out of their habitats. Bo Wright, a web designer from Oklahoma, heard of the storms and possibly free-roaming predators, and thought instantly of the movie Sharknado and decided to design a false movie poster and T-shirt as a joke. Locals referred to the event as the "Tigernado" on social media, and memes began to circulate the internet. Tigernado is a portmanteau up of "tiger" and "tornado".

=== Timeline for Grady County ===
Time (CST)	Event	Refs
1:30 PM	Flash flood warnings and tornado watches are declared to last until 9 AM and 2 AM the next day, respectively.	
3:33 PM	1500 yard wide EF3 tornado starts east of Amber, OK, and travels 10.3 miles before dissipating to the east of Tiger Safari.	
3:48 PM	An EF0 satellite tornado spins off of the initial EF3 tornado that was reported, but it lasts less than a minute before dissipating. No damage occurs as a result of this tornado.	
6:49 PM	An EF0 tornado starts southeast of Tuttle, downing trees and causing damage to two homes and the Tiger Safari Zoological Park.	
7:11 PM	Another EF0 tornado touches down east north east of Tuttle, damaging trees and crossing the path of the initial EF3.	
9:50 PM	Precautionary warnings begin circulation for residences in Grady County about the possibility of exotic animals, from Tiger Safari, being loose.	
10:09 PM	The Grady County Sheriff's Office declares that all animals are accounted for at Tiger Safari.	
11:28 AM (May 7)	The Grady County Sheriff's Office states that no animals were ever loose at any point. Damages are assessed.	

=== Tigernado T-shirt Fundraiser ===
Seeing this popularity, Wright decided to sell the T-shirts for $20 each and donate the money directly to Serve Moore, a nonprofit organization dedicated to helping victims of natural disasters.

=== Park damage ===
The park director, Bill Meadows, estimated the total damages, including those from the wind, flooding, and debris, to be around $50,000. This total also includes the damage to the enclosure of an American black bear named Smokey. Smokey's habitat sustained considerable damage in the storm, and the bear had to be transferred to the Garold Wayne Zoo during the rebuilding of his enclosure. Though his fences were damaged, his fear of the storms kept him hunkered down like the other creatures. Neither he, nor any of the others, were actually roaming loose.

== See also ==
- List of North American tornadoes and tornado outbreaks
- Tornado outbreak of March 24–27, 2023 – Another outbreak that included a tornado striking and damaging a wild animal safari in Georgia
