= Cone, Texas =

- Unincorporated community
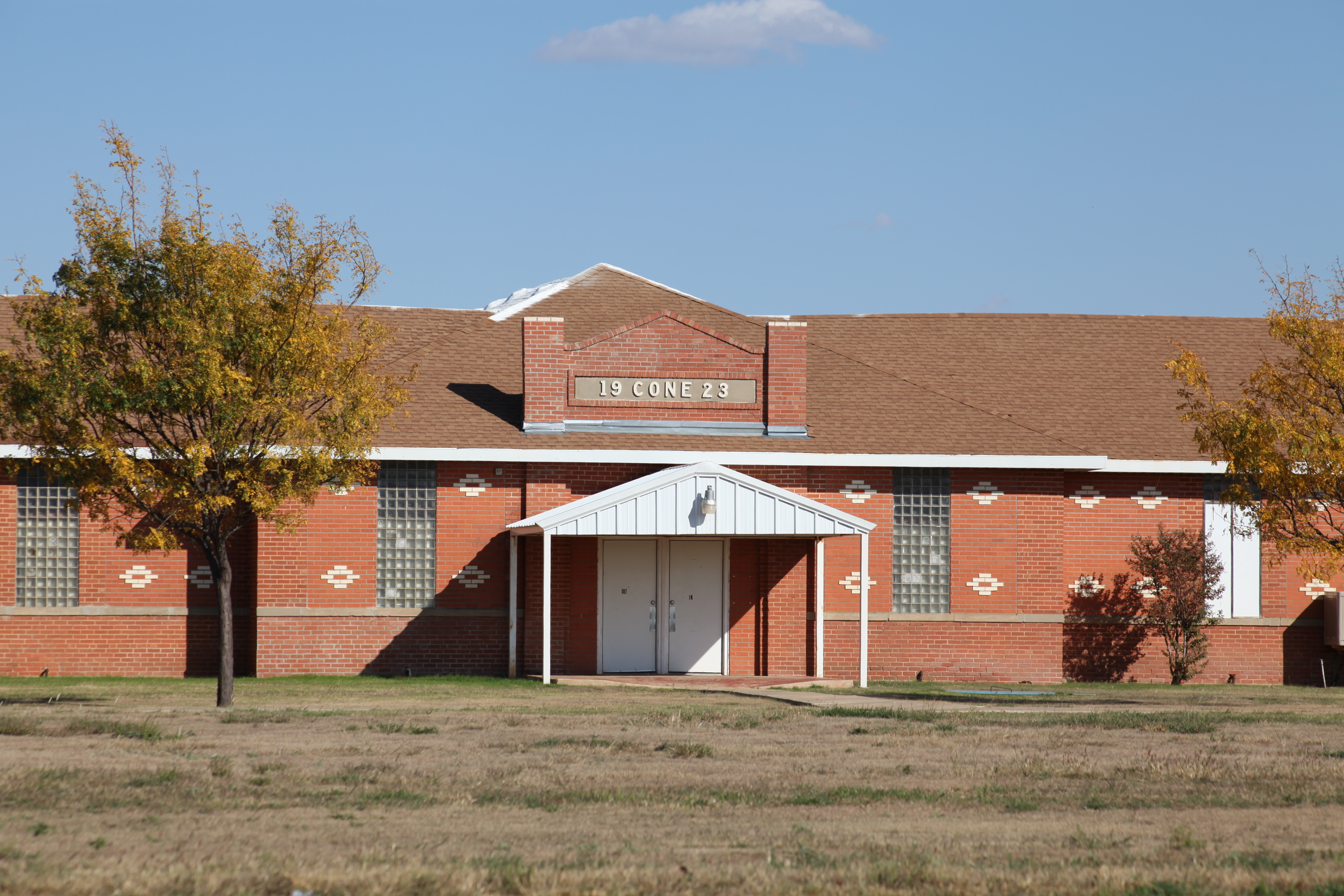
- Cone school built in 1923

- Location within Texas Location within the United States
- Coordinates: 33°47′50″N 101°23′16″W
- Country: United States
- State: Texas
- County: Crosby
- Region: Llano Estacado
- Established: 1901
- Elevation: 3,130 ft (950 m)

Population (2000 est.)
  - Total: 20
- Time zone: UTC-6 (Central (CST))
  - Summer (DST): UTC-5 (CDT)
- ZIP code: 79357
- Area code: 806
- GNIS feature ID: 1354866
- Website: Handbook of Texas

Cone is an unincorporated community in Crosby County, Texas, United States. According to the Handbook of Texas, the community had a population of 70 in 2000. Cone is part of the Lubbock metropolitan area.

== History ==
The settlement was named for early settler James Stanton Cone and was founded in 1901. A post office was established two years later. Cone had 150 residents in 1939, then began its decline not long after. The community had 50 residents served by three businesses and the post office in 1988. It went up to 70 in 2000. J.S. Cone worked as a mail carrier and brought mail from nearby Emma. The post office was established in R.E. Chapman's general store; he also became the first postmaster. It also had stores and churches for some time. It is now a shipping point for cotton, sorghum, grains, and wheat. Cone has a cemetery.

On May 24, 1957, an F3 tornado dissipated east of Cone after causing damage in other parts of the area.

== Geography ==
Cone is located at the intersection of U.S. Route 62 and Farm to Market Road 193, 19 mi (31 km) northwest of Crosbyton, 34 mi (55 km) northeast of Lubbock, 8.5 mi (13.7 km) north of Ralls, 14 mi (23 km) south of Floydada, and 41 mi (66 km) southeast of Plainview in Crosby County.

== Education ==
"Uncle" Charlie Travis was given a land grant for a school and the Cone School District was established on February 14, 1905. It joined the Ralls Independent School District in 1965. It was also home to Harmony Plains Singing school.
