= Crosbyton High School =

Location
- 204 South Harrison Avenue; Crosbyton, Texas 79322; United States; 33.658890°N 101.247484°W

Information
- Superintendent: Shawn Mason
- Principal: Glen Hill
- Teaching staff: 30.48 (FTE)
- Grades: K-12
- Enrollment: 308 (2023-2024)
- Student to teacher ratio: 10.10
- Colors: Purple and gold
- Team name: Chiefs
- Website: Official Website

Crosbyton High School, also known as Crosbyton Secondary, is a public high school located in Crosbyton, Texas (USA) and classified as a 2A school by the UIL. It is part of the Crosbyton Consolidated Independent School District located in Crosby County. In 2015, the school was rated "Met Standard" by the Texas Education Agency.

== Athletics ==
The Crosbyton Chiefs compete in the following sports:

- Baseball
- Basketball
- Cross Country
- Football
- Golf
- Softball
- Tennis
- Track & Field
