= Broadway, Crosby County, Texas =

- Unincorporated community
- Location within Texas Location within the United States
- Coordinates: 33°42′13″N 101°4′21″W
- Country: United States
- State: Texas
- County: Crosby
- Elevation: 3,009 ft (917 m)
- Time zone: UTC-6 (Central (CST))
  - Summer (DST): UTC-5 (CDT)
- Area code: 806
- GNIS feature ID: 1352913

Broadway is an unincorporated community in Crosby County, Texas, United States. According to the Handbook of Texas, the community had a population of 20 in 2000. It is located within the Lubbock metropolitan area.

== Geography ==
Broadway is located at the intersection of U.S. Route 82 and Farm to Market Road 836, 45 mi (72 km) east of Lubbock in eastern Crosby County.

== Education ==
Today, the community is served by the Crosbyton Consolidated Independent School District.
