= Marcos Hinojos Sr. =

American football coach (born c. 1968)

Marcus Hinojos Sr.
Current position
- Title: Head coach
- Team: Wayland Baptist
- Conference: SAC
- Record: 12–17

Biographical details
- Born: c. 1968 (age 57–58); Lorenzo, Texas, U.S.
- Education: Eastern New Mexico University (1991)

Playing career
- 1986–1991: Eastern New Mexico
- Position: Middle linebacker

Coaching career (HC unless noted)
- 1992–?: Lorenzo HS (TX) (OC)
- ?: Fort Stockton HS (TX) (DC)
- ?–2007: Kermit HS (TX) (DC)
- 2008–2012: Plainview HS (TX)
- 2013: S. H. Rider HS (TX) (DC)
- 2014: Coronado HS (TX) (DC)
- 2015: Wayland Baptist (LB)
- 2016–2022: Wayland Baptist (DC)
- 2023–present: Wayland Baptist

Administrative career (AD unless noted)
- 2008–2012: Plainview HS (TX)

Head coaching record
- Overall: 12–17 (college); 10–40 (high school)

Marcos Hinojos Sr. (born c. 1968) is an American college football coach. He is the head football coach for Wayland Baptist University, a position he has held since 2023. He was the head football coach for Plainview High School from 2008 to 2012. He also coached for Lorenzo High School, Fort Stockton High School, Kermit High School, S. H. Rider High School, and Coronado High School. He played college football for Eastern New Mexico as a middle linebacker.

== Head coaching record ==
=== College ===
| Year | Team | Overall | Conference | Standing | Bowl/playoffs |
|---|---|---|---|---|---|
Wayland Baptist Pioneers (Sooner Athletic Conference) (2023–present)
| 2023 | Wayland Baptist | 2–8 | 1–7 | T–8th | |
| 2024 | Wayland Baptist | 4–6 | 3–5 | T–6th | |
| 2025 | Wayland Baptist | 6–3 | 5–3 | 4th | |
| 2026 | Wayland Baptist | 0–0 | 0–0 | | |
| Wayland Baptist: | | 12–17 | 9–15 | | |
| Total: | | 12–17 | | | |

=== High school ===
| Year | Team | Overall | Conference | Standing | Bowl/playoffs |
|---|---|---|---|---|---|
Plainview Bulldogs () (2008–2012)
| 2008 | Plainview | 2–8 | 0–5 | 6th | |
| 2009 | Plainview | 2–8 | 0–5 | 6th | |
| 2010 | Plainview | 1–9 | 1–6 | 8th | |
| 2011 | Plainview | 2–8 | 0–7 | 8th | |
| 2012 | Plainview | 3–7 | 1–4 | 5th | |
| Plainview: | | 10–40 | 2–27 | | |
| Total: | | 10–40 | | | |
