= Ralls, Texas =

- City
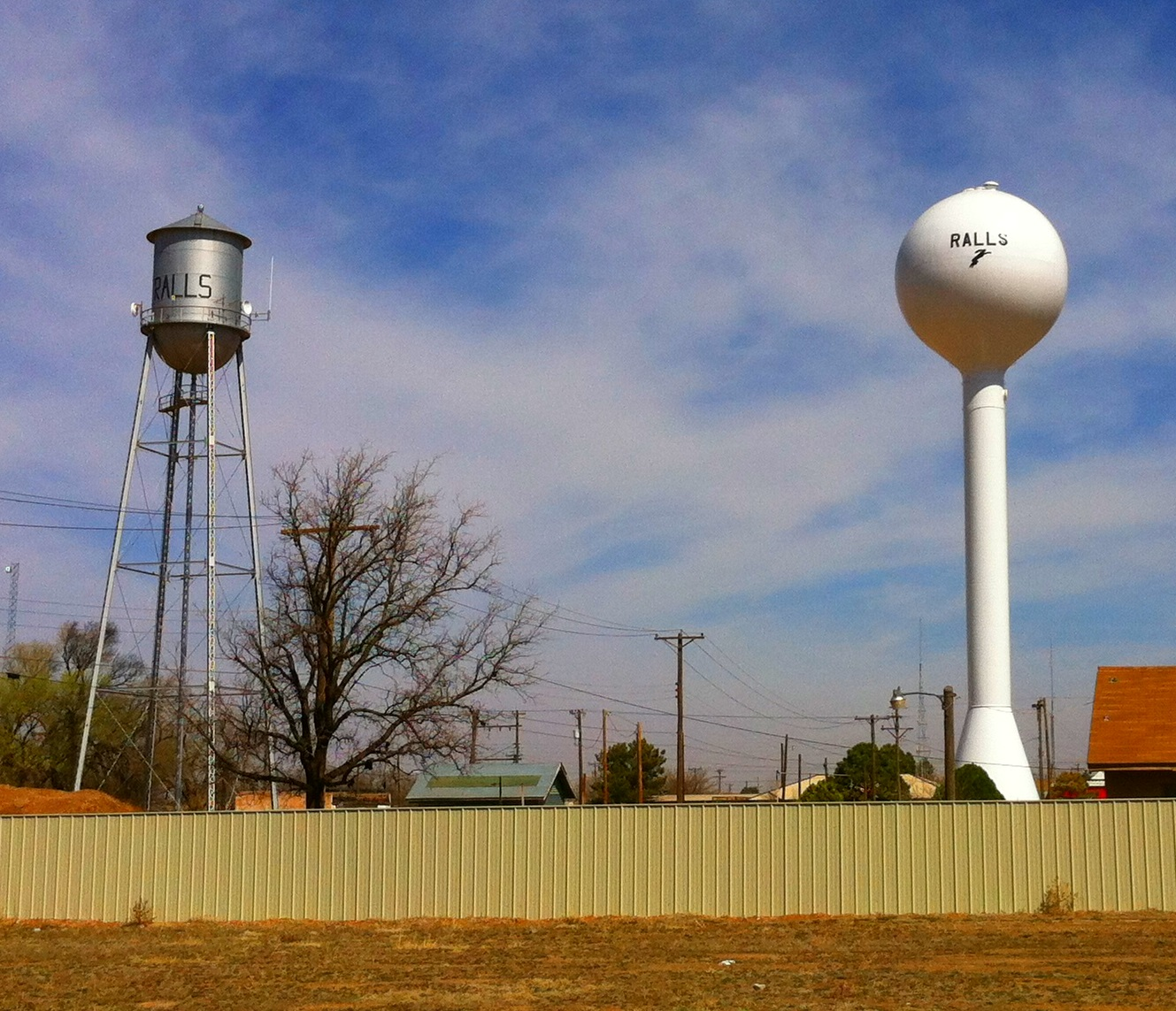
- Water towers in Ralls

- Location within Texas
- Coordinates: 33°40′46″N 101°23′01″W
- Country: United States
- State: Texas
- County: Crosby
- Region: Llano Estacado
- Established: 1911
- Founder: John Robinson Ralls

Area
  - Total: 1.35 sq mi (3.49 km^{2})
  - Land: 1.35 sq mi (3.49 km^{2})
  - Water: 0 sq mi (0.00 km^{2})
- Elevation: 3,107 ft (947 m)

Population (2020)
  - Total: 1,665
  - Density: 1,240/sq mi (477/km^{2})
- Time zone: UTC-6 (CST)
  - Summer (DST): UTC-5 (CDT)
- ZIP code: 79357
- Area code: 806
- FIPS code: 48-60356
- GNIS feature ID: 2411512
- Website: https://www.rallstx.org/

Ralls is a city in Crosby County, Texas, United States. It was named after John Robinson Ralls, who with the help of W.E. McLaughlin, laid out the townsite in July 1911. As of the 2020 census, it had a population of 1,665, down from 1,944 at the 2010 census. Ralls is surrounded by productive farmlands that primarily produce cotton and grains, with lesser amounts of soybean, sunflower seed, and vegetables.

== Geography ==
Ralls is an agricultural community located on the level plains of the Llano Estacado between Lorenzo to the west and Crosbyton to the east. To the north of Ralls is the small community of Cone, and further north is a narrow portion of Blanco Canyon, where Spanish explorer Vazquez and his army are believed to have camped in 1541. To the south of Ralls is the Caprock Escarpment, which marks the break between the Llano Estacado and the Rolling Plains, carved by tributaries of the Brazos River, such as the Salt Fork and the Double Mountain Fork.

According to the United States Census Bureau, Ralls has a total area of 1.4 square miles (3.5 km^{2}), all land.

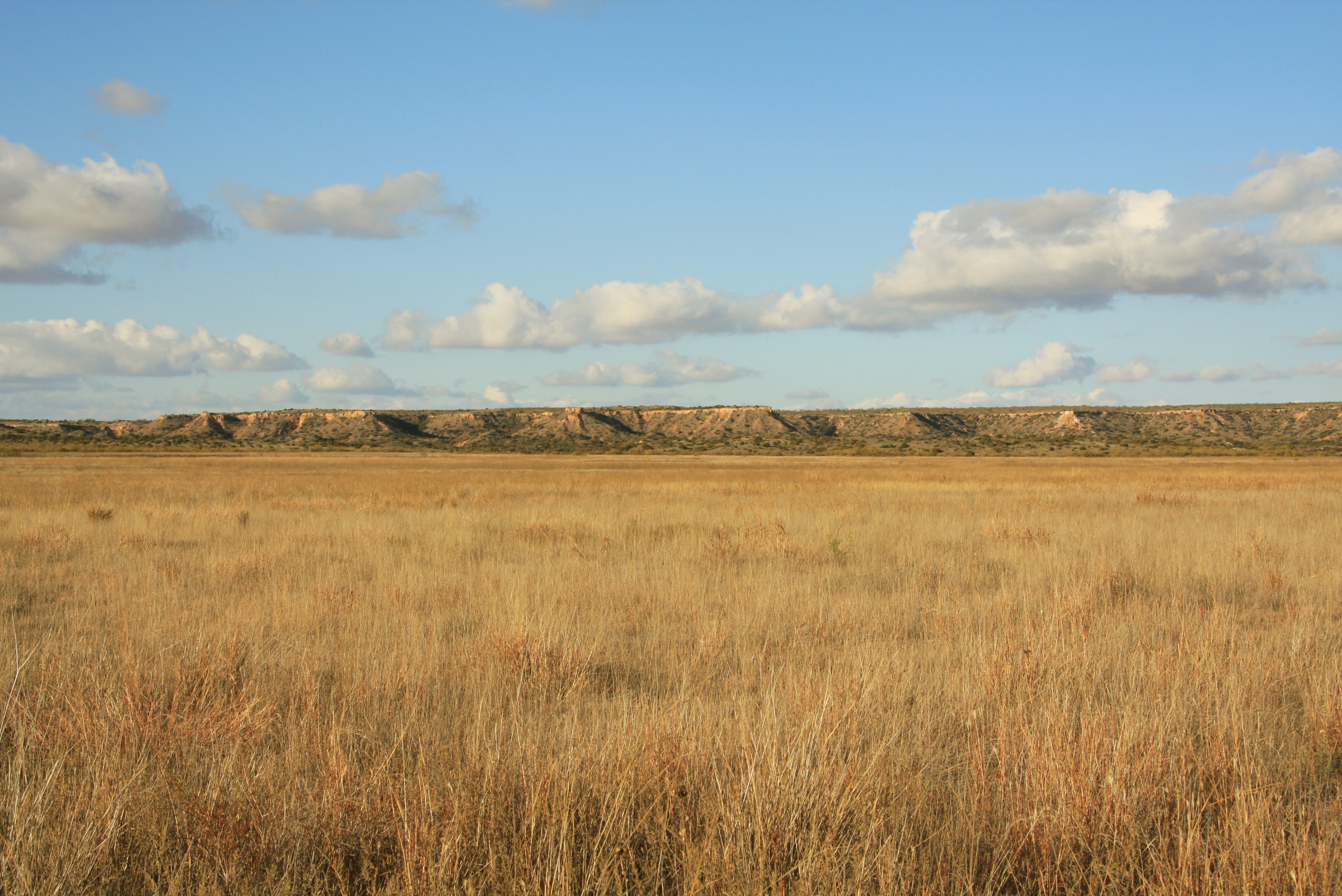
The Caprock Escarpment of the Llano Estacado, 22 km (14 mi) south of Ralls

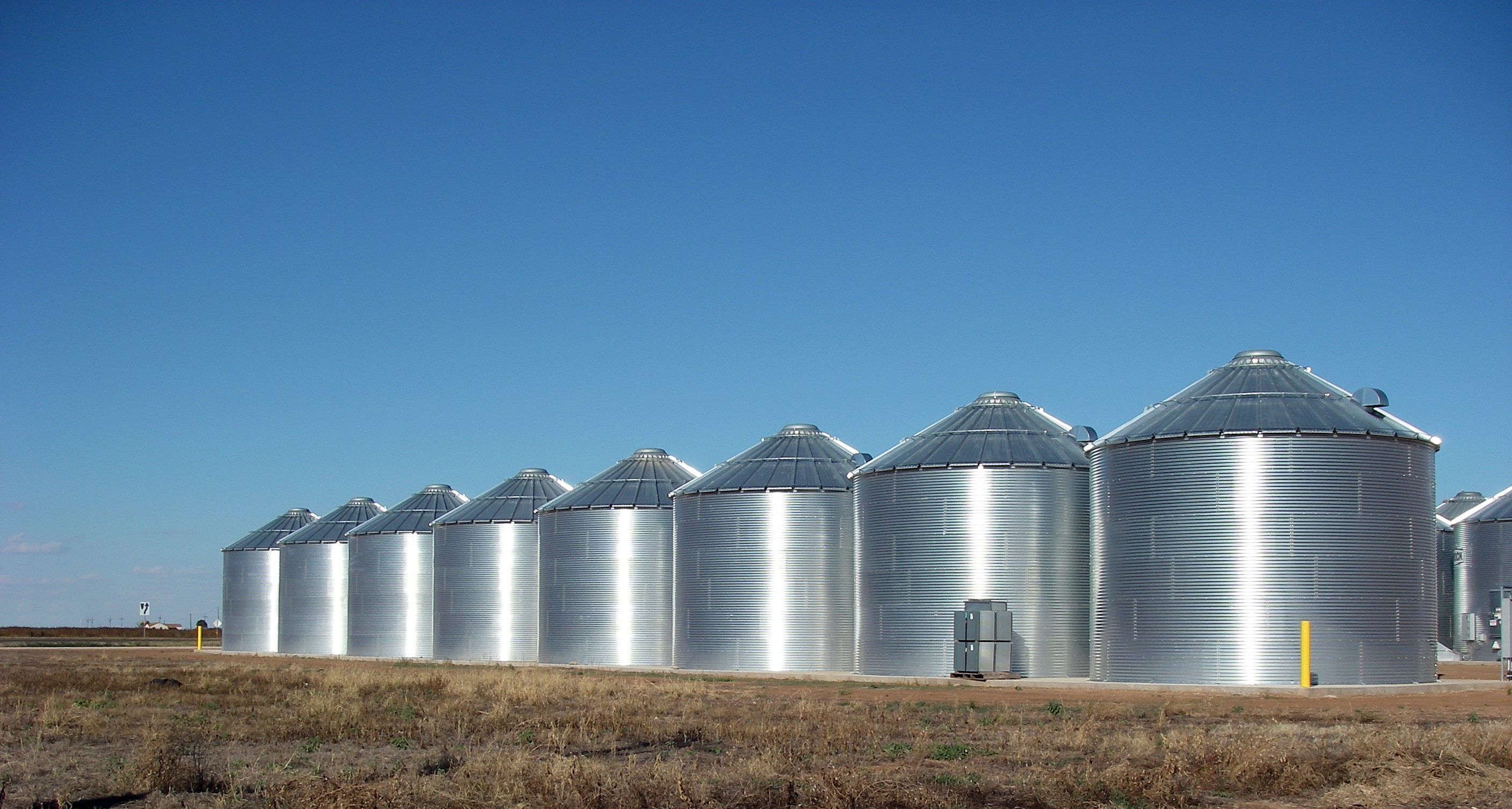
Grain silos along the west side of Ralls

== Demographics ==
Historical population
Census	Pop.	Note	%±
1930	1,365		—
1940	1,512		10.8%
1950	1,779		17.7%
1960	2,229		25.3%
1970	1,962		−12.0%
1980	2,422		23.4%
1990	2,172		−10.3%
2000	2,252		3.7%
2010	1,944		−13.7%
2020	1,665		−14.4%
U.S. Decennial Census

=== 2020 census ===
As of the 2020 United States census, 1,665 people and 423 families resided in the city.

The median age was 39.9 years; 26.0% of residents were under the age of 18 and 18.8% of residents were 65 years of age or older. For every 100 females there were 97.3 males, and for every 100 females age 18 and over there were 92.5 males age 18 and over.

There were 614 households in Ralls, of which 34.5% had children under the age of 18 living in them. Of all households, 44.8% were married-couple households, 19.1% were households with a male householder and no spouse or partner present, and 29.3% were households with a female householder and no spouse or partner present. About 25.4% of all households were made up of individuals and 13.5% had someone living alone who was 65 years of age or older.

There were 736 housing units, of which 16.6% were vacant. The homeowner vacancy rate was 0.0% and the rental vacancy rate was 14.2%.

0.0% of residents lived in urban areas, while 100.0% lived in rural areas.

Racial composition as of the 2020 census
Race	Number	Percent
White	939	56.4%
Black or African American	26	1.6%
American Indian and Alaska Native	6	0.4%
Asian	8	0.5%
Native Hawaiian and Other Pacific Islander	0	0.0%
Some other race	420	25.2%
Two or more races	266	16.0%
Hispanic or Latino (of any race)	1,072	64.4%

=== 2000 census ===
Ralls is part of the Lubbock metropolitan statistical area. According to the United States Census Bureau, its population was 2,252 in 2000, with 776 households, and 584 families residing in the community. The population density was 1,680.4 inhabitants per square mile (648.8/km^{2}). The 871 housing units averaged 649.9 per square mile (251.0/km^{2}). The racial makeup of the city was 58.48% White, 2.22% African American, 0.53% Native American, 36.77% from other races, and 2.00% from two or more races. Hispanics or Latinos of any race were 55.77% of the population.

Of the 776 households, 38.7% had children under 18 living with them, 57.6% were married couples living together, 13.4% had a female householder with no husband present, and 24.7% were not families. About 22.6% of all households were made up of individuals, and 15.2% had someone living alone who was 65 or older. The average household size was 2.86 and the average family size was 3.37.

In the city, the age distribution was 32.7% under 18, 7.8% from 18 to 24, 23.9% from 25 to 44, 18.6% from 45 to 64, and 16.9% who were 65 or older. The median age was 33 years. For every 100 females, there were 87.4 males. For every 100 females age 18 and over, there were 80.8 males.

The median income for a household in the city was $23,892, and for a family was $26,739. Males had a median income of $23,750 versus $15,724 for females. The per capita income for the city was $10,557. About 25.3% of families and 28.6% of the population were below the poverty line, including 34.8% of those under age 18 and 27.2% of those age 65 or over.

== Notable people ==
- Hal Bynum, country music songwriter, was born in Ralls
- Billy Walker, country musician, and member of the Grand Ole Opry, was born in Ralls

== Education ==
The city is served by the Ralls Independent School District.

== See also ==
- Canyon Valley, Texas
- Estacado, Texas
