= Lorenzo Independent School District =

School district in Texas

Coordinates: 33.6721°N 101.5331°W

Lorenzo Independent School District is a public school district based in Lorenzo, Texas (USA).

Located in Crosby County, a small portion of the district extends into Lubbock County.

Lorenzo ISD has two campuses –

- Lorenzo High School (Grades 7-12
- Lorenzo Elementary School (Grades PK-6)

In 2009, the school district was rated "academically acceptable" by the Texas Education Agency.

== Notable alumni ==
San Francisco 49ers quarterback Joe Reed attended Lorenzo High.

== Special programs ==
=== Athletics ===
Lorenzo High School plays six-man football.

== See also ==
- List of school districts in Texas
