= Hinojos (surname) =

Hinojos is a Spanish surname. Notable people with the surname include:

- Blas de Hinojos, military commander of New Mexico
- Lucinda Hinojos (born 1981), American visual artist and muralist
- Marcos Hinojos Sr. (born 1968), American college football coach
- Paul Hinojos (born 1975), American musician

== See also ==
- Marisma de Hinojos, a salt marsh about 50 km north of the city of Cadiz
- Hinojo, Spanish surname
