= Canyon Valley, Texas =

- Ghost town
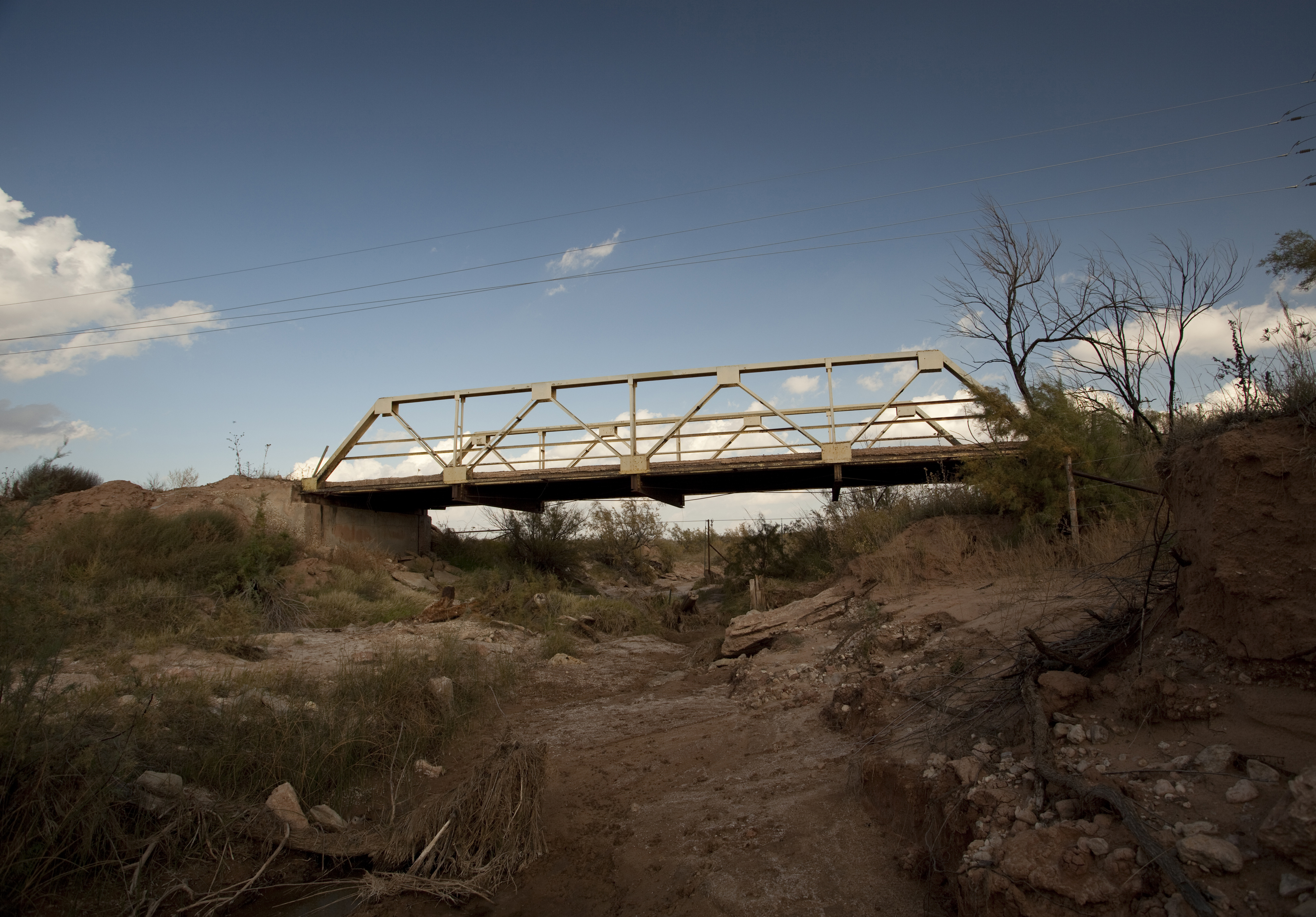
- Pony-truss bridge in Canyon Valley

- Location within Texas Location within the United States
- Coordinates: 33°24′04″N 101°20′07″W
- Country: United States
- State: Texas
- County: Crosby
- Region: Llano Estacado
- Established: 1925
- Founded by: James A. Shoemaker
- Elevation: 2,516 ft (767 m)
- Time zone: UTC-6 (CST)
- Area code: 806

Canyon Valley is a ghost town in southern Crosby County, Texas, United States. Today, only a few farms and ranches are scattered across the area.

== Geography ==
Canyon Valley is located 25 mi (40 km) south of Ralls in southwestern Crosby County. Only one road passes through Canyon Valley, and it is unpaved and passes through a low-water crossing that is often impassable during wet weather. The nearest paved road is Texas State Highway 207, which passes to the west at a distance around 3 mi (4.8 km).

Canyon Valley lies below the Caprock, which defines the southeastern edge of the vast Llano Estacado. It lies within the physiographic region known as the Rolling Plains in the highly eroded valley of the Salt Fork Brazos River.

== History ==
In 1925, James A. Shoemaker brought his family to Crosby County, where he bought a quarter-section of land 3 miles south of the small community of Cap Rock. A three-room house was built on the property, while the land was cleared for farming. Water was hauled in barrels by wagon from the Salt Fork Brazos River until a well was dug with hand tools.

The community grew slowly, but by the early 1930s, Canyon Valley had a cotton gin and a general store. The Valley Gin produced 2,230 bales of cotton in 1934. In 1953, the commissioners court proposed a 5 mi (8.0 km) paved road that would have connected the Valley Gin to the "Ralls and Post Highway" (SH 207). Unfortunately, the proposed road was rejected by the district highway engineer. Although a paved road was never completed, two steel pony-truss bridges were constructed to span Lake Creek and another unnamed dry creek that intermittently becomes a tributary of the Salt Fork Brazos River. The lack of a paved road leading to the community limited the growth of Canyon Valley, and in the late 1950s, the Valley Gin shut down and consolidated with the gin in nearby Kalgary, Texas.

== Education ==
In the early days of Canyon Valley, as more families moved into the area, the number of children grew until enough children were present to justify building a school. In 1926, a one-room schoolhouse was built, and by 1928, a second room was added to the schoolhouse to accommodate the growing student population. The total number of students in Canyon Valley school increased to 66 in 1934, and then reduced to 60 students in 1942. The school served the community until 1947, when it was consolidated with the Cap Rock school to form the Caprock Consolidated Independent School District. A grade school remained in operation at Cap Rock until August 23, 1960, when the district was consolidated with Ralls Independent School District.

== See also ==
- Blanco Canyon
- Double Mountain Fork Brazos River
- List of ghost towns in Texas
- Little Red River
- McDonald Creek
- West Texas
- White River (Texas)
- Yellow House Canyon
