= Bridge Creek, Oklahoma =

- Town
- Location within Oklahoma Location within the United States
- Coordinates: 35°14′5″N 97°44′7″W
- Country: United States
- State: Oklahoma
- County: Grady

Area
  - Total: 1.57 sq mi (4.07 km^{2})
  - Land: 1.57 sq mi (4.07 km^{2})
  - Water: 0 sq mi (0.00 km^{2})
- Elevation: 1,345 ft (410 m)

Population (2020)
  - Total: 336
  - Density: 213.6/sq mi (82.46/km^{2})
- Time zone: UTC-6 (CST)
  - Summer (DST): UTC-5 (CDT)
- ZIP code: 73010 / 73089
- Area code: 405
- FIPS code: 40-08725
- GNIS ID: 2411725

Bridge Creek is a town in Grady County, Oklahoma, United States. As of the 2020 census, the town population was 336, a 0% change from 2010.

== History ==
Bridge Creek was incorporated as a town in 2000. The town proper and the unincorporated areas that its limits enclose are part of a rapidly growing area of northern McClain and Grady counties known as the "Tri-City Area" with Newcastle, Tuttle, and Blanchard.

Bridge Creek was one of several communities hardest hit by an F5 tornado in the infamous May 3, 1999, tornado outbreak. At least 11 people died in the Bridge Creek area. Doppler weather radar measured wind speeds of 321 mph (517 km/h) in this tornado when it was near Bridge Creek. This tornado currently stands with the highest rated windspeed recorded on Earth.

The town was hit again by an EF3 tornado on May 6, 2015, 16 years and 3 days after the 1999 tornado. Homes were destroyed or heavily damaged.

== Geography ==
Bridge Creek is bordered to the north, west, and southwest by the city of Tuttle, to the south by the city of Blanchard, and to the east by the city of Newcastle in McClain County.

Interstate 44, the H. E. Bailey Turnpike, forms the southeastern border of the town, leading northeast 25 miles (40 km) to downtown Oklahoma City and southwest 17 miles (27 km) to Chickasha, the Grady County seat. Oklahoma State Highway 4, the H. E. Bailey Turnpike Norman Spur, leads north through the center of Bridge Creek and continues north 11 miles (18 km) to Mustang.

According to the U.S. Census Bureau, the town of Bridge Creek has a total area of 1.6 square miles (4.2 km^{2}), all land.

== Demographics ==
Historical population
Census	Pop.	Note	%±
2000	36		—
2010	336		833.3%
2020	336		0.0%
U.S. Decennial Census

=== 2020 census ===
As of the 2020 census, Bridge Creek had a population of 336. The median age was 40.3 years. 22.9% of residents were under the age of 18 and 17.3% of residents were 65 years of age or older. For every 100 females there were 96.5 males, and for every 100 females age 18 and over there were 99.2 males age 18 and over.

0.0% of residents lived in urban areas, while 100.0% lived in rural areas.

There were 121 households in Bridge Creek, of which 42.1% had children under the age of 18 living in them. Of all households, 68.6% were married-couple households, 11.6% were households with a male householder and no spouse or partner present, and 10.7% were households with a female householder and no spouse or partner present. About 15.7% of all households were made up of individuals and 8.3% had someone living alone who was 65 years of age or older.

There were 127 housing units, of which 4.7% were vacant. The homeowner vacancy rate was 0.9% and the rental vacancy rate was 6.3%.

Racial composition as of the 2020 census
Race	Number	Percent
White	270	80.4%
Black or African American	6	1.8%
American Indian and Alaska Native	17	5.1%
Asian	6	1.8%
Native Hawaiian and Other Pacific Islander	0	0.0%
Some other race	0	0.0%
Two or more races	37	11.0%
Hispanic or Latino (of any race)	19	5.7%
