= Robertson, Texas =

- Unincorporated community
- Location within Texas Location within the United States
- Coordinates: 33°33′51″N 101°30′49″W
- Country: United States
- State: Texas
- County: Crosby
- Elevation: 3,097 ft (944 m)
- Time zone: UTC-6 (Central (CST))
  - Summer (DST): UTC-5 (CDT)
- Area code: 806
- GNIS feature ID: 1380446

Robertson is an unincorporated community in Crosby County, Texas, United States. According to the Handbook of Texas, the community had a population of 35 in 2000. It is located within the Lubbock metropolitan area.

== Geography ==
Robertson is located at the intersection of Farm to Market Roads 1525 and 378, 16 mi (26 km) east of Lubbock in southwestern Crosby County.
