= Lorenzo High School =

Location
- 3rd & Polk Street; Lorenzo, Texas 79343-0520; United States; 33.6719°N 101.5318°W

Information
- School type: Public high school
- School district: Lorenzo Independent School District
- Principal: Tanner Bales
- Grades: K-12
- Enrollment: 215 (2023-2024)
- Colors: Purple, Black ,& White
- Athletics conference: UIL Class A
- Mascot: Hornet
- Yearbook: The Hornet
- Website: Lorenzo High School

Lorenzo High School or Lorenzo Secondary School is a public high school located in Lorenzo, Texas (USA) and classified as a 1A school by the UIL. It is part of the Lorenzo Independent School District located in far west central Crosby County. In 2015, the school was rated "Met Standard" by the Texas Education Agency.

== Athletics ==
The Lorenzo Hornets compete in the following sports:

- Basketball
- Cross Country
- 6-Man Football
- Golf
- Tennis
- Track & Field

== Notable Alumnus ==
Joe Reed - San Francisco 49ers quarterback attended Lorenzo High.
