= Owens, Crosby County, Texas =

- Unincorporated community
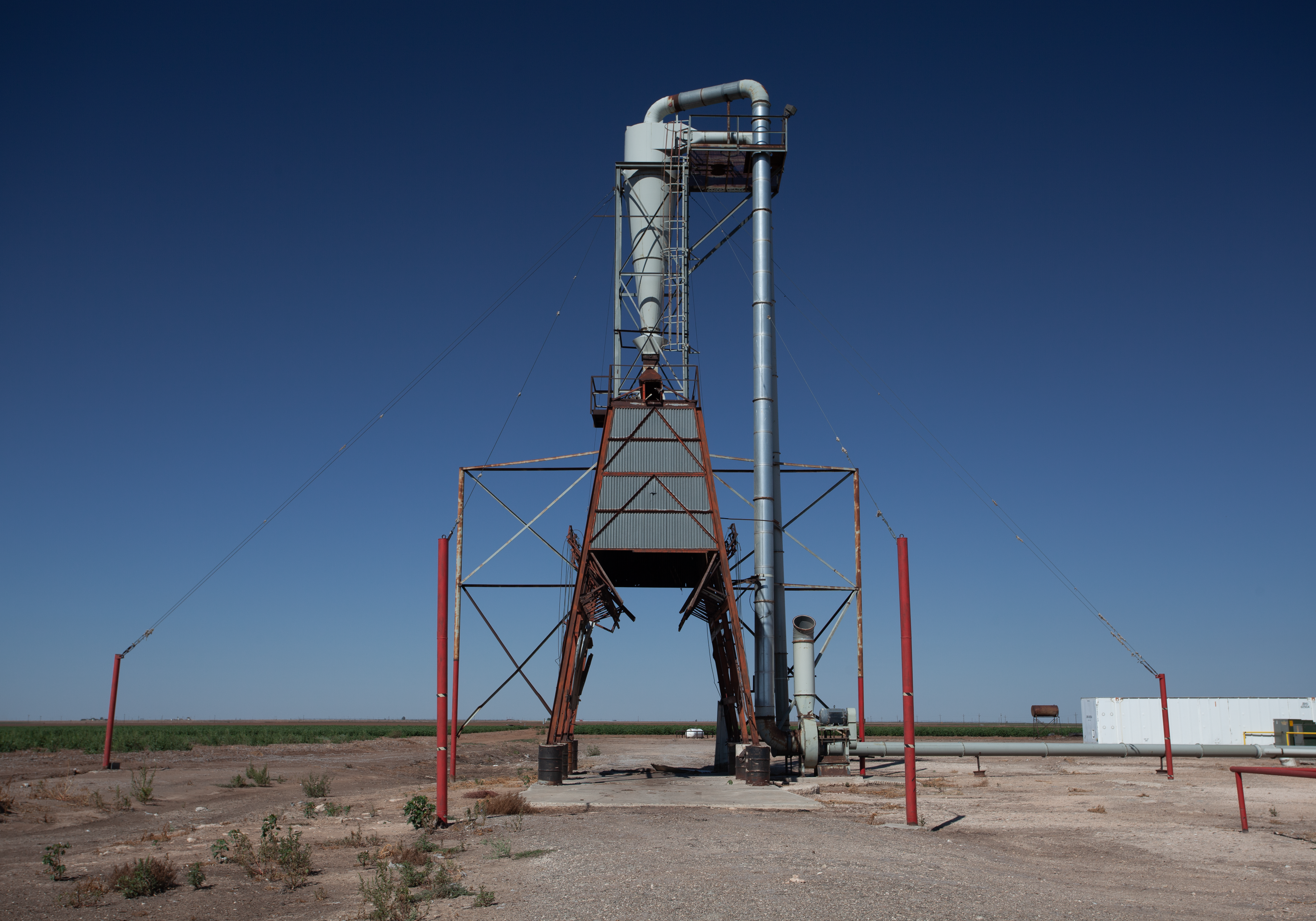
- Seed hopper at the cotton gin in Owens, Texas

- Location within Texas Location within the United States
- Coordinates: 33°33′30″N 101°21′10″W
- Country: United States
- State: Texas
- County: Crosby
- Elevation: 3,035 ft (925 m)
- Time zone: UTC-6 (Central (CST))
  - Summer (DST): UTC-5 (CDT)
- Area code: 806
- GNIS feature ID: 1380316

Owens is an unincorporated community in Crosby County, Texas, United States. According to the Handbook of Texas, the community had a population of 40 in 2000. It is located within the Lubbock metropolitan area.

== History ==
Tom B. Owens is the namesake of the community. In the 1920s, Owens had a cotton gin, a store, and a four-room brick school. Owens' population was reported as 75 from 1980 through 1990, then went down to 40 in 2000.

On May 5, 2015, two F0 tornadoes struck Owens. A storm chaser observed the first narrow tornado that touched down for three minutes in open country. It soon roped out and merged with a new tornado, which crossed Texas State Highway 207. No damage was observed.

== Geography ==
Owens is located on Farm to Market Road 40, 28 mi (45 km) east of Lubbock in Crosby County.

== Education ==
By the end of the 20th century, the community joined the Ralls Independent School District.
