= Hinojo =

Hinojo is a Spanish surname. Notable people with the surname include:

- Roger Hinojo (born 2005), Spanish professional footballer
- Rene Hinojo (born 1983), Spanish professional footballer

== See also ==
- Hinojo, the Spanish word for Fennel
- Hinojos (surname)
