= Lorenzo, Texas =

- City
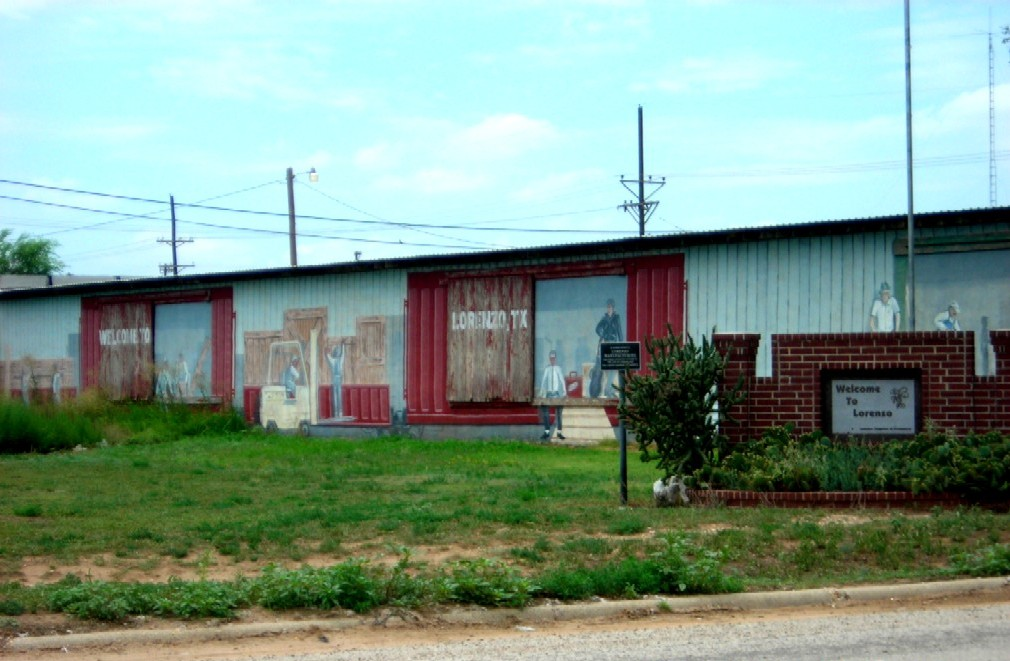
- A mural in Lorenzo

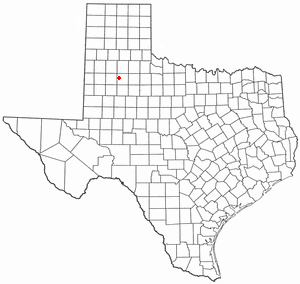
- Location of Lorenzo, Texas

- Coordinates: 33°40′13″N 101°32′10″W
- Country: United States
- State: Texas
- County: Crosby
- Incorporated (city): 2 April 1924

Government
  - Type: Mayor-Council
  - Mayor: Rhonda Cypert

Area
  - Total: 0.95 sq mi (2.47 km^{2})
  - Land: 0.95 sq mi (2.47 km^{2})
  - Water: 0 sq mi (0.00 km^{2})
- Elevation: 3,169 ft (966 m)

Population (2020)
  - Total: 964
  - Density: 1,010/sq mi (390/km^{2})
- Time zone: UTC-6 (Central (CST))
  - Summer (DST): UTC-5 (CDT)
- ZIP code: 79343
- Area code: 806
- FIPS code: 48-44032
- GNIS feature ID: 2410874
- Website: www.cityoflorenzo.net

Lorenzo is a city in Crosby County, Texas, United States. As of the 2020 census, the city population was 964, down from 1,147 in 2010. It is part of the Lubbock Metropolitan Statistical Area.

== Geography ==
Lorenzo is located in western Crosby County on U.S. Routes 62 and 82 and State Highways 114 and 378. It is 20 miles (32 km) east of Lubbock and 17 miles (27 km) west of Crosbyton, the Crosby County seat.

According to the United States Census Bureau, Lorenzo has a total area of 0.97 square miles (2.5 km^{2}), all land.

== Economy ==
The local economy is supported by agriculture, with cotton being the most important crop. Wheat, soybeans, milo, and various other crops are also produced in the Lorenzo area.

== Demographics ==
Historical population
Census	Pop.	Note	%±
1930	739		—
1940	616		−16.6%
1950	939		52.4%
1960	1,188		26.5%
1970	1,206		1.5%
1980	1,394		15.6%
1990	1,208		−13.3%
2000	1,372		13.6%
2010	1,147		−16.4%
2020	964		−16.0%
U.S. Decennial Census

=== 2020 census ===
As of the 2020 census, Lorenzo had a population of 964, 371 households, and 254 families residing in the city. The median age was 38.9 years; 27.0% of residents were under the age of 18 and 16.3% of residents were 65 years of age or older. For every 100 females there were 88.6 males, and for every 100 females age 18 and over there were 86.2 males age 18 and over.

There were 371 households in Lorenzo, of which 37.7% had children under the age of 18 living in them. Of all households, 44.7% were married-couple households, 18.3% were households with a male householder and no spouse or partner present, and 29.9% were households with a female householder and no spouse or partner present. About 24.5% of all households were made up of individuals and 11.3% had someone living alone who was 65 years of age or older.

There were 462 housing units, of which 19.7% were vacant. The homeowner vacancy rate was 1.8% and the rental vacancy rate was 15.9%.

0.0% of residents lived in urban areas, while 100.0% lived in rural areas.

Racial composition as of the 2020 census
Race	Number	Percent
White	535	55.5%
Black or African American	44	4.6%
American Indian and Alaska Native	3	0.3%
Asian	0	0.0%
Native Hawaiian and Other Pacific Islander	0	0.0%
Some other race	157	16.3%
Two or more races	225	23.3%
Hispanic or Latino (of any race)	626	64.9%

=== 2000 census ===
As of the census of 2000, 1,372 people, 472 households, and 353 families resided in the city. The population density was 1,329.3 inhabitants per square mile (513.2/km^{2}). The 525 housing units averaged 508.7 per square mile (196.8/km^{2}). The racial makeup of the city was 64.65% White, 6.63%African American, 1.24% Native American, 0.07% Asian, 25.15% from other races, and 2.26% from two or more races. Hispanics or Latinos of any race were 54.01% of the population.

Of the 472 households, 36.7% had children under the age of 18 living with them, 57.4% were married couples living together, 13.6% had a female householder with no husband present, and 25.2% were not families. About 23.5% of all households were made up of individuals, and 11.2% had someone living alone who was 65 years of age or older. The average household size was 2.91 and the average family size was 3.48.

In the city, the population was distributed as 32.1% under the age of 18, 9.5% from 18 to 24, 24.7% from 25 to 44, 20.3% from 45 to 64, and 13.3% who were 65 years of age or older. The median age was 32 years. For every 100 females, there were 97.4 males. For every 100 females age 18 and over, there were 88.7 males.

The median income for a household in the city was $24,438, and for a family was $31,429. Males had a median income of $23,646 versus $19,250 for females. The per capita income for the city was $11,606. About 25.9% of families and 35.6% of the population were below the poverty line, including 45.4% of those under age 18 and 22.3% of those age 65 or over.

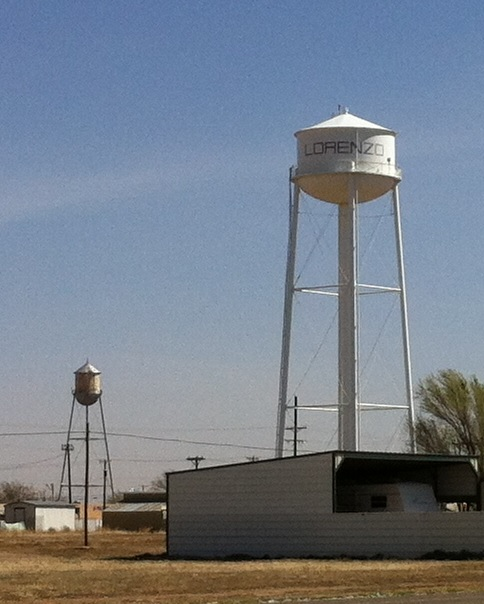
Water towers of Lorenzo

== Education ==
The city is served by the Lorenzo Independent School District and is home to the Lorenzo High School Hornets.

== Climate ==
According to the Köppen climate classification system, Lorenzo has a semiarid climate, BSk on climate maps.
