= Joe Reed (quarterback) =

American football player (born 1948)

No. 13, 19, 14
- Position: Quarterback

Personal information
- Born: January 8, 1948 (age 78); Newport, Rhode Island, U.S.
- Listed height: 6 ft 1 in (1.85 m)
- Listed weight: 195 lb (88 kg)

Career information
- High school: Lorenzo (TX)
- College: Mississippi State
- NFL draft: 1971: 11th round, 283rd overall pick

Career history
- San Francisco 49ers (1971–1974); Detroit Lions (1975–1979)

Career NFL statistics
- Passing attempts: 513
- Passing completions: 225
- Completion percentage: 43.9%
- TD–INT: 18–31
- Passing yards: 2,825
- Passer rating: 48.1
- Stats at Pro Football Reference

Joe Reed (born January 8, 1948) is an American former professional football player who was a quarterback in the National Football League (NFL). He played college football for the Mississippi State Bulldogs before playing in the NFL for the San Francisco 49ers (1972–1974) and Detroit Lions (1975–1979). He recorded an album of standards with the 49ers' cheerleading squad, then known as the Niner Nuggets, in 1974.
