= Crosbyton Consolidated Independent School District =

School district in Texas

Crosbyton Consolidated Independent School District is a public school district based in Crosbyton, Texas, United States.

It is located in Crosby County, a small portion of the district extends into Garza County.

Crosbyton Consolidated ISD has three campuses – Crosbyton High (grades 9–12), Crosbyton Middle (grades 6–8), and Crosbyton Elementary (grades PK–5).

On July 1, 1985, portions of the McAdoo Independent School District were incorporated into Crosbyton ISD. The new entity was renamed to the Crosbyton Consolidated Independent School District.

In 2009, the school district was rated "academically acceptable" by the Texas Education Agency.
