= Crosby County, Texas =

County in Texas, United States

- County
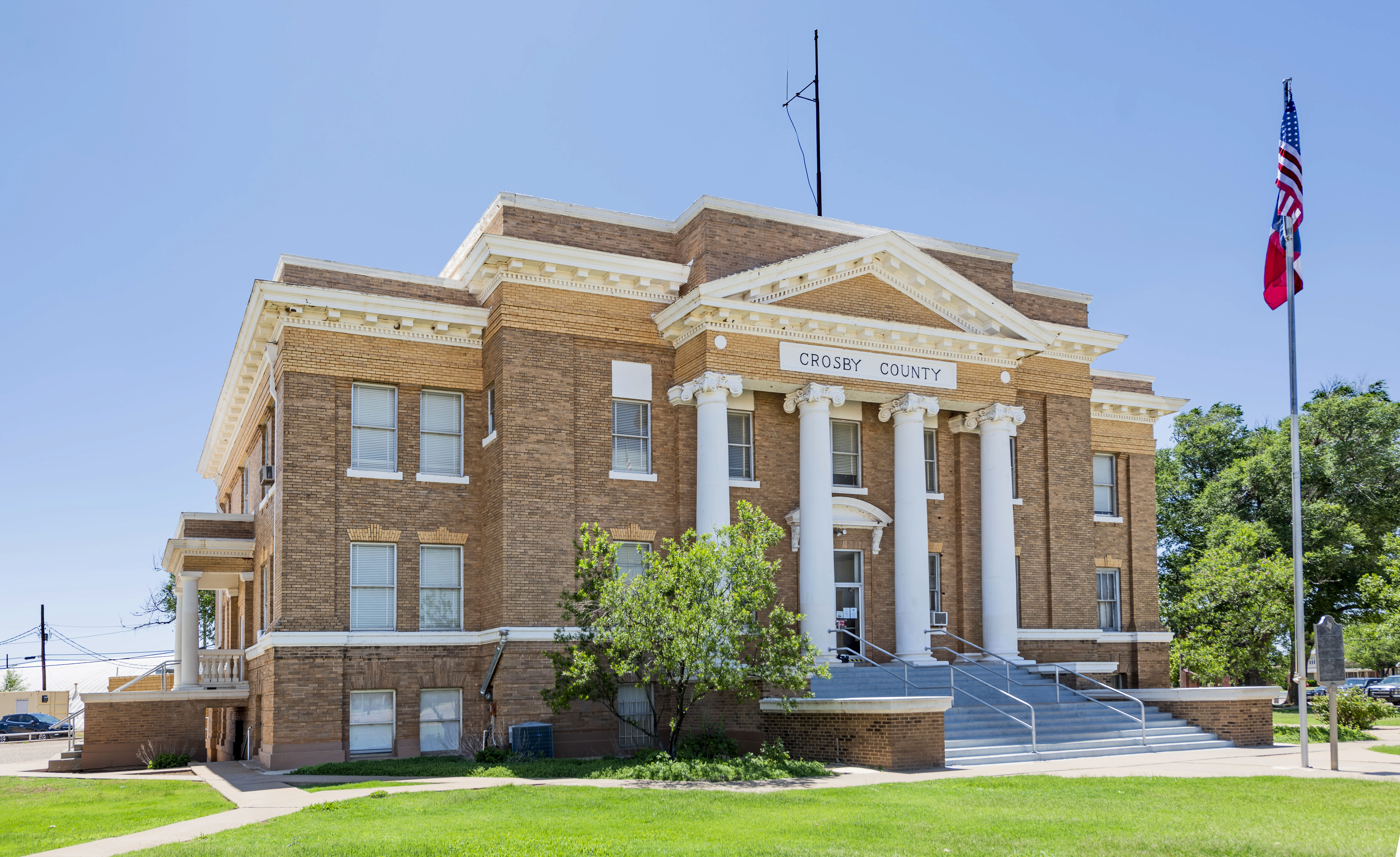
- Crosby County Courthouse in Crosbyton

- Location within the U.S. state of Texas
- Coordinates: 33°37′N 101°18′W
- Country: United States
- State: Texas
- Founded: 1886
- Named for: Stephen Crosby
- Seat: Crosbyton
- Largest city: Ralls

Area
  - Total: 902 sq mi (2,340 km^{2})
  - Land: 900 sq mi (2,300 km^{2})
  - Water: 1.5 sq mi (3.9 km^{2}) 0.2%

Population (2020)
  - Total: 5,133
  - Estimate (2025): 4,852 ▼
  - Density: 5.7/sq mi (2.2/km^{2})
- Time zone: UTC−6 (Central)
  - Summer (DST): UTC−5 (CDT)
- Congressional district: 19th
- Website: www.co.crosby.tx.us

Crosby County is a county located in the U.S. state of Texas. As of the 2020 census, its population was 5,133. The county seat is Crosbyton. The county was founded in 1876 and later organized in 1886. Both the county and its seat are named for Stephen Crosby, a land commissioner in Texas.

Crosby County, along with Lubbock and Lynn Counties, is part of the Lubbock metropolitan statistical area (MSA). The Lubbock MSA and Levelland micropolitan statistical area encompassing only Hockley County, form the larger Lubbock–Levelland combined statistical area.

Until the passage of a referendum to permit liquor sales, held on May 11, 2013, Crosby County had been one of 19 remaining prohibition or entirely dry counties within Texas. That same day, voters in Denver City and Yoakum County also approved separate referendums to permit liquor sales. The number of prohibition counties in Texas at that time hence dropped to 17. Part of the large Matador Ranch of West Texas extends into the county.

== History ==
Around 11,000 BC, Paleo-Indians were the first inhabitants. Archeological artifacts indicate hunter-gatherers hunted the mammoth, mastodon, saber-toothed cat, and giant ground sloth. Later Native American inhabitants included the Comanche. In 1871, Ranald S. Mackenzie fought Quanah Parker and other Comanches at the Battle of Blanco Canyon. The campaign established the Mackenzie Trail used by the first settlers in Crosby County in the late 1870s.

The Texas Legislature formed Crosby County from Young and Bexar districts in 1876. Bavarian Heinrich Schmidtt (Henry “Hank” Clay Smith) and his wife Elizabeth Boyle and their six children became the first permanent settlers in the area in 1878; Hank was active in the county's organization.

Confederate veteran Paris Cox first visited the Caprock Escarpment of the Llano Estacado with a group of buffalo hunters in 1879. Estacado was named the county seat in 1886. By 1900, the beef industry was thriving, supporting 30,618 head.

The country and western song (Ghost) Riders in the Sky was inspired by a legend of a stampede that took place in Crosby County in 1889

In 1908, the Bar-N-Bar Ranch began selling acreage to farmers.

Crosbyton became the new county seat in 1910. Some 45,400 acres (184 km^{2}) in the county were planted in cotton, and 15,000 apple and peach trees were growing in the county in 1920. By 1929, farmers owned 83,000 chickens and sold 395,000 dozen eggs that year.

The first soil conservation district in the county was formed in 1941. In 1955, oil was discovered in the county.

== Geography ==
According to the U.S. Census Bureau, the county has a total area of 902 square miles (2,340 km^{2}), of which 900 square miles (2,300 km^{2}) are land and 1.5 square miles (3.9 km^{2}) (0.2%) are covered by water.

=== Major highways ===
- U.S. Highway 62
- U.S. Highway 82/State Highway 114
- State Highway 207

=== Adjacent counties ===
- Floyd County (north)
- Motley County (northeast)
- Dickens County (east)
- Kent County (southeast)
- Garza County (south)
- Lynn County (southwest)
- Lubbock County (west)
- Hale County (northwest)

=== Geographic features ===
- Blanco Canyon
- White River, Silver Falls
- Mount Blanco
- Caprock Escarpment

== Demographics ==
Historical population
Census	Pop.	Note	%±
1880	82		—
1890	346		322.0%
1900	788		127.7%
1910	1,765		124.0%
1920	6,084		244.7%
1930	11,023		81.2%
1940	10,046		−8.9%
1950	9,582		−4.6%
1960	10,347		8.0%
1970	9,085		−12.2%
1980	8,859		−2.5%
1990	7,304		−17.6%
2000	7,072		−3.2%
2010	6,059		−14.3%
2020	5,133		−15.3%
2025 (est.)	4,852	▼	−5.5%
U.S. Decennial Census; 1850–2010 2010 2020

=== Racial and ethnic composition ===
Crosby County, Texas – Racial and ethnic composition Note: the US Census treats Hispanic/Latino as an ethnic category. This table excludes Latinos from the racial categories and assigns them to a separate category. Hispanics/Latinos may be of any race.
Race / Ethnicity (NH = Non-Hispanic)	Pop 2000	Pop 2010	Pop 2020	% 2000	% 2010	% 2020
White alone (NH)	3,301	2,625	2,076	46.68%	43.32%	40.44%
Black or African American alone (NH)	262	199	117	3.70%	3.28%	2.28%
Native American or Alaska Native alone (NH)	11	13	8	0.16%	0.21%	0.16%
Asian alone (NH)	2	4	12	0.03%	0.07%	0.23%
Pacific Islander alone (NH)	5	2	0	0.07%	0.03%	0.00%
Other race alone (NH)	0	8	6	0.00%	0.13%	0.12%
Mixed race or Multiracial (NH)	31	37	85	0.44%	0.61%	1.66%
Hispanic or Latino (any race)	3,460	3,171	2,829	48.93%	52.34%	55.11%
Total	7,072	6,059	5,133	100.00%	100.00%	100.00%

=== 2020 census ===
As of the 2020 census, the county had a population of 5,133. The median age was 42.0 years. 25.7% of residents were under the age of 18 and 20.4% of residents were 65 years of age or older. For every 100 females there were 95.5 males, and for every 100 females age 18 and over there were 93.5 males age 18 and over.

The racial makeup of the county was 63.5% White, 2.9% Black or African American, 0.8% American Indian and Alaska Native, 0.2% Asian, <0.1% Native Hawaiian and Pacific Islander, 17.2% from some other race, and 15.4% from two or more races. Hispanic or Latino residents of any race comprised 55.1% of the population.

<0.1% of residents lived in urban areas, while 100.0% lived in rural areas.

There were 1,984 households in the county, of which 32.3% had children under the age of 18 living in them. Of all households, 49.0% were married-couple households, 18.7% were households with a male householder and no spouse or partner present, and 26.3% were households with a female householder and no spouse or partner present. About 24.9% of all households were made up of individuals and 12.7% had someone living alone who was 65 years of age or older.

There were 2,652 housing units, of which 25.2% were vacant. Among occupied housing units, 72.7% were owner-occupied and 27.3% were renter-occupied. The homeowner vacancy rate was 1.4% and the rental vacancy rate was 14.5%.

=== 2000 census ===
As of the census of 2000, 7,072 people, 2,512 households, and 1,866 families resided in the county. The population density was eight people per square mile (3.1 people/km^{2}). The 3,202 housing units averaged four units per square mile (1.5 units/km^{2}). The racial makeup of the county was 63.77% White, 3.89% Black or African American, 0.54% Native American, 0.03% Asian, 0.07% Pacific Islander, 29.89% from other races, and 1.81% from two or more races. About 48.93% of the population was Hispanic or Latino of any race.

Of the 2,512 households, 35.6% had children under the age of 18 living with them, 59.0% were married couples living together, 11.4% had a female householder with no husband present, and 25.7% were not families. About 23.8% of all households were made up of individuals, and 13.4% had someone living alone who was 65 years of age or older. The average household size was 2.78 and the average family size was 3.30.

In the county, the population was distributed as 30.7% under the age of 18, 8.5% from 18 to 24, 24.0% from 25 to 44, 21.1% from 45 to 64, and 15.6% who were 65 years of age or older. The median age was 34 years. For every 100 females, there were 91.1 males. For every 100 females age 18 and over, there were 87.2 males.

The median income for a household in the county was $25,769, and for a family was $29,891. Males had a median income of $23,775 versus $17,229 for females. The per capita income for the county was $14,445. About 22.6% of families and 28.1% of the population were below the poverty line, including 36.6% of those under age 18 and 22.7% of those age 65 or over.

== Communities ==
=== Cities ===
- Crosbyton (county seat)
- Lorenzo
- Ralls

=== Unincorporated communities ===
- Broadway
- Cap Rock
- Cone
- Estacado (partly in Lubbock County)
- Kalgary
- Owens
- Robertson

=== Ghost towns ===
- Canyon Valley
- Farmer
- Mount Blanco
- Savage
- Wake

== Education ==
School districts serving the county include:

- Crosbyton Consolidated Independent School District
- Lorenzo Independent School District
- Petersburg Independent School District
- Ralls Independent School District

The county is in the service area of South Plains College.

== Gallery ==
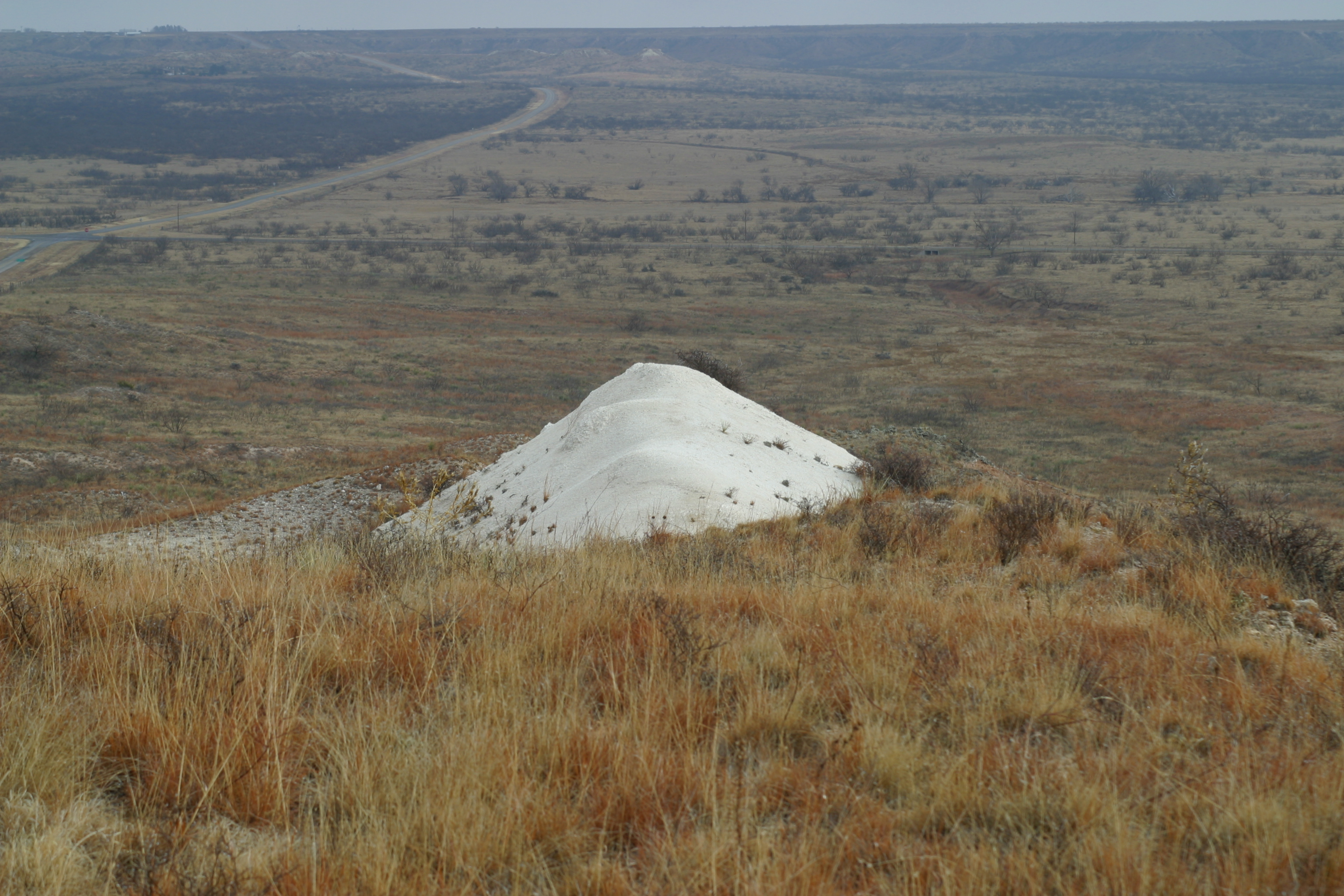
Mount Blanco

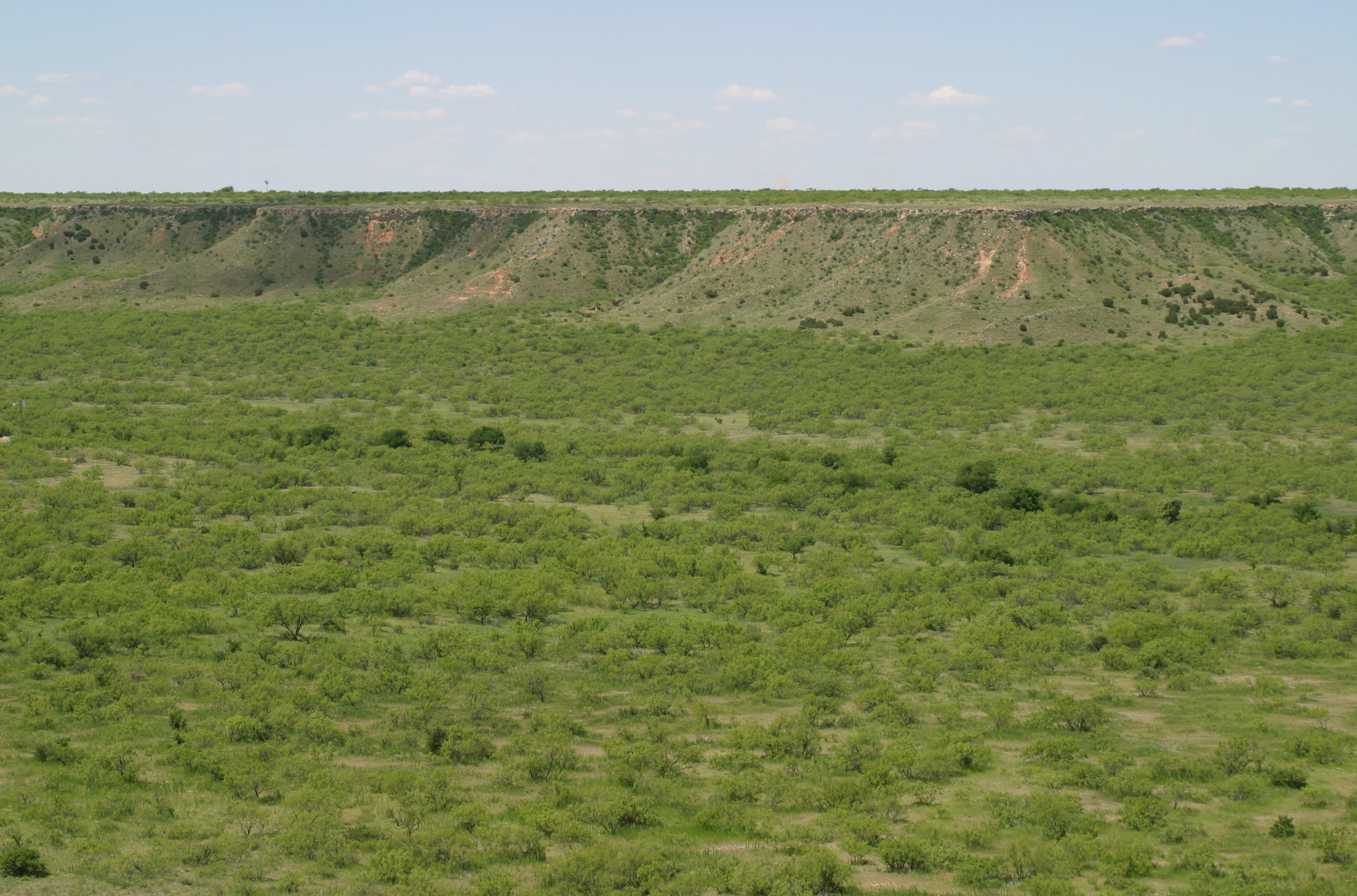
Blanco Canyon

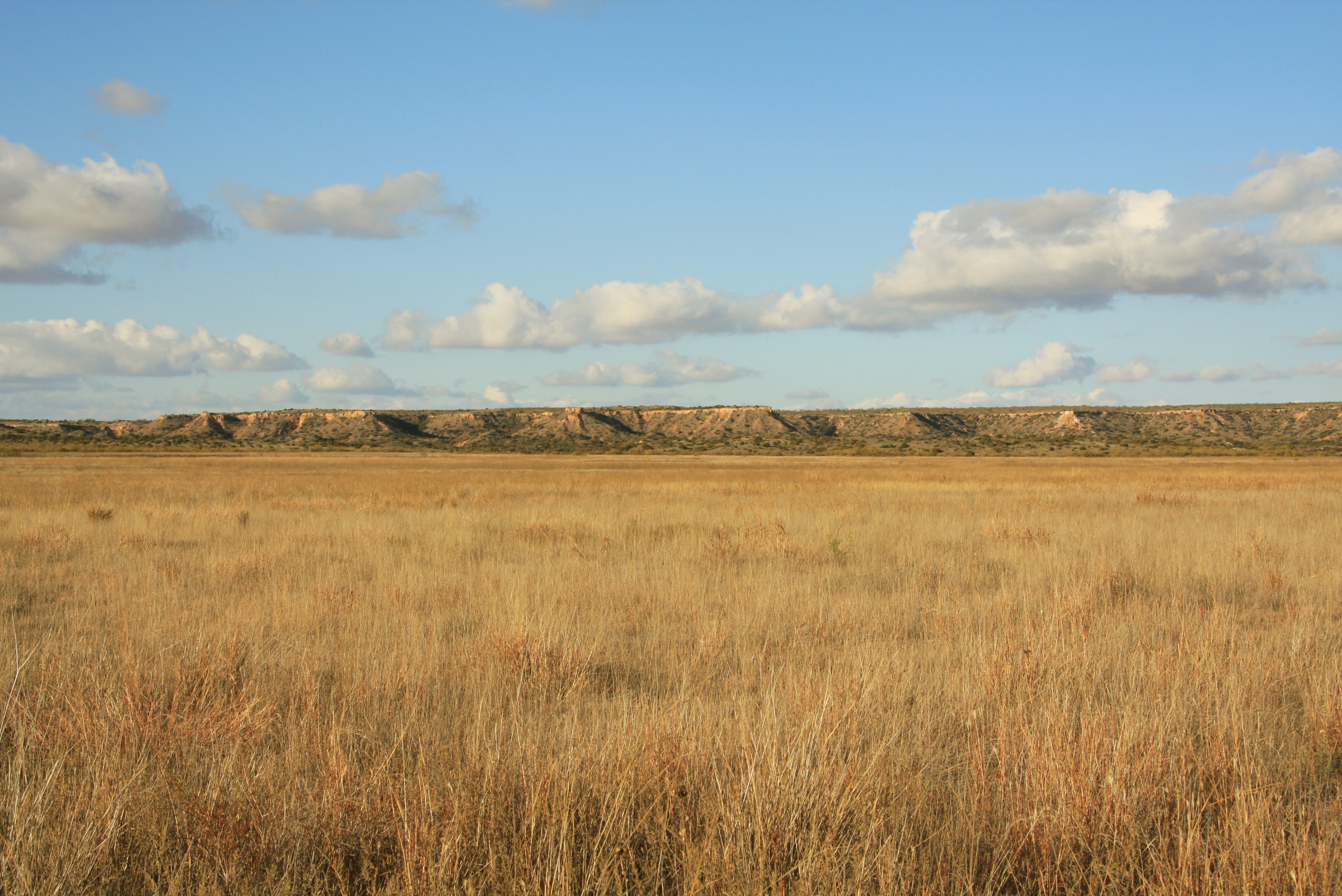
Caprock Escarpment south of Ralls

== Politics ==
Republican Drew Springer Jr., a businessman from Muenster in Cooke County, has since January 2013 represented Crosby County in the Texas House of Representatives.

Crosby County is located within District 83 of the Texas House of Representatives. Crosby County is located within District 28 of the Texas Senate.

United States presidential election results for Crosby County, Texas
Year	Republican		Democratic		Third party(ies)	
Year	No.	%	No.	%	No.	%
1912	7	2.37%	247	83.73%	41	13.90%
1916	31	5.82%	456	85.55%	46	8.63%
1920	146	18.67%	572	73.15%	64	8.18%
1924	278	17.89%	1,242	79.92%	34	2.19%
1928	1,004	57.97%	728	42.03%	0	0.00%
1932	108	6.36%	1,590	93.64%	0	0.00%
1936	153	8.19%	1,711	91.64%	3	0.16%
1940	276	13.79%	1,720	85.91%	6	0.30%
1944	201	9.45%	1,691	79.50%	235	11.05%
1948	168	8.12%	1,731	83.66%	170	8.22%
1952	1,053	40.45%	1,550	59.55%	0	0.00%
1956	704	28.00%	1,804	71.76%	6	0.24%
1960	889	33.13%	1,783	66.46%	11	0.41%
1964	611	21.13%	2,278	78.77%	3	0.10%
1968	865	30.46%	1,574	55.42%	401	14.12%
1972	1,503	59.15%	1,021	40.18%	17	0.67%
1976	897	29.01%	2,176	70.38%	19	0.61%
1980	1,361	48.50%	1,408	50.18%	37	1.32%
1984	1,376	52.94%	1,212	46.63%	11	0.42%
1988	1,121	43.75%	1,435	56.01%	6	0.23%
1992	1,006	43.08%	1,010	43.25%	319	13.66%
1996	968	42.33%	1,122	49.06%	197	8.61%
2000	1,270	63.44%	705	35.21%	27	1.35%
2004	1,647	72.40%	622	27.34%	6	0.26%
2008	1,221	63.79%	684	35.74%	9	0.47%
2012	1,132	63.35%	639	35.76%	16	0.90%
2016	1,181	68.34%	468	27.08%	79	4.57%
2020	1,396	71.48%	527	26.98%	30	1.54%
2024	1,416	75.32%	451	23.99%	13	0.69%

United States Senate election results for Crosby County, Texas1
Year	Republican		Democratic		Third party(ies)	
Year	No.	%	No.	%	No.	%
2024	1,370	73.66%	438	23.55%	52	2.80%

United States Senate election results for Crosby County, Texas2
Year	Republican		Democratic		Third party(ies)	
Year	No.	%	No.	%	No.	%
2020	1,356	72.09%	486	25.84%	39	2.07%

Texas Gubernatorial election results for Crosby County
Year	Republican		Democratic		Third party(ies)	
Year	No.	%	No.	%	No.	%
2022	990	78.95%	255	20.33%	9	0.72%

== See also ==
- Llano Estacado
- Mount Blanco
- Farm to Market Road 2591
- List of museums in West Texas

- National Register of Historic Places listings in Crosby County, Texas
- Recorded Texas Historic Landmarks in Crosby County
- Yellow House Canyon
