= Crosbyton, Texas =

- City
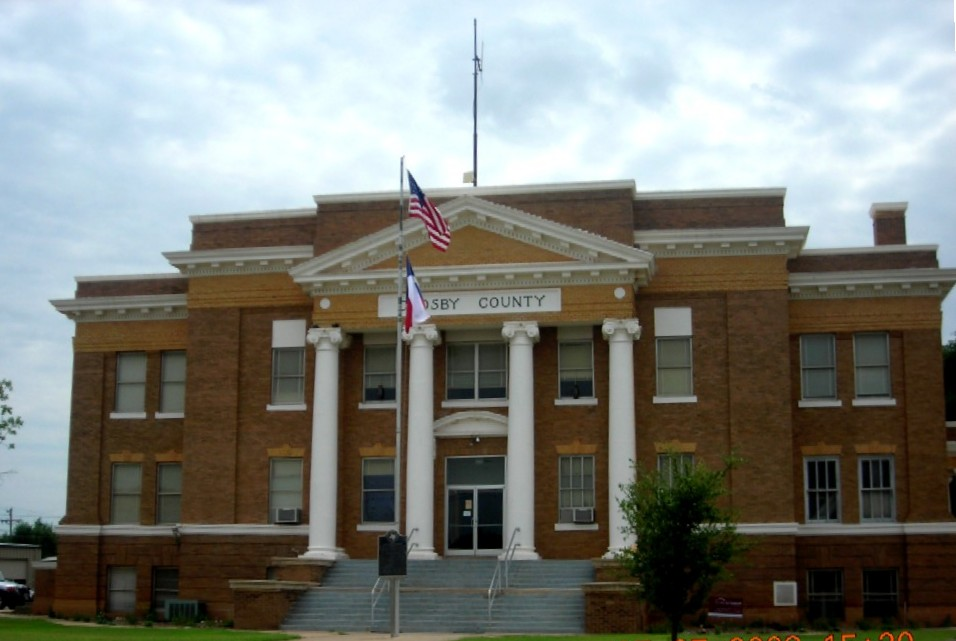
- The Crosby County Courthouse in Crosbyton
- Motto: "Where the 19th century meets the 21st century"
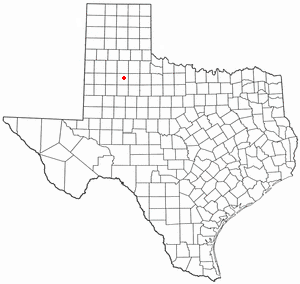
- Location of Crosbyton, Texas

- Coordinates: 33°38′29″N 101°14′16″W
- Country: United States
- State: Texas
- County: Crosby
- Incorporated (city): 1917

Government
  - Type: Mayor-Council
  - Mayor: Dusty Cornelius

Area
  - Total: 2.11 sq mi (5.47 km^{2})
  - Land: 2.11 sq mi (5.47 km^{2})
  - Water: 0 sq mi (0.00 km^{2})
- Elevation: 3,009 ft (917 m)

Population (2020)
  - Total: 1,492
  - Density: 706/sq mi (273/km^{2})
  - Demonym: Crosbytonian
- Time zone: UTC−6 (Central (CST))
  - Summer (DST): UTC−5 (CDT)
- ZIP code: 79322
- Area code: 806
- FIPS code: 48-17768
- GNIS feature ID: 2410267
- Website: www.cityofcrosbyton.org

Crosbyton is a city in and the county seat of Crosby County, Texas, United States. The population was 1,492 at the 2020 census. Crosbyton is part of the Lubbock metropolitan area.

== History ==
The city was named for land office commissioner Stephen Crosby.

In 1902, the C. B. Livestock Company purchased 90,000 acres. By 1912, a 10,000-acre demonstration farm, managed by Judge L. Gough, showcased the area's potential for cotton cultivation, leading to significant land sales from 1907 to 1915.

The town's foundation began in 1908 when the C. B. Livestock Company surveyed a townsite, subsequently opening Crosbyton for settlement. The Crosbyton post office was established in July 1908. The Crosbyton Inn, a three-story hotel, was erected the same year.

In 1910, Crosbyton secured the county seat designation after winning a vote against Emma. The Crosbyton-South Plains Railroad commenced operations on April 10, 1911.

The town's first hospital opened in 1947, and in 1975, the Crosbyton Municipal Airport was dedicated. In 1976, Texas Tech University built a 65-foot diameter solar dish, the world's largest at the time, to harvest solar power.

Recognizing the town's heritage, Zina Lamar established the Crosby County Pioneer Memorial Museum in 1958. This facility serves as a community center and museum, preserving artifacts of area pioneers.

== Geography ==
Crosbyton is located slightly northeast of the center of Crosby County along U.S. Route 82, approximately 2 miles (3 km) west of Blanco Canyon at the eastern edge of the Llano Estacado. US 82 leads east 24 miles (39 km) to Dickens and west 38 miles (61 km) to Lubbock.

According to the United States Census Bureau, Crosbyton has a total area of 2.1 square miles (5.5 km^{2}), all land.

== Demographics ==
Historical population
Census	Pop.	Note	%±
1920	809		—
1930	1,250		54.5%
1940	1,615		29.2%
1950	1,879		16.3%
1960	2,088		11.1%
1970	2,251		7.8%
1980	2,289		1.7%
1990	2,026		−11.5%
2000	1,874		−7.5%
2010	1,741		−7.1%
2020	1,492		−14.3%
U.S. Decennial Census

=== 2020 census ===
As of the 2020 census, Crosbyton had a population of 1,492, and the median age was 43.0 years; 25.7% of residents were under the age of 18 and 21.2% were 65 years of age or older. For every 100 females there were 93.0 males, and for every 100 females age 18 and over there were 93.0 males age 18 and over.

There were 590 households in Crosbyton, of which 29.7% had children under the age of 18 living in them. Of all households, 48.8% were married-couple households, 19.0% were households with a male householder and no spouse or partner present, and 26.3% were households with a female householder and no spouse or partner present. About 25.5% of all households were made up of individuals and 12.2% had someone living alone who was 65 years of age or older.

There were 726 housing units, of which 18.7% were vacant. The homeowner vacancy rate was 1.7% and the rental vacancy rate was 14.1%.

0.0% of residents lived in urban areas, while 100.0% lived in rural areas.

Racial composition as of the 2020 census
Race	Number	Percent
White	959	64.3%
Black or African American	66	4.4%
American Indian and Alaska Native	19	1.3%
Asian	2	0.1%
Native Hawaiian and Other Pacific Islander	0	0.0%
Some other race	238	16.0%
Two or more races	208	13.9%
Hispanic or Latino (of any race)	881	59.0%

=== 2000 census ===
As of the census of 2000, 1,874 people, 677 households, and 482 families resided in the city. The population density was 886.9 inhabitants per square mile (342.4/km^{2}). The 781 housing units averaged 369.6 per square mile (142.9/km^{2}). The racial makeup of the city was 62.49% White, 5.71% African American, 0.21% Native American, 0.05% Asian, 30.15% from other races, and 1.39% from two or more races. Hispanics or Latinos of any race were 47.65% of the population.

Of the 677 households, 34.6% had children under the age of 18 living with them, 55.8% were married couples living together, 11.1% had a female householder with no husband present, and 28.8% were not families. About 27.3% of all households were made up of individuals, and 17.6% had someone living alone who was 65 years of age or older. The average household size was 2.68 and the average family size was 3.26.

In the city, the population was distributed as 28.8% under the age of 18, 8.8% from 18 to 24, 24.3% from 25 to 44, 20.8% from 45 to 64, and 17.4% who were 65 years of age or older. The median age was 36 years. For every 100 females, there were 85.9 males. For every 100 females age 18 and over, there were 82.4 males.

The median income for a household in the city was $24,722, and for a family was $30,900. Males had a median income of $22,647 versus $18,000 for females. The per capita income for the city was $16,329. About 23.7% of families and 28.0% of the population were below the poverty line, including 36.9% of those under age 18 and 25.9% of those age 65 or over.

== Education ==
The city is served by the Crosbyton Consolidated Independent School District.

== Climate ==
Crosbyton gets about 23 inches of rain each year. As a comparison, the US average is 39 inches. Snowfall averages seven inches, compared to the average of 26 inches of snow in American cities. The city receives some measurable precipitation approximately 40 days a year.

Sunny weather typically occurs 263 days per year. The Sperling comfort index for Crosbyton is 62 out of 100 (the higher score indicates a more comfortable year-round climate.

Climate data for Crosbyton, Texas (1991–2020 normals, extremes 1893–present)
Month	Jan	Feb	Mar	Apr	May	Jun	Jul	Aug	Sep	Oct	Nov	Dec	Year
Record high °F (°C)	87 (31)	92 (33)	96 (36)	103 (39)	111 (44)	113 (45)	110 (43)	110 (43)	108 (42)	101 (38)	92 (33)	84 (29)	113 (45)
Mean maximum °F (°C)	75.9 (24.4)	80.4 (26.9)	88.3 (31.3)	92.8 (33.8)	98.5 (36.9)	101.1 (38.4)	101.4 (38.6)	100.0 (37.8)	97.1 (36.2)	92.1 (33.4)	82.9 (28.3)	75.2 (24.0)	104.3 (40.2)
Mean daily maximum °F (°C)	54.0 (12.2)	58.7 (14.8)	67.2 (19.6)	75.6 (24.2)	83.0 (28.3)	89.9 (32.2)	92.7 (33.7)	92.0 (33.3)	84.8 (29.3)	75.4 (24.1)	63.5 (17.5)	54.6 (12.6)	74.3 (23.5)
Daily mean °F (°C)	40.0 (4.4)	43.8 (6.6)	51.9 (11.1)	60.0 (15.6)	69.1 (20.6)	77.0 (25.0)	80.1 (26.7)	79.3 (26.3)	72.0 (22.2)	61.6 (16.4)	49.7 (9.8)	41.2 (5.1)	60.5 (15.8)
Mean daily minimum °F (°C)	26.1 (−3.3)	28.9 (−1.7)	36.5 (2.5)	44.3 (6.8)	55.2 (12.9)	64.1 (17.8)	67.5 (19.7)	66.6 (19.2)	59.1 (15.1)	47.7 (8.7)	36.0 (2.2)	27.8 (−2.3)	46.6 (8.1)
Mean minimum °F (°C)	13.5 (−10.3)	16.2 (−8.8)	21.5 (−5.8)	30.9 (−0.6)	42.3 (5.7)	56.6 (13.7)	61.8 (16.6)	60.4 (15.8)	47.2 (8.4)	32.7 (0.4)	21.3 (−5.9)	14.0 (−10.0)	9.3 (−12.6)
Record low °F (°C)	−10 (−23)	−14 (−26)	−2 (−19)	17 (−8)	28 (−2)	39 (4)	48 (9)	42 (6)	32 (0)	16 (−9)	4 (−16)	−6 (−21)	−14 (−26)
Average precipitation inches (mm)	0.79 (20)	0.86 (22)	1.40 (36)	1.82 (46)	2.88 (73)	2.98 (76)	2.40 (61)	2.01 (51)	2.73 (69)	1.73 (44)	1.12 (28)	0.98 (25)	21.70 (551)
Average precipitation days (≥ 0.01 in)	3.0	3.7	5.1	4.4	6.8	7.3	5.6	5.9	6.2	5.4	3.5	3.5	60.4
Source: NOAA

== Notable people ==
- Randy Crouch, Oklahoma Music Awards: 2004 Fiddler Of The Year, 2005 Red Dirt Hall of Fame, and 2006 Steel Guitarist Of The Year
- Don Maynard, NFL wide receiver, member of the Pro Football Hall of Fame

== See also ==
- White River (Texas)
