= Ralls Independent School District =

School district in Texas

Ralls Independent School District is a public school district based in Ralls, Texas (USA).

In 2009, the school district was rated "academically acceptable" by the Texas Education Agency.

== Schools ==
- Ralls High School (Grades 9-12)
- Ralls Middle School (Grades 6-8)
- Ralls Elementary School (Grades PK-5)
